= Justin Boren =

American football player (born 1988)

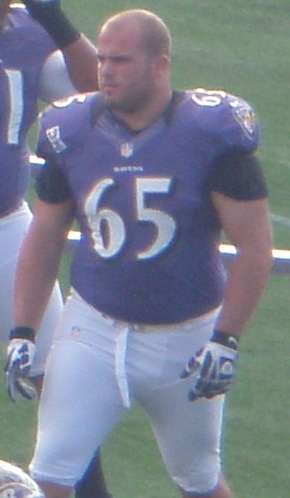
- Boren at Navy–Marine Corps Memorial Stadium in August 2012

No. 65
- Position: Guard

Personal information
- Born: April 28, 1988 (age 38); Pickerington, Ohio, U.S.
- Listed height: 6 ft 2 in (1.88 m)
- Listed weight: 315 lb (143 kg)

Career information
- High school: Pickerington North
- College: Michigan (2006—2007); Ohio State (2008—2010)
- NFL draft: 2011: undrafted

Career history
- Baltimore Ravens (2011−2012); Detroit Lions (2012)*; Denver Broncos (2013)
- * Offseason or practice squad member only

Awards and highlights
- Second-team All-American (2010); 2× First-team All-Big Ten (2009, 2010)
- Stats at Pro Football Reference

Justin Matthew Boren (born April 28, 1988) is an American former professional football player. Though a guard in the National Football League (NFL), Boren played both guard and center during his high school and college football career. In high school, he was widely regarded as one of the top offensive linemen in the country and one of the top football prospects in the state of Ohio. He was selected to play in the U.S. Army All-American Bowl and was a Parade All-American and an Associated Press All-Ohio selection. The son of 1982 and 1983 Michigan Wolverines tackles leader Mike Boren, Justin was widely recruited by the nation's top schools, including both his father's alma mater, the University of Michigan and its archrival, Ohio State University, Boren's hometown school.

After an intense recruitment, Boren choose to play at Michigan despite leaning towards attending Ohio State early in his recruitment. He played in several games as a true freshman, making one start. As a sophomore, he became a regular starter, earning 2007 All-Big Ten Conference honorable mention. When head coach Lloyd Carr retired and was replaced by Rich Rodriguez, Boren became unhappy with the new staff and transferred to Ohio State. After transferring he had to sit 2008 NCAA Division I FBS football season and was also required to pay his own tuition, per Big Ten conference rules. He earned recognition as a selection to the 2009 and 2010 All-Big Ten team by both the coaches (second-team) and the media (first-team). He was also a 2010 College Football All-America Team second-team selection by several selectors. In 2009, he became the third player (following Howard Yerges and J. T. White) to play for both sides of the Michigan – Ohio State rivalry. He was also teammates with his brother, Zach Boren, who was a starting fullback and linebacker for the Buckeyes. He was signed by the Baltimore Ravens of the NFL as an undrafted free agent in 2011. He was also a member of the Detroit Lions and Denver Broncos but never played in a regular season or postseason NFL game.

== Early life ==
Boren is Jewish, and was born in Pickerington, Ohio. He was a freshman starter at Pickerington High School Central before transferring to Pickerington High School North the following year. As a high school sophomore, Boren played guard and was an honors student. During his high school years, his father was his harshest critic. As a junior, he was listed as a nose guard on defense and an offensive tackle. That season, he earned Division I Associated Press All-Ohio High School Football Team special mention. By the time he was a junior, he was being recruited by both Ohio State, the local school, and Michigan, where his father played. As a senior who bench pressed 450 pounds (204 kg) and squatted 660 pounds (299 kg), he was regarded as Central Ohio's most sought after high school football recruit. As a result, he was selected to participate as one of 78 players in the 2006 U.S. Army All-American Bowl where he started at left offensive guard for the East team. He was also selected to the Associated Press first-team Division I All-Central District and All-Ohio high school football teams as an offensive lineman. After committing to Michigan, he enrolled in classes at the University of Michigan in January of what would have been the end of his senior year in high school along with roommate Carlos Brown. Of all the football prospects from the state of Ohio, Boren was the only one that Ohio State was not able to lure.

College recruiting
Name	Hometown	School	Height	Weight	40^{‡}	Commit date
Justin Boren; C	Pickerington, Ohio	Pickerington High School North (OH)	6 ft 3 in (1.91 m)	315 lb (143 kg)	5.24	May 13, 2005
Justin Boren; C	Recruit ratings: Scout: Rivals: 247Sports: (82)					
Overall recruit ranking: Scout: 7 (OL) Rivals: 64, 1 (C), 4 (OH) ESPN: 71
Note: In many cases, Scout, Rivals, 247Sports, On3, and ESPN may conflict in their listings of height and weight.; In these cases, the average was taken. ESPN grades are on a 100-point scale.; Sources: "Michigan Football Commitments". Rivals.; "2006 Michigan Football Commits". Scout.; "ESPN". ESPN.; "Scout.com Team Recruiting Rankings". Scout.; "2006 Team Ranking". Rivals.com.

== College career ==
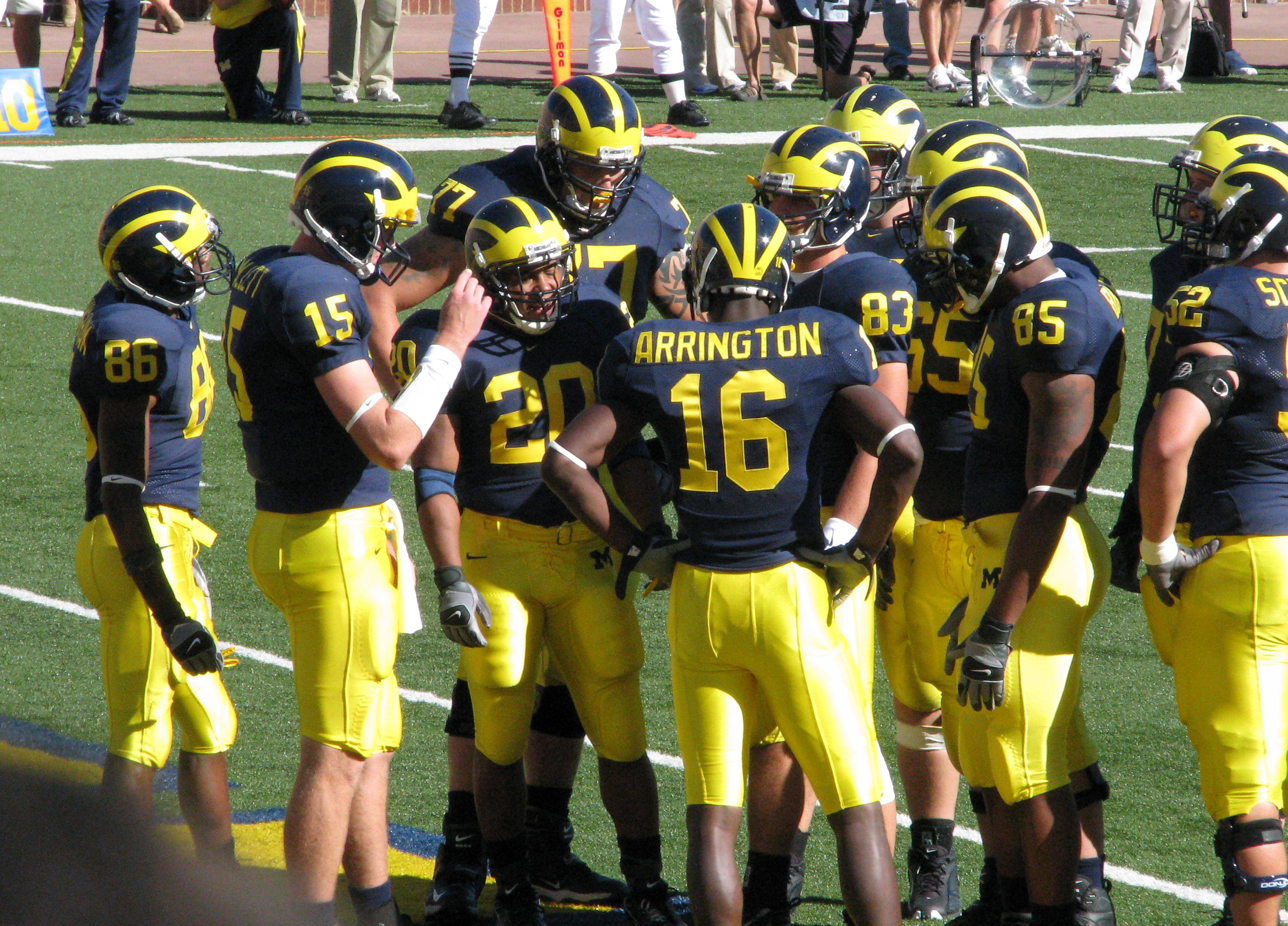
2007 Michigan Wolverines football team huddle with Mario Manningham (86), Ryan Mallett (15), Mike Hart (20), Jake Long (77, behind Hart), Adrian Arrington (16), Mike Massey (83), Boren (65), Carson Butler (85), and Stephen Schilling (partially in view on right) (52).

=== Michigan ===
Having enrolled in January 2006, Boren (and roommate Brown) were available to participate in 2006 Spring Football. Both players participated in spring practice, which was part of a national trend of more high schoolers enrolling early. Although early enrollment had been occurring for several years, Kevin Grady had been the first at Michigan in 2005.

As a freshman during the 2006 NCAA Division I FBS football season for the 2006 Michigan Wolverines, Boren was injured during training camp, and he did not dress in the season opener. He had suffered a broken leg. Despite being injured through the entire month of September, Boren decided not to redshirt and debuted during the Paul Bunyan Trophy rivalry game against Michigan State on October 7. Two weeks later, when Rueben Riley got injured against the Iowa Hawkeyes, he played the entire second half. On October 28, with Riley still injured, he became only the fourth true freshman to start on the Michigan offensive line in the modern era during a victory against Northwestern. The following week against Ball State, Boren saw action after Jake Long got kicked in the helmet. Boren's final action of the season came against the Indiana Hoosiers on November 11. During the 2006 season, all of his appearances were at guard. During 2007 Rose Bowl practices at the end of the 2006 season, Boren had practiced exclusively at center.

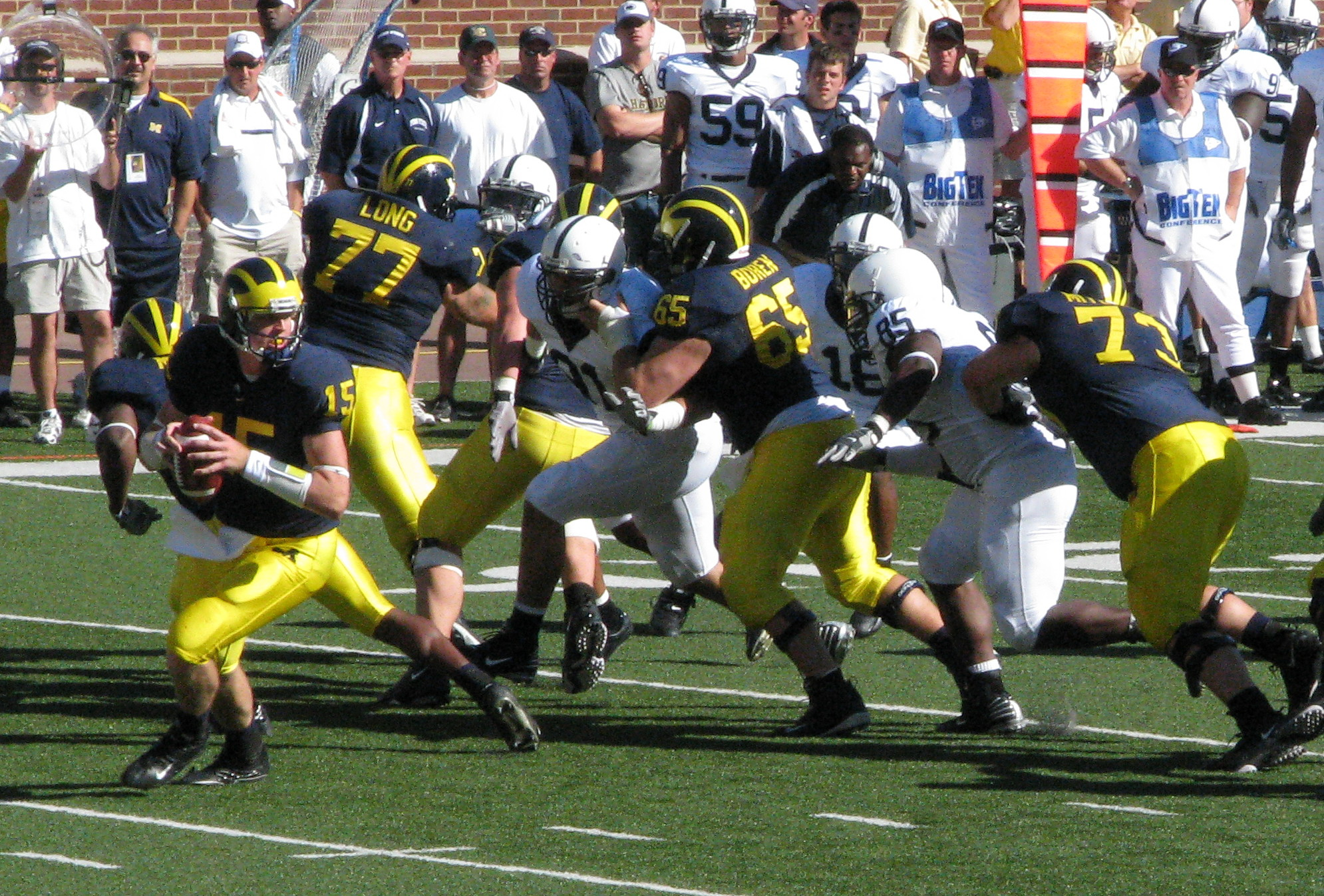
Ryan Mallett rolls out against Penn State. Jake Long and Boren are among the visible linemen against Penn State

Boren had been recruited as either a center or a guard, but he preferred to play guard. In spring practice the following year, Boren was moved to center. At the end of the National Collegiate Athletic Association-sanctioned 15 days of spring football practice, he was announced as the starting center, replacing Mark Bihl. This decision was confirmed when training camp started in the fall, even though Boren had never before played center. Thus, the starting offensive line was composed of veterans Long and Adam Kraus on the left and then Boren, right guard Jeremy Ciulla and right tackle Stephen Schilling neither of whom had ever started a game. The 2007 NCAA Division I FBS football season was eagerly anticipated for the 2007 Wolverines with returning seniors Long, Mike Hart and Chad Henne in key roles, but the season quickly began to fall apart when the team lost to the Appalachian State Mountaineers, the two-time defending FCS champion, in the opening game. When Ryan Mallett played in place of Henne during the September 15 rivalry game against Notre Dame, left-handed snapper Boren switched positions with right-handed snapper Kraus who otherwise played left guard. The switch occurred after Mallett fumbled two snaps from Boren, whose left-handed snaps were foreign to the right-handed Mallett. The switch caused a little confusion with official starting lineups the following week when Mallett started. On September 22 against Penn State, both Boren and Kraus had casts on their snapping hands and Boren played center despite the fact that Mallett was starting. During Mallett's October 27 start in the Little Brown Jug game against Minnesota, Kraus started at center. The following week during the Paul Bunyan Trophy against Michigan State, the position switch was made permanent. After the regular season, Boren was recognized as an honorable mention All-Big Ten selection. Prior to the 2008 Capital One Bowl, Boren was expected to return to center because Henne had returned to full strength. However, during the game, Boren played guard and Kraus played center. After the season, both Boren and Kraus were named to Jewish Sports Review's 2007 College Football All-America Team.

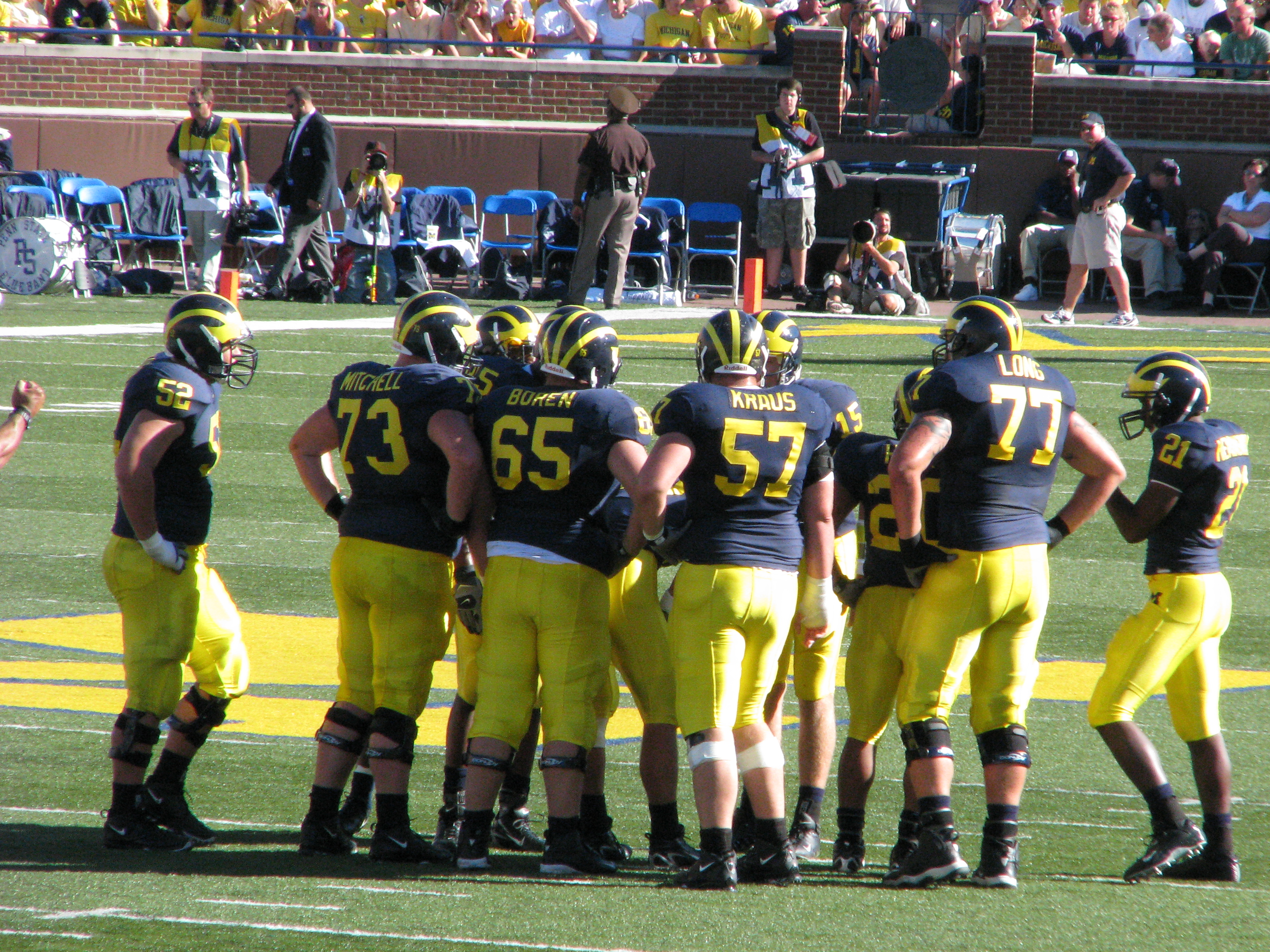
Adam Kraus (57) and Jake Long (77) obscure Ryan Mallett (15) and Mike Hart (20), while Boren (65) looks on.

After the season, head coach Lloyd Carr was replaced by Rich Rodriguez. Rodriguez' no huddle spread option offense, which used zone blocking, was a major adjustment for Boren. By the tenth day of spring practice Boren had left the team. Boren made a statement to the press regarding his decision, which included the following excerpt: "Michigan football was a family, built on mutual respect and support for each other from (former) Coach (Lloyd) Carr on down. We knew it took the entire family, a team effort, and we all worked together. . I have great trouble accepting that those family values have eroded in just a few months. . .That I am unable to perform under these circumstances at the level I expect of myself, and my teammates and Michigan fans deserve, is why I have made the decision to leave." A month later, Ohio State coach Jim Tressel announced Boren would redshirt for the 2008 NCAA Division I FBS football season and become the first player to transfer from Michigan to play for archrival Ohio State since at least World War II. According to Section 14.5.2.B of the Rules of Eligibility in the Big Ten handbook, Boren is ineligible to be a scholarship athlete after transferring. A little more than a week after Justin announced his transfer, his younger brother Zach committed to Ohio State. Later that summer, Detroit Free Press writer Michael Rosenberg, backed up Boren's statement about family values: "Rodriguez's staff uses some of the foulest, most degrading language imaginable. I know coaches curse, and I'm no prude, but this goes way beyond a few dirty words. He belittles his players. This is a big part of why offensive lineman Justin Boren left the team. He felt his dignity was at stake."

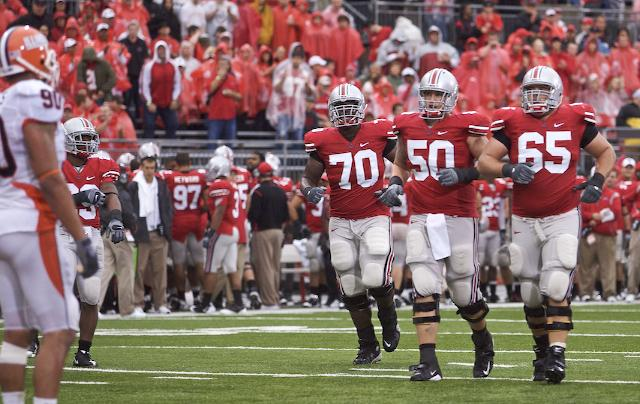
Bryant Browning, Mike Brewster and Boren come to the line of scrimmage after a time out.

=== Ohio State ===
When Boren arrived at Ohio State at 6 feet 3 inches (1.91 m) and 310 pounds (140 kg), he was one of the smallest offensive linemen on the team. During his redshirt season, he wore the number 56. In order to bond with his new teammates such as Alex Boone, he shaved lightning bolts into his head. While redshirtting, he stood out in practice where he performed on the scout team. In fact, during the week leading up to the final regular season game against Michigan, he wore the Winged Football Helmet that Michigan is known for as part of the scout team. The 2008 Ohio State Buckeyes football team included three seniors on the offensive line: Boone, Steve Rehring and Ben Person.

Terrelle Pryor passes behind Justin Boren
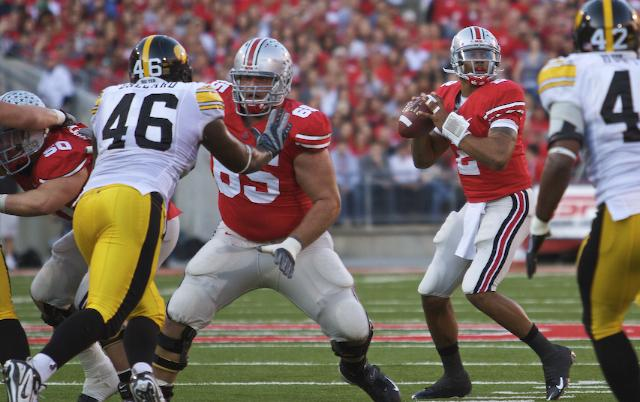
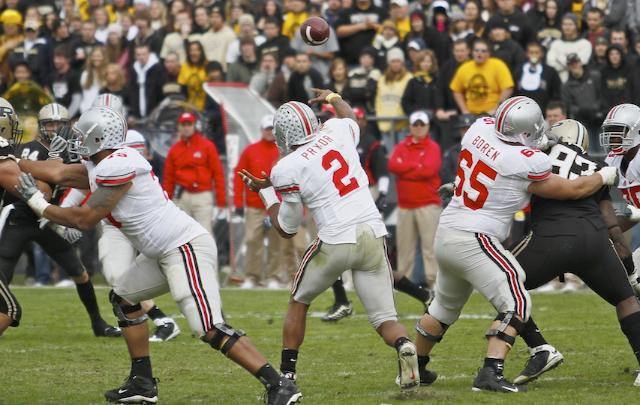

A total of 28 seniors graduated from the football team leaving the 2009 Ohio State Buckeyes football team with five returning starters on offense for the 2009 NCAA Division I FBS football season. However, the team had the number one recruiting class in the nation according to the Chicago Sun-Times. Both Scout.com and Rivals.com agreed with this number one ranking prior to the final signing period and although the offensive line had been the team's problem in 2008, the highly touted class included three tackles and a guard plus transfer Boren.

In the spring of 2009, Hope Boren spoke at signing day about her two sons prospects for at Ohio State: "As a parent, you always try to raise kids who are happy and successful . . . And I know my kids are happy and I think they'll be successful." Zach Boren said, "Everyone in the whole family is an Ohio State fan now. . .No one cares about Michigan at all anymore. That was in the past and we're all looking forward to being Buckeyes and staying Buckeyes for the rest of our lives." During spring practice, Boren impressed his coaches and teammates; however, he refused all interview requests. During the summer, when asked about the impending Michigan – Ohio State game he said "My attitude is there are 11 games before that game,. . .I can't let myself get worked up thinking about that game. I don't want to take a chance of being unprepared for any of the first 11 games. The week that game gets here, it will be my primary focus." By then, he was projected to be the starting left guard, and he was expected to be an important part of the team.

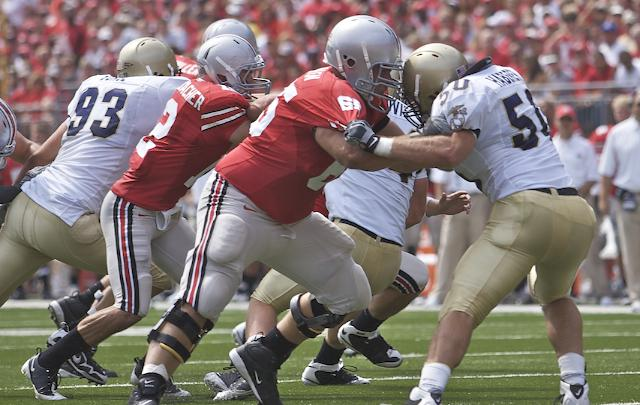
Boren blocking for Dane Sanzenbacher

Prior to the 2009 season, Boren suffered a knee injury. The injury was not severe because of the knee brace that he was wearing. He recovered in time to be in the starting lineup at left guard along with his younger brother who started at fullback for the September 5 season opener against Navy. The media portrayed Boren as a nasty and intense player, which Boren downplayed. Early in the season, the offensive line struggled. But as the season progressed guards Boren and Bryant Browning teamed up with second-year linemen Michael Brewster, J.B. Shugarts and Mike Adams to form a unit that worked effectively. Boren missed the October 31 non-conference game against New Mexico State due to an unspecified foot injury. When he returned to Michigan Stadium for the season finale, Michigan defensive end Brandon Graham was very vocal about Boren's departure. At the conclusion of the 2009 Big Ten season, he was named to the All-Big Ten Conference team by both the coaches (second-team) and the media (first-team). The following 2010 season, he repeated as a first-team media and second-team coaches All-Big Ten Conference selection. He was named as a second-team All-American selection by Associated Press, CBS Sports, Rivals.com and Scout.com.

== Professional career ==
Pre-draft measurables
Height	Weight	Arm length	Hand span	Wingspan	40-yard dash	10-yard split	20-yard split	20-yard shuttle	Three-cone drill	Vertical jump	Broad jump	Bench press
6 ft 2 7/8 in (1.90 m)	309 lb (140 kg)	32 in (0.81 m)	9 1/2 in (0.24 m)	6 ft 4 5/8 in (1.95 m)	5.26 s	1.76 s	3.01 s	4.75 s	7.57 s	32.0 in (0.81 m)	8 ft 0 in (2.44 m)	28 reps
All values from NFL Combine/Pro Day

Boren was one of 56 offensive linemen invited to participate in the February 24 – March 1, 2011 NFL Scouting Combine. He ranked thirteenth in the bench press with a total of 28 repetitions. He ranked eleventh in the three cone drill with a time of 7.57. Following the draft and the 2011 NFL lockout, Boren was regarded as one of the best available free agents.

=== Baltimore Ravens ===
Boren was signed by the Baltimore Ravens on July 26, 2011. Boren's former University of Michigan offensive line coach Andy Moeller was a coach with Baltimore at the time of his signing. He was waived by the team on September 3, 2011, but he was signed to the practice squad on September 5. On January 3, 2012, during the first round bye week of the 2011–12 NFL playoffs, Boren was activated. On September 1, 2012, Boren was assigned to injured reserve. Boren reached an injury settlement with the team before being removed from the roster later that week.

=== Detroit Lions ===
Boren was named to the practice squad of the Detroit Lions on November 20, 2012.

=== Denver Broncos ===
On January 7, 2013, the Denver Broncos signed Boren to a futures contract. On August 7, 2013, Boren was waived/injured by the Broncos. On August 8, 2013, he cleared waivers and was placed on the Broncos' injured reserve list.

== Personal life ==
Boren's father, Mike Boren, played football for Michigan from 1980 to 1983 and his mother, Hope, ran track there from 1979 to 1982. Boren attended the 2005 Michigan Summer Football Camp. Mike led the Wolverines in tackles in 1982 and 1983. Justin's youngest brother, Jacoby, was a sophomore at Pickerington Central High School in 2009. By December 2010, Jacoby had committed to Ohio State.

== See also ==
- List of select Jewish football players
