= 2007 Michigan Wolverines football team =

American college football season

2007 Michigan Wolverines football

Capital One Bowl champion

Capital One Bowl, W 41–35 vs. Florida
- Conference: Big Ten Conference

Ranking
- Coaches: No. 19
- AP: No. 18
- Record: 9–4 (6–2 Big Ten)
- Head coach: Lloyd Carr (13th season)
- Offensive coordinator: Mike DeBord (5th season)
- Offensive scheme: Multiple
- Defensive coordinator: Ron English (2nd season)
- Base defense: Multiple
- MVP: Mike Hart
- Captains: Shawn Crable; Mike Hart; Jake Long
- Home stadium: Michigan Stadium

2007 Big Ten Conference football standings
	Conf.			Overall
Team	W		L	W		L
No. 5 Ohio State $	7	–	1	11	–	2
No. 18 Michigan	6	–	2	9	–	4
No. 20 Illinois %	6	–	2	9	–	4
No. 24 Wisconsin	5	–	3	9	–	4
Penn State	4	–	4	9	–	4
Iowa	4	–	4	6	–	6
Purdue	3	–	5	8	–	5
Indiana	3	–	5	7	–	6
Michigan State	3	–	5	7	–	6
Northwestern	3	–	5	6	–	6
Minnesota	0	–	8	1	–	11
$ – BCS representative as conference champion; % – BCS at-large representative; Rankings from AP Poll

The 2007 Michigan Wolverines football team was an American football team that represented the University of Michigan as a member of the Big Ten Conference during the 2007 NCAA Division I FBS football season. In their 13th and final season under head coach Lloyd Carr, the Wolverines compiled a 9–4 record (6–2 in conference games), finished in a tie for second place in the Big Ten, and outscored opponents by a total of 354 to 278. They began the season with a stunning upset loss to Appalachian State from the FCS, won eight straight games in the middle of the season, and ended with a victory over No. 9 Florida in the Capital One Bowl.

The team's statistical leaders included quarterback Chad Henne with 1,938 passing yards, running back Mike Hart with 1,361 rushing yards and 84 points scored, and wide receiver Mario Manningham with 1,174 receiving yards. Hart also won the team's most valuable player award. Offensive tackle Jake Long was a consensus All-American. Four Michigan players received first-team honors on the 2007 All-Big Ten Conference football team: Jake Long (Coaches-1, Media-1); Chad Henne (Coaches-1); Mario Manningham (Coaches-1, Media-1); and guard Adam Kraus (Coaches-1, Media-1).

== Schedule ==
The 2007 Wolverine schedule was ranked the 15th toughest in the country. The home schedule was ranked as the 5th toughest.

Date	Time	Opponent	Rank	Site	TV	Result	Attendance	Source
September 1	12:00 p.m.	No. 1 (FCS) Appalachian State*	No. 5	Michigan Stadium; Ann Arbor, MI	BTN	L 32–34	109,218	
September 8	3:30 p.m.	Oregon*		Michigan Stadium; Ann Arbor, MI	ABC	L 7–39	109,733	
September 15	3:30 p.m.	Notre Dame*		Michigan Stadium; Ann Arbor, MI (rivalry)	ABC	W 38–0	111,178	
September 22	3:30 p.m.	No. 10 Penn State		Michigan Stadium; Ann Arbor, MI (rivalry)	ABC/ESPN	W 14–9	111,310	
September 29	12:00 p.m.	at Northwestern		Ryan Field; Evanston, IL (rivalry)	BTN	W 28–16	40,604	
October 6	12:00 p.m.	Eastern Michigan*		Michigan Stadium; Ann Arbor, MI	BTN	W 33–22	108,415	
October 13	12:00 p.m.	Purdue^{†}		Michigan Stadium; Ann Arbor, MI	BTN	W 48–21	110,888	
October 20	8:00 p.m.	at Illinois	No. 24	Memorial Stadium; Champaign, IL (rivalry)	ABC	W 27–17	57,078	
October 27	3:30 p.m.	Minnesota	No. 19	Michigan Stadium; Ann Arbor, MI (Little Brown Jug)	ESPNC/ABC	W 34–10	109,432	
November 3	3:30 p.m.	at Michigan State	No. 15	Spartan Stadium; East Lansing, MI (rivalry)	ABC/ESPN	W 28–24	77,009	
November 10	12:00 p.m.	at Wisconsin	No. 13	Camp Randall Stadium; Madison, WI	ESPN	L 21–37	82,352	
November 17	12:00 p.m.	No. 7 Ohio State	No. 23	Michigan Stadium; Ann Arbor, MI (The Game, College GameDay)	ABC	L 3–14	111,941	
January 1, 2008	1:00 p.m.	vs. No. 9 Florida*		Florida Citrus Bowl; Orlando, FL (Capital One Bowl)	ABC	W 41–35	69,748	
*Non-conference game; ^{†}Homecoming; Rankings from AP Poll released prior to the game; All times are in Eastern time

Radio coverage for all games was on the Michigan Sports Network, as well as on Sirius Satellite Radio.

== Preseason ==
After finishing the 2006 season with a record of 11–2, and contending for the national championship game, many were expecting the Wolverines to build on their success, earning a national preseason ranking of No. 5.

On March 25, Coach Lloyd Carr announced that TE Carson Butler, DE Eugene Germany, and DB Chris Richards had been dismissed for violations of team policy.

Carr also had stated that WR Adrian Arrington had been suspended for the spring practice session due to a violation of team policy. Carr was uncertain about Arrington's future at Michigan but Arrington did play WR at Michigan for the 2007 season.

Backup QB Jason Forcier asked to be released from his scholarship to transfer to Stanford University, and LB Cobrani Mixon was released from his scholarship to transfer to Kent State University.

== Game summaries ==
=== Appalachian State ===
Appalachian State at Michigan

Team	1	2	3	4	Total
• Appalachian State	7	21	3	3	34
#5 Michigan	14	3	9	6	32

- Date: September 1
- Location: Michigan Stadium
  Ann Arbor, MI
- Game start: 12:00 pm EST
- Elapsed time: 3:37
- Game attendance: 109,218
- Game weather: 75 °F (24 °C), Sunny, N 12 MPH
- Referee: John O'Neill
- TV announcers (BTN): Thom Brennaman (Play-by-play), Charles Davis (Color) & Charissa Thompson (Sideline)

In the 34–32 loss, Michigan became the second team ever ranked in the AP Top 25 to lose to a Division I FCS team. Michigan started out strong, finishing the first quarter 14–7, but the Mountaineers scored 21 unanswered points to go up 28–14 just before halftime. After trailing 28–14 in the first half, Michigan recaptured a 32–31 lead thanks to three Appalachian State turnovers and a 54-yard touchdown run by senior running back Mike Hart with 4:36 left in the game.

However, after the teams traded possessions, the Mountaineers drove 69 yards in 11 plays, and Julian Rauch connected on a 24-yard field goal with 26 seconds remaining in the contest to give ASU a 34–32 lead. After a failed pass attempt, Chad Henne connected with Mario Manningham on a Hail Mary Pass with under 15 seconds left to get Michigan to the 20-yard line. Michigan had a 37-yard field goal to give Michigan what looked like to be their escape from the upset. Then, shocking the College Football world, Appalachian State's Corey Lynch blocked the kick with 6 seconds left to seal the huge upset. The attendance for the game was 109,218. Following the game, Michigan dropped out of the Top 25 in the next poll. This was first time in the history of the AP Poll that a team ranked in the Top 5 had fallen out of the poll as a result of a single game.

Scoring summary

Quarter	Time	Drive			Team	Scoring information	Score	
Quarter	Time	Plays	Yards	TOP	Team	Scoring information	Appalachian State	Michigan
1	12:31	6	66	2:29	Michigan	Mike Hart 4-yard touchdown run, Jason Gingell kick good	0	7
1	10:55	3	74	1:36	Appalachian State	Dexter Jackson 68-yard touchdown reception from Armanti Edwards, Julian Rauch kick good	7	7
1	3:16	10	52	3:38	Michigan	Greg Mathews 10-yard touchdown reception from Chad Henne, Jason Gingell kick good	7	14
2	13:35	11	65	4:41	Appalachian State	Hans Batichon 9-yard touchdown reception from Armanti Edwards, Julian Rauch kick good	14	14
2	9:47	5	37	2:15	Appalachian State	Dexter Jackson 20-yard touchdown reception from Armanti Edwards, Julian Rauch kick good	21	14
2	2:15	9	65	4:38	Appalachian State	Armanti Edwards 6-yard touchdown run, Julian Rauch kick good	28	14
2	0:16	10	63	1:59	Michigan	22-yard field goal by Jason Gingell	28	17
3	12:57	5	14	1:13	Michigan	42-yard field goal by Jason Gingell	28	20
3	8:17	11	64	4:40	Appalachian State	31-yard field goal by Julian Rauch	31	20
3	0:24	6	31	2:04	Michigan	Mike Hart 4-yard touchdown run, 2-point run failed	31	26
4	4:36	1	54	0:15	Michigan	Mike Hart 54-yard touchdown run, 2-point run failed	31	32
4	0:26	7	69	1:11	Appalachian State	24-yard field goal by Julian Rauch	34	32
"TOP" = time of possession. For other American football terms, see Glossary of American football.							34	32

=== Oregon ===
Oregon at Michigan

Team	1	2	3	4	Total
• Oregon	11	21	7	0	39
Michigan	7	0	0	0	7

- Date: September 8
- Location: Michigan Stadium
  Ann Arbor, MI
- Game start: 3:30 pm EST
- Elapsed time: 3:37
- Game attendance: 109,733
- Game weather: 75 °F (24 °C), Partly Cloudy, E 7 MPH
- Referee: Bill LeMonnier
- TV announcers (ABC): Brad Nessler (Play-by-play), Bob Griese (Color), Paul Maguire (Color) & Bonnie Bernstein (Sideline)

Scoring summary
1	9:46	ORE	Matt Evensen 23-yard field goal	ORE 3-0
1	5:29	MICH	Adrian Arrington 7-yard pass from Chad Henne (Jason Gingell kick)	MICH 7-3
1	4:40	ORE	Brian Paysinger 85-yard pass from Dennis Dixon (Ed Dickson run)	ORE 11-7
2	10:33	ORE	Jonathan Stewart 2-yard run (Daniel Padilla kick)	ORE 18-7
2	3:41	ORE	Dennis Dixon 9-yard run (Matt Evenson kick)	ORE 25-7
2	3:03	ORE	Dennis Jones 61-yard pass from Dennis Dixon (Daniel Padilla kick)	ORE 32-7
3	2:39	ORE	Jaison Williams 46-yard pass from Dennis Dixon (Matt Evenson kick)	ORE 39-7

Michigan looked to recover from their stunning loss to App State in their next game against Oregon. Michigan took a 7–3 lead in the first quarter, but then Dennis Dixon and the high-powered Oregon offense went to town on the struggling Wolverines defense, giving Michigan one of its worst home losses on record. The Michigan fans booed the Wolverines on their home field and people were calling for Head Coach Lloyd Carr to be fired. The loss was another embarrassment to the football program at the University of Michigan. In addition to the huge defeat, Michigan lost its senior QB Chad Henne to a knee injury for two games due to a play in the second quarter. ESPN reported, "A week after getting stunned by Appalachian State, the Wolverines were handed their worst beating since before Bo Schembechler worked the sideline at the Big House. Dennis Dixon accounted for 368 yards and a career-high four touchdowns, helping the Ducks build a 25-point lead at halftime and cruise to an easy victory." The 32-point defeat was Michigan's worst loss since losing 50–14 at Ohio State in 1968 and their second-worst home loss ever, dating back to a 40-0 loss to Minnesota in 1935. The Wolverines started 0–2 for the first time since 1998 and the first time starting 0–2 on a homestead since 1959 but in a positive note, both those times Michigan rebounded back and won the Big Ten title.

=== Notre Dame ===
Notre Dame at Michigan

Team	1	2	3	4	Total
Notre Dame	0	0	0	0	0
• Michigan	10	21	7	0	38

- Date: September 15
- Location: Michigan Stadium
  Ann Arbor, MI
- Game start: 3:30 pm EST
- Elapsed time: 3:02
- Game attendance: 111,178
- Game weather: 55 °F (13 °C), Partly Cloudy, WNW 10 MPH
- Referee: Dan Capron
- TV announcers (ABC): Brad Nessler (Play-by-play), Bob Griese (Color), Paul Maguire & Bonnie Bernstein (Sideline)

Scoring summary
1	10:53	MICH	Jason Gingell 39-yard field goal	MICH 3-0
1	7:34	MICH	Mike Hart 2-yard run (Jason Gingell kick)	MICH 10-0
2	14:39	MICH	Mike Hart 3-yard run (Jason Gingell kick)	MICH 17-0
2	11:34	MICH	Greg Mathews 26-yard pass from Ryan Mallett (Jason Gingell kick)	MICH 24-0
2	0:25	MICH	Adrian Arrington 5-yard pass from Ryan Mallett (Jason Gingell kick)	MICH 31-0
3	4:10	MICH	Mario Manningham 13-yard pass from Ryan Mallett (Jason Gingell kick)	MICH 38-0

The Wolverines and The Fighting Irish met for the first time with both teams boasting an 0–2 record. Since both teams lost their final two games of the 2006 season, the loser of this game would have a five-game losing streak. Lloyd Carr faced many challenges, including the loss of his senior quarterback Chad Henne to a leg injury, fans calling for his firing, and his senior running back Mike Hart guaranteed a victory over the Irish.

Michigan won 38–0, tying their largest-ever win over Notre Dame set during the 2003 season. For only the second time in school history, Notre Dame opened the season with three losses.

=== Penn State ===
Penn State at Michigan

Team	1	2	3	4	Total
#10 Penn State	0	3	3	3	9
• Michigan	7	0	0	7	14

- Date: September 22
- Location: Michigan Stadium
  Ann Arbor, MI
- Game start: 3:30 pm EST
- Elapsed time: 3:12
- Game attendance: 111,310
- Game weather: 77 °F (25 °C), Partly Cloudy, NW 20 MPH
- Referee: Dennis Lipski
- TV announcers (ABC/ESPN): Brad Nessler (Play-by-play), Bob Griese (Color), Paul Maguire (Color) & Bonnie Bernstein (Sideline)

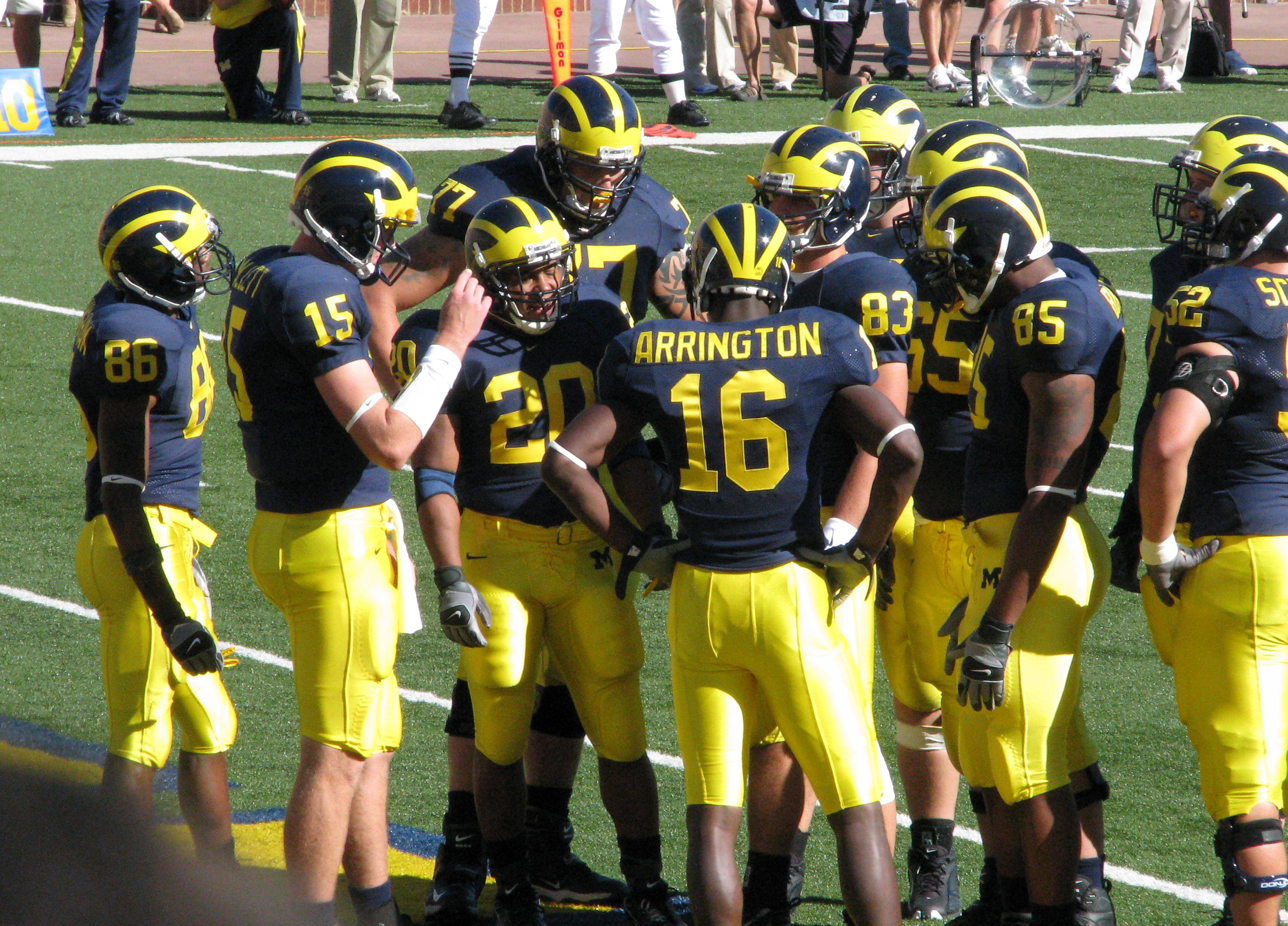
2007 Michigan Wolverines football team huddle with Mario Manningham (86), Ryan Mallett (15), Mike Hart (20), Jake Long (77), Adrian Arrington (16), Mike Massey (83), Justin Boren (65), Carson Butler (85), and Stephen Schilling (52) against Penn State

In the 2007 Big Ten season opener, the unranked Michigan Wolverines defeated No. 10 Penn State 14–9. Sr. running back Mike Hart had 44 carries 153 yards and a TD. In his second start freshmen QB Ryan Mallett was 16–29 passes and a rushing TD.

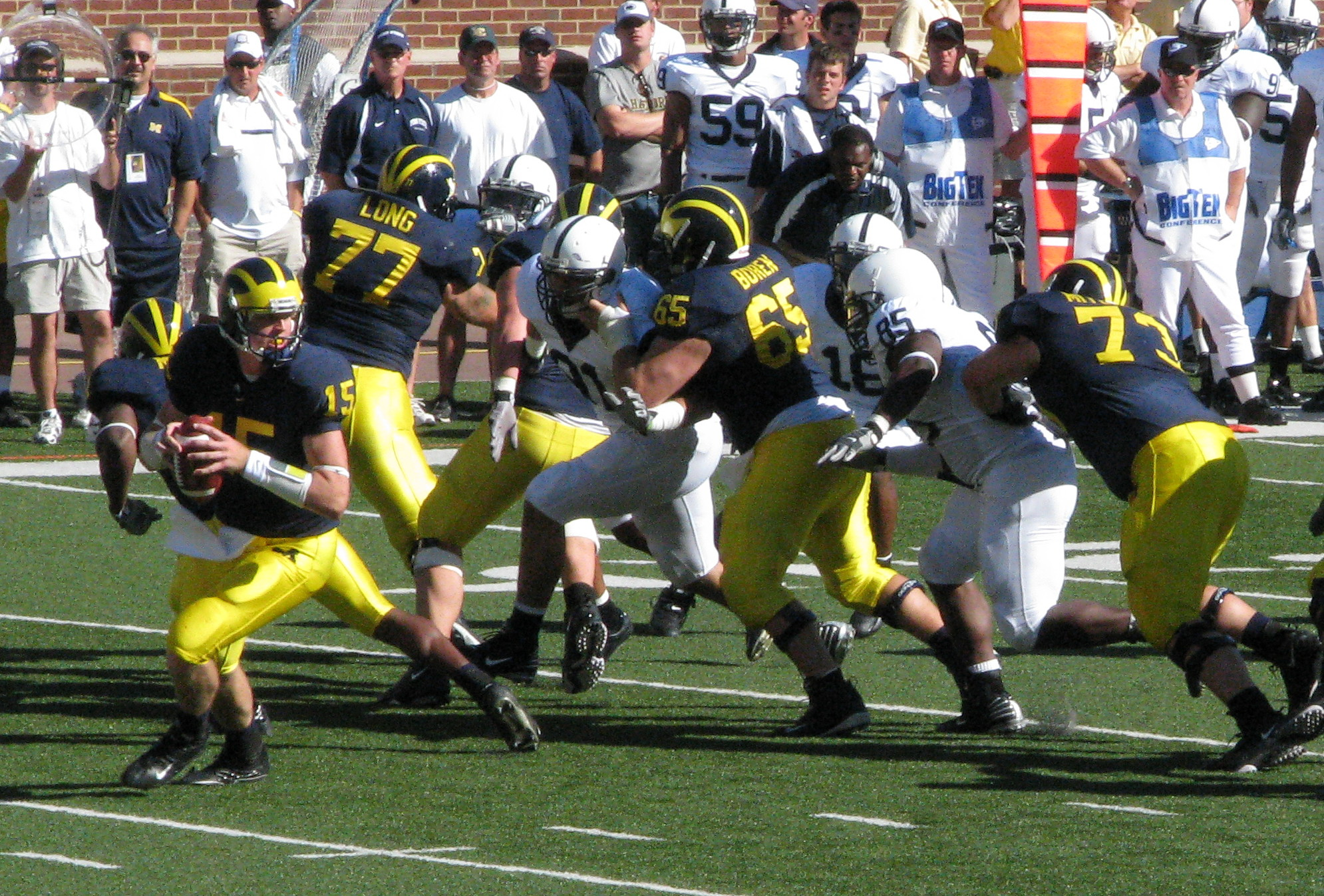
Mallett rolling out

=== Northwestern ===
Michigan at Northwestern

Team	1	2	3	4	Total
• Michigan	7	0	7	14	28
Northwestern	10	6	0	0	16

- Date: September 29
- Location: Ryan Field
  Evanston, IL
- Game start: 12:00 pm EDT
- Elapsed time: 3:25
- Game attendance: 46,604
- Game weather: 73 °F (23 °C), Cloudy, SSE 11 MPH
- Referee: Steve Pamon
- TV announcers (BTN): Wayne Larrivee (Play-by-play), Chris Martin (Color) & Dara McIntosh (Sideline)

The Michigan football team went on the first road game of the season defeating the Wildcats 28–16. Henne returned to the lineup to complete 18–27 passes and three touchdowns. Mike Hart had 106 yards and a TD. The Wolverines forced a turnover on the last 4 of the Wildcat possessions.

=== Eastern Michigan ===
Eastern Michigan at Michigan

Team	1	2	3	4	Total
Eastern Michigan	3	5	6	8	22
• Michigan	10	6	17	0	33

- Date: October 6
- Location: Michigan Stadium
  Ann Arbor, MI
- Game start: 12:00 pm EST
- Elapsed time: 3:13
- Game attendance: 108,415
- Game weather: 85 °F (29 °C), Mostly Sunny, SW 12 MPH
- Referee: Dave Witvoet
- TV announcers (BTN): Mark Neely (Play-by-play), Glen Mason (Color) & Lisa Byington (Sideline)

=== Purdue ===
Purdue at Michigan

Team	1	2	3	4	Total
Purdue	7	0	0	14	21
• Michigan	17	14	3	14	48

- Date: October 13
- Location: Michigan Stadium
  Ann Arbor, MI
- Game start: 12:00 pm EST
- Elapsed time: 3:23
- Game attendance: 110,888
- Game weather: 52 °F (11 °C), Mostly Cloudy, W 7 MPH
- Referee: Todd Geerlings
- TV announcers (BTN): Thom Brennaman (Play-by-play), Charles Davis (Color) & Charissa Thompson (Sideline)

=== Illinois ===
Michigan at Illinois

Team	1	2	3	4	Total
• #24 Michigan	3	14	0	10	27
Illinois	7	7	3	0	17

- Date: October 20
- Location: Memorial Stadium
  Champaign, IL
- Game start: 8:00 pm EST
- Elapsed time: 3:18
- Game attendance: 57,078
- Game weather: 67 °F (19 °C), Clear, S 13 MPH
- Referee: Dan Capron
- TV announcers (ABC): Brent Musburger (Play-by-play), Kirk Herbstreit (Color) & Lisa Salters (Sideline)

=== Minnesota ===
Minnesota at Michigan

Team	1	2	3	4	Total
Minnesota	3	7	0	0	10
• #19 Michigan	0	13	7	14	34

- Date: October 27
- Location: Michigan Stadium
  Ann Arbor, MI
- Game start: 3:30 pm EST
- Elapsed time: 3:00
- Game attendance: 109,432
- Game weather: 55 °F (13 °C), Light Rain, SW 20 MPH
- Referee: Steve Pamon
- TV announcers (ESPNC/ABC): Clay Matvick (Play-by-play) & Bill Curry (Color)

Despite a slow start and two early turnovers, the Wolverines extended their win streak to seven without Chad Henne or Mike Hart. After a Minnesota field goal, Minnesota's Dominique Barber recovered one of Ryan Mallett's three fumbles and returned it for a touchdown. Despite that, the Wolverines held the Gophers to just 231 yards and 3 offensive points all game. Michigan's Brandon Minor and Carlos Brown both ran for over 100 yards, meaning up until this game Michigan has had a back go over 100 yards in every match up. Mario Manningham had his fourth straight 100+ yard game.

=== Michigan State ===
Michigan at Michigan State

Team	1	2	3	4	Total
• #15 Michigan	7	7	0	14	28
Michigan State	3	0	7	14	24

- Date: November 3
- Location: Spartan Stadium
  East Lansing, MI
- Game start: 3:30 pm EST
- Elapsed time: 3:36
- Game attendance: 77,009
- Game weather: 54 °F (12 °C), Partly Cloudy, WNW 14 MPH
- Referee: Bill LeMonnier
- TV announcers (ABC/ESPN): Brad Nessler (Play-by-play), Bob Griese (Color), Paul Maguire (Color) & Bonnie Bernstein (Sideline)

Scoring summary
1	11:28	MSU	Brett Swenson 36-yard field goal	MSU 3-0
1	3:54	MICH	Mario Manningham 11-yard pass from Chad Henne (K.C. Lopata kick)	MICH 7-3
2	12:46	MICH	Carson Butler 5-yard pass from Chad Henne (K.C. Lopata kick)	MICH 14-3
3	6:32	MSU	Jehuu Caulcrick 1-yard run (Brett Swenson kick)	MICH 14-10
4	14:55	MSU	Kellen Davis 5-yard pass from Brian Hoyer (Brett Swenson kick)	MSU 17-14
4	7:40	MSU	Jehuu Caulcrick 1-yard run (Brett Swenson kick)	MSU 24-14
4	6:47	MICH	Greg Mathews 14-yard pass from Chad Henne (K.C. Lopata kick)	MSU 24-21
4	2:28	MICH	Mario Manningham 31-yard pass from Chad Henne (K.C. Lopata kick)	MICH 28-24

On November 3, 2007, Michigan defeated Michigan State, 28-24, at Spartan Stadium in East Lansing, Michigan. It was the 100th game in the Michigan–Michigan State football rivalry and Michigan's sixth consecutive victory over Michigan State. Mark Dantonio's was in his first year as Michigan State's head coach.

On the opening drive of the game, the Spartans scored on a 36-yard field goal by Brett Swenson. Michigan took the lead with a 62-yard drive, including a 37-yard run by Mike Hart and concluding with an 11-yard touchdown pass from Chad Henne to Mario Manningham with 3:54 remaining in the first quarter. After Michigan safety Jamar Adams intercepted a Brian Hoyer pass, the Wolverines extended their lead with a 42-yard drive, including a 32-yard run by Hart and a five-yard touchdown pass from Henne to Carson Butler with 12:46 remaining in the half. Michigan led, 14-3, at halftime.

In the second half, the Spartans scored 21 unanswered points to take a 24-14 lead. The Spartan touchdowns were as follows:

- One-yard touchdown run by Jehuu Caulcrick with 6:32 remaining in the third quarter
- Five-yard touchdown pass from Hoyer to Kellen Davis (following a 72-yard run by Javon Ringer) with 14:55 remaining in the fourth quarter
- One-yard touchdown run by Caulcrick with 7:48 remaining

Michigan scored two touchdowns in the final seven minutes. The comeback began when freshman quarterback Ryan Mallett (entering the game after an injury knocked Henne from the game for one play) fumbled, and Hart picked up the ball and ran for a first down. Michigan drove 79 yards in 48 seconds, aided by a personal foul penalty against Kendell Davis-Clark, and ending with a 14-yard pass from Henne to Greg Matthews with 6:47 remaining. The defense then held the Spartans to a three-and-out, and the Wolverines drove 65 yards, including a third-and-eleven completion to Adrian Arrington, and ending with a third-and-twelve, 31-yard touchdown pass from Henne to Manningham at the 2:28 mark. Michigan State drove to Michigan's 33-yard line in the final two minutes, but Hoyer's pass on fourth-and-18 fell incomplete. Henne took a knee to run out the clock and seal the victory.

Henne tallied 211 passing yards with four touchdown passes. Hart rushed for 110 yards, and Manningham had 129 receiving yards.

=== Wisconsin ===
Michigan at Wisconsin

Team	1	2	3	4	Total
#13 Michigan	7	0	0	14	21
• Wisconsin	10	7	6	14	37

- Date: November 10
- Location: Camp Randall Stadium
  Madison, WI
- Game start: 12:00 pm EST
- Elapsed time: 3:30
- Game attendance: 82,352
- Game weather: 39 °F (4 °C), Partly Cloudy, S 9 MPH
- Referee: Dennis Lipski
- TV announcers (ESPN): Dave Pasch (Play-by-play), Andre Ware (Color) & Erin Andrews (Sideline)

Trailing 23-7, Ryan Mallett connected with Mario Manningham for a 97-yard touchdown.

=== Ohio State ===
Ohio State at Michigan

Team	1	2	3	4	Total
• #7 Ohio State	0	7	7	0	14
#23 Michigan	3	0	0	0	3

- Date: November 17
- Location: Michigan Stadium
  Ann Arbor, MI
- Game start: 12:00 pm EST
- Elapsed time: 3:10
- Game attendance: 111,941
- Game weather: 42 °F (6 °C), Chance Rain/Snow, W 7 MPH
- Referee: John O'Neill
- TV announcers (ABC): Brent Musburger (Play-by-play), Kirk Herbstreit (Color) & Lisa Salters (Sideline)

On November 17, 2007, Michigan lost to Ohio State, 14-3, before a crowd of 111, 941 at Michigan Stadium. Michigan took a 3-0 lead in the first quarter on a 33-yard field goal by K.C. Lopata. Ohio State scored on a one-yard touchdown run by Chris Wells in the second quarter and extended its lead in the third quarter on a 62-yard touchdown run by Wells. Wells totaled 222 rushing yards in the game. Michigan was held to 91 yards of total offense. It was Michigan's fourth consecutive loss to the Buckeyes.

=== Florida ===
Michigan vs. Florida

Team	1	2	3	4	Total
• Michigan	7	14	7	13	41
#9 Florida	7	7	14	7	35

- Date: January 1
- Location: Citrus Bowl
  Orlando, FL
- Game start: 1:00 pm EST
- Elapsed time: 3:52
- Game attendance: 69,748
- Game weather: 71 °F (22 °C), Partly Cloudy, N/NW 10 MPH
- Referee: Jeff Flanagan
- TV announcers (ABC): Mike Patrick (Play-by-play), Todd Blackledge (Color) & Holly Rowe (Sideline)

Scoring summary
1	10:59	MICH	Mario Manningham 21-yard pass from Chad Henne (K.C. Lopata kick)	MICH 7-0
1	2:37	FLA	Percy Harvin 10-yard pass from Tim Tebow (Joey Ijjas kick)	Tied 7-7
2	14:48	FLA	Andre Caldwell 18-yard pass from Tim Tebow (Joey Ijjas kick)	FLA 14-7
2	9:51	MICH	Mike Hart 3-yard run (K.C. Lopata kick)	Tied 14-14
2	0:08	MICH	Adrian Arrington 1-yard pass from Chad Henne (K.C. Lopata kick)	MICH 21-14
3	12:50	MICH	Mike Hart 1-yard run (K.C. Lopata kick)	MICH 28-14
3	7:55	FLA	Tim Tebow 1-yard run (Joey Ijjas kick)	MICH 28-21
3	1:26	FLA	Andre Caldwell 14-yard pass from Tim Tebow (Joey Ijjas kick)	Tied 28-28
4	12:16	MICH	K.C. Lopata 37-yard field goal	MICH 31-28
4	5:49	FLA	Percy Harvin 10-yard run (Joey Ijjas kick)	FLA 35-31
4	4:12	MICH	Adrian Arrington 18-yard pass from Chad Henne (K.C. Lopata kick)	MICH 38-35
4	2:21	MICH	K.C. Lopata 41-yard field goal	MICH 41-35

On January 1, 2008, unranked Michigan upset the defending national champion No. 9 Florida, 41–35, in the 2008 Capital One Bowl in Orlando, Florida. Florida was led by third-year head coach Urban Meyer and sophomore quarterback Tim Tebow, who won the 2007 Heisman Trophy weeks earlier. Michigan head coach Lloyd Carr announced his retirement prior to the game, and Carr's replacement, Rich Rodriguez, watched the game from the sidelines.

On the opening possession, Michigan mounted a 94-yard touchdown drive, including a 25-yard run by Mike Hart, a behind-the-back catch by Adrian Arrington, and a 21-yard touchdown pass from Chad Henne to Mario Manningham. Later in the quarter, Florida drove 59 yards, scoring on a nine-yard touchdown pass from Tebow to Percy Harvin.

Late in the first quarter, a long punt return and a personal foul penalty gave Florida the ball at Michigan's 29-yard line; Florida took the lead on an 18-yard touchdown pass from Tebow to Andre Caldwell at the 14:48 mark of the second quarter. Michigan responded with a 56-yard drive capped by a three-yard touchdown run by Hart. Florida then drove inside the Michigan five-yard line, but Michigan's defense sacked Tebow at the 20-yard line and blocked Florida's field goal attempt. Michigan then drove inside the Florida five-yard line on a 68-yard screen pass from Henne to tight end Carson Butler, but the Wolverines turned the ball over on a fumble by Hart at the two-yard line. With two-and-a-half minutes remaining in the half, Michigan drove 62 yards and scored on a one-yard touchdown pass from Henne to Arrington with eight seconds left in the half. Michigan led, 21-14, at halftime.

Michigan began the second half with a pooch kick, and Anton Campbell recovered the ball. Michigan drove 37 yards and scored on a two-yard run by Hart to extend Michigan's lead to 28-14. Florida responded with two third-quarter touchdowns on a one-yard run by Tebow and a 14-yard touchdown pass from Tebow to Caldwell, tying the score at 28-28. Florida's second touchdown of the third quarter followed a fumble by Hart at the goal-line. Hart, who had lost only one fumble in four years at Michigan, lost two against Florida.

Early in the fourth quarter, Michigan retook the lead with a 37-yard field goal by K. C. Lopata. Michigan led, 31-28. With eight minutes remaining, Henne was intercepted on a tipped pass at Michigan's 34-yard line. Florida drove 34 yards on five plays, scoring on a 10-yard reverse to Harvin with 5:49 remaining in the game. Florida led, 35-31. Michigan retook the lead on a 67-yard drive capped by an 18-yard touchdown pass from Henne to Arrington. Michigan concluded the scoring with a 41-yard field goal by Lopata with 2:21 remaining. At the end of the game, Michigan players carried Carr off the field on their shoulders.

Henne and Arrington had career-best games. Henne completed 25 of 39 passes for 373 yard for three touchdowns and two interceptions. Arrington caught nine passes for 153 yards and two touchdowns. Despite two fumbles, Hart gained 129 rushing yards and scored two touchdowns. The Wolverines overcame four Tebow touchdowns (three passing, one rushing), 165 rushing yards and 77 receiving yards by Harvin, and four turnovers.

== Statistical achievements ==
Mike Hart set the following school rushing records: career carries (1015), eclipsing Anthony Thomas' seven-year-old record of 924 and still standing; career yards (5040), also eclipsing Thomas' seven-year-old record of 4472 and still standing; career yards per game (117.2), surpassing Billy Taylor's 102.4 set in 1971 and still standing; career 100-yard games (28), passing Thomas' 22 set in 2000 and still standing; career 150-yard games (12), surpassing Thomas' 9 set in 2000 and still standing; career 200-yard games (5), extending his own record set in 2005 and still standing. Mario Manningham established the school record for consecutive 100-yard reception games with six, surpassing Braylon Edwards' record of 4. Chad Henne broke several of John Navarre's career records established in 2003: attempts (1387), completions (828), yards (9715), touchdown passes (87), and 150-yard passing games (38). Henne also broke Rick Leach's career record for interceptions of 35 set in 1978 with 37.

== Personnel ==
=== Coaching staff ===
- Lloyd Carr – head coach – 28 years at U-M (13 years as head coach)
- Mike DeBord – offensive coordinator/tight ends – 12 years
- Ron English – defensive coordinator/safeties – 5 years
- Erik Campbell – wide receivers/Assistant head coach – 13 years
- Fred Jackson – running backs/associate head coach – 16 years
- Scot Loeffler – quarterbacks – 6 years
- Andy Moeller – offensive line – 8 years
- Steve Stripling – defensive line – 3 years
- Steve Szabo – linebackers – 2 years
- Vance Bedford – secondary – 1 year

=== Roster ===
2007 Michigan Wolverines roster
Wide receiver: 13 Greg Mathews – Sophomore; 16 Adrian Arrington – Senior; 17 Toney Clemons – Freshman; 18 Antonio Bass – Junior; 18 Ben Wright – Senior; 21 Junior Hemingway – Freshman; 26 Wincey Courtbooth – Sophomore; 29 Jon Conover – Sophomore; 82 LaTerryal Savoy – Junior; 84 David Middleton – Sophomore; 86 Mario Manningham – Junior; Offensive lineman: 50 David Molk – Freshman; 52 Stephen Schilling – Sophomore; 57 Zac Ciullo – Freshman; 57 Adam Kraus – 5th Senior; 60 David Moosman – Junior; 61 Patrick Lyall – Senior; 62 Tim McAvoy – Junior; 64 Grant DeBenedictis – Senior; 65 Justin Boren – Sophomore; 68 Bryant Nowicki – Sophomore; 69 Michael Ramirez – Sophomore; 70 Jeremy Ciulla – Senior; 71 Mark Ortmann – Junior; 72 Mark Huyge – Freshman; 73 Alex Mitchell – Senior; 75 Cory Zirbel – Junior; 77 Jake Long – 5th Senior; 79 Perry Dorrestein – Sophomore; 91 Tom Pomarico – Freshman; Tight end: 42 Chris McLaurin – Junior; 80 Martell Webb – Freshman; 81 Steve Watson – Freshman; 83 Mike Massey – Senior; 85 Carson Butler – Junior; 88 Andre Criswell – Junior; 96 Mike Therman – Sophomore	Quarterback: 7 Chad Henne – Senior; 8 Nick Sheridan – Sophomore; 10 Steven Threet – Freshman; 12 David Cone – Sophomore; 15 Ryan Mallett – Freshman; Running back: 4 Brandon Minor – Sophomore; 20 Mike Hart – Senior; 23 Carlos Brown – Sophomore; 24 Kevin Grady – Junior; 34 Avery Horn – Freshman; 35 Jim Potempa – Freshman; 38 Mike Milano – Junior; Fullback: 32 Vince Helmuth – Freshman; 44 Mark Moundros – Sophomore; Defensive tackle: 62 Jon Saigh – Senior; 67 Terrance Taylor – Junior; 74 Brett Gallimore – Senior; 91 Marques Slocum – Sophomore; 93 Jason Kates – Sophomore; 94 John Ferrara – Sophomore; 95 Renaldo Sagesse – Freshman; 97 Will Johnson – Senior; Defensive end: 39 Will Heininger – Freshman; 53 Ryan Van Bergen – Freshman; 55 Brandon Graham – Sophomore; 89 Tim North – Junior; 90 Tim Jamison – Senior; 92 Greg Banks – Sophomore; 99 Adam Patterson – Sophomore; Defensive end: 59 Lawrence Perry – Freshman; Cornerback: 14 Morgan Trent – Senior; 27 Brandon Harrison – Junior; 35 Doug Dutch – Senior; 6 Donovan Warren – Freshman; 29 Troy Woolfolk – Freshman; 27 Brandon Harrison – Junior; Defensive back: 27 Shakir Edwards – Senior; 30 James Rogers II – Freshman; 40 Michael Williams – Freshman	Linebacker: 2 Shawn Crable – 5th Senior; 8 Jonas Mouton – Sophomore; 33 Marell Evans – Freshman; 37 Chris Graham – Senior; 45 Obi Ezeh – Sophomore; 46 Brandon Logan – Junior; 49 John Thompson – Senior; 50 Ohene Opong-Owusu – Junior; 51 Max Pollock – 5th Senior; 54 Austin Panter – Junior; 58 Brandon Herron – Freshman; 66 William Bostic – Sophomore; 69 Brian Berend – Freshman; 11 James Keyes - "Freshman"; Safety: 3 Stevie Brown – Sophomore; 5 Charles Stewart – Senior; 9 Anton Campbell – 5th Senior; 14 Matt Hornaday – Junior; 22 Jamar Adams – Senior; 22 Doug Rogan – Freshman; 28 Jordan Reilly – Freshman; 31 Brandon Englemon – 5th Senior; 38 Artis Chambers – Freshman; Long snapper: 28 Jordan Reilly – Freshman; 59 Sean Griffin – Senior; 63 Brendan Lopez – Freshman; Punter: 39 Ankit Kachhal – 5th Senior; 41 Zoltan Mesko – Junior; Place kicker: 34 Jason Gingell – Senior; 43 Bryan Wright – Sophomore; 84 K. C. Lopata – Senior; 92 Jason Olesnavage – Junior; 99 Sam Buckman – Sophomore

== Awards and honors ==
- All-American

- Jake Long, offensive tackle - consensus All-American with first-team honors from the Associated Press (AP), American Football Coaches Association, Football Writers Association of America, Walter Camp Football Foundation (WCFF), and The Sporting News
- Mario Manningham, wide receiver - second-team honors from AP and WCFF
- Mike Hart, running back - second-team honors from AP, third-team honors from WCFF
- Shawn Crable, linebacker - second-team honors from WCFF

- 2007 All-Big Ten Conference football team

- Chade Henne - Coaches-1
- Mike Hart - Coaches-2, Media-2
- Mario Manningham - Coaches-1, Media-1
- Adam Kraus - Coaches-1, Media-1
- Jake Long - Coaches-1, Media-1
- Shawn Crable - Coaches-2, Media-2
- Jamar Adams - Coaches-2, Media-2

- Team awards

- Most valuable player - Mike Hart
- Meyer Morton Award - Chad Henne
- John Maulbetsch Award - Greg Matthews
