= Stephen Schilling =

American football player (born 1988)

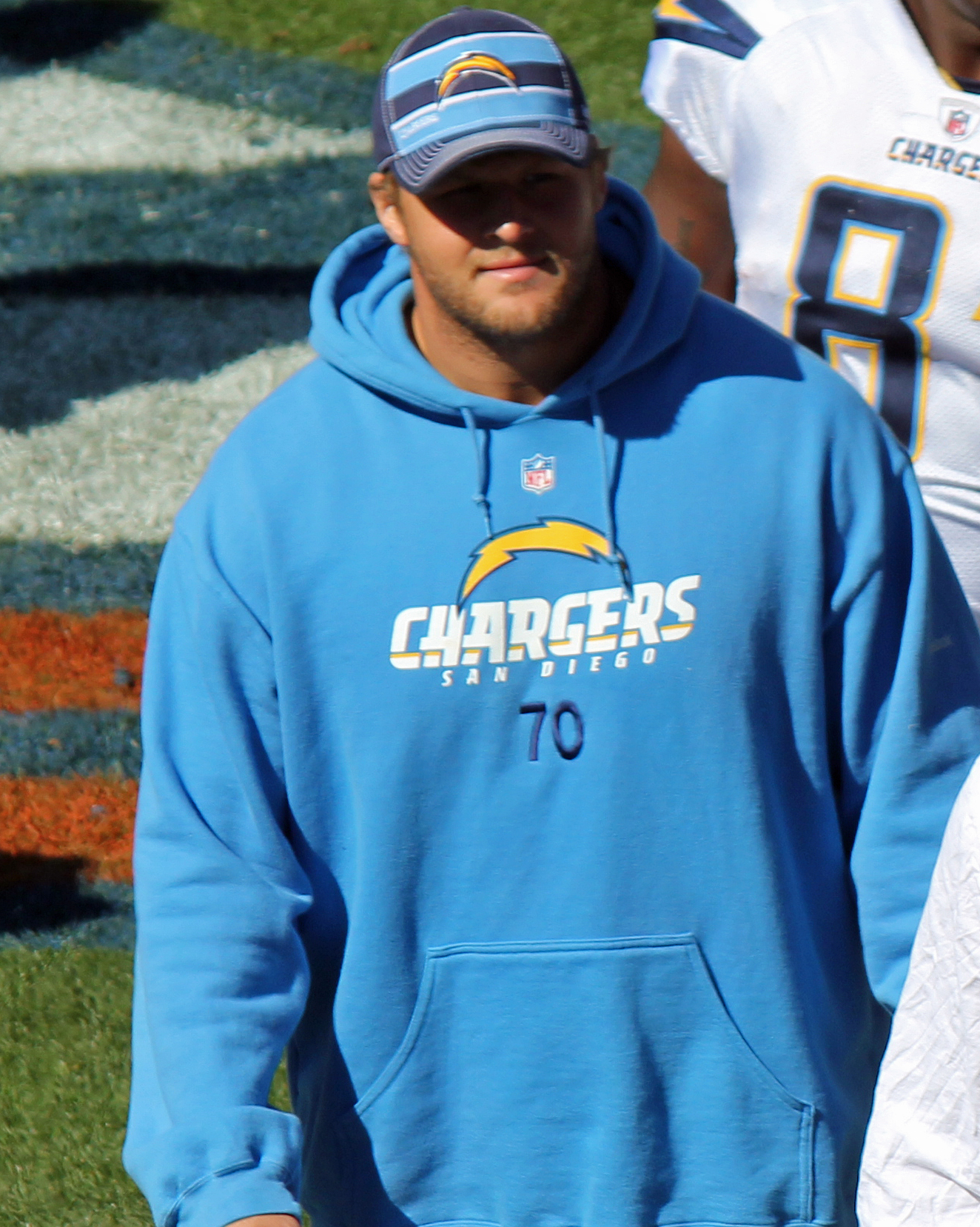
- Schilling with the San Diego Chargers in 2011

No. 70, 72, 63
- Position: Offensive guard

Personal information
- Born: July 21, 1988 (age 38); Bellevue, Washington, U.S.
- Listed height: 6 ft 5 in (1.96 m)
- Listed weight: 312 lb (142 kg)

Career information
- High school: Bellevue
- College: Michigan
- NFL draft: 2011: 6th round, 201st overall pick

Career history
- San Diego Chargers (2011–2013); Seattle Seahawks (2014)

Awards and highlights
- U.S. Army All-American Bowl (2006)

Career NFL statistics
- Games played: 26
- Games started: 5
- Stats at Pro Football Reference

Stephen Dana Schilling (born July 21, 1988) is an American former professional football player who was an offensive guard in the National Football League (NFL). He played college football for the Michigan Wolverines and was included on the 2009 preseason watchlist for the Lombardi Award. He had previously been a two-time Associated Press first-team Class 3A All-state selection in Washington for the Bellevue High School Wolverines football team where he played on three state champion teams.

Born and raised in Bellevue, Washington, Schilling grew up playing basketball until high school. In high school, he was a member of the three-time state champion team. He became a star offensive lineman who was a standout Seattle athlete as his high school won its third consecutive state championship in his junior year. He won numerous all-area and all-state honors as a junior and a senior and was highly touted on the national level. He was selected to play in the U.S. Army All-American Bowl and as one of the nominees for Parade All-American Player of the Year. After being highly recruited by several top college football programs and narrowing his list to several Pacific-10 Conference football teams and University of Michigan, he decided to attend Michigan.

At Michigan, he redshirted as a true Freshman and then started the following year. When the team transitioned from head coach Lloyd Carr to Rich Rodriguez during his redshirt sophomore season, he became one of the few experienced players to endure the change. He has since anchored the offensive line composed of less experienced players. He was honored as the 2008 Michigan Wolverines football team's best offensive lineman as a redshirt sophomore before being nationally recognized as a Lombardi Award watchlist candidate in 2009. He was selected as a 2009 and 2010 All-Big Ten Conference honorable mention. He was a 2010 Outland Trophy watch list candidate.

He was selected by the San Diego Chargers in the sixth round of the 2011 NFL draft. He began his NFL career on the practice squad. He was activated prior to week 8 of the 2011 NFL season (his rookie year), and played in several subsequent games for the team. He has also played for the Seattle Seahawks. He announced his retirement on April 2, 2015.

== Early life ==
When Schilling was young, he was too large to play organized football with kids his own age because Bellevue's youth leagues were regulated by weight-age limits, which caused him to take up basketball instead. Schilling says that his true love was basketball and that he would probably not have experimented with football, but the coach of the basketball team resigned right before his freshman season. During the summer prior to his freshman year, Schilling first visited the Bellevue High School weight room where he noticed the intensity and camaraderie. He eventually became a three-year starter for the football team. As a sophomore, Schilling was part of the Bellevue championship football team whose season extended long enough to interfere with him participating in the early part of the basketball season as a sophomore. The championship, which came as a result of a ten-game winning streak to close the season, made the Bellevue Wolverines three-time Class 3A state champions. On September 4, 2004, as a junior, he helped Bellevue end the high school football record 151-game winning streak by De La Salle High School in front of 24,987 at the second annual Emerald City Kickoff Classic at Qwest Field by a 39–20 score.

Early in his junior season, he got his first scholarship offer from the University of Washington. The 6-foot-5-inch (1.96 m) 280-pound (130 kg) Schilling, who wore #52 in high school, played on both the offensive line and defensive line. Prior to the state championship game he was named to the All-area football team by The Seattle Times. He helped his 13–0 team become the first school from the state of Washington to win five state championships in 2004. For the championship week effort Schilling, who played offensive tackle, was selected as The Seattle Times' Class 3A male athlete of the week. During the season, Schilling was known for his training habits. At the end of the football season, he was selected to All-State teams both by the Associated Press and The Seattle Times. During his junior basketball season, he was a solid contributor to team scoring and rebounding. He averaged 10.6 points/game during his junior season. At the end of his junior year he was named the number 25 football prospect in the nation and the number three offensive tackle by Rivals.com. In July prior to his senior season, he was included in a Reebok Western All-American list in Sports Illustrated.

Early in his senior season, running a Wing T offense, Bellevue again defeated a highly regarded California high school in a game at Qwest Field. On September 16, 2009, they defeated the Long Beach Polytechnic High School, who had been ranked number three by the USA Today. At the end of September, he left a game in the second quarter with what was thought to be a separated shoulder. He spent the following three weeks on the sidelines with a sore shoulder. In his October 28 return, Bellevue snapped their 30-game winning streak. During the first ten games of the season, Bellevue averaged 11 yards per rush. In the eleventh game, the team lost in the state quarterfinals. Schilling ended his career having played for three state champions. Schilling was one of sixteen nominees for the Parade All-America High School Player of the Year award. He was selected to the local all-star teams by both The Seattle Times and Seattle Post-Intelligencer. He repeated as an Associated Press Class 3A All-state selection. Schilling was selected to play in the January 7, 2006 U.S. Army All-American Bowl. Although he was highly regarded as a tackle, he started at right guard for the west during the game. He became a Parade All-American. Schilling did not play basketball during his senior year to avoid the risk of injury.

Although he was highly recruited during the season, he decided not to make his decision until after the season ended. He scheduled visits with the Cal Bears and USC Trojans and anticipated visits with the Michigan Wolverines and Washington Huskies. Those were the four schools he was seriously considering. He eventually changed his visit dates, but the final four contenders remained the same. By the time he was to make his final decision he had 20 scholarship offers. In his final week of consideration, he eliminated USC from contention and had home visits from the other three finalists during the week. He made his final selection in what has become a traditional recruit announcement technique by using the schools' caps in front of his extended family, including his mother who is named Joanne and a sister. He also has an Aunt Lydia Schilling.

College recruiting
Name	Hometown	School	Height	Weight	40^{‡}	Commit date
Stephen Schilling; OT	Bellevue, Washington	Bellevue (WA)	6 ft 5 in (1.96 m)	290 lb (130 kg)	4.9	Jan 26, 2006
Stephen Schilling; OT	Recruit ratings: Scout: Rivals: (80)					
Overall recruit ranking: Scout: 3 (OL) Rivals: 26, 2 (OT), 2 (WA) ESPN: 135
Note: In many cases, Scout, Rivals, 247Sports, On3, and ESPN may conflict in their listings of height and weight.; In these cases, the average was taken. ESPN grades are on a 100-point scale.; Sources: "Michigan Football Commitments". Rivals.; "2006 Michigan Football Commits". Scout.; "ESPN". ESPN.; "Scout.com Team Recruiting Rankings". Scout.; "2006 Team Ranking". Rivals.com.

== College ==
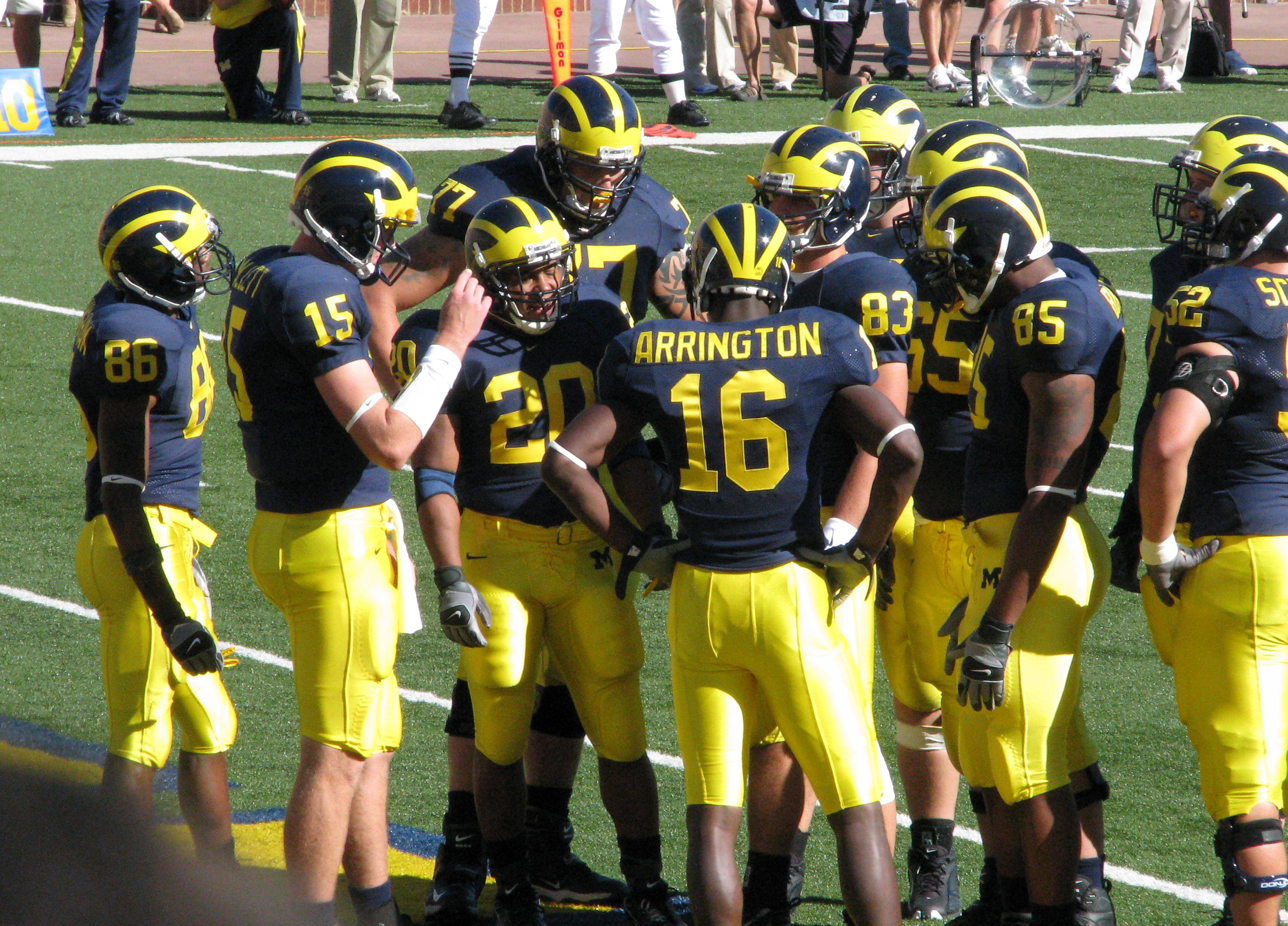
2007 Michigan Wolverines huddle with Mario Manningham (86), Ryan Mallett (15), Mike Hart (20), Jake Long (77, behind Hart), Adrian Arrington (16), Mike Massey (83), Justin Boren (65), Carson Butler (85), and Schilling (partially in view on right) (52).

Schilling did not arrive in Ann Arbor, Michigan in time for 2006 spring practice like some of his classmates. Just prior to the 2006 NCAA Division I FBS football season opener for the 2006 Michigan Wolverines football team, Schilling was diagnosed with mononucleosis. This caused him to miss several weeks of practice. In late October, he decided to redshirt and have a second shoulder surgery after having missed weeks of practice and lost much weight. As part of his transition from a Wing T offense that rarely passed, Schilling had to work on improving his pass blocking.

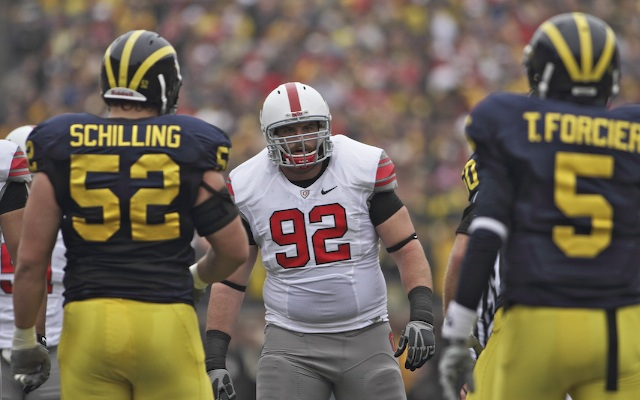
Schilling lines up across from Todd Denlinger for the 2009 Michigan Wolverines against Ohio State during the November 21 Michigan – Ohio State rivalry game.

He earned the starting right tackle position in a battle with Mark Ortmann and Perry Dorrestein at the start of the 2007 NCAA Division I FBS football season for the 2007 Michigan Wolverines football team. He was the starter on September 1 during the opening game loss to two-time defending FCS champion Appalachian State Mountaineers. After starting the first five games at right tackle, Schilling moved to right guard for two games (Eastern Michigan and Purdue) as a result of injuries to some of his other teammates. He was expected to start a third game at right guard, but he was returned to right tackle. During practice, he had to spend time at both positions after the injuries. Although he did not start at guard until the sixth game, he played guard in the opener after Jeremy Ciulla got injured. Although, he had to stretch beyond his past experiences and natural position, he was able to seek fifth-year seniors Jake Long and Adam Kraus as mentors. The 2007 rivalry game against Ohio State was a prime example of his lack of experience with pass blocking. He had difficulties pass blocking against Vernon Gholston, who posted three quarterback sacks.

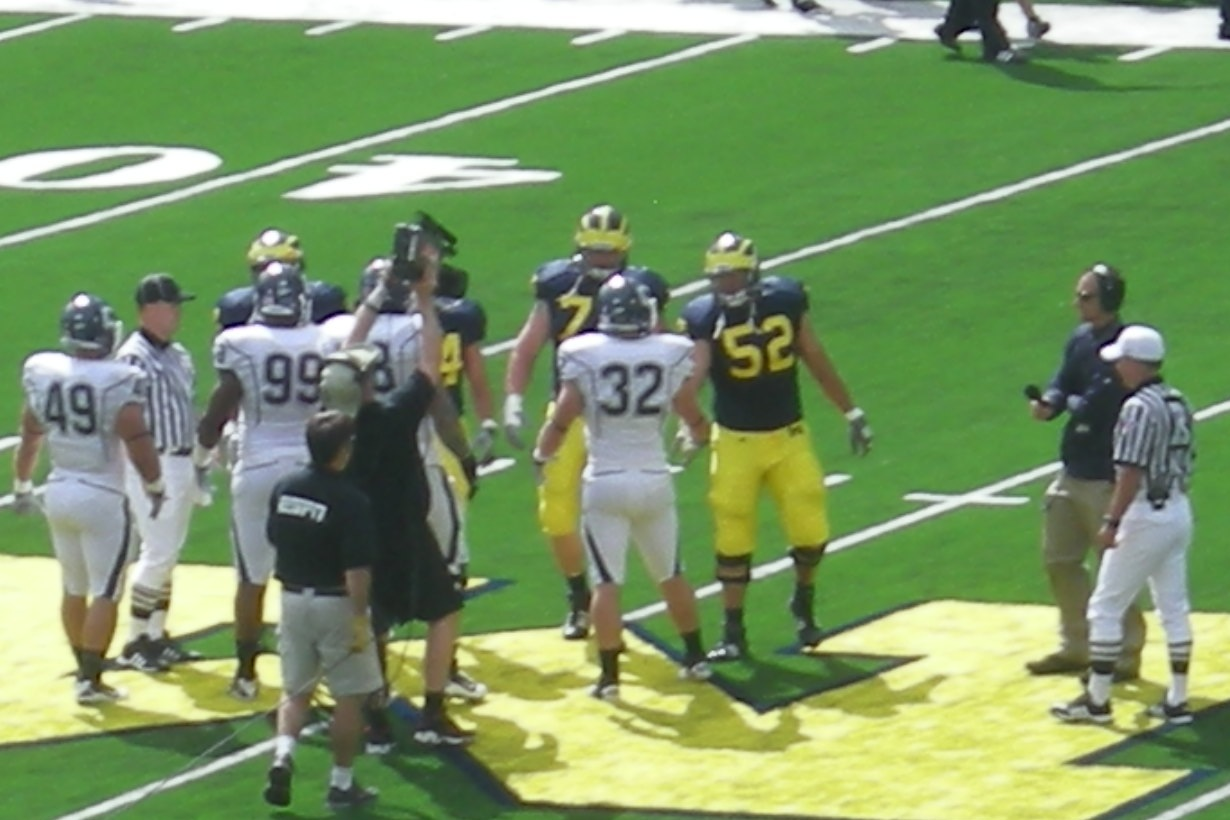
Schilling takes the coin toss as captain of the 2010 Michigan Wolverines football team

With the departure of Mike Hart, Mario Manningham, Adrian Arrington, Jake Long, Chad Henne, and Adam Kraus to the National Football League and Justin Boren's defection from the team, the 2008 Michigan Wolverines football team entered the season for new head coach Rich Rodriguez with only three returning offensive starters: Schilling, tight end Carson Butler and fullback Mark Moundros. Backup quarterback Ryan Mallett transferred and two senior offensive linemen (Jeremy Ciulla and Alex Mitchell) declined to use their fifth years of eligibility. Schilling was virtually the only returning offensive lineman with any experience. Aside from Schilling, the projected opening game starting offensive line had a total of three career starts. Offensive line injuries continued to affect the lineup through the early part of the season with David Molk (center), David Moosman (right guard) and Schilling (right tackle) being the only players to start each of the first four games. Even Schilling was a bit injured, causing him to be handled delicately during practice. In the first five games, the team used four different starting offensive line combinations due to injuries. For much of the season, Rodriguez' offense started six freshmen. By the seventh game the line returned to full strength and used the opening day lineup. In the week before the last game of the season against Ohio State, Schilling injured his knee in practice. As a result, he did not play in the final game. Nonetheless, he was honored by the team at the end of the season as the team's best offensive lineman. The young offense had all but one of its starters returning for the following season.

2010 Michigan Wolverines football team offense

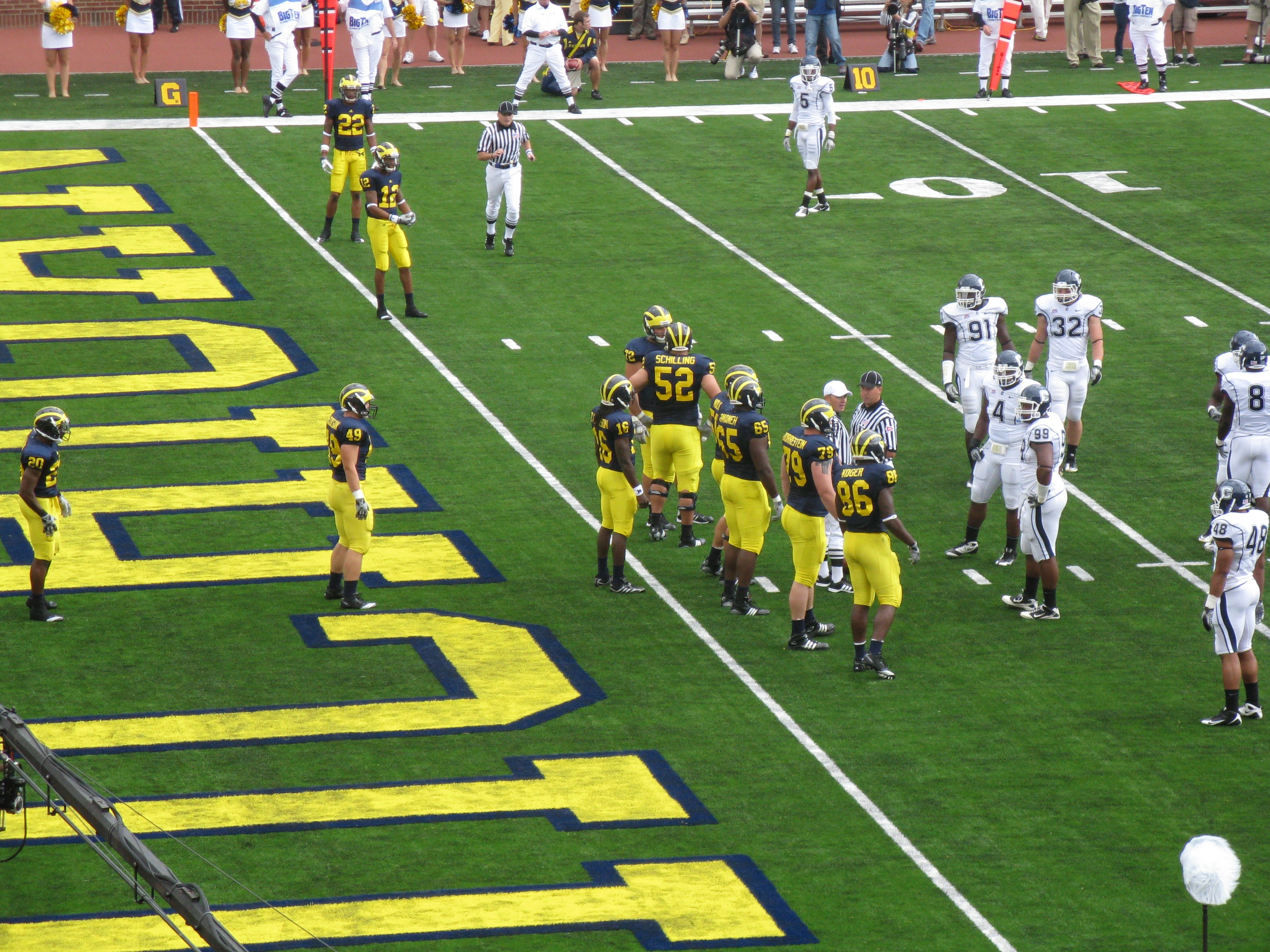
#16 Denard Robinson, #20 Michael Shaw, #22 Darryl Stonum, #12 Roy Roundtree, #86 Kevin Koger, #52 Schilling, and #50 David Molk as well as #79 Perry Dorrestein, #65 Patrick Omamehand, and #72 Mark Huyge

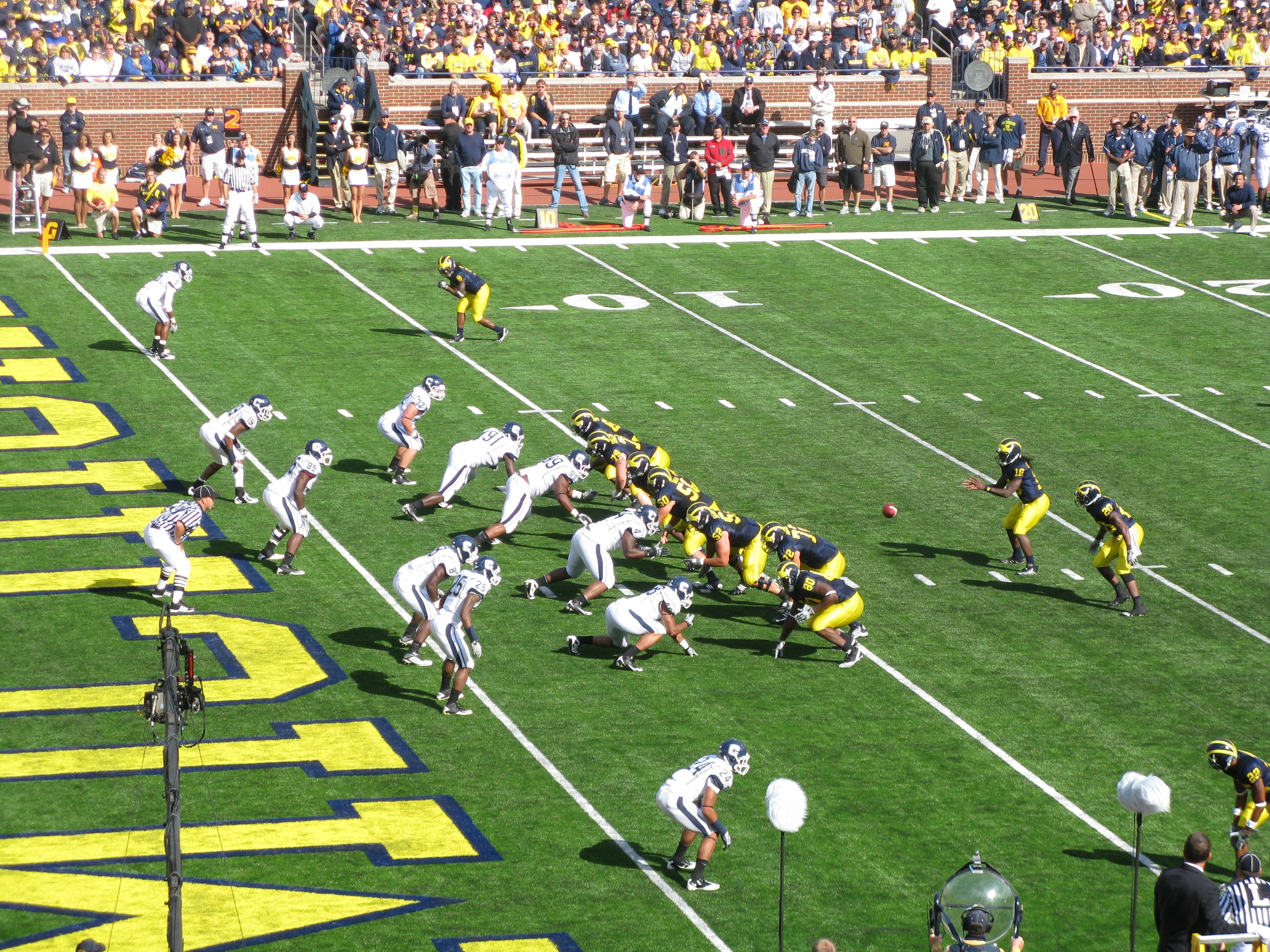
#16 Denard Robinson, #20 Michael Shaw, #22 Darryl Stonum, #9 Martavious Odoms, #52 Schilling, and #50 David Molk as well as #79 Perry Dorrestein, #80 Martell Webb, and #72 Mark Huyge

As a fourth-year junior, Schilling entered the 2009 NCAA Division I FBS football season opener with the second most career starts (26) on the 2009 Michigan Wolverines football team behind punter Zoltan Mesko (38). He switched to left guard from right tackle in 2009. In the Ohio State game, he was notable for losing a shoe during the game and trying to play without it. He was recognized as an honorable mention 2009 All-Big Ten Conference selection by both the coaches and the media.

As a fifth-year senior, Stephen Schilling was watchlisted for the Outland Trophy award for lineman. He was also, elected co-captain and participated in a season long fanmail program where he responded to Michigan fan questions made by email and on Facebook every Friday. Following the Big Ten Conference season, he was selected as an honorable mention All-Conference selection by both the coaches and the media. Following the season, he participated in the 2011 Senior Bowl. During Schilling's senior season, Denard Robinson had a record-setting season on offense: he broke Drew Brees' Big Ten single-season total offense record of 4,189 yards. Robinson fell 116 yards short of Tim Biakabutuka's Michigan school record of 1,818 rushing yards. However, he led the conference in both total offense and rushing yards per game.

== Professional career ==
=== Pre-draft ===
Pre-draft measurables
Height	Weight	Arm length	Hand span	Wingspan	40-yard dash	10-yard split	20-yard split	20-yard shuttle	Three-cone drill	Vertical jump	Broad jump	Bench press
6 ft 4 1/4 in (1.94 m)	308 lb (140 kg)	32 3/4 in (0.83 m)	9 5/8 in (0.24 m)	6 ft 7 1/8 in (2.01 m)	5.29 s	1.83 s	3.03 s	4.62 s	7.73 s	25.5 in (0.65 m)	8 ft 2 in (2.49 m)	30 reps
All values from NFL Combine

Schilling was one of 56 offensive linemen invited to participate in the February 24 – March 1, 2011 NFL Scouting Combine. He ranked sixth in the bench press with a total of 30 repetitions. He ranked ninth in the 20-yard shuttle with a time of 4.62.

=== San Diego Chargers ===
Schilling was selected with the 201st overall pick in the sixth round of the 2011 NFL draft by the San Diego Chargers. He was waived by the Chargers on September 3, 2011, but was signed to the practice squad on September 5, 2011. Schilling was activated from the practice squad on October 26, 2011. He was activated prior to week 8, but did not play. Schilling played in the subsequent weeks and started in both weeks 11 & 12. In week 13, he was not in the starting lineup, but remained active and played. Schilling was released from the roster on August 31, 2012. He was re-signed by the Chargers on December 4, 2012. Schilling was released by the Chargers on August 31, 2013, during the last round of preseason roster cuts. On September 25, 2013, the Chargers re-signed Schilling.

=== Seattle Seahawks ===
Schilling signed with the Seattle Seahawks on March 20, 2014. Schilling was placed on season-ending Injured Reserve on November 8, 2014, with a knee injury. Schilling opted to retire on April 2, 2015.

== Personal ==
As of 24 September 2010, he had a girlfriend named Katie who was a University of Michigan Law School student and who was a Michigan Women's soccer player as an undergraduate. He is a recreational golfer. Also in high school, he was teammates with Pittsburgh Steelers Guard David DeCastro.
