= David Molk =

American football player (born 1988)

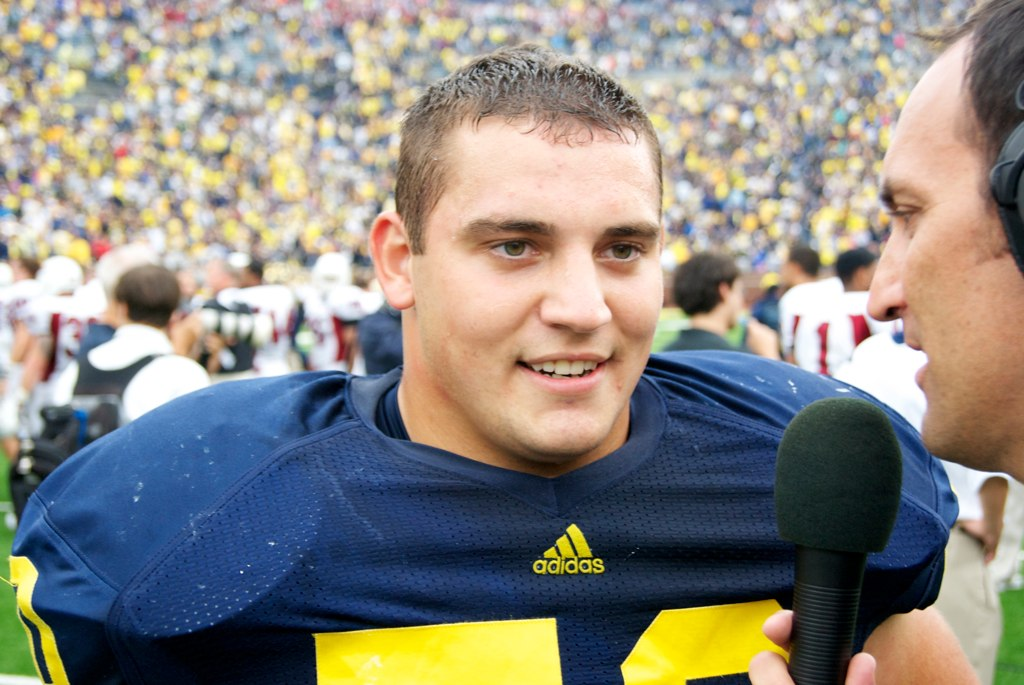
- Molk with Michigan in 2010

No. 60, 63
- Position: Center

Personal information
- Born: December 15, 1988 (age 37); Palos Hills, Illinois, U.S.
- Listed height: 6 ft 1 in (1.85 m)
- Listed weight: 290 lb (132 kg)

Career information
- High school: Lemont (Lemont, Illinois)
- College: Michigan (2007–2011)
- NFL draft: 2012: 7th round, 226th overall pick

Career history
- San Diego Chargers (2012); Philadelphia Eagles (2014–2015)

Awards and highlights
- Rimington Trophy (2011); Consensus All-American (2011); Big Ten Offensive Lineman of the Year (2011); 2× First-team All-Big Ten (2010, 2011)

Career NFL statistics
- Games played: 20
- Games started: 4
- Stats at Pro Football Reference

David Michael Molk (born December 15, 1988) is an American former professional football player who was a center in the National Football League (NFL) for the San Diego Chargers and the Philadelphia Eagles. Molk played college football for the Michigan Wolverines, where he was a consensus All-American and the Rimington Trophy winner in 2011, as the best center in college football. He was selected by the Chargers in the 2012 NFL draft.

Molk grew up in the Chicago area and played high school football at Lemont Township High School. He was named an All-State player by the Chicago Tribune and was selected to play in the first East-West All-America Football Game in January 2007.

Molk enrolled at the University of Michigan in 2007. In 2010, Molk was the cornerstone in an offensive line that helped Denard Robinson break the Big Ten Conference single-season record with 4,189 yards of total offense. Molk was recognized as a first-team All-Big Ten Conference player at the end of the 2010 season. In 2011, Molk anchored a line that led the way for Denard Robinson and Fitzgerald Toussaint to become Michigan's first duo of 1,000-yard rushers since 1975.

== Early life ==
Molk was once a 5-foot-6-inch (1.68 m) 175-pound (79 kg) Lemont Township High School freshman who could only bench press 110 pounds (50 kg) and squat 250 pounds (110 kg). By the end of his junior year, he was one of the most highly recruited high school football players in the Chicago metropolitan area. By his senior season, he was a 6-foot-2-inch (1.88 m) 270-pound (120 kg) center who could bench press 370 pounds (170 kg), squat 550 pounds (250 kg) and power clean 320 pounds (150 kg). His high school gym closed at 5:00 PM and he had to go into town for extra workout time. He chose to be a center because, although he is too short to be a major Division I college football offensive guard or offensive tackle, he had the potential to be a successful center. He was actually discovered when a scout came to his school to watch a teammate. During the summer prior to his senior season, he made a verbal commitment to the University of Michigan, in part due to its business school, the Ross School of Business. At the end of his junior year he had received scholarship offers from ten schools, including six Big Ten Conference football programs.

As a senior, Molk was selected to numerous All-area football teams by various organizations including The Star, Daily Southtown, and Prep Football Report selected by Tom Lemming. In addition, he was selected to the Chicago Tribune All-State team, and he was selected to play in the first East-West All-America Football Game sponsored by ESPN and MLS Sports in Orlando, Florida suburb Lake Buena Vista on January 6, 2007. Molk was also an honors student in his senior year of high school.

College recruiting
Name	Hometown	School	Height	Weight	40^{‡}	Commit date
David Molk; C	Lemont, Illinois	Lemont (IL)	6 ft 1.5 in (1.87 m)	275 lb (125 kg)	5.0	Aug 3, 2006
David Molk; C	Recruit ratings: Scout: Rivals: (78)					
Overall recruit ranking: Scout: 3 (C) Rivals: 5 (C), 7 (IL) ESPN: 6 (C)
Note: In many cases, Scout, Rivals, 247Sports, On3, and ESPN may conflict in their listings of height and weight.; In these cases, the average was taken. ESPN grades are on a 100-point scale.; Sources: "Michigan Football Commitments". Rivals.; "2007 Michigan Football Commits". Scout.; "ESPN". ESPN.; "Scout.com Team Recruiting Rankings". Scout.; "2007 Team Ranking". Rivals.com.

== College career ==
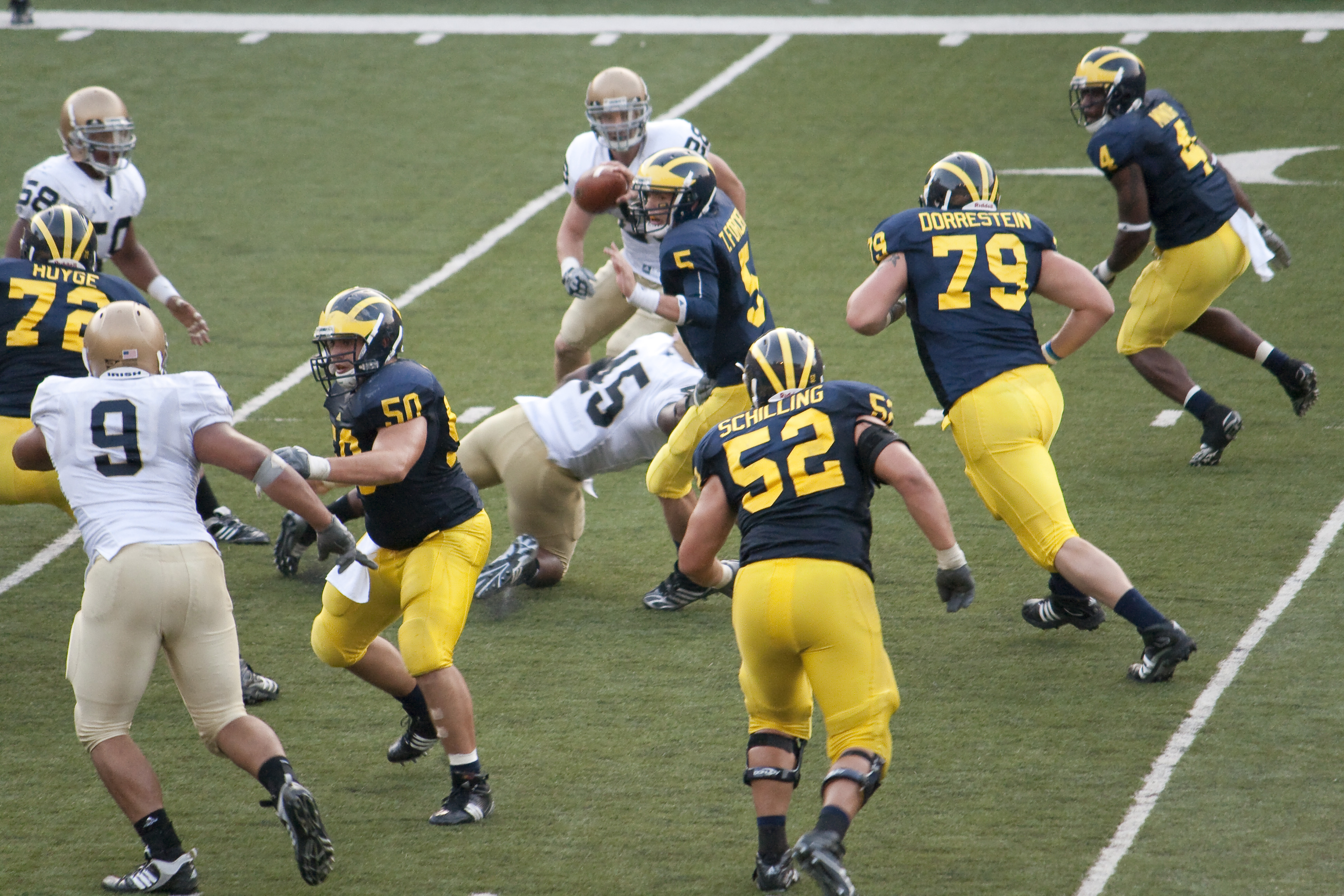
Molk (50) lines up a block during 2009 Michigan – Notre Dame game.

Molk attended the University of Michigan, where he played for the Michigan Wolverines football team from 2007 to 2011. Entering the 2007 NCAA Division I FBS football season, Molk was a serious contender to start in the season opener due to injuries for the 2007 Michigan Wolverines football team. Upon the arrival of new head coach Rich Rodriguez in the spring prior to the 2008 NCAA Division I FBS football season, Molk was expected to be a starter for the 2008 Michigan Wolverines football team after redshirtting the prior year. He spent the summer after his redshirt season perfecting the shotgun formation snap. However, he endured a serious undisclosed illness that caused him to lose 15 pounds (6.8 kg) and found himself in a battle with redshirt junior David Moosman to be the starting center. As his struggles continued, it was revealed that he had mononucleosis. Despite his struggles, he was awarded the Iron Wolverine Award at the spring football awards in recognition of his superior conditioning based on a series of physical tests. As a result of injuries, both Moosman and Molk were in the starting lineup for the 2008 opener. Offensive line injuries continued to affect the lineup through the early part of the season with Molk (center), Moosman (right offensive guard) and Stephen Schilling (right offensive tackle) being the only players to start each of the first four games. Molk injured his toe at the end Little Brown Jug game against Minnesota of the November 8, 2008, but he was fine the following week. As the young offense finished the season with a 3–9 record, it expected its entire starting offensive line to return the following season. In fact, considering injuries, the team returned a total of seven offensive linemen who started games.

2010 Michigan Wolverines football team offense

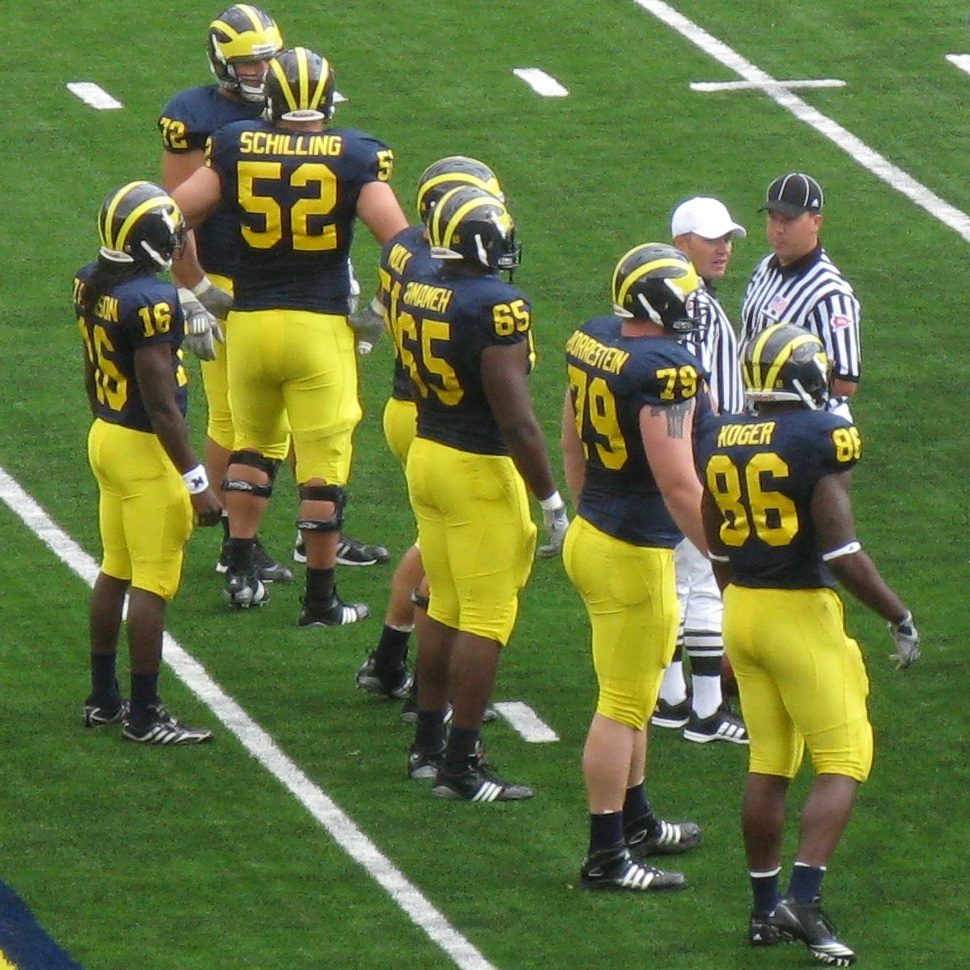
#16 Denard Robinson, #86 Kevin Koger, #52 Stephen Schilling, and #50 Molk as well as #79 Perry Dorrestein, #65 Patrick Omameh, and #72 Mark Huyge

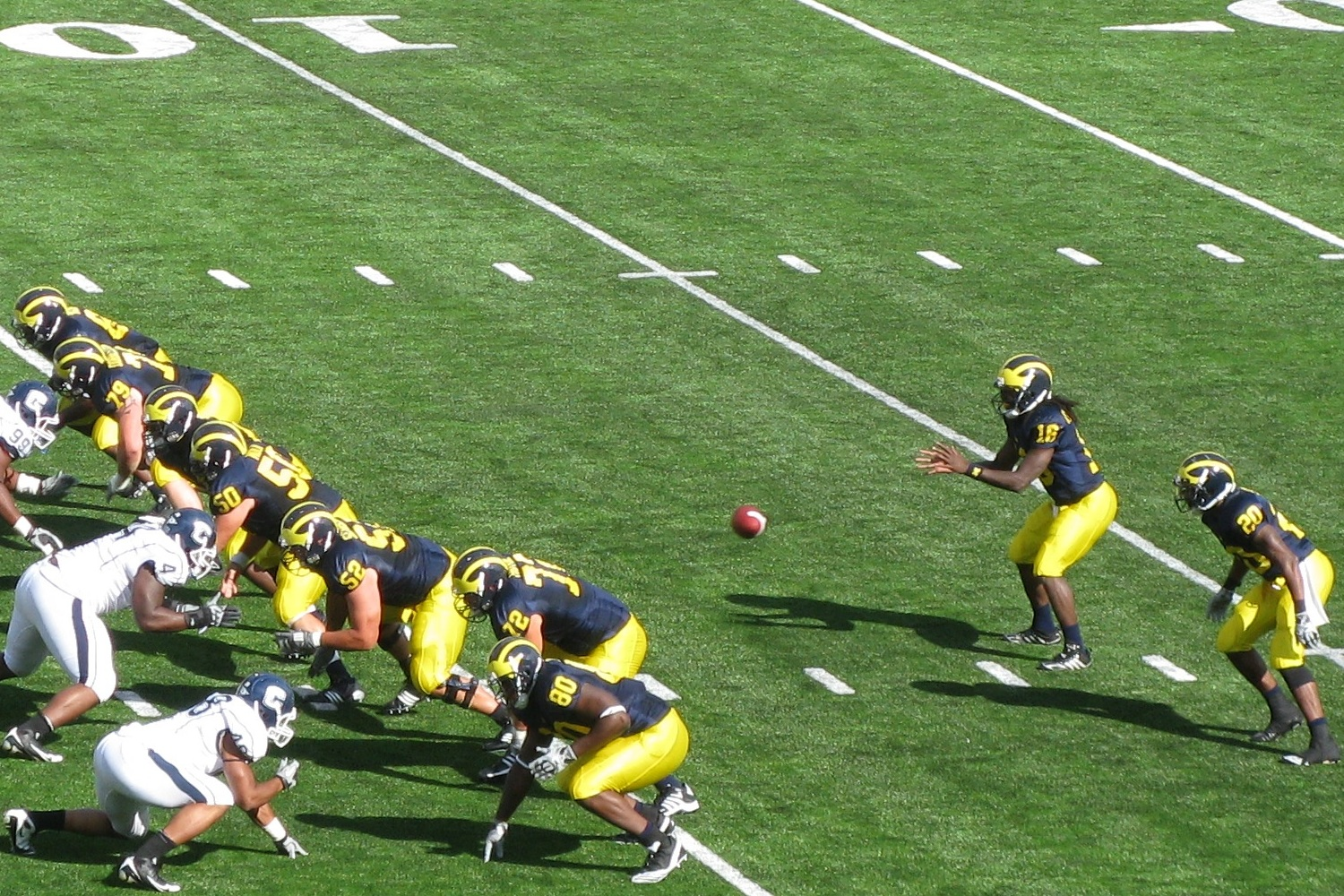
#16 Denard Robinson, #20 Michael Shaw, #52 Stephen Schilling, #50 Molk as well as #79 Perry Dorrestein, #80 Martell Webb, and #72 Mark Huyge

In Molk's second year of spring football he earned the sophomore award for toughness and work ethic during the Michigan spring football awards. By the end of the spring he was among the 44 centers on the 2009 Rimington Trophy spring watch list for the 2009 NCAA Division I FBS football season. He was also included on the watch list for the 2009 Lombardi Award. Molk suffered a broken foot in the third game of the season as the 2009 Wolverines pushed their record to 3–0 and had surgery two days later. He was expected to miss 4–6 weeks. After missing four games, he returned to practice. However, during the subsequent game against Penn State on October 24, he tore knee ligaments and was lost for the season as well as spring football.

As a redshirt junior, he was selected to the 2010 preseason Rimington Trophy watchlist for the 2010 Michigan Wolverines football team and later a finalist after the regular season had concluded. That season Denard Robinson established numerous quarterback rushing records lining up behind and often running behind Molk. He broke Drew Brees' Big Ten single-season total offense record of 4,189 yards. Robinson fell 116 yards short of Tim Biakabutuka's Michigan school record of 1,818 rushing yards. However, he led the conference in both total offense and rushing yards per game. Following the Big Ten conference regular season, Molk was a first-team All-conference selection by the coaches and second-team member as selected by the media. He was also recognized by Sports Illustrated as an honorable mention All-American.

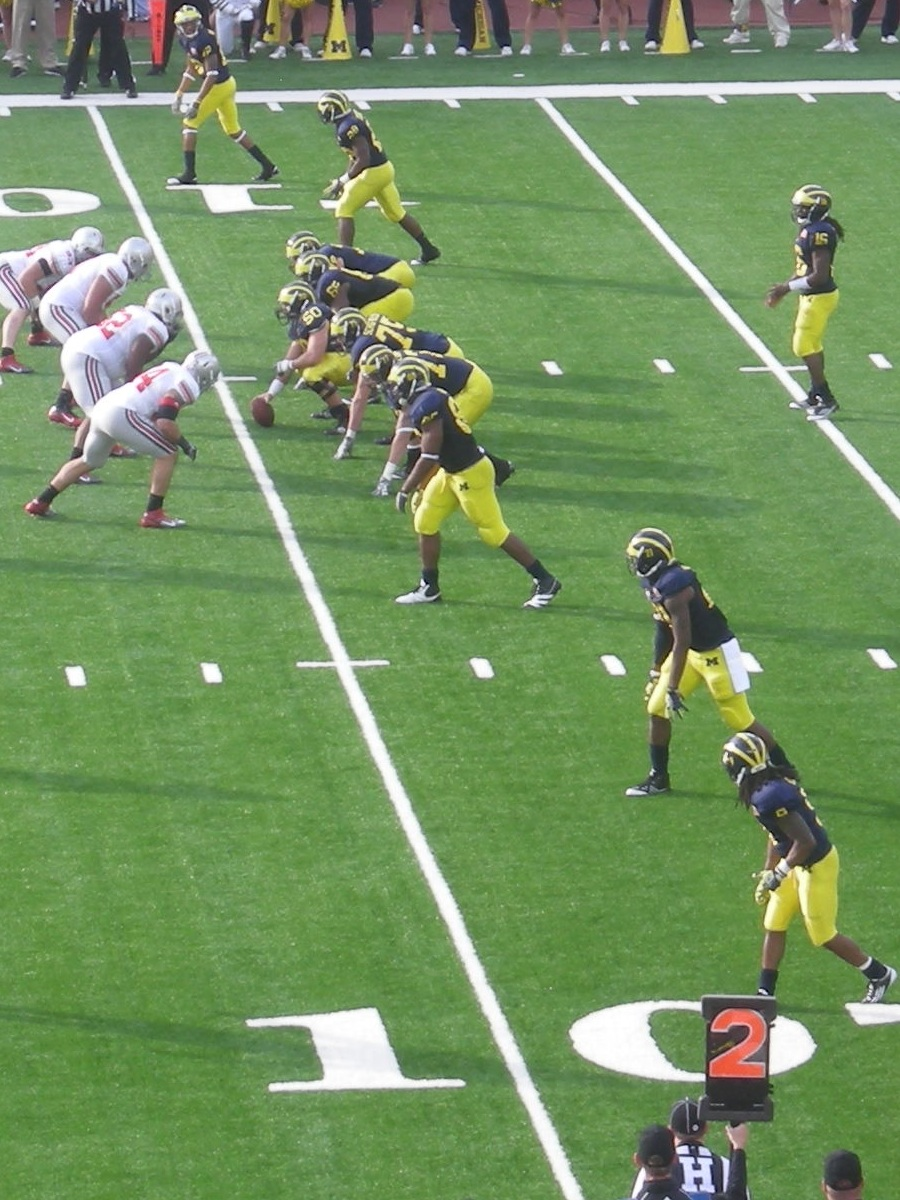
Molk at center in the 2011 Michigan-Ohio State rivalry game

As a fifth-year senior, he was selected to three preseason watchlists: the Outland Trophy list, which goes to the nation's top interior lineman; the Lombardi Award watch list, which is awarded to the nation's top lineman; and the Rimington Trophy watch list, which is awarded to the nation's top center. During the season, Michigan had two 1000-yard rushers (Robinson and Fitzgerald Toussaint) for the first time since the 1975 team. He earned the 2011 Big Ten Conference Rimington-Pace Offensive Lineman of the Year Award (the first year it was thus named) and was a repeat first-team All-Big Ten Conference selection by the coaches and a second-team selection by the media. The following week, he was named a finalist for the Rimington Trophy. A few days later, he was declared the Rimington Trophy winner. He was also first-team All-American selection by AP, Football Writers Association of America, Scout.com, Sporting News and the Walter Camp Football Foundation, which resulted in him becoming a consensus All-American. He was a third-team All-American selection by Yahoo! Sports and an honorable mention All-American selectee by Sports Illustrated and the Pro Football Weekly. Molk was invited to participate in the January 28, 2012 Senior Bowl, and he was an early invite to the February 22–28, 2012 NFL Scouting Combine.

== Professional career ==
=== Pre-draft ===
Molk was one of 54 offensive linemen, and the fourth-ranked center—behind Peter Konz, Garth Gerhart, and Ben Jones—, that participated in the 2012 NFL Scouting Combine. However, he tore the peroneal longus tendon in his foot at the 2012 Sugar Bowl, and he had surgery on January 13. As a result, he was only able to participate in one Combine event. His 41 reps in the bench press ranked first among offensive linemen and second at the entire combine, behind only nose tackle Dontari Poe. Molk's total was most by a center and ranks fourth among offensive lineman since 2000, behind only Russell Bodine, Mitch Petrus and Scott Young, who were centers and offensive guards.

Pre-draft measurables
Height	Weight	Arm length	Hand span	Wingspan	Bench press
6 ft 0 7/8 in (1.85 m)	298 lb (135 kg)	32 in (0.81 m)	8 7/8 in (0.23 m)	6 ft 5 in (1.96 m)	41 reps
All values from NFL Combine

=== San Diego Chargers ===
He was selected by the San Diego Chargers in the seventh round of the 2012 NFL Draft with the 226th selection overall. He was one of three Michigan Wolverines and 41 Big Ten players drafted. On May 8, 2012, he signed a four-year contract. He played 12 games for the 2012 San Diego Chargers, mostly on special teams and as an extra lineman in short yardage situations, before being placed on injured reserve on December 4, 2012. Molk was one of 11 players released by the Chargers on August 31, 2013, during the last round of preseason roster cuts.

=== Philadelphia Eagles ===
On January 9, 2014, he signed a futures contract with the Philadelphia Eagles. He was placed on injured reserve with a torn bicep after the second game of the 2015 NFL season by the Eagles on September 14, 2015. Molk announced his retirement from the NFL on March 4, 2016.

== Personal life ==
David Molk lives outside Chicago in Lemont, Illinois, with his widowed father, his mother having died from breast cancer when he was 12. After the controversial semi-autobiographical book NFL Confidential: True Confessions from the Gutter of Football was released in 2016, multiple Redditors guessed the unknown author, nicknamed "Johnny Anonymous" in the book, was actually Molk due to the similarities between the narrator's experiences and the 2014 Philadelphia Eagles season, when Molk had been a backup center with the team. Additionally, other online sleuths noted in media interviews his name had accidentally been given as "David Anonymous". As of 2021, Molk is the co-owner and VP of Thomas Sales and Marketing in Chicago alongside his father, Thomas Molk. Their company website contains a note that he did indeed author NFL Confidential.
