= 2008 Capital One Bowl =

American college football game

Michigan Wolverines	Florida Gators
(8–4)	(9–3)
Big Ten	SEC
41	35
Head coach: Lloyd Carr	Head coach: Urban Meyer
	AP / Coaches / BCS; 9 / 12 / 12
	1	2	3	4	Total
Michigan	7	14	7	13	41
Florida	7	7	14	7	35
- Date: January 1, 2008
- Season: 2007
- Stadium: Florida Citrus Bowl
- Location: Orlando, Florida
- MVP: Chad Henne (Michigan QB)
- Favorite: Florida by 10½
- Referee: Jeff Flanagan (ACC)
- Halftime show: Both school bands
- Attendance: 69,748
- Payout: US$4.25 million per team

United States TV coverage
- Network: ABC
- Announcers: Mike Patrick (play-by-play); Todd Blackledge (analyst); Holly Rowe (sideline)
- Nielsen ratings: 9.13

The 2008 Capital One Bowl was held on January 1, 2008, at the Florida Citrus Bowl in Orlando, Florida. The game featured the University of Michigan Wolverines—who finished the 2007 season tied for second in the Big Ten Conference with an overall record of 8–4 (6–2 in the Big Ten)—and the #12 University of Florida Gators—who finished the 2007 season third in the Southeastern Conference's East Division with an overall record of 9–3 (5–3 in the SEC).

== Pre-game buildup ==
This game was significant for several different reasons. It was the last game for the Michigan Wolverines' coach, Lloyd Carr, who had announced his retirement on November 19, 2007. During the game, Carr used a passing spread offense to attack on the first drive against Florida's defense. The game was also the last game for the Michigan senior class, who had lost each of their previous three bowl games. It was also an opportunity for Heisman Trophy winner Tim Tebow and the Florida Gators to play in front of a crowd of mostly Gator fans, as Orlando and Gainesville are separated by less than a two-hour drive.

Coming into this game, Florida was highly favored to win. As Michigan had lost early in the season to Appalachian State and Oregon, teams who both employed a spread offense similar to Florida's, many predicted that Michigan would suffer a similar fate against Florida. However, the Wolverines were able to generate 524 yards of offense in defeating the Gators, turning the ball over four times, twice within one yard of scoring.

This game was a bit of a grudge match because Florida coach, Urban Meyer had lobbied for his team to get into the BCS National Championship game over Michigan during the 2006 season. Ultimately, Meyer's lobbying was successful and Florida went on to defeat Michigan's hated rivals Ohio State, 41–14, in the BCS National Championship Game. Previously, Michigan and Florida met four years earlier in the 2003 Outback Bowl, with Michigan defeating Florida, 38–30. Florida's loss makes them the second defending BCS Champion to lose a non-BCS bowl game a year later, the first being Florida's SEC rivals the LSU Tigers in the 2005 edition of this bowl game against the Iowa Hawkeyes.

== Game summary ==
Michigan started the game at their own 6-yard line and put together a 94-yard opening drive. Michigan quarterback Chad Henne connected on a 21-yard pass to Mario Manningham to put Michigan up 7–0. Over the course of the game, Michigan turned the ball over four times (two fumbles and two interceptions), which resulted in two Florida touchdown drives. These two touchdowns eventually put the Gators ahead 35–31 with just under six minutes to play. The Wolverines regained the lead when Adrian Arrington caught a touchdown pass to make the score 38–35 in favor of Michigan. Florida got the ball back but could not convert on fourth down from their own 25-yard line. Michigan ran three straight plays that resulted in a K.C. Lopata field goal to make the score 41–35 with 2:20 remaining. On Florida's last possession, quarterback Tim Tebow failed to complete a pass on four consecutive downs. After knocking down Tebow's final pass, Michigan ran out the clock to clinch the win, 41–35. Chad Henne was named the game's MVP.

== Scoring summary ==
Scoring summary

Quarter	Time	Drive			Team	Scoring information	Score	
Quarter	Time	Plays	Yards	TOP	Team	Scoring information	MICH	FLA
1	10:59	11	94	4:01	MICH	Mario Manningham 21-yard touchdown reception from Chad Henne, K. C. Lopata kick good	7	0
1	2:37	7	59	3:04	FLA	Percy Harvin 10-yard touchdown reception from Tim Tebow, Joey Ijjas kick good	7	7
2	14:48	3	29	0:56	FLA	Andre Caldwell 18-yard touchdown reception from Tim Tebow, Joey Ijjas kick good	7	14
2	9:51	12	56	4:57	MICH	Mike Hart 3-yard touchdown run, K. C. Lopata kick good	14	14
2	0:08	11	62	2:31	MICH	Adrian Arrington 1-yard touchdown reception from Chad Henne, K. C. Lopata kick good	21	14
3	12:50	7	37	2:10	MICH	Mike Hart 1-yard touchdown run, K. C. Lopata kick good	28	14
3	7:55	10	56	4:55	FLA	Tim Tebow 1-yard touchdown run, Joey Ijjas kick good	28	21
3	1:26	8	80	3:11	FLA	Andre Caldwell 14-yard touchdown reception from Tim Tebow, Joey Ijjas kick good	28	28
4	12:16	10	50	4:10	MICH	37-yard field goal by K. C. Lopata	31	28
4	5:49	5	34	2:30	FLA	Percy Harvin 10-yard touchdown run, Joey Ijjas kick good	31	35
4	4:12	4	67	1:37	MICH	Adrian Arrington 18-yard touchdown reception from Chad Henne, K. C. Lopata kick good	38	35
4	2:21	4	0	0:21	MICH	41-yard field goal by K. C. Lopata	41	35
"TOP" = time of possession. For other American football terms, see Glossary of American football.							41	35

== Game statistics ==
Team statistics
	Michigan	Florida
1st downs	28	28
Total yards	524	399
Passing yards	373	169
Rushing yards	151	230
Penalties	8-65	9-49
3rd down conversions	10-15	2-11
4th down conversions	0-0	2-4
Turnovers	4	0
Time of Possession	32:18	27:42

=== Individual statistics ===
Michigan passing
	C/ATT^{*}	Yds	TD	INT
Chad Henne	25/39	373	3	2
Michigan rushing
	Car^{a}	Yds	TD	LG^{b}
Mike Hart	32	129	2	23
Mario Manningham	7	53	0	23
Brandon Minor	1	-2	0	0
Team	3	-5	0	0
Chad Henne	4	24	0	0
Michigan receiving
	Rec^{c}	Yds	TD	LG^{b}
Adrian Arrington	9	153	2	37
Mario Manningham	5	78	1	24
Carson Butler	1	65	0	65
Greg Mathews	7	62	0	18
Mike Hart	1	7	0	7
Junior Hemingway	1	4	0	4
Mark Moundros	1	4	0	4

^{*} Completions/Attempts ^{a} Carries ^{b} Long play ^{c} Receptions

Florida passing
	C/ATT^{*}	Yds	TD	INT
Tim Tebow	17/33	154	3	0
Chas Henry	1/1	15	0	0
Florida rushing
	Car^{a}	Yds	TD	LG^{b}
Percy Harvin	13	165	1	66
Tim Tebow	16	57	1	19
Kestahn Moore	2	9	0	7
Team	1	-1	0	0
Florida receiving
	Rec^{c}	Yds	TD	LG^{b}
Percy Harvin	9	77	1	20
Andre Caldwell	2	40	2	18
Aaron Hernandez	3	31	0	15
Cornelius Ingram	1	17	0	17
Louis Murphy	1	4	0	4

^{*} Completions/Attempts ^{a} Carries ^{b} Long play ^{c} Receptions
