= Jamar Adams =

American football player (born 1985)

No. 36, 25, 45
- Position: Safety

Personal information
- Born: November 29, 1985 (age 40); Charlotte, North Carolina, U.S.
- Listed height: 6 ft 2 in (1.88 m)
- Listed weight: 215 lb (98 kg)

Career information
- High school: David W. Butler (Matthews, North Carolina)
- College: Michigan
- NFL draft: 2008: undrafted

Career history
- Seattle Seahawks (2008–2009); Philadelphia Eagles (2010)

Awards and highlights
- 2× Second-team All-Big Ten (2006, 2007)

Career NFL statistics
- Total tackles: 7
- Pass deflections: 1
- Stats at Pro Football Reference

Jamar Dontarius Adams (born November 29, 1985) is an American former professional football player who was a safety in the National Football League (NFL). He played college football for the Michigan Wolverines and was signed by the Seattle Seahawks as an undrafted free agent in 2008. Adams also played for the Philadelphia Eagles.

== Early life ==
Adams attended David W. Butler High School in Matthews, North Carolina, where he recorded 225 tackles, 23 interceptions, 3 sacks, 6 forced fumbles, 2 fumble recoveries, and 1 blocked field goal in his four-year career as a safety and cornerback. Adams graduated in 2004, and was a highly touted prospect who was recruited by many prestigious universities. Adams was ranked as a three-star prospect and the 18th best safety in the class of 2004 according to Rivals.com.

== College career ==
Adams attended the University of Michigan from 2004 to 2008. Adams played in nine games as a true freshman in 2004 at Michigan. He recorded six tackles (five solo), while playing mostly on special teams and occasionally as a reserve defensive back. As a sophomore in 2005, Adams started 8 games including the final six, and he compiled 27 tackles (20 solo) with one tackle for a loss and two pass breakups.

As a Junior in 2006, Adams made 47 tackles (39 solo), one sack, three tackles for loss, and one forced fumble. He recorded one interception and deflected seven other passes, earning him All-Big Ten Conference second-team recognition as a Junior.

In Adams' senior season, he once again earned second-team All-Big Ten accolades and helped Michigan win the 2008 Capitol One Bowl. Adams started all 13 games at strong safety and led the team with a career-high 92 tackles (39 solo), the second-highest total by a Big Ten defensive back in 2007. He added one sack with 2.5 tackles for loss, and he deflected 13 passes while also registering 3 interceptions.

In his career, Adams played in 47 games (starting in 34), made 172 tackles (103 solo), two sacks, 6.5 tackles-for-loss, one forced fumble, 22 passes broken up, and four interceptions for 58 yards.

== Professional career ==
Pre-draft measurables
Height	Weight	Arm length	Hand span	40-yard dash	10-yard split	20-yard split	20-yard shuttle	Three-cone drill	Vertical jump	Broad jump
6 ft 2 in (1.88 m)	212 lb (96 kg)	33 3/4 in (0.86 m)	9 3/8 in (0.24 m)	4.62 s	1.56 s	2.67 s	4.49 s	6.90 s	34.0 in (0.86 m)	10 ft 1 in (3.07 m)
All values from NFL Combine

=== Seattle Seahawks ===
Adams was signed as an undrafted free agent by the Seattle Seahawks on April 27, 2008, even though many draft analysts predicted that he would be picked as high as the 3rd round. He played well enough in the preseason to earn a spot on Seattle's practice squad. Adams spent the majority of his rookie season on the Seahawks' practice squad, but did play in one game, marking his NFL debut, on November 16 against the Arizona Cardinals. Adams did not record any statistics playing on special teams against the Cardinals.

After being waived on September 5, 2009, Adams was re-signed to the practice squad. He was signed off the practice squad on November 3, making his season debut against the Minnesota Vikings on November 22, 2009. Excluding the St. Louis Rams game on November 29, 2009, Adams played in all remaining regular season games for the Seahawks, registering four tackles on limited special teams play.

=== Philadelphia Eagles ===
Adams was signed to the Philadelphia Eagles' practice squad on September 22, 2010. He was released on September 30. He was re-signed to the team's practice squad on December 21. He was promoted to the active roster on December 31. He was waived during final roster cuts on September 3, 2011.
