= Adrian Arrington =

American football player and coach (born 1985)

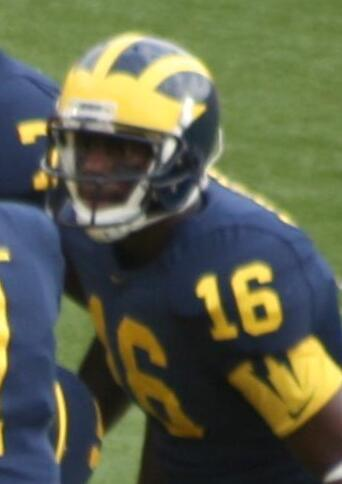
- Arrington with the Michigan Wolverines in 2006

No. 87
- Position: Wide receiver

Personal information
- Born: November 7, 1985 (age 40); Cedar Rapids, Iowa, U.S.
- Listed height: 6 ft 3 in (1.91 m)
- Listed weight: 192 lb (87 kg)

Career information
- High school: Washington (Cedar Rapids, Iowa)
- College: Michigan
- NFL draft: 2008: 7th round, 237th overall pick

Career history

Playing
- New Orleans Saints (2008–2012)

Coaching
- Cedar Rapids Titans (2017–?) Offensive coordinator

Awards and highlights
- Super Bowl champion (XLIV)

Career NFL statistics
- Receptions: 9
- Receiving yards: 110
- Stats at Pro Football Reference

Adrian Jarrard Arrington (born November 7, 1985) is an American former professional football player who was a wide receiver in the National Football League (NFL). He played college football for the Michigan Wolverines and was selected by the New Orleans Saints in the seventh round of the 2008 NFL draft. Arrington was called up from the team's practice squad before week 17 of the 2010 season. Arrington served as the offensive coordinator for the Cedar Rapids Titans of the Indoor Football League (IFL).

== Early life ==
Arrington went to high school at Washington High School in Cedar Rapids, Iowa. In his high school career Arrington made 100 receptions for 1,547 yards and 23 touchdowns; returned 24 kickoffs for 642 yards and a touchdown and 38 punt returns for 442 yards and a touchdown; and also had 11 career interceptions and 95 career tackles on defense. Arrington played in the 2004 U.S. Army All-American Bowl, and was named the Gatorade player of the year for Iowa as a senior.

== College career ==
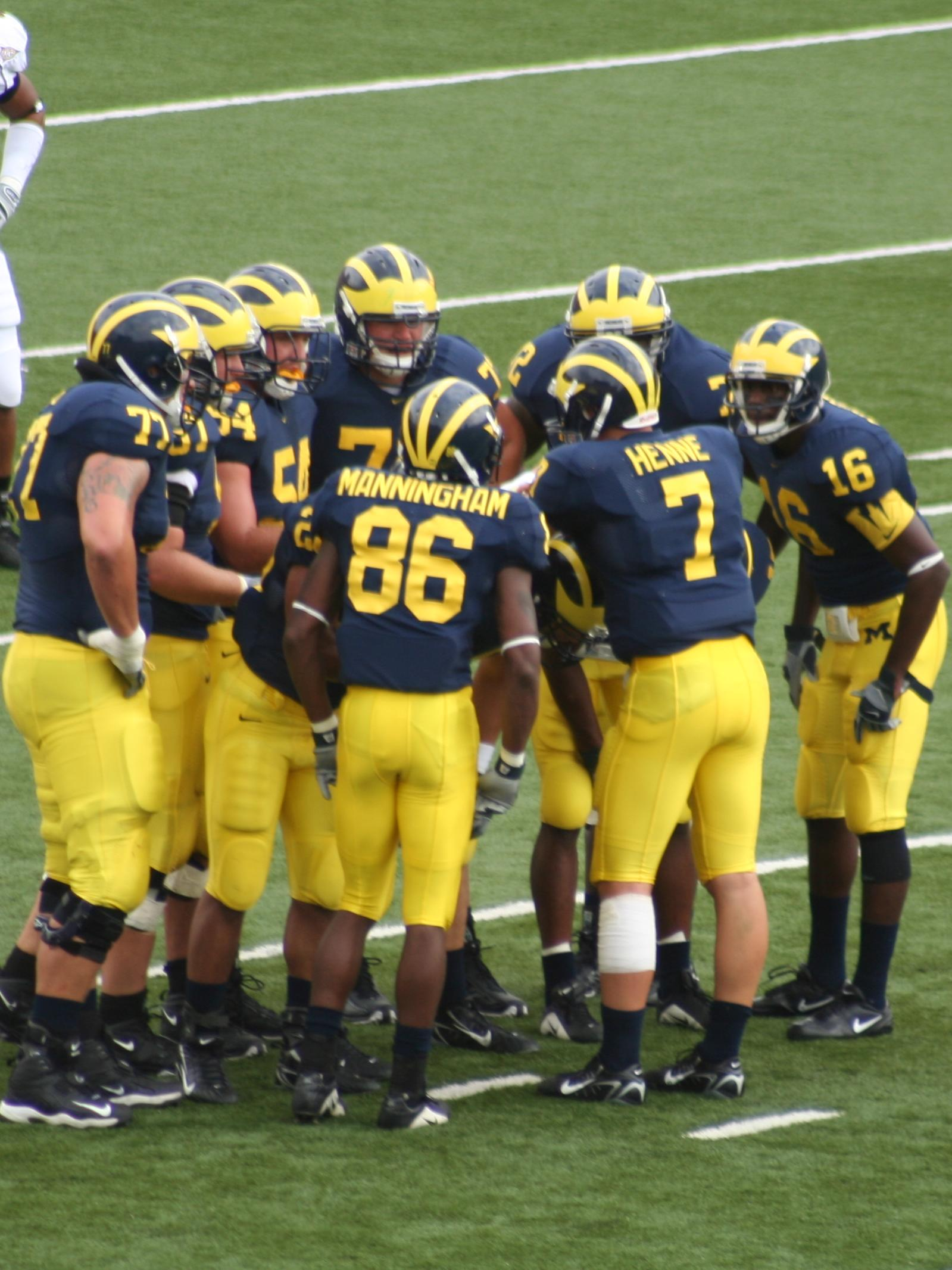
Arrington (#16) in 2006

In 2004, Arrington's freshman season, he caught two passes for 12 yards in eight games. In 2005, Arrington's sophomore season, he played in one game, then was injured and played in no further games, allowing him to redshirt for the season and gain an additional year of college football eligibility in 2008. As a junior in 2006, Arrington played in all 13 games and started five at wide receiver. He finished second on the team in receptions with 40, second in touchdowns with eight, and third in receiving yards with 544. He also made four catches for 34 yards against USC in the 2007 Rose Bowl, one of them for a touchdown.

As a senior in 2007, Arrington made 58 catches for 729 yards and six touchdowns, finishing second to Mario Manningham on the team in all three receiving categories. In his last game as a Wolverine, Arrington had nine receptions for 153 yards and two touchdowns aiding Michigan to a victory over heavily favored Florida in the 2008 Capital One Bowl.

After the 2007 season, Arrington opted to forgo his eligibility for the 2008 season and entered the 2008 NFL draft.

== Professional career ==
Pre-draft measurables
Height	Weight	Arm length	Hand span	40-yard dash	10-yard split	20-yard split	Vertical jump
6 ft 2 7/8 in (1.90 m)	203 lb (92 kg)	32 1/2 in (0.83 m)	9 1/2 in (0.24 m)	4.55 s	1.53 s	2.64 s	36.0 in (0.91 m)
All values from NFL Combine/Pro Day

Arrington was selected by the New Orleans Saints with the 237th overall pick in the 2008 NFL draft. The Saints traded a 2009 sixth-round pick to draft Arrington. On July 18, 2008, the Saints signed him to a contract, with terms undisclosed. On August 29, Arrington was placed on injured reserve for the 2008 season due to a toe injury during the first preseason game.

Arrington spent the 2009 regular season on the Saints' practice squad, but on January 20, 2010, he was moved to the active roster prior to the NFC Championship Game, due to concerns about Robert Meachem's ankle injury, but did not play. He was waived on September 29, but re-signed to the practice squad. Arrington was moved to the active roster on December 29.

In 2012, Arrington had off-season surgery on his meniscus and was unable to participate in any preseason games. Despite his injury, he made the regular season roster. On September 8, the day before the season opener, Arrington was cut, but he was re-added to the roster on the September 10. He was then placed on injured reserve before being released with an injury settlement the following week.

== See also ==
- Lists of Michigan Wolverines football receiving leaders
