= Adam Kraus =

American football player (born 1984)

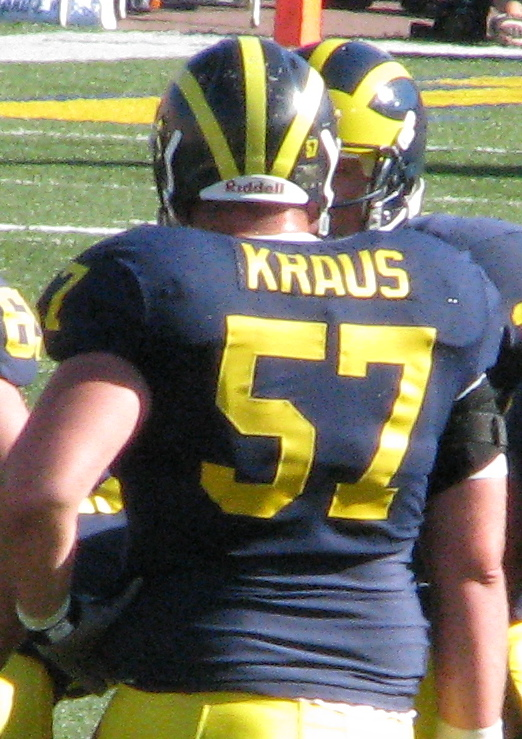

Profile
- Position: Offensive guard

Personal information
- Born: September 10, 1984 (age 42); New Orleans, Louisiana, U.S.
- Listed height: 6 ft 6 in (1.98 m)
- Listed weight: 296 lb (134 kg)

Career information
- High school: Brother Martin (New Orleans)
- College: Michigan
- NFL draft: 2008: undrafted

Career history
- Baltimore Ravens (2008)*
- * Offseason or practice squad member only

Awards and highlights
- 2× First-team All-Big Ten (2006, 2007)

Adam Michael Kraus (born September 10, 1984) is an American former college football player who was an offensive guard for the Michigan Wolverines. He was a four-year letterman who appeared in 39 career games, making 35 starts along the offensive line. Kraus started 26 straight games to finish his career, 21 at left guard and the final five contests at center. He is a two-time All-Big Ten first-team selection in 2006 and 2007. His family relocated to Ann Arbor in 2005 after the family home in New Orleans was damaged in Hurricane Katrina. Kraus was signed by the Baltimore Ravens as a rookie free agent on May 9, 2008, and released on August 30, 2008.
