= 2008 Michigan Wolverines football team =

American college football season

2008 Michigan Wolverines football
- Conference: Big Ten Conference
- Record: 3–9 (2–6 Big Ten)
- Head coach: Rich Rodriguez (1st season)
- Offensive coordinator: Calvin Magee (1st season)
- Offensive scheme: Spread option
- Defensive coordinator: Scott Shafer (1st season)
- Base defense: Multiple
- MVP: Brandon Graham
- Captains: Mike Massey; Tim Jamison; Will Johnson; Terrance Taylor
- Home stadium: Michigan Stadium

2008 Big Ten Conference football standings
	Conf.			Overall
Team	W		L	W		L
No. 8 Penn State $+	7	–	1	11	–	2
No. 9 Ohio State %+	7	–	1	10	–	3
No. 24 Michigan State	6	–	2	9	–	4
Northwestern	5	–	3	9	–	4
No. 20 Iowa	5	–	3	9	–	4
Wisconsin	3	–	5	7	–	6
Minnesota	3	–	5	7	–	6
Illinois	3	–	5	5	–	7
Purdue	2	–	6	4	–	8
Michigan	2	–	6	3	–	9
Indiana	1	–	7	3	–	9
$ – BCS representative as conference champion; % – BCS at-large representative; + – Conference co-champions; Rankings from AP Poll

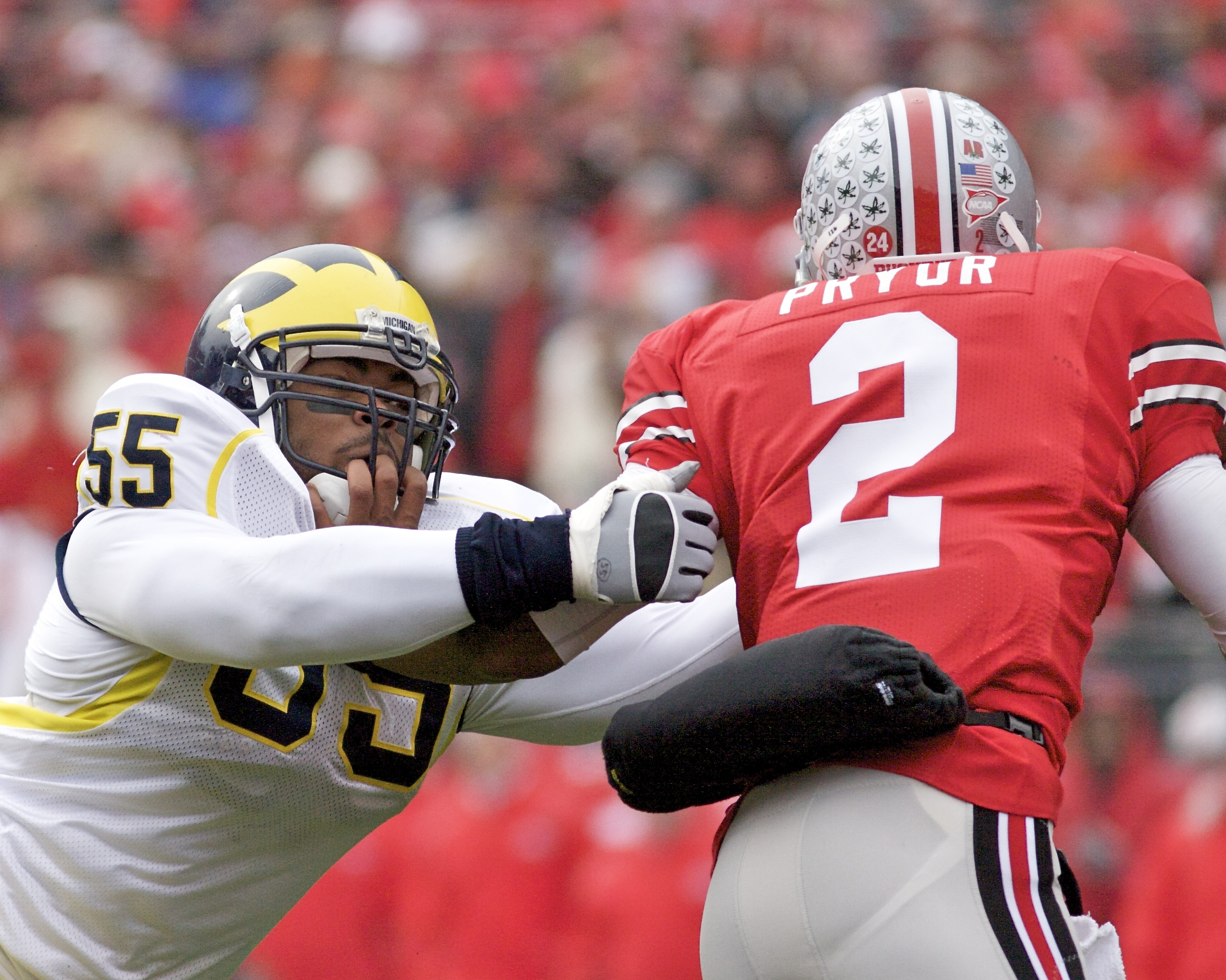
Brandon Graham tackles Terrelle Pryor during 2008 Michigan – Ohio State rivalry game.

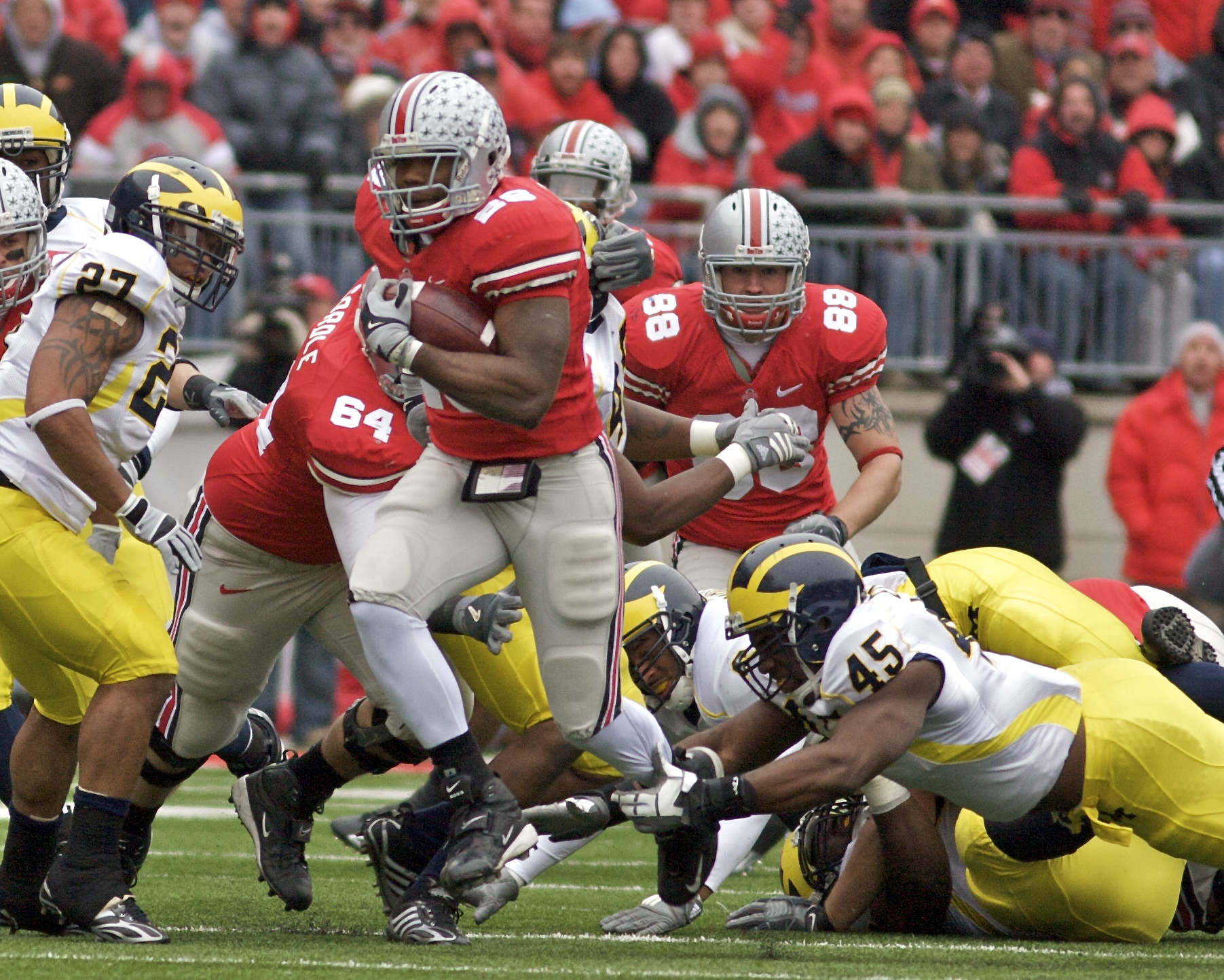
Obi Ezeh attempts shoestring tackle on Beanie Wells during 2008 Michigan – Ohio State rivalry game.

The 2008 Michigan Wolverines football team represented the University of Michigan in the 2008 NCAA Division I FBS football season. The team's head football coach was Rich Rodriguez. The Wolverines played their home games at Michigan Stadium in Ann Arbor, Michigan. The 2008 season marked Rodriguez's first season as Michigan head coach, having replaced longtime head coach Lloyd Carr following Carr's retirement at the end of the 2007 season. Rodriguez installed a spread option offense, a marked departure from Michigan's prior offensive approaches.

Rodriguez's first season was one of adjustment, with Michigan suffering its first losing season since 1967, and more losses (9) in a single season than in any other in the program's 129-year history. The losses included a 13–10 defeat to a Toledo team that posted a 3–9 record that season; this was Michigan's first-ever loss to a team from the Mid-American Conference. In addition, Michigan's loss to Ohio State on November 22 was the fifth straight, the most consecutive losses by Michigan to the Buckeyes up until that point.

== Schedule ==
Date	Time	Opponent	Site	TV	Result	Attendance	Source
August 30	3:30 p.m.	Utah*	Michigan Stadium; Ann Arbor, MI	ABC, ESPN2	L 23–25	108,421	
September 6	12:00 p.m.	Miami (OH)*	Michigan Stadium; Ann Arbor, MI	ESPN2	W 16–6	106,724	
September 13	3:30 p.m.	at Notre Dame*	Notre Dame Stadium; Notre Dame, IN (rivalry)	NBC	L 17–35	80,795	
September 27	3:30 p.m.	No. 9 Wisconsin	Michigan Stadium; Ann Arbor, MI	ABC, ESPN2	W 27–25	109,833	
October 4	3:30 p.m.	Illinois^{†}	Michigan Stadium; Ann Arbor, MI (rivalry)	ABC, ESPN2	L 20–45	109,750	
October 11	12:00 p.m.	Toledo*	Michigan Stadium; Ann Arbor, MI	BTN	L 10–13	107,267	
October 18	4:30 p.m.	at No. 3 Penn State	Beaver Stadium; University Park, PA (rivalry)	ESPN	L 17–46	110,017	
October 25	3:30 p.m.	Michigan State	Michigan Stadium; Ann Arbor, MI (rivalry)	ABC, ESPN2	L 21–35	110,146	
November 1	12:00 p.m.	at Purdue	Ross–Ade Stadium; West Lafayette, IN	BTN	L 42–48	59,135	
November 8	12:00 p.m.	at Minnesota	Hubert H. Humphrey Metrodome; Minneapolis, MN (Little Brown Jug)	ESPN	W 29–6	55,040	
November 15	12:00 p.m.	Northwestern	Michigan Stadium; Ann Arbor, MI (rivalry)	ESPN2	L 14–21	107,856	
November 22	12:00 p.m.	at No. 10 Ohio State	Ohio Stadium; Columbus, OH (rivalry)	ABC	L 7–42	105,564	
*Non-conference game; ^{†}Homecoming; Rankings from AP Poll released prior to the game; All times are in Eastern time

== Rankings ==
Ranking movements Legend: ██ Increase in ranking ██ Decrease in ranking — = Not ranked
	Week															
Poll	Pre	1	2	3	4	5	6	7	8	9	10	11	12	13	14	Final
AP	—	—	—	—	—	—	—	—	—	—	—	—	—	—	—	—
Coaches	24	—	—	—	—	—	—	—	—	—	—	—	—	—	—	—
Harris	Not released				—	—	—	—	—	—	—	—	—	—	—	Not released
BCS	Not released							—	—	—	—	—	—	—	—	Not released

== Game summaries ==
=== Utah ===
Utah at Michigan

Team	1	2	3	4	Total
• Utes	6	16	3	0	25
Wolverines	10	0	0	13	23

- Date: August 30
- Location: Michigan Stadium
  Ann Arbor, Michigan
- Game start: 3:30 p.m. EST
- Elapsed time: 3:33
- Game attendance: 108,421
- Game weather: 85 °F (29 °C), Sunny, SW 5 mph (8.0 km/h)
- Referee: Todd Geerlings
- TV announcers (ABC/ESPN2): Terry Gannon (Play-by-play), David Norrie (Color) & Jeannine Edwards (Sideline)

In the season opener in Ann Arbor and Rich Rodriguez's first game as head coach, the Wolverines took on the Utah Utes. The Wolverines scored first with just over 11 minutes to go in the first, when Nick Sheridan threw an 8-yard TD pass to Michael Shaw. Utah struck back a few minutes later when Courbin Louks ran in a TD from 8 yards out. The Wolverines blocked the PAT though. Then with just over 5 minutes to go in the first, K.C. Lopata completed a 50-yard field goal. Utah's Louie Sakoda completed 3 field goals in the second quarter, from 28, 43 and 41 yards out, respectively. Then a few seconds before halftime, Utah's Brian Johnson completed a 19-yard TD pass to Bradon Godfrey. Midway through the third quarter, Louie Sakoda of Utah completed his fourth field goal of the day, this one from 53 yards out. Midway through the fourth, Steven Threet completed a 33-yard touchdown pass to Junior Hemingway. A few minutes later, Sam McGuffie ran in a TD from 3 yards out. The Wolverines attempted a 2-point conversion to tie the game but failed. Utah's defense held off the Wolverines for the remainder of the game.

Statistics	UTAH	MICH
First downs	16	11
Total yards	341	203
Rushing yards	36	36
Passing yards	344	174
Turnovers	3	3
Time of possession	35:54	24:06

Team	Category	Player	Statistics
Utah	Passing	Brian Johnson	21/33, 305 yards, TD, INT
Utah	Rushing	Matt Asiata	13 rushes, 77 yards
Utah	Receiving	Bradon Godfrey	7 receptions, 84 yards, TD
Michigan	Passing	Nick Sheridan	11/19, 98 yards, TD, INT
Michigan	Rushing	Brandon Minor	4 rushes, 21 yards
Michigan	Receiving	Greg Mathews	3 receptions, 54 yards

=== Miami (OH) ===
Miami (OH) at Michigan

Team	1	2	3	4	Total
RedHawks	0	3	3	0	6
• Wolverines	10	0	0	6	16

- Date: September 6
- Location: Michigan Stadium
  Ann Arbor, Michigan
- Game start: 12:00 p.m. EST
- Elapsed time: 2:59
- Game attendance: 106,724
- Game weather: 75 °F (24 °C), Partly Cloudy, N 5 mph (8.0 km/h)
- Referee: Dan Capron
- TV announcers (ESPN2): Dave Pasch (play-by-play) & Andre Ware (color)

Coming off their loss to Utah, the Wolverines stayed home to play the Miami RedHawks. The Wolverines had never lost to the Redhawks in the four games the teams had played in previous seasons. The Wolverines got on the board first with just under 11 minutes to in the first quarter when QB Steven Threet ran in the ball himself from 9 yards out for a touchdown. Then with just under 9 minutes to go in the first, the Wolverines got on the board again with a 47-yard field goal by K.C. Lopata. The RedHawks finally scored late in the half with a 27-yard field goal by Nathan Parseghian. With that the 2 teams retired to the locker rooms.

The RedHawks scored next, on a 23-yard field goal by Nathan Parseghian with just under 7 minutes to go in the third. Then midway through the final quarter, the Wolverines capped off their victory when Brandon Minor ran in a TD from 15 yards out. However, the point after attempt by K.C. Lopata failed. It was Rich Rodriguez's first win as Michigan's head coach and the Wolverines' first win of the season. The win made their all-time record against the RedHawks 5–0.

Statistics	MOH	MICH
First downs	16	15
Total yards	252	281
Rushing yards	47	178
Passing yards	235	103
Turnovers	1	0
Time of possession	35:13	24:47

Team	Category	Player	Statistics
Miami (OH)	Passing	Daniel Raudabaugh	20/33, 191 yards
Miami (OH)	Rushing	Thomas Merriweather	21 rushes, 77 yards
Miami (OH)	Receiving	Jamal Rogers	9 receptions, 78 yards
Michigan	Passing	Steven Threet	6/13, 63 yards
Michigan	Rushing	Sam McGuffie	17 rushes, 74 yards
Michigan	Receiving	Martavious Odoms	3 receptions, 57 yards

=== At Notre Dame ===
Michigan at Notre Dame

Team	1	2	3	4	Total
Wolverines	7	10	0	0	17
• Fighting Irish	21	7	0	7	35

- Date: September 13
- Location: Notre Dame Stadium
  Notre Dame, Indiana
- Game start: 3:30 p.m. EST
- Elapsed time: 3:03
- Game attendance: 80,795
- Game weather: 83 °F (28 °C), Showers and Thunderstorms, SW 15 mph (24 km/h)
- Referee: John McDaid
- TV announcers (NBC): Tom Hammond (Play-by-play), Pat Haden (Color) & Alex Flanagan (Sideline)

After their win over Miami, the Wolverines flew to South Bend, Indiana to take on the Notre Dame Fighting Irish for their first road game of the season, renewing the longtime rivalry between the two teams. In the pouring rain, the Wolverines gave up the ball on 4 fumbles. They also threw 2 interceptions. The Fighting Irish got the first scores of the game with just under 12 minutes left in the first quarter, when Robert Hughes 2 ran in a touchdown from 2 yards out. Less than a minute later, QB Jimmy Clausen completed a 10-yard pass to Duval Kamara that was run in for another TD. A few minutes later Jimmy Clausen threw another TD pass, this time a 48 yard long bomb to Golden Tate. The Wolverines got on the board late in the first quarter with their own long bomb, a 40-yard TD Steven Threet pass to Sam McGuffie. Then with just under 12 minutes to go in the second quarter, the Wolverines got on the board again with a 23-yard K.C. Lopata field goal. A few minutes later, the Fighting Irish's Robert Hughes ran in a touchdown from 1 yard out. Then with just under 6 minutes in the half, the Wolverines struck back when Kevin Grady ran in a touchdown from 7 yards out. With that the teams went into their locker rooms to dry out temporarily. Both teams went scoreless in the third quarter. But the Fighting Irish capped off their scoring when the Wolverines fumbled the ball and Brian Smith picked it up and ran it back 35 yards for a touchdown.

Statistics	MICH	ND
First downs	22	13
Total yards	388	260
Rushing yards	159	113
Passing yards	229	147
Turnovers	6	2
Time of possession	27:48	32:12

Team	Category	Player	Statistics
Michigan	Passing	Steven Threet	16/23, 175 yards, TD
Michigan	Rushing	Sam McGuffie	25 rushes, 131 yards
Michigan	Receiving	Martavious Odoms	6 receptions, 56 yards
Notre Dame	Passing	Jimmy Clausen	10/21, 147 yards, 2 TD, 2 INT
Notre Dame	Rushing	Robert Hughes	19 rushes, 79 yards, 2 TD
Notre Dame	Receiving	Golden Tate	4 receptions, 127 yards, TD

=== No. 9 Wisconsin ===
Wisconsin at Michigan

Team	1	2	3	4	Total
No. 9 Badgers	6	13	0	6	25
• Wolverines	0	0	7	20	27

- Date: September 27
- Location: Michigan Stadium
  Ann Arbor, Michigan
- Game start: 3:30 p.m. EST
- Elapsed time: 3:30
- Game attendance: 109,833
- Game weather: 75 °F (24 °C), Partly Cloudy, NE 7 mph (11 km/h)
- Referee: Dennis Lipski
- TV announcers (ABC/ESPN2): Brad Nessler (Play-by-play), Bob Griese (Color), Paul Maguire & Stacey Dales (Sideline)

Following a bye week, the Wolverines played the 500th game in the Big House against the #9 Wisconsin Badgers in their first contest against another Big Ten Conference school of the season. The Badgers missed a field goal in the first quarter but later scored on two field goal attempts. Scoring one touchdown and two field goals in the second quarter, Wisconsin finished the half with a 19–0 lead. The Wolverines gave up 5 fumbles, threw 2 interceptions and managed only 21 yards in the first half. The offense got going midway through the third quarter. A touchdown pass thrown to freshman Kevin Koger got them on the board. The Wolverines continued to have success offensively, scoring 3 touchdowns in the fourth quarter. They took the lead when John Thompson returned an interception for a touchdown. The Badgers were down 27–19 with a little over 5 minutes to go. Because of a series of big passes, the Badgers scored a touchdown and went for the two-point conversion. Their initial attempt resulted in a pass caught for an apparent score, but was thwarted by an ineligible receiver penalty. On their second attempt, the ball sailed over the head of the intended target in the back of the endzone. The Badgers were unable to regain possession with an onside kick, ending the game. Their 20-point comeback was the second largest comeback in Michigan football history (the largest was a 21-point comeback victory at Minnesota in 2003).

Statistics	WIS	MICH
First downs	18	14
Total yards	384	268
Rushing yards	158	172
Passing yards	246	96
Turnovers	6	3
Time of possession	36:04	23:56

Team	Category	Player	Statistics
Wisconsin	Passing	Allan Evridge	20/37, 226 yards, TD, 2 INT
Wisconsin	Rushing	P. J. Hill	22 rushes, 70 yards
Wisconsin	Receiving	David Gilreath	5 receptions, 65 yards, TD
Michigan	Passing	Steven Threet	12/31, 96 yards, TD, 2 INT
Michigan	Rushing	Steven Threet	9 rushes, 89 yards
Michigan	Receiving	Greg Mathews	4 receptions, 48 yards

=== Illinois ===
Illinois at Michigan

Team	1	2	3	4	Total
• Fighting Illini	3	14	7	21	45
Wolverines	14	0	0	6	20

- Date: October 4
- Location: Michigan Stadium
  Ann Arbor, Michigan
- Game start: 3:30 p.m. EST
- Elapsed time: 3:30
- Game attendance: 109,750
- Game weather: 62 °F (17 °C), Mostly Sunny, W 7 mph (11 km/h)
- Referee: Dave Witvoet
- TV announcers (ABC/ESPN2): Dave LaMont (Play-by-play), David Norrie (Color) & Jeannine Edwards (Sideline)

For their 2008 Homecoming Game, the Wolverines hosted the Illinois Fighting Illini. The Wolverines dominated the first quarter, scoring a season high 14 points on 2 touchdowns. Michigan's Steven Threet was 18-of-35 for 250 yards and two TDs. Sam McGuffie ran for 70 yards and a touchdown and freshman Martavious Odoms set season highs with seven receptions and 129 yards receiving. However, they were blanked in the second and third quarter. They came back to life in the fourth quarter though, when Mark Moundros caught a 2-yard pass for a touchdown, but kicker K.C. Lopata failed on the PAT attempt. Illinois however had their best game against Michigan in the history of the Michigan / Illinois contests. The Illini set a school record for points against Michigan (45), surpassing the 39 points Red Grange helped them score in 1924 as Memorial Stadium was dedicated, and they scored the most any team has at Michigan Stadium since Florida State had 51 in 1991. It was also the Illini's first victory at the Big House since 1999, and University of Illinois quarterback Isiah "Juice" Williams set a Big House record with 431 all-purpose yards, breaking the record previously held by former Illini quarterback Tony Eason (403). Illini quarterback Isiah "Juice" Williams connected with Jeff Cumberland for a 77-yard pass, the longest by an Illini quarterback since 1985, and a perfectly lofted screen to running back Daniel Dufrene turned into a 57-yard TD. With the loss, the Wolverines fell to 2–3 on the season and 1–1 in the Big Ten, their worst record after five games since starting 1–4 in 1967, two years before Bo Schembechler arrived.

Statistics	ILL	MICH
First downs	19	17
Total yards	501	319
Rushing yards	191	69
Passing yards	310	283
Turnovers	0	2
Time of possession	33:06	26:54

Team	Category	Player	Statistics
Illinois	Passing	Juice Williams	13/26, 310 yards, 2 TD
Illinois	Rushing	Juice Williams	19 rushes, 121 yards, 2 TD
Illinois	Receiving	Arrelious Benn	6 receptions, 122 yards
Michigan	Passing	Steven Threet	18/35, 250 yards, 2 TD
Michigan	Rushing	Sam McGuffie	19 rushes, 70 yards, TD
Michigan	Receiving	Martavious Odoms	7 receptions, 129 yards

=== Toledo ===
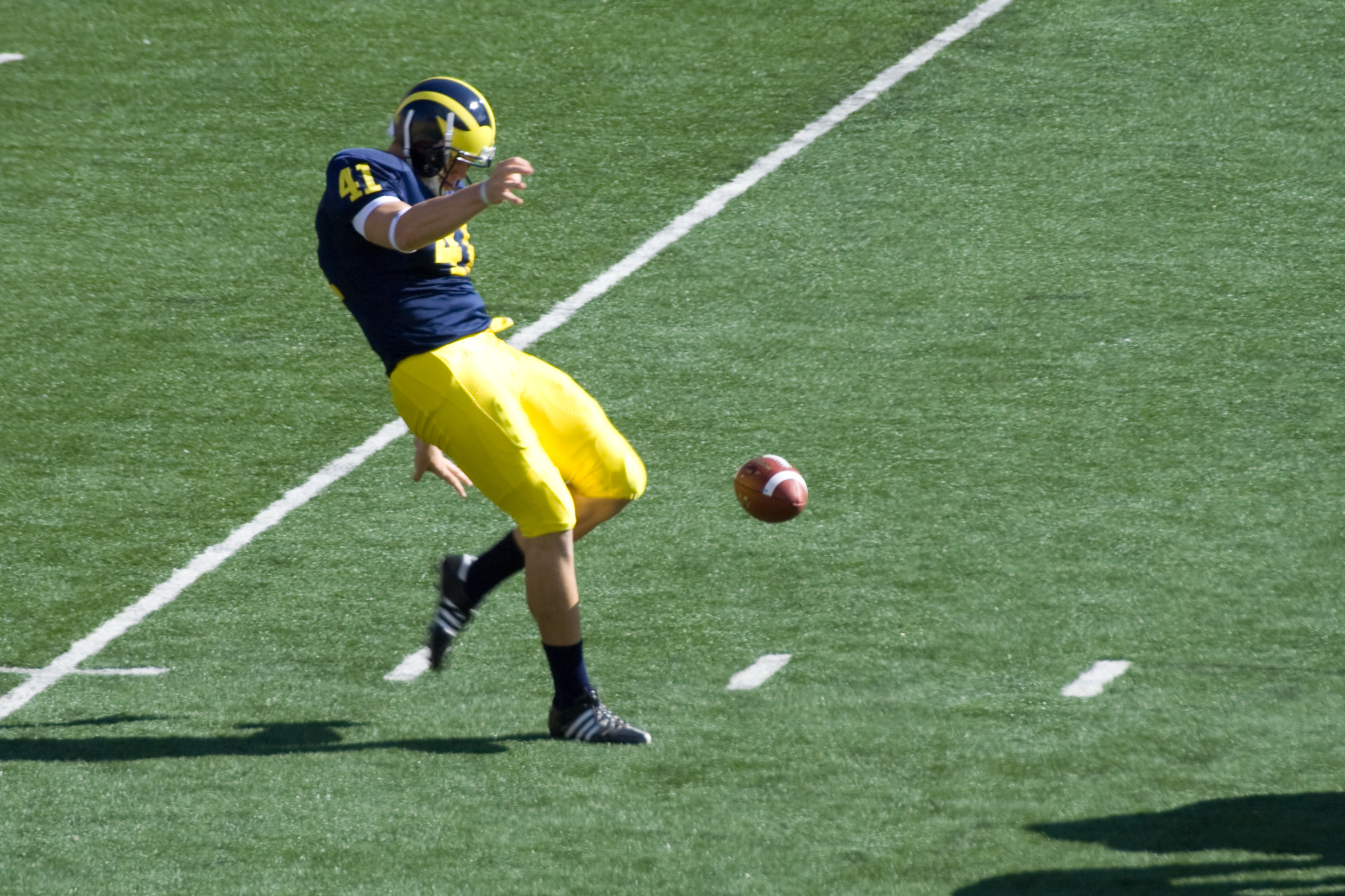
Zoltan Mesko punting

Toledo at Michigan

Team	1	2	3	4	Total
• Rockets	7	0	3	3	13
Wolverines	7	3	0	0	10

- Date: October 11
- Location: Michigan Stadium
  Ann Arbor, Michigan
- Game start: 12:00 p.m. EST
- Elapsed time: 3:18
- Game attendance: 107,267
- Game weather: 70 °F (21 °C), Sunny, Wind: Calm
- Referee: Todd Geerlings
- TV announcers (BTN): Thom Brennaman (Play-by-play), Charles Davis (Color) & Charissa Thompson (Sideline)

After their huge loss to Illinois, the Wolverines hosted the Toledo Rockets. It was the first time the two teams had ever played. In the first quarter, the Rockets scored first when a pass from Michigan QB Steven Threet was intercepted in the end zone by Tyrrell Herbert and run back 101 yards for a touchdown. Later in the first quarter, the Wolverines got on the board with 27-yard TD pass from Steven Threet to Brandon Minor. The next score came on a 26-yard field goal by Michigan kicker K.C. Lopata midway through the second quarter. With that, the teams went into the locker rooms at the half with a score of 10–7. In the second half, the Rockets shut out the Wolverines and scored two more field goals, both by Alex Steigerwald. He completed a 29-yard attempt in the third quarter and a 48-yard attempt in the fourth quarter. With less than a minute remaining in the game, the Wolverines got into the red zone and attempted a field goal to take the game into overtime. Lopata missed the field goal though, sealing the victory for the Rockets and marking the first time the Wolverines had ever lost to a Mid-American Conference team. To make matters worse - this was not a good MAC team; Toledo ended up posting a 3–9 overall record, and was 2–6 in the MAC. In the game, Nick Moore of the Rockets set a record of 20 receptions against The Wolverines. With the humbling loss, the Wolverines fell to 2–4, their worst start in 41 years.

Statistics	TOL	MICH
First downs	17	19
Total yards	327	290
Rushing yards	70	170
Passing yards	265	126
Turnovers	1	3
Time of possession	33:08	26:52

Team	Category	Player	Statistics
Toledo	Passing	Aaron Opelt	33/50, 257 yards
Toledo	Rushing	DaJuane Collins	10 rushes, 65 yards
Toledo	Receiving	Nick Moore	20 receptions, 162 yards
Michigan	Passing	Nick Sheridan	8/16, 65 yards, 2 INT
Michigan	Rushing	Sam McGuffie	25 rushes, 105 yards
Michigan	Receiving	Sam McGuffie	5 receptions, 44 yards

=== At No. 3 Penn State ===
Michigan at Penn State

Team	1	2	3	4	Total
Wolverines	10	7	0	0	17
• No. 3 Nittany Lions	7	7	12	20	46

- Date: October 18
- Location: Beaver Stadium
  University Park, Pennsylvania
- Game start: 4:30 p.m. EST
- Elapsed time: 3:13
- Game attendance: 110,017
- Game weather: 46 °F (8 °C), Clear, E 6 mph (9.7 km/h)
- Referee: Bill LeMonnier
- TV announcers (ESPN): Sean McDonough (Play-by-play), Chris Spielman (Color) & Rob Stone (Sideline)

In the fourth-largest crowd in Beaver Stadium history, the Penn State Nittany Lions ended a nine-game losing streak to the Wolverines, dating back to 1997. Michigan tallied 204 yards of offense and scored on their first three possessions to take a 17–7 lead early in the second quarter, but the Nittany Lion defense made key halftime adjustments and limited the Wolverines to only 87 yards the remainder of the game. Penn State quarterback Daryll Clark's touchdown pass to Jordan Norwood late in the first half cut Michigan's lead to 17–14, Penn State's first deficit at halftime this season.

The Nittany Lions would outscore the Wolverines 32–0 in the second half for a 46–17 win. Clark finished 18 of 31 for 171 yards and a touchdown and also ran for 45 yards and two one-yard touchdowns but lost a fumble on State's second drive which led to a Wolverine field goal. Evan Royster ran for a career-high 174 yards on 18 carries for a 9.7 yard per carry average, including a 44-yard touchdown for Penn State's first points. Deon Butler had a season-high eight receptions for 105 yards, his fourth-career 100-yard game. Stephfon Green took a screen pass from Pat Devlin and outran the Wolverines defense 80 yards for the Nittany Lions' final score.

Linebacker NaVorro Bowman led the defense with 11 tackles. Defensive tackle Jared Odrick made a career-high six stops, with 2.5 tackles for loss, but his biggest play occurred with 4:39 remaining in the third quarter. Odrick sacked Michigan quarterback Nick Sheridan, who was in for the injured Steven Threet, in the end zone for a safety and Penn State's first lead of the game, 19–17. Aaron Maybin finished with four tackles, including a sack of Threet that forced a fumble, recovered by Abe Koroma, and led to a Penn State touchdown.

Statistics	MICH	PSU
First downs	15	22
Total yards	291	482
Rushing yards	202	231
Passing yards	106	251
Turnovers	2	1
Time of possession	30:19	29:41

Team	Category	Player	Statistics
Michigan	Passing	Steven Threet	9/13, 84 yards
Michigan	Rushing	Brandon Minor	23 rushes, 117 yards, TD
Michigan	Receiving	Martavious Odoms	3 receptions, 34 yards
Penn State	Passing	Daryll Clark	18/31, 171 yards, TD
Penn State	Rushing	Evan Royster	18 rushes, 174 yards, TD
Penn State	Receiving	Deon Butler	8 receptions, 105 yards

=== Michigan State ===
Michigan State at Michigan

Team	1	2	3	4	Total
• Spartans	7	7	7	14	35
Wolverines	7	7	7	0	21

- Date: October 25
- Location: Michigan Stadium
  Ann Arbor, Michigan
- Game start: 3:30 p.m. EST
- Elapsed time: 3:15
- Game attendance: 110,146
- Game weather: 52 °F (11 °C), Cloudy/Light Rain, SW 15 mph (24 km/h)
- Referee: Dave Witvoet
- TV announcers (ABC/ESPN2): Sean McDonough (Play-by-play), Chris Spielman (Color) & Rob Stone (Sideline)

After their blowout loss at Penn State, the Wolverines went back to Ann Arbor to take on their in-state rivals, the Michigan State Spartans, for the Paul Bunyan Trophy. The Spartans struck first, scoring on a huge 61-yard TD pass from Brian Hoyer to Blair White with just under 12 minutes to go in the first quarter. The Wolverines tied it up near the end of the first quarter when Brandon Minor scored on a 19-yard TD pass from Steven Threet. The Spartans took the lead back near the end of the half with a 64-yard TD run by Javon Ringer. The Wolverines tied it back up less than a minute later when Brandon Minor ran in a TD from 2 yards out.

Midway through the third quarter, the Wolverines took their only lead of the game when QB Steven Threet ran in a touchdown himself from 2 yards out. From there, Michigan State took control of the game. The Spartans tied it back up when Charlie Gantt scored on a 4-yard TD pass near the end of the third quarter. The Wolverines were shut out in the fourth quarter. The Spartans took the lead in the fourth quarter when Javon Ringer ran in another TD, this time from 3 yards out, and sealed their win when Josh Rouse scored on a 7-yard TD pass. With the loss, the Wolverines fell to 2–6 overall and 1–3 vs. Big Ten opponents.

Statistics	MSU	MICH
First downs	22	13
Total yards	473	252
Rushing yards	167	84
Passing yards	351	197
Turnovers	4	4
Time of possession	35:18	24:42

Team	Category	Player	Statistics
Michigan State	Passing	Brian Hoyer	17/29, 282 yards, 3 TD
Michigan State	Rushing	Javon Ringer	37 rushes, 194 yards, 2 TD
Michigan State	Receiving	Blair White	4 receptions, 143 yards, TD
Michigan	Passing	Steven Threet	13/27, 168 yards, TD, 3 INT
Michigan	Rushing	Brandon Minor	15 rushes, 55 yards, TD
Michigan	Receiving	Martavious Odoms	6 receptions, 42 yards

=== At Purdue ===
Michigan at Purdue

Team	1	2	3	4	Total
Wolverines	14	14	0	14	42
• Boilermakers	14	7	14	13	48

- Date: November 1
- Location: Ross–Ade Stadium
  West Lafayette, Indiana
- Game start: 12:00 p.m. EST
- Elapsed time: 3:22
- Game attendance: 59,135
- Game weather: 59 °F (15 °C), Partly Cloudy, WNW 4 mph (6.4 km/h)
- Referee: Dan Capron
- TV announcers (BTN): Wayne Larrivee (Play-by-play), Charles Davis (Color) & Charissa Thompson (Sideline)

In week 10, the Wolverines traveled to West Lafayette, Indiana to take on the Purdue Boilermakers. The Wolverines gained an early lead in the first quarter. First Brandon Minor ran in a TD from 45 yards out. A few minutes later Martavius Odoms got a huge score when he ran a punt back 73 yards for another TD, putting the Wolverines up 14–0. The Boilermakers quickly tied it up though with 2 TD's of their own later in the first quarter. First Kory Sheets ran in TD from 2 yards out. Then Justin Siller ran in a TD from 10 yards out. The Wolverines went up by 14 again in the second quarter though. First Laterryl Savoy scored on an 11-yard TD pass. Then the Wolverines got another big TD run, this time on a 51-yard rush by Darryl Stonum. The Boilermakers struck back with less than a minute to go in the half when Kory Sheets scored another TD, this time on a 3-yard run. At halftime the Wolverines were up 28–21.

In the 3rd quarter, the Wolverines were shut out, but the Boilermakers scored 2 more TD's, both by Kory Sheets, making his day's total 4. His 3rd of the game came on a 7-yard pass, tying the game. His final TD of the game was on a 5-yard run which put the Boilermakers ahead.

The scoring continued to see-saw in the fourth quarter. The Wolverines tied it back up when Brandon Minor ran in a TD from 12 yards out. Then Greg Orton put the Boilermakers back up by catching a 4-yard TD pass. The Wolverines re-tied the game when Brandon Minor got his 3rd TD of the game, this time on a 1-yard run. The Boilermakers put the game in the win column with less than 30 seconds left when Desmond Tardy caught a 28-yard TD pass. With the loss, Michigan was disqualified from all bowl games this season, the first time since 1967. Brandon Minor's 154 yards and 3 touchdowns set a school record. Purdue's 48 points was the most the school had ever scored against Michigan, and their first win against Michigan since 2000.

Statistics	MICH	PUR
First downs	15	25
Total yards	300	522
Rushing yards	177	256
Passing yards	144	266
Turnovers	1	1
Time of possession	37:42	22:18

Team	Category	Player	Statistics
Michigan	Passing	Steven Threet	9/21, 123 yards, 2 TD
Michigan	Rushing	Brandon Minor	24 rushes, 155 yards, 3 TD
Michigan	Receiving	Darryl Stonum	2 receptions, 61 yards, TD
Purdue	Passing	Justin Siller	21/34, 266 yards, 3 TD
Purdue	Rushing	Kory Sheets	30 rushes, 118 yards, 3 TD
Purdue	Receiving	Greg Orton	8 receptions, 89 yards, TD

=== At Minnesota ===
Michigan at Minnesota

Team	1	2	3	4	Total
• Wolverines	6	10	6	7	29
Golden Gophers	0	0	3	3	6

- Date: November 8
- Location: Hubert H. Humphrey Metrodome
  Minneapolis
- Game start: 12:00 p.m. EST
- Elapsed time: 2:58
- Game attendance: 55,040
- Game weather: Indoors
- Referee: John O'Neill
- TV announcers (ESPN): Pam Ward (Play-by-play) & Ray Bentley (Color)

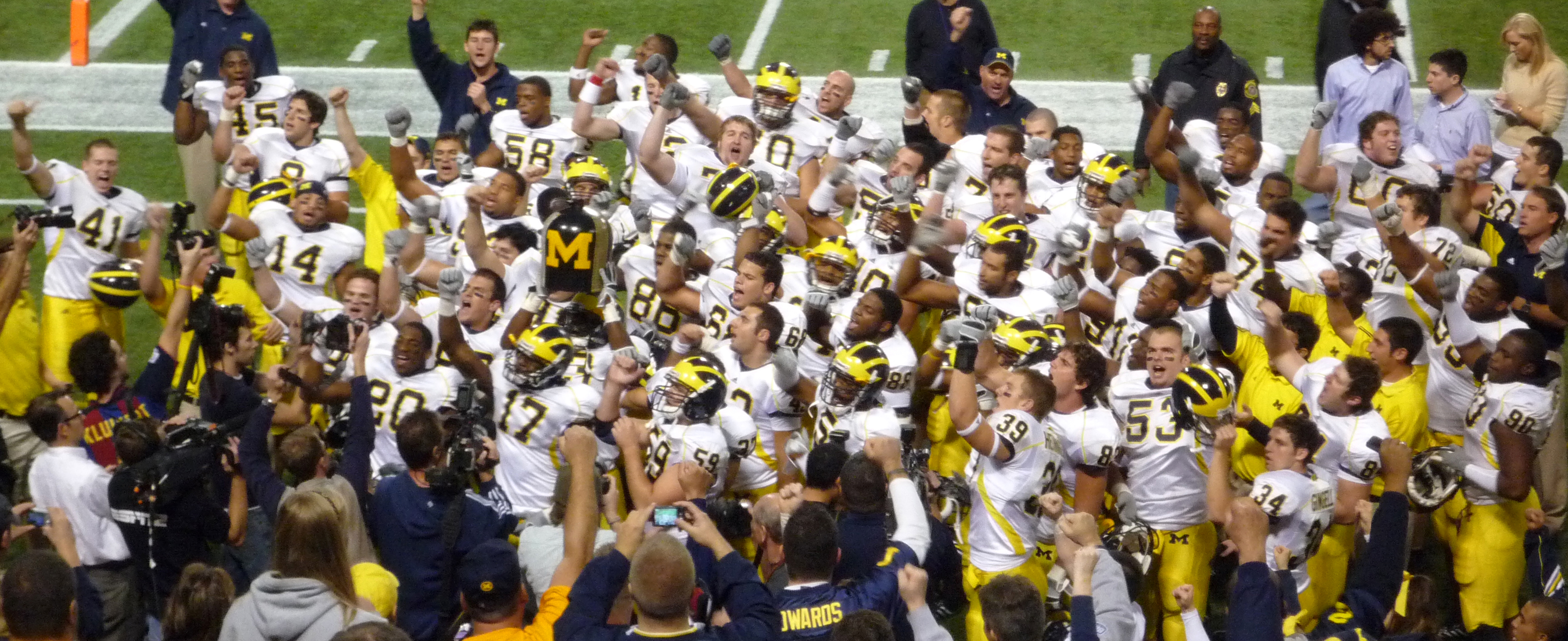
Players and coaches celebrate with the Little Brown Jug after their victory

In week 11, the Wolverines flew to Minneapolis, Minnesota to take on the Minnesota Golden Gophers for the Little Brown Jug. The first half was dominated by Michigan. Wolverines Kicker K.C. Lopata scored 3 field goals in the first half, 2 in the first quarter from 44 yards and 34 yards respectively, then another in the second quarter from 26 yards. Then Greg Mathews caught an 8-yard TD pass to put the Wolverines up 16–0 at halftime.

In the third quarter, the Wolverines scored first on a 48-yard field goal. Then the Golden Gophers finally got on the board with a 28-yard field goal from kicker Joel Monroe. Then K.C. Lopata got his fifth and final field goal of the game, this one from 23 yards out. In the fourth quarter, the Golden Gophers managed to score on another field goal, this one from 32 yards out. The final score of the game was when Mark Moundros of the Wolverines ran in a TD from 3 yards out. It was the Wolverines' 12th straight win in the Metrodome. With the Gophers' move to the new TCF Bank Stadium in the 2009 season, the Wolverines could claim to have never lost in the Metrodome.

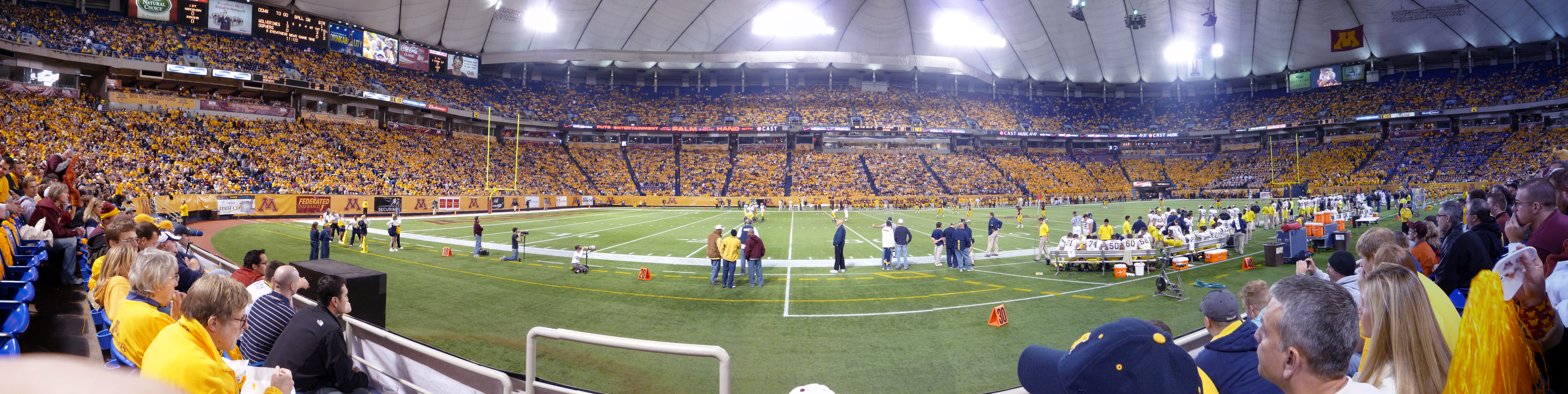
The 91st battle for the Little Brown Jug

Statistics	MICH	MINN
First downs	20	8
Total yards	435	188
Rushing yards	232	83
Passing yards	203	127
Turnovers	1	1
Time of possession	25:47	34:13

Team	Category	Player	Statistics
Michigan	Passing	Nick Sheridan	18/30, 203 yards, TD
Michigan	Rushing	Michael Shaw	8 rushes, 71 yards
Michigan	Receiving	Greg Mathews	6 receptions, 79 yards, TD
Minnesota	Passing	Adam Weber	13/24, 105 yards, INT
Minnesota	Rushing	DeLeon Eskridge	11 rushes, 80 yards
Minnesota	Receiving	Brandon Green	2 receptions, 36 yards

=== Northwestern ===
Northwestern at Michigan

Team	1	2	3	4	Total
• Wildcats	7	0	14	0	21
Wolverines	7	7	0	0	14

- Date: November 15
- Location: Michigan Stadium
  Ann Arbor, Michigan
- Game start: 12:00 p.m. EST
- Elapsed time: 3:03
- Game attendance: 107,856
- Game weather: 45 °F (7 °C), Light Steady Rain, W 20 mph (32 km/h)
- Referee: Dave Witvoet
- TV announcers (ESPN2): Pam Ward (Play-by-play) & Ray Bentley (Color)

For their final home game of the season, the Wolverines hosted the Northwestern Wildcats. In the rain and snow, the Wildcats struck first midway through the first quarter when Stephen Simmons ran in a 21-yard TD. The Wolverines tied it up near the end of the 1st when QB Nick Sheridan ran in a TD himself from 3 yards out. The only score of the 2nd quarter was when Rick Reyes of the Wolverines blocked a punt and picked it up for a 3-yard TD run.

The second half was all Northwestern. First Ross Lane caught a 17-yard TD pass to tie it up. Then Eric Peterman caught a 53 yard long bomb for another TD, sealing the win for the Wildcats. With this loss, Michigan fell to 3–8, the school's most losses in a single-season in 129 years of football. It was also just Northwestern's second win in Ann Arbor in its past 21 trips. The program's only other win there since 1960 came in the Rose Bowl season of 1995.

Statistics	NU	MICH
First downs	14	15
Total yards	257	264
Rushing yards	59	181
Passing yards	220	84
Turnovers	2	2
Time of possession	27:19	32:41

Team	Category	Player	Statistics
Northwestern	Passing	C. J. Bachér	17/29, 198 yards, 2 TD, 2 INT
Northwestern	Rushing	Stephen Simmons	22 rushes, 56 yards, TD
Northwestern	Receiving	Eric Peterman	5 receptions, 79 yards, TD
Michigan	Passing	Nick Sheridan	8/29, 61 yards
Michigan	Rushing	Carlos Brown	23 rushes, 115 yards
Michigan	Receiving	Greg Mathews	5 receptions, 46 yards

=== At No. 10 Ohio State ===
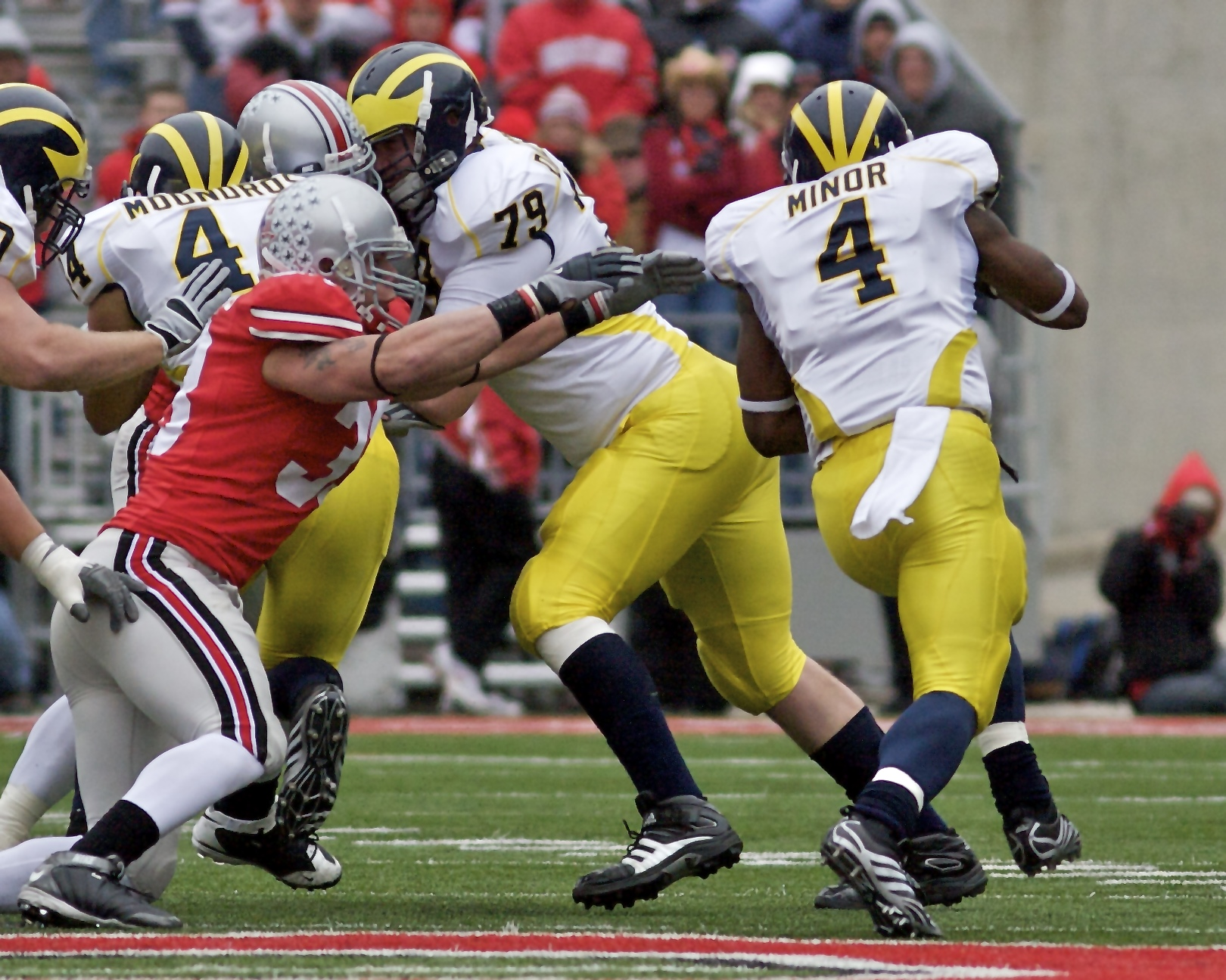
James Laurinaitis chases Brandon Minor during the 2008 Michigan – Ohio State rivalry game

Michigan at Ohio State

Team	1	2	3	4	Total
Wolverines	0	7	0	0	7
• No. 10 Buckeyes	7	7	14	14	42

- Date: November 22
- Location: Ohio Stadium
  Columbus, Ohio
- Game start: 12:00 p.m. EST
- Elapsed time: 3:04
- Game attendance: 105,564
- Game weather: 28 °F (−2 °C), Partly Cloudy, W 4 mph (6.4 km/h)
- Referee: Bill LeMonnier
- TV announcers (ABC): Brad Nessler (Play-by-play), Bob Griese (Color), Paul Maguire (Color) & Stacey Dales (Sideline)

For their final game of the season, the Wolverines traveled to Columbus, Ohio to take on their bitter rival the Ohio State Buckeyes for the 105th time in the rivalry (see Michigan-Ohio State rivalry). The Buckeyes scored first when Chris Wells ran in a 59-yard TD. The Buckeyes made it 14-0 when Brian Hartline caught a 53 yard long bomb for another TD just after the start of the second quarter. Michigan got their only points of the game when Brandon Minor ran in a 1-yard TD near halftime.

The second half was all Ohio State. First Daniel Herron got a huge 49-yard run for a TD in the 3rd quarter. Later in the 3rd, Brian Robiske caught an 8-yard TD pass. Just after the start of the 4th, Daniel Herron scored again, this time on a 2-yard TD run. Brian Hartline later caught an 18-yard TD pass.

With the loss, Michigan's season ended with a 3–9 record, officially the worst for the school in the 129 years of the football program. This was their fifth loss in a row to Ohio State, and made the 2008 senior class the second in a row never to beat the Buckeyes.

Statistics	MICH	OSU
First downs	11	13
Total yards	198	416
Rushing yards	111	232
Passing yards	109	209
Turnovers	2	1
Time of possession	30:35	29:25

Team	Category	Player	Statistics
Michigan	Passing	Nick Sheridan	8/24, 87 yards
Michigan	Rushing	Brandon Minor	14 rushes, 67 yards, TD
Michigan	Receiving	Martavious Odoms	5 receptions, 37 yards
Ohio State	Passing	Terrelle Pryor	5/13, 120 yards, 2 TD, INT
Ohio State	Rushing	Beanie Wells	15 rushes, 134 yards, TD
Ohio State	Receiving	Brian Hartline	2 receptions, 71 yards, 2 TD

== Personnel ==
=== Coaching staff ===
- Rich Rodriguez – Head coach
- Calvin Magee – Associate head coach / offensive coordinator
- Scott Shafer – Defensive coordinator
- Tony Dews – Wide receivers
- Greg Frey – Offensive line
- Tony Gibson – Assistant to the Regional Head Coach / Secondary
- Jay Hopson – Defensive assistant
- Fred Jackson – Running backs
- Rod Smith – Quarterbacks
- Bruce Tall – Defensive line
- Alex Herron – Graduate assistant/offense
- Jahmile Addae – Graduate assistant/defense
- Eric Smith – Offensive Quality Control
- Bryan Wright – Offensive Quality Control
- Adam Braithwate – Defensive Quality Control
- Dan Hott – Defensive Quality Control
- Mike Barwis – Strength and conditioning coordinator

=== Roster ===
(as of December 15, 2008)
Quarterback: 12 David Cone – (redshirt) Sophomore; 3 Justin Feagin – Freshman; 8 Nick Sheridan – (redshirt) Sophomore; 10 Steven Threet – (redshirt) Freshman; Wide receiver: 17 Toney Clemons – Sophomore; 89 Jon Conover – (redshirt) Sophomore; 21 Junior Hemingway – Sophomore; 13 Greg Mathews – Junior; 31 Ryan Meyers – (redshirt) Freshman; 9 Martavious Odoms – Freshman; 37 Ricky Reyes – (redshirt) Sophomore; 7 Terrence Robinson – Freshman; 18 James Rogers – Sophomore; 16 Roy Roundtree – Freshman; 82 LaTerryal Savoy – (redshirt) Junior; 22 Darryl Stonum – Freshman; Offensive lineman: 56 Ricky Barnum – Freshman; 61 Zac Ciullo – (redshirt) Freshman; 79 Perry Dorrestein – (redshirt) Sophomore; 74 John Ferrara – (redshirt) Sophomore; 72 Mark Huyge – (redshirt) Freshman; 63 Rocko Khoury – Freshman; 62 Tim McAvoy – (redshirt) Junior; 57 Elliott Mealer – Freshman; 50 David Molk – (redshirt) Freshman; 60 David Moosman – (redshirt) Junior; 70 Bryant Nowicki – (redshirt) Sophomore; 78 Dann O'Neill – Freshman; 65 Patrick Omameh – Freshman; 71 Mark Ortmann – (redshirt) Junior; 91 Tom Pomarico – (redshirt) Freshman; 69 Michael Ramirez – (redshirt) Sophomore; 52 Stephen Schilling – (redshirt) Sophomore; 64 Kurt Wermers – Freshman; 75 Cory Zirbel – (redshirt) Junior; Fullback: 32 Vince Helmuth – Sophomore; 43 John McColgan – (redshirt) Freshman; 44 Mark Moundros – (redshirt) Sophomore; 24 Kevin Grady – (redshirt) Junior	Running back: 23 Carlos Brown – Junior; 15 Michael Cox – Freshman; 34 Avery Horn (redshirt) Freshman; 20 Michael Shaw – Freshman; 38 Mike Milano – (redshirt) Junior; 4 Brandon Minor – Junior; 35 Jimmy Potempa – (redshirt) Freshman; 2 Sam McGuffie – Freshman; Tight end: 46 Jon Bills – (redshirt) Freshman; 86 Kevin Koger – Freshman; 83 Mike Massey – (redshirt) Senior; 88 Brandon Moore – Freshman; 96 Mike Therman – (redshirt) Sophomore; 81 Steve Watson – (redshirt) Freshman; 80 Martell Webb – Sophomore; 85 Carson Butler – (redshirt) Junior; Defensive tackle: 97 Will Johnson – (redshirt) Senior; 93 Jason Kates – (redshirt) Sophomore; 68 Mike Martin – Freshman; 95 Renaldo Sagesse – Sophomore; 67 Terrance Taylor – Senior; Defensive end: 92 Greg Banks – (redshirt) Sophomore; 88 Andre Criswell – (redshirt) Junior; 55 Brandon Graham – Junior; 39 Will Heininger – (redshirt) Freshman; 90 Tim Jamison – (redshirt) Senior; 89 Tim North – (redshirt) Junior; 99 Adam Patterson – Junior; 53 Ryan Van Bergen – (redshirt) Freshman; Linebacker: 25 Kenny Demens – Freshman; 9 Marell Evans – Sophomore; 45 Obi Ezeh – (redshirt) Sophomore; 51 Mike Fish – (redshirt) Sophomore; 42 J.B. Fitzgerald – Freshman; 59 Paul Gyarmati – Freshman; 58 Brandon Herron – (redshirt) Freshman; 52 Kevin Leach – (redshirt) Freshman; 46 Brandon Logan – Senior; 8 Jonas Mouton – (redshirt) Sophomore; 50 Ohene Opong-Owusu – (redshirt) Junior; 54 Austin Panter – Senior; 49 John Thompson – (redshirt) Senior	Cornerback: 17 Tony Anderson – (redshirt) Freshman; 22 Bobby Centrelivre – (redshirt) Sophomore; 33 Boubacar Cissoko – Freshman; 35 Doug Dutch – (redshirt) Senior; 12 J.T. Floyd – Freshman; 19 Zach Johnson – (redshirt) Freshman; 14 Morgan Trent – (redshirt) Senior; 6 Donovan Warren – Sophomore; 29 Troy Woolfolk – Sophomore; Safety: 3 Stevie Brown – Junior; 38 Artis Chambers – Sophomore; 30 Shakir Edwards – (redshirt) Senior; 27 Brandon Harrison – Senior; 26 Nick Koenighsknecht – (redshirt) Sophomore; 21 Jordan Reilly – (redshirt) Freshman; 25 Doug Rogan – (redshirt) Freshman; 23 Floyd Simmons – Freshman; 28 Brandon Smith – Freshman; 5 Charles Stewart – (redshirt) Senior; 32 Karl Tech – (redshirt) Freshman; 40 Michael Williams – (redshirt) Freshman; Long snapper: 59 Sean Griffin – (redshirt) Senior; 73 George Morales – Freshman; Punter: 30 Chris Berry – (redshirt) Sophomore; 41 Zoltan Mesko – (redshirt) Junior; Place kicker: 34 Jason Gingell – (redshirt) Senior; 84 K.C. Lopata – (redshirt) Senior; 92 Jason Olesnavage – (redshirt) Junior; 97 Scott Schrimscher – (redshirt) Freshman; 43 Bryan Wright – (redshirt) Sophomore

=== Players redshirted in 2008 ===
- 56 Ricky Barnum – Freshman
- 15 Michael Cox – Freshman
- 25 Kenny Demens – Freshman
- 12 J.T. Floyd – Freshman
- 59 Paul Gyarmati – Freshman
- 21 Junior Hemingway – Sophomore
- 63 Rocko Khoury – Freshman
- 57 Elliott Mealer – Freshman
- 88 Brandon Moore – Freshman
- 73 George Morales – Freshman
- 65 Patrick Omameh – Freshman
- 78 Dann O'Neill – Freshman
- 7 Terrence Robinson – Freshman
- 16 Roy Roundtree – Freshman
- 23 Floyd Simmons – Freshman
- 28 Brandon Smith – Freshman
- 64 Kurt Wermers – Freshman
