= Obi Ezeh =

American football player (1988–2024)

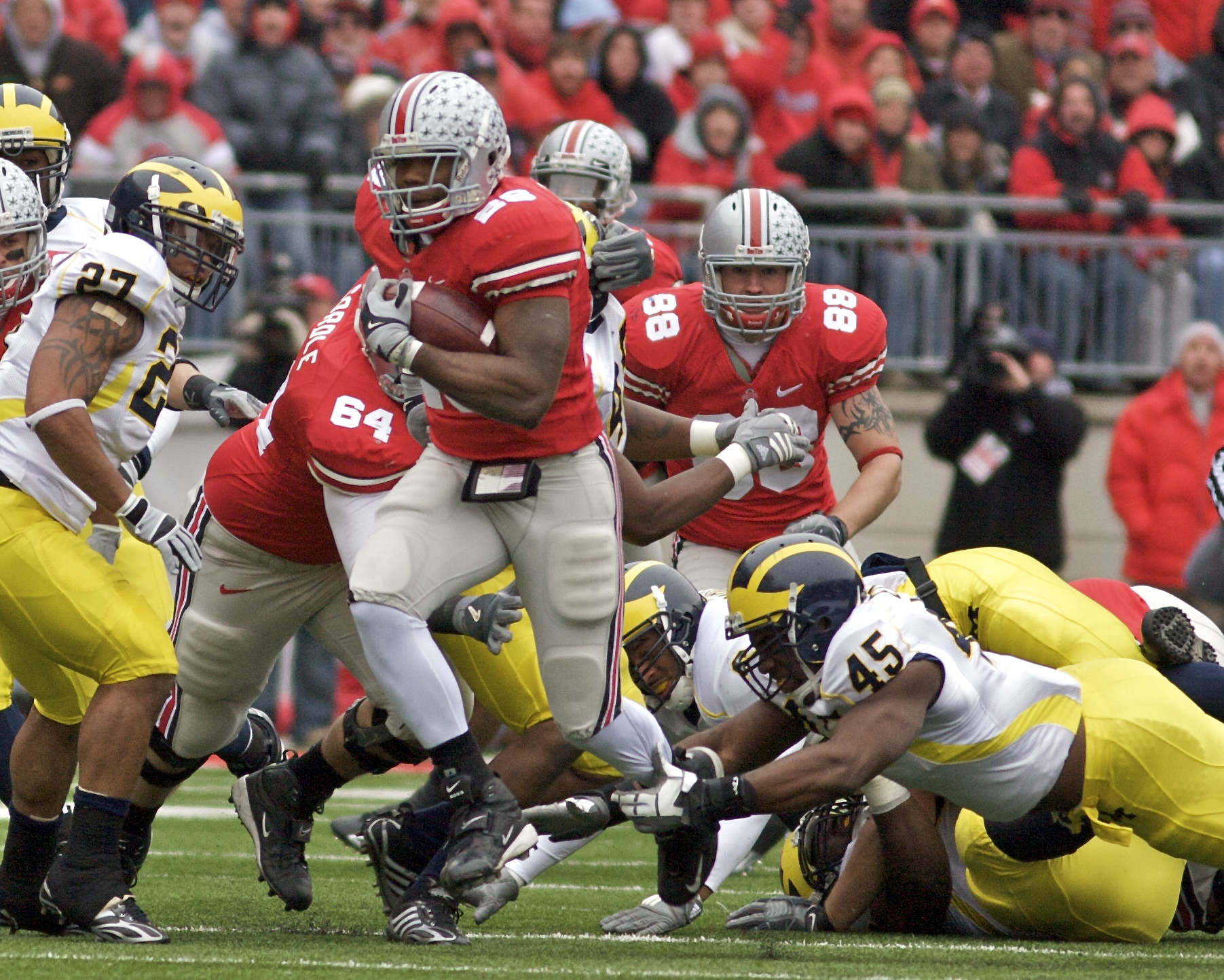
- Ezeh attempts to shoestring tackle Beanie Wells during the 2008 Michigan – Ohio State rivalry game.

No. 92
- Position: Linebacker

Personal information
- Born: February 2, 1988; Grand Rapids, Michigan, U.S.
- Died: May 3, 2024 (aged 36); Grand Rapids, Michigan, U.S.
- Listed height: 6 ft 2 in (1.88 m)
- Listed weight: 243 lb (110 kg)

Career information
- High school: Catholic Central (Grand Rapids)
- College: Michigan
- NFL draft: 2011: undrafted

Career history
- Washington Redskins (2011)*
- * Offseason or practice squad member only

Awards and highlights
- 2007 Freshman All-America (CollegeFootballNews 1st-team, Sporting News 2nd team)
- Stats at Pro Football Reference

Obi Pius Ezeh (February 2, 1988 – May 3, 2024) was an American college football player who was a linebacker for the Michigan Wolverines. He was included on both the 2009 mid-season and the 2009 preseason watchlist for the Butkus Award. He ended his career as the Wolverines' active career leader in tackles.

In high school, he played running back on offense more regularly than linebacker on defense. He shared running back duties as a sophomore and junior before becoming the starting running back as a senior at Catholic Central High School in Grand Rapids, Michigan. He established his school career rushing record of nearly 3,000 yards. As a senior, he scored a two-point conversion to give his school a one-point victory and a berth in the 2005 Michigan High School Athletic Association state championship game at Ford Field. He was also a member of a three-time state champion high school rugby team and was invited to try out with the United States national rugby union team.

At Michigan, he redshirted as a true freshman. Then, as a redshirt freshman for the 2007 Michigan Wolverines football team, he battled for the starting middle linebacker position and appeared to have lost the position early in the season. However, after an injury he became a regular starter. He concluded the season with thirteen and twelve tackle efforts against bitter rivals Michigan State and Ohio State, respectively. He started his redshirt sophomore season with a Big Ten Conference defensive player of the week, fifteen-tackle effort for the 2008 Michigan Wolverines football team. He finished the season as an honorable mention All-Big Ten Conference selection. Just after earning 2009 midseason Butkus Award watchlist recognition, he was removed from the starting lineup and saw limited action in the final four games.

After his senior season in 2010, Ezeh declared for the 2011 NFL draft, where he went undrafted. He later signed as an undrafted free agent with the Washington Redskins.

== High school ==
As a youth, Ezeh was unable to play football because he was too big for the local leagues according to Grand Rapids area officials. As a sophomore running back for the 2003 Catholic Central Cougars football team, Ezeh had several 100-yard games as well as multiple touchdown games, even though he was not the primary weapon in the backfield. Ezeh was also a member of the Cougars rugby team that placed 11th at the 2004 United States High School Rugby National Championships.

As a junior running back, he opened his football season with 170 yards on 18 carries. In the 2004 district championship game, he rushed for 88 yards in the first half, but was held to 5 in the second half as Catholic Central lost 33–20. Over the course of the season he compiled 907 rushing yards and 13 touchdowns. Ezeh was recognized as a Detroit News Class B All-state honorable mention linebacker. He was also selected as Grand Rapids All-area honorable mention, according to The Grand Rapids Press. He also helped lead the 2005 rugby team to a State Championship threepeat.

In 2005, Ezeh entered his senior season as the focal point of his school's running game and was rated as the seventh-best football prospect in the state of Michigan, according to The Detroit News. He was also invited to try out for the United States national rugby union team as an outside center. During the season, Ezeh was regularly among the leading rushers in the area. In the Division 4 state semifinal game, Ezeh returned a kickoff 80 yards for a touchdown and rushed for 136 yards on 24 carries. During the game, after Catholic Central scored on a quarterback sneak with 2:28 remaining, Ezeh scored on a two-point conversion to give his team a 35–34 victory. This led them to the 2005 MHSAA state championship game at Ford Field, which they lost 17–10 to Powers Catholic High School. By the end of the season, Ezeh had compiled a school record 2,914 career rushing yards, which included 33 touchdowns. During his senior year, he also occasionally played linebacker, recording 34 tackles (16 for a loss). Although, he missed part of the season with an ankle injury, he totaled 1,391 yards and 10 touchdowns on 217 carries and added seven pass receptions, including one touchdown, and he was recognized as a 2nd-team All-area running back. The Detroit News recognized him as their postseason number six blue chip prospect in the state, and he was selected to play in the Michigan High School Football Coaches Association's annual all-star game. In February 2006, he signed his letter of intent to play for Michigan, where it was unclear whether he would play fullback, tight end or linebacker.

College recruiting
Name	Hometown	School	Height	Weight	40^{‡}	Commit date
Obi Ezeh; RB	Grand Rapids, Michigan	Catholic Central (MI)	6 ft 2 in (1.88 m)	219.5 lb (99.6 kg)	4.6	Dec 11, 2005
Obi Ezeh; RB	Recruit ratings: Scout: Rivals: (69)					
Overall recruit ranking: Scout: 72 (RB) Rivals: 51 (RB), 12 (MI) ESPN: 130 (RB)
Note: In many cases, Scout, Rivals, 247Sports, On3, and ESPN may conflict in their listings of height and weight.; In these cases, the average was taken. ESPN grades are on a 100-point scale.; Sources: "Michigan Football Commitments". Rivals.; "2006 Michigan Football Commits". Scout.; "ESPN". ESPN.; "Scout.com Team Recruiting Rankings". Scout.; "2006 Team Ranking". Rivals.com.

== Michigan ==
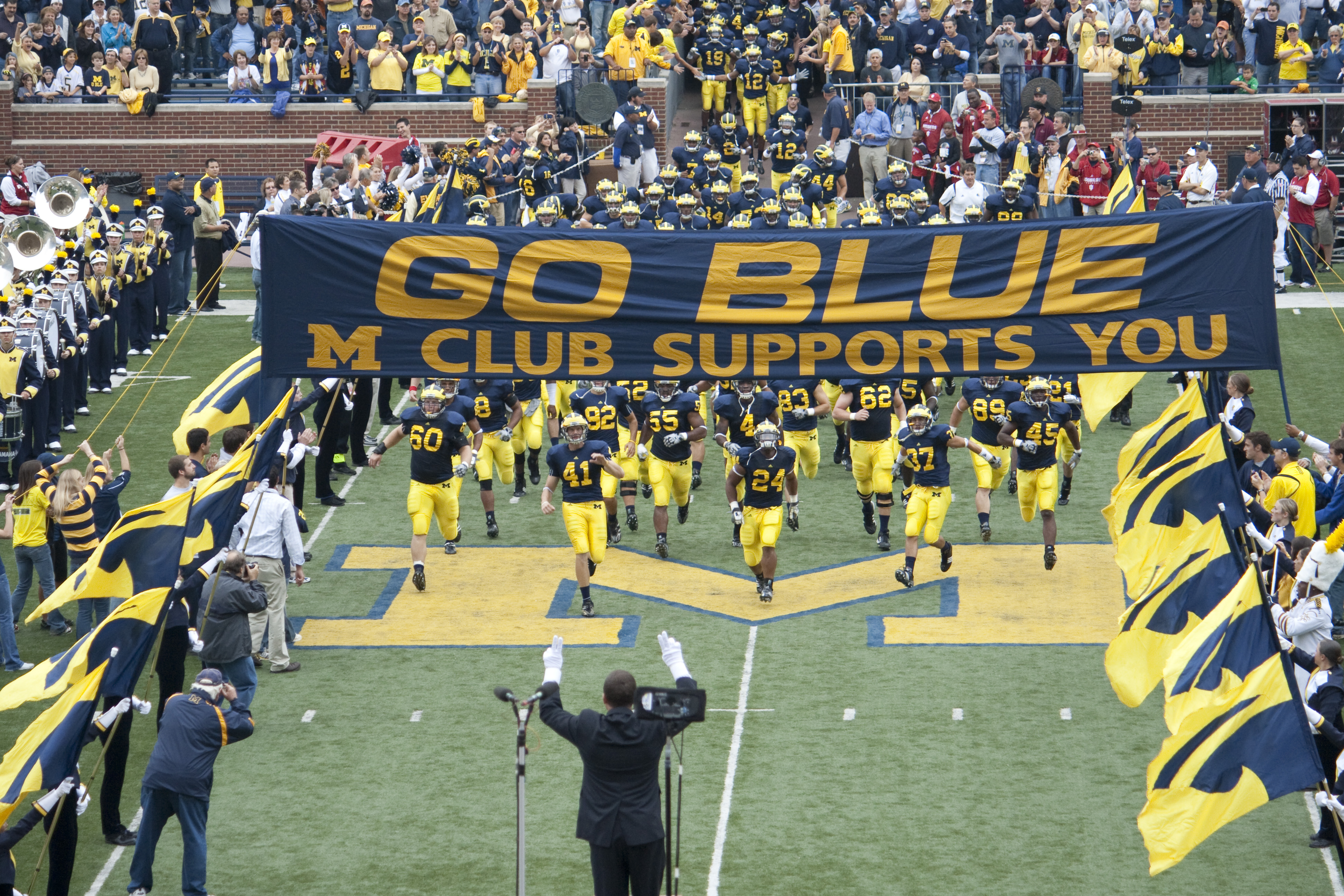
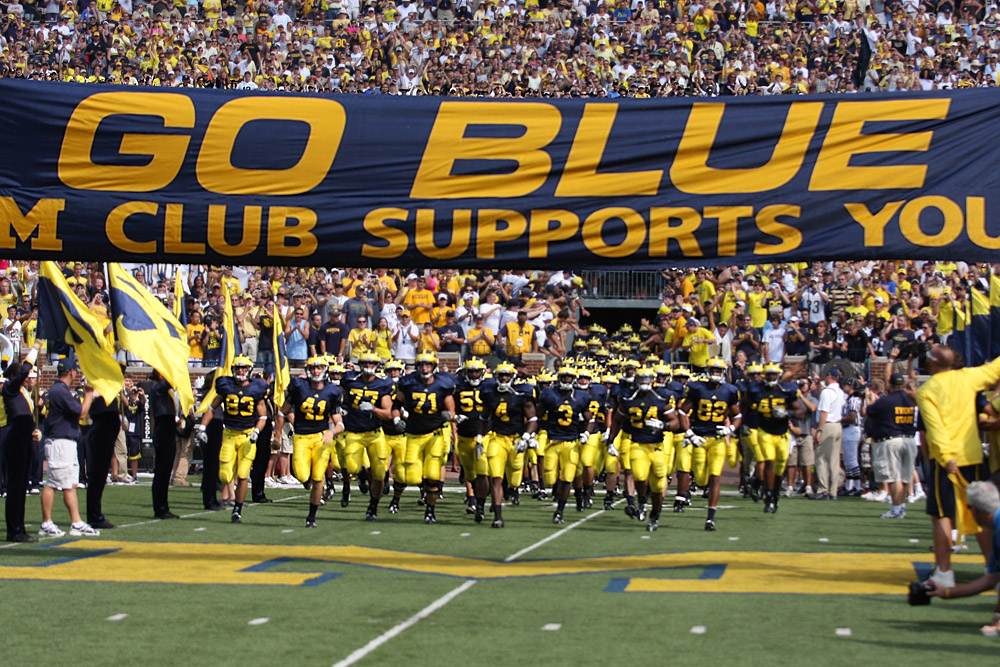
Ezeh led the 2009 Michigan Wolverines football team onto the field (above September 26 and below September 5)

As expected, Ezeh, who had suffered a shoulder injury, redshirted his freshman year. Prior to his redshirt freshman season, he changed jersey numbers from 44 to 45 as he converted from fullback to linebacker. On May 22, 2007, he was charged with suspicion of operating a vehicle while intoxicated for an incident when his vehicle struck a utility pole on the same street on which he lives while his blood-alcohol content was 0.11% (the legal limit in Michigan is 0.08%). Ezeh pleaded not guilty, and the trial was scheduled for September 19 in the 15th District Court. The time of the accident was outside the permissible times for Ezeh's restricted driving license that resulted from a prior non-alcohol-related accident. On the football field, redshirt freshman Ezeh entered the 2007 NCAA Division I FBS football season for the 2007 Michigan Wolverines football team in a three-way battle to replace NFL-bound David Harris at middle linebacker with redshirt junior John Thompson and junior college transfer Austin Panter, who had been named national junior college defensive player of the year. Harris also hailed from Grand Rapids and had worn the number 45. The week before the season opener, The Detroit News declared Ezeh the starter, however, the Ann Arbor News and Ezeh's hometown The Grand Rapids Press both stated that the race between Ezeh and Thompson was undecided heading into the game. In the aftermath of the September 1, opening game loss to two-time defending FCS champion Appalachian State Mountaineers, more was made of the fact that both players had trouble playing the position than who had started the game. Ezeh started the first game, but lost his spot to Thompson in the next two. After three weeks of play, Thompson, who had been voted the hardest hitter on the team the previous two seasons, had established himself as the starter by ranking second on the team in tackles. However, although Thompson had stepped up to the role he was notable for having trouble with pass coverage. Ezeh accumulated no statistics in the third and fourth game, but recorded his first interception in the fifth game on September 29 against Northwestern on a deflected pass. Ezeh started that game because of an injury. The following week, he again started in place of the injured Thompson and recorded nine tackles against Eastern Michigan. He also forced a fumble and fielded one kickoff return. Even though Thompson recovered from his ankle injury after four weeks, Ezeh retained the starting job the remainder of the season for a total of ten starts. Thompson only recorded four tackles the rest of the year. On November 1, his lawyer stated that on August 29 Ezeh had pleaded guilty to an operating while visibly intoxicated charge, which is a serious misdemeanor but a lesser charge than the original operating a vehicle while intoxicated, and had sought alcohol counseling prior to his sentence. The plea resulted in a year's probation, three days in a work release program, a substantial payment covering fines, court costs and restitution. He committed to attend a Mothers Against Drunk Driving class. In the November 3 Paul Bunyan Trophy victory against Michigan State he recorded a season-high 13 tackles and two sacks. One of the sacks occurred on Michigan State's final series of downs in Michigan territory to help secure the 28–24 win. Ezeh recorded 12 tackles in the Michigan – Ohio State rivalry game against Ohio State on November 17 to end the regular season.

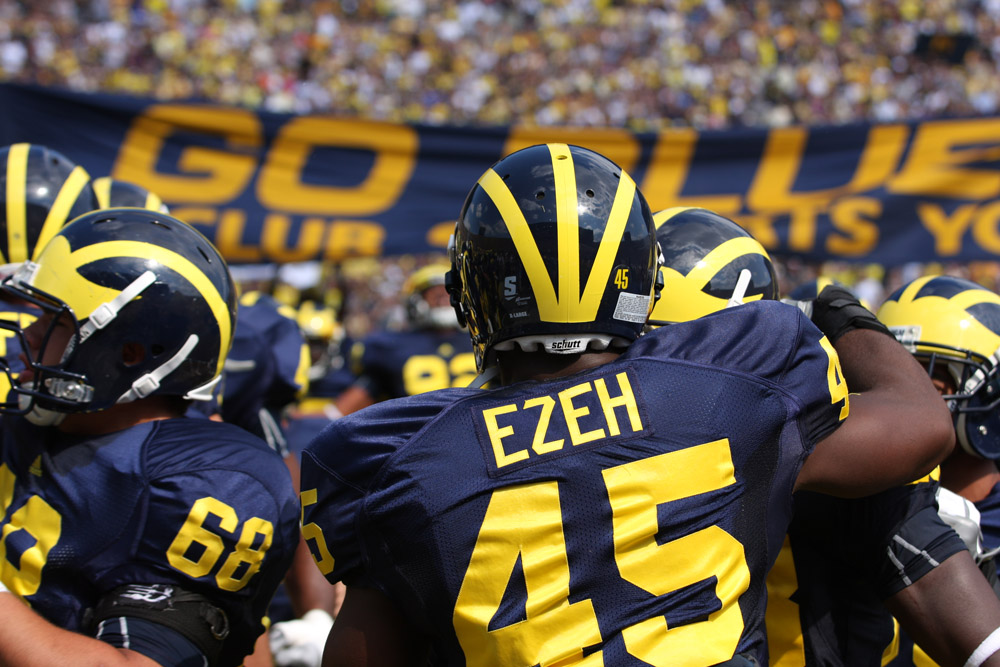
Obi Ezeh on September 5, 2009

After the graduation of Shawn Crable and Chris Graham there was again a notable battle for linebacker positions entering the 2008 NCAA Division I FBS football season for the 2008 Michigan Wolverines football team. Ezeh who had posted 68 tackles in 2007 was the leading returning tackler. As the only returning starting linebacker, Ezeh assumed the role of mentor. Ezeh won the Big Ten Defensive Player of the Week award on September 1, 2008, for a game against the Utah Utes where he recorded 15 tackles and an interception. He also earned an ABC Player of the Game recognition. Ezeh also posted fifteen tackles in the October 4 game against the Illinois Fighting Illini, which earned him his second ABC Player of the Game award. He posted two other double digit tackle games, including a ten tackle effort in his second Paul Bunyan Trophy game. Ezeh finished the season seventh in the Big Ten in tackles. He was recognized as an honorable mention All-Big Ten selection by both the coaches and the media. He won the 2008 Roger Zatkoff Award as Michigan's top linebacker.

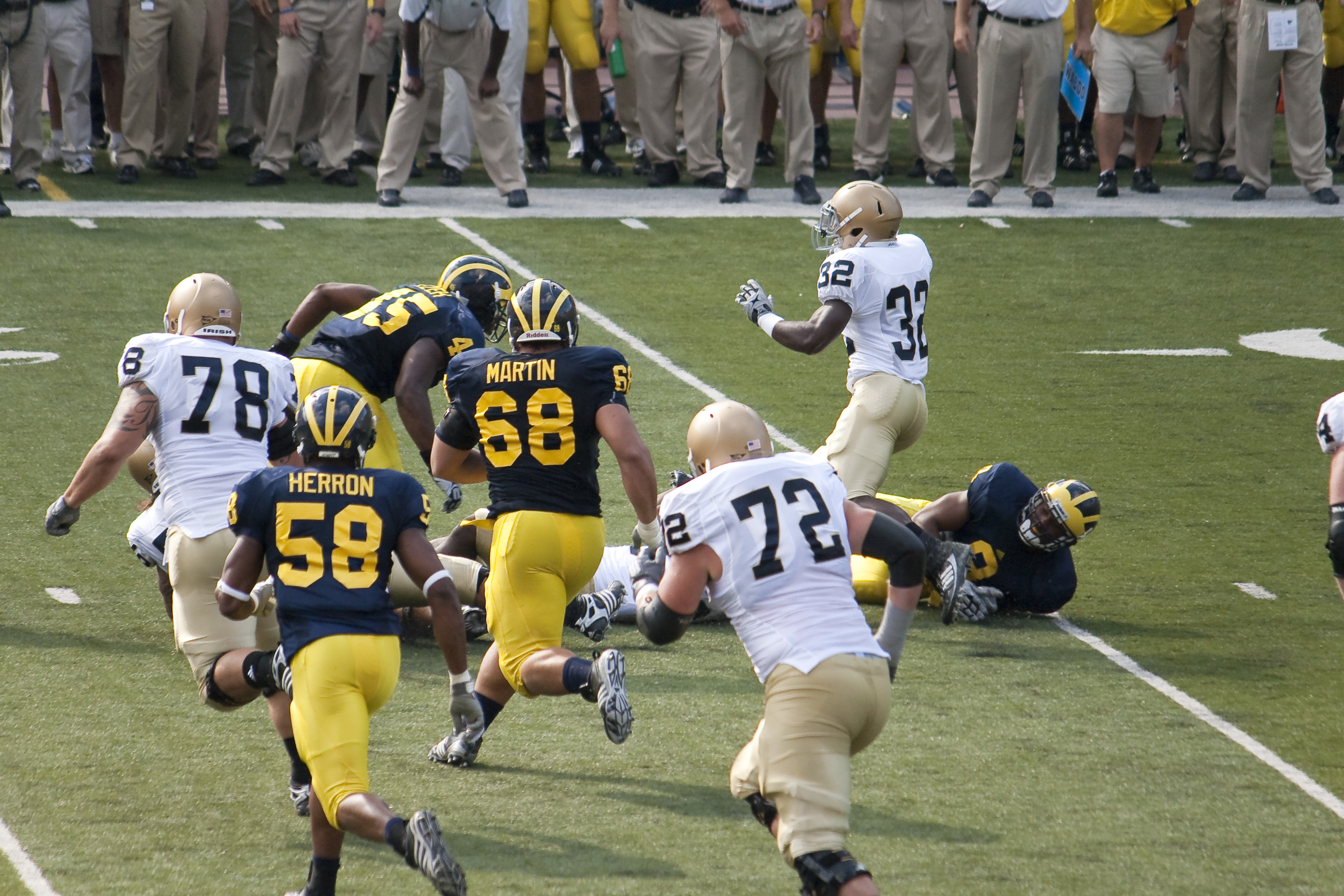
Ezeh lines up Theo Riddick during 2009 Michigan-Notre Dame rivalry game.

Ezeh entered the 2009 NCAA Division I FBS football season opener with the third most career starts (23) on the 2009 Michigan Wolverines football team behind punter Zoltan Mesko (38) and offensive lineman Stephen Schilling (26). As a redshirt junior during the 2009 season for the Wolverines, Ezeh posted fourteen tackles against Michigan State bringing his three-game career total to 37 tackles against the Spartans. Ezeh had grown up in a neighborhood with many Michigan State fans who flew their Michigan State flags, and he once attended Michigan Football camp wearing a Michigan State shirt. He was included on both the 2009 midseason and the 2009 preseason watchlist for the Butkus Award. The midseason list includes sixteen linebackers. Although he was added to the midseason Butkus watchlist in mid October, on October 31 he was removed from the starting lineup after starting 29 straight games.

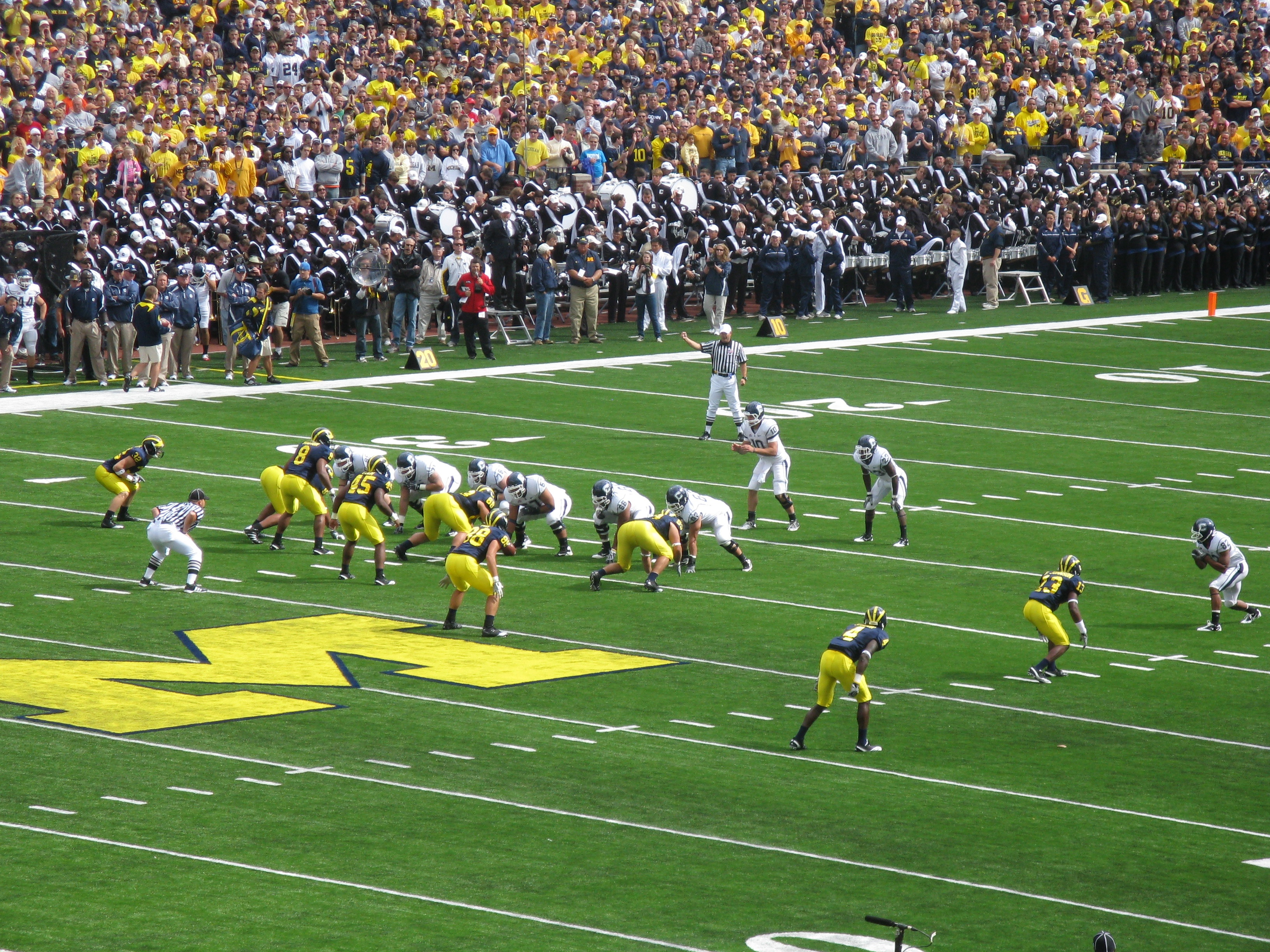
Defensive unit for the 2010 Wolverines vs. the 2010 Connecticut Huskies (including #32 Jordan Kovacs, #8 Jonas Mouton, #45 Ezeh, #68 Mike Martin and #88 Craig Roh

During the 2010 NCAA Division I FBS football season he started the first six games for the 2010 Michigan Wolverines football team before losing the starting middle linebacker position to Kenny Demens. Ezeh's final regular start was against Michigan State on October 9, when he tied his season-high with nine tackles and boosted his career total against Michigan State to 46. When Jonas Mouton was unavailable for the Purdue game on November 13 due to a chest injury, Ezeh stepped in and recorded his first sack of the season as well as eight solo tackles.

== Professional career ==
At his initial March 17, 2011, pro day, he posted modest numbers: 40-yard dash - 5.07 seconds; vertical jump 30 inches (76.2 cm) and standing broad jump 9 feet 2 inches (2.79 m). However, after hiring a new trainer he posted better numbers at an April regional combine: 40-yard dash - 4.81 seconds; vertical jump 34.5 inches (87.6 cm) and standing broad jump 9 feet 4 inches (2.84 m) as well as a 4.81 time in the 20-yard shuttle.

He went undrafted in the 2011 NFL draft and in the first few days following the 2011 NFL lockout he went unsigned, before signing with the Washington Redskins as an undrafted free agent on July 31, 2011. He was waived on August 19.

== Personal life and death ==
Born on February 2, 1988, Ezeh was the son of Pius and Nkechy. He had four siblings: Onyinye, Kaka, Nnenna and Nicole. His hometown was Grand Rapids, Michigan.

Ezeh died in his sleep on May 3, 2024. He was 36.
