= Steven Threet =

American football player (born 1989)

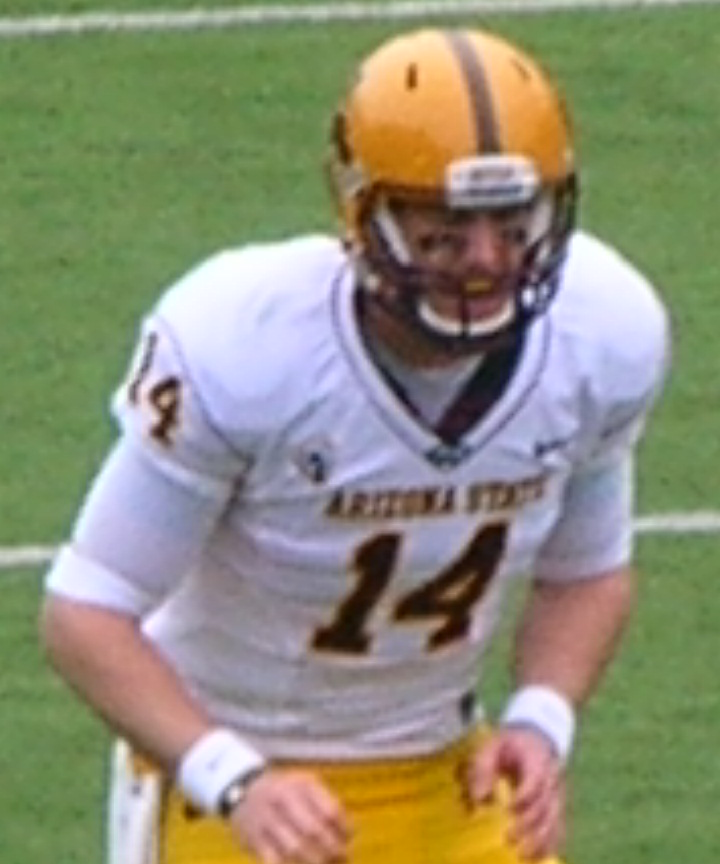
- Threet with the Arizona State Sun Devils in 2010

Biographical details
- Born: January 2, 1989 (age 37)

Playing career
- 2007 (spring): Georgia Tech
- 2007–2008: Michigan
- 2009–2010: Arizona State
- Position: Quarterback

Coaching career (HC unless noted)
- 2011: Arizona State (SA)

Steven Charles Threet (born January 2, 1989) is an American former football quarterback who played for both Michigan and Arizona State. He was the starting quarterback for the Arizona State Sun Devils. During the 2010 season Threet completed 208 of 336 passes for 2,553 yards, 18 touchdowns and 16 interceptions. He passed for a career-high 391 yards and three touchdowns against Northern Arizona in September 2010.

He threw for 4,824 yards and 49 touchdowns as a high school player in Adrian, Michigan, and was ranked by Rivals.com as the No. 9 quarterback prospect in the nation in the Class of 2006. Threet committed to Georgia Tech and enrolled early there in January 2007.

After the coaches who had recruited him left the program, Threet announced in July 2007 that he was transferring to the University of Michigan under head coach Lloyd Carr. Carr was replaced before the 2008 season by Rich Rodriguez. After sitting out the 2007 season under NCAA transfer rules, the redshirt freshman Threet would go on to start at quarterback in eight of Michigan's 12 games.

Later that same year, Threet transferred to Arizona State University, citing the incompatibility of his playing style as a traditional pro style dropback passer with the spread offense of Rodriguez. After sitting out the 2009 season, Threet had two years of eligibility remaining with Arizona State. On August 30, 2010, Arizona State head coach, Dennis Erickson, announced that Threet would be the starting quarterback for the coming season.

== Early years ==
Threet graduated from Adrian High School in Adrian, Michigan. As a junior, he had 1,528 passing yards and 19 touchdowns. As a senior, he passed for 1,896 yards and 20 touchdowns. In all, he threw for 4,824 yards and 49 touchdowns in three seasons at Adrian High School.

As a high school senior, Threet was four-star prospect and the No. 9 quarterback prospect nationally according to Rivals.com. He was also named to The Detroit News Division II All-State first team. In August 2006, Detroit Free Press sports writer Chris Silva wrote that Threet "has the brains of a Steven Q. Urkel and an arm of a young Peyton Manning. He can audible at the line of scrimmage, like NFL star Peyton Manning, and absorb a playbook faster than Urkel could memorize physics formulas. Threet had Ivy League schools such as Harvard and Princeton clamoring over his smarts and skills."

Threet had offers from several major schools, including Wisconsin, Stanford, Illinois, North Carolina State, Indiana, Cincinnati and Georgia Tech.

== College career ==
=== Georgia Tech ===
Threet committed to Georgia Tech in July 2006 and enrolled early in January 2007. His high school coach recalled, "He fell in love with the recruiters and the position coaches at Georgia Tech." Soon after Threet arrived at Georgia Tech, both of the coaches who had recruited him took jobs elsewhere. During spring practice in April 2007, The Atlanta Journal-Constitution reported that "Threet appeared to take the lead over Calvin Booker for the No. 2 quarterback spot," completing 7 of 11 passes for 51 yards and a touchdown while working with the No. 1 offense.

=== Michigan ===
In July 2007 Threet announced he would transfer to the University of Michigan. While Lloyd Carr was still head coach at Michigan, he had also recruited five-star quarterback Ryan Mallett. Threet called his former high school coach and left a message saying, "Coach, I'm going to go back to Michigan, and I'm going to beat [Ryan] Mallett out for that starting job." In a July 2007 interview with The Atlanta Journal-Constitution, Threet explained his decision: "The biggest thing is that the two coaches that recruited me took jobs at other schools, and that happened after I got there. People have been asking if it was homesickness, or classes were too hard, or if it was all the competition at Tech. It was not any of those at all. I had a 3.76 grade-point my first semester, and the competition (at Michigan) is as good or better."

Threet had been ineligible after his transfer from Georgia Tech. During the 2007 season, the majority of the snaps were taken by senior Chad Henne. However, Henne was sidelined by injury enough that Mallett received a considerable amount of playing time, appearing in 11 games (to Henne's 10) and attempting 141 passes (to Henne's 278). Carr, who had recruited both Mallett, and a year later, Threet, was set to retire as head coach, and Rodriguez was brought in to begin as head coach for the 2008 season. Mallett believed Rodriguez's offense to be unsuitable for a pocket passer, and therefore transferred to Arkansas. That made Michigan's quarterback job was up for grabs. Threet would battle to become the team's starting quarterback along with former walk-on redshirt sophomore, Nick Sheridan, and redshirt sophomore, David Cone. First-year Michigan head coach, Rich Rodriguez, tabbed Sheridan the Michigan starting quarterback to begin the 2008 season. Threet, although, saw action in Michigan's season opener against Utah, entering the game as a substitute and closing the 25–10 deficit before eventually losing, 25–23. He recorded 132 yards on 14-32 passing along with one touchdown and zero interceptions. Threet was slated for his first career start at Michigan in the following game against Miami (Ohio), although Sheridan would also see playing time. On the first offensive play for Michigan, Threet completed a screen pass to Martavious Odoms that was good for 50 yards. On the fifth play, Threet faked a handoff to Sam McGuffie and ran nine yards for a touchdown. Threet finished with six completions on 13 attempts for 63 yards and no touchdowns, although Michigan evened its season record at 1-1. Threet also started in a 35–17 loss against Notre Dame in the third week of the season. According to The Michigan Daily, "Threet's breakout start" came on the road against Notre Dame when he went 16-of-23 for 175 yards, one touchdown and no interceptions. The paper reported that Threet "played with poise, leading the Wolverines to 330 total yards."

After a bye week before the team's fourth game, Threet was named the starter again and would lead Michigan to their second biggest comeback in school history and the team's biggest win of the season. Michigan trailed #9 Wisconsin 19–0 with three minutes left in the third quarter and then scored 27 unanswered points in 13 minutes to take a 27–19 lead. After a poor performance in the first half, Threet led the team to 247 yards of total offense and 27 points in the second half. In the third quarter, he led the Wolverines on an 80-yard, 14-play drive ending with a 26-yard touchdown pass to Kevin Koger. Not known for his mobility, Threet's had a 58-yard run in the fourth quarter that set up Michigan's game-winning touchdown. After the game, Rodriguez said Threet's run "surprised a lot of people, maybe even himself." Quarterback coach Rod Smith said of Threet's second-half performance, "He's a competitor. He's got some heart. He'll fight you, which is what I want. That's a start, you know what I mean? We'll keep working on the rest."

In the sixth game of the season, Threet started against Toledo, but he was injured and sat out the second half of the game, which Michigan lost 13–10.

Starting in a 35–21 loss Michigan State, Threet completed 13 of 27 passes for 168 yards and a touchdown pass to go along with a career-high three interceptions.

In a start against Purdue later in the season, Threet threw two touchdown passes for the second time, including a 51-yard touchdown pass to Darryl Stonum. Michigan scored a season-high 42 points against Purdue, but the defense gave up 48 points in the game.

Threet missed two of the last three games of the season due to a shoulder injury. He did not make the trip to play against Ohio State. However, by the end of the season, The Michigan Daily wrote that "Threet has stepped up as a capable signal-caller ... And now, fans can take a measure of relief — Michigan has a quarterback."

One of the low points of the 2008 season for Threet came after the loss to Michigan State when Michigan's offensive coordinator Calvin Magee publicly criticized Threet's performance as "inconsistent, like it always is." Asked later about Magee's comments, Threet said:

"I guess I feel like that's a difference of philosophy from the previous staff. Granted, coaches do different things to get the most out of their players. Some people close to me were upset that a coach would call me out in front of the media, but you know, in the end it didn't really matter to me. And to be honest, my play in the Michigan State game was inconsistent. Is it right to say that at the press conference after the game? I mean, we had just lost a big rivalry game, so I would chalk most of that up to emotions after a big game like that."

The Michigan Daily's sports editor, Dan Feldman, later questioned the wisdom of Magee's public criticism of the team's starting quarterback. Feldman opined that Threet had been impressive and concluded, "Whatever happens from here, credit Threet for handling a difficult season with class."

Threet started a total of eight games, four more than Sheridan's season total. The team recorded its worst season ever after posting a 3–9 record and stopping the country's longest streak of consecutive bowl appearances at 33. He ended the season with 102 completions on 200 attempts for 1,105 yards and nine touchdowns. He also threw seven interceptions. In the offseason, Rodriguez signed quarterbacks Tate Forcier and Denard Robinson on National Signing Day. In February 2009, Threet announced his decision to transfer from the University of Michigan.

As a 6-foot, 6-inch traditional pocket passer, Threet had not fit into the Michigan offensive scheme under first-year head coach Rodriguez, whose spread offense emphasizes mobile quarterbacks. On announcing his transfer to Arizona State, Threet said:

"I like the pro-style offense and the coaching staff at Arizona State. My career has been filled with ups and downs and coaching changes aren't easy. I was at Georgia Tech for two weeks when they changed coaches. Michigan had the same coaches for like 30 years and then they change. When Coach [Lloyd] Carr retired I wanted to transfer, but I took Coach [Rich] Rodriguez at his word about the offense. I tried to stick it out. I tried to help Michigan win. But in the end the offense didn't fit me. They have a run first offense at every position. What they want is Pat White and that's not me."

=== Arizona State ===
In April 2009 Threet announced his decision to transfer to Arizona State University. Interviewed by The Michigan Daily, Threet explained his choice of Arizona State over Oregon State: "The first thing I looked at for any school I was going to go to was the offense they run and the coaching staff. Arizona State, I feel it fits me offensively with the type of offense they run, it's a pro-style offense. I get along very well with the coaching staff, I feel like they will be able to help me get better every day in practice and throughout the season and help me develop."

Under transfer rules Threet was required to sit out the 2009 season, but had two years of eligibility remaining.

In March 2010 Threet started for the first unit in Arizona State's spring game, though head coach, Dennis Erickson, said that that was only because Threet won a coin flip. At the time, Threet said, "I'm very excited, but I'm just a competitive person. Anytime I go out to practice, I'm trying to compete with whoever I'm playing against whether its last year on the scout team or this year trying to win the starting job."

Throughout August 2010 Threet was in close competition with Brock Osweiler for the starting quarterback position. In an interview with The Arizona Republic, head coach Dennis Erickson also praised Threet's progression: "Every quarterback I've been around it just takes awhile to get used to what you're hanging your hat on and what we're doing offensively. He's got a quick release, and he has a hell of an arm. He just needs to continue to get more accurate."

On August 30, 2010, Erickson announced that Threet would be the starting quarterback in the Sun Devils opening game against Portland State, saying that Threet "was the most consistent throughout fall camp."

In the season opener for Arizona State, Threet completed 14 of 21 passes for 239 yards and two touchdowns in a 54–9 win over Portland State. He also ran with the ball three times for 24 yards and garnered a passer rating of 184.17. His 239 passing yards were the most ever in a debut performance by an Arizona State quarterback.

In the second game of the 2010 season, Threet set career highs with 33 completions and 391 passing yards in a 41–20 win over Northern Arizona. He also threw three touchdown passes and two interceptions and completed passes to eight different receivers.

The next few games had their ups and downs for Threet, a close 20–19 loss at Camp Randall Stadium in Madison, started a downward spiral for the Sun Devils in 2010. In this game Threet went 21 of 33 for 211 yards.

Threet finished the 2010 season with 2,553 passing yards, 18 touchdowns and 16 interceptions.

On February 23, 2011, Threet announced his retirement from football due to repeated concussions.

== Coaching career ==
After Threet finished his playing career, he became a student assistant for Arizona State.
