= Chris Graham =

Chris Graham may refer to:

- Chris Graham (gridiron football)
- Chris Graham (boxer), Canadian boxer who competed in the 1920s
- Chris Graham (director), New Zealand film director

== See also ==
- Christopher Graham, UK Information Commissioner
