= Junior Hemingway =

American football player (born 1988)

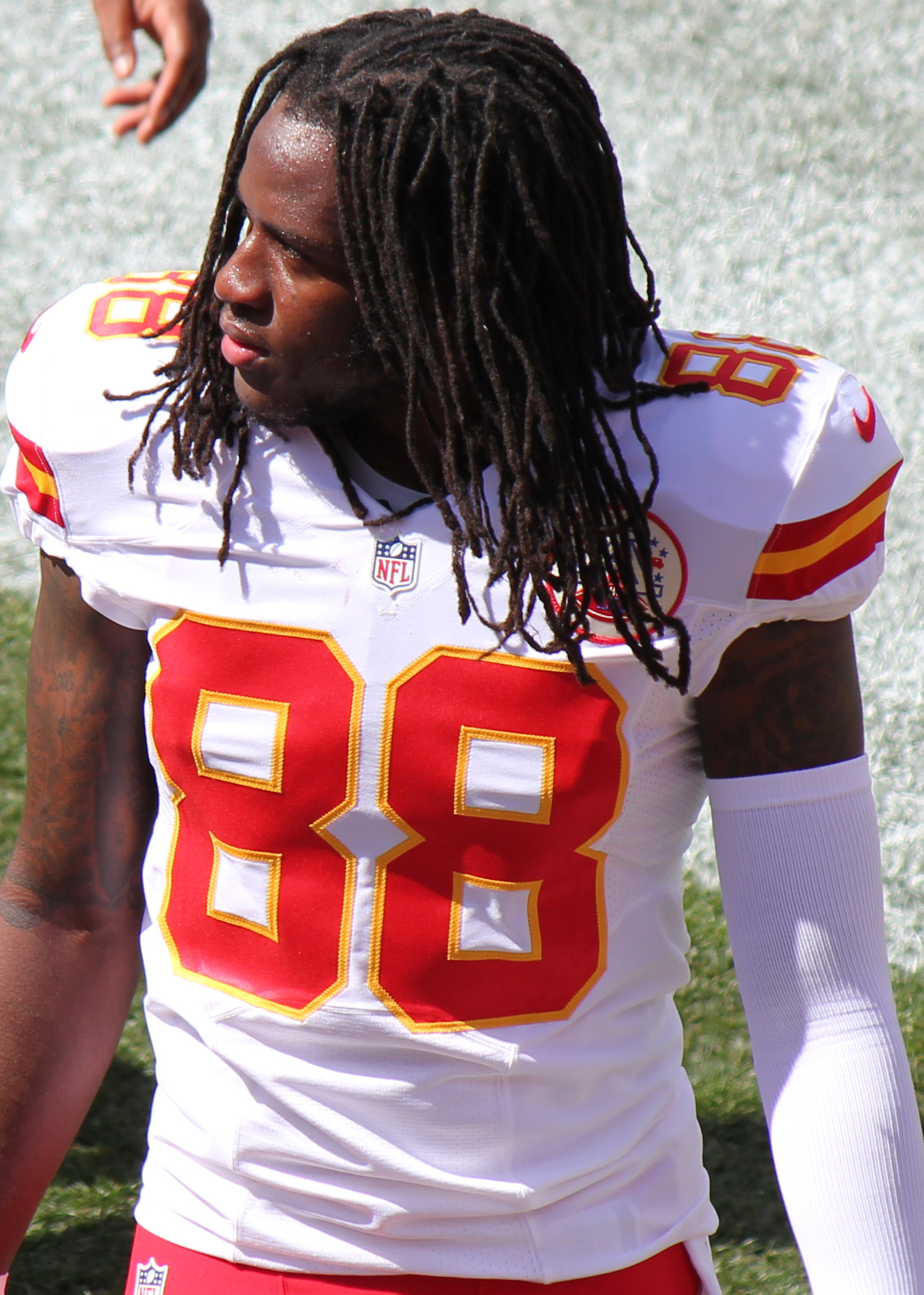
- Hemingway with the Kansas City Chiefs in 2014

No. 88
- Position: Wide receiver

Personal information
- Born: December 27, 1988 (age 37); Conway, South Carolina, U.S.
- Listed height: 6 ft 1 in (1.85 m)
- Listed weight: 225 lb (102 kg)

Career information
- High school: Conway
- College: Michigan
- NFL draft: 2012: 7th round, 238th overall pick

Career history
- Kansas City Chiefs (2012–2014)

Career NFL statistics
- Receptions: 25
- Receiving yards: 233
- Receiving touchdowns: 2
- Stats at Pro Football Reference

Kenneth Earl "Junior" Hemingway Jr. (born December 27, 1988) is an American former professional football player who was a wide receiver in the National Football League (NFL). He was selected by the Kansas City Chiefs in the 2012 NFL draft. He played college football for the Michigan Wolverines. As a redshirt senior in 2011, he led the Wolverines in receptions and receiving yards, and was tied for the lead in receiving touchdowns. Hemingway was the 2010 and 2011 Big Ten Conference leader in yards per reception, ranking third in all of Division I Football Bowl Subdivision as a senior. He received 2011 All-Big Ten honorable mention and was the 2012 Sugar Bowl Most Outstanding Player.

After totaling 593 receiving yards in 2010, Hemingway surpassed this yardage total in his senior season, finishing with a career-best 699 yards. The improvement resulted in Hemingway's league-leading 2010 average of 18.5 yards per reception improving to 20.6 yards per reception in 2011, which was the third-best average per catch in the nation (up from 15th in 2010).

== Early life ==
In high school, he was rated as the 4th, 26th and 38th best high school football wide receiver in the country by ESPN, Scout.com, and Rivals.com respectively. He was regarded as the 12th best player in the state of South Carolina by Rivals. ESPN rated him as the 19th best player in the national class of 2007, while Sports Illustrated regarded him as the 83rd best player in the class. Prior to his 2006 senior season, USA Today listed him as one of six players to watch in the state of South Carolina based on his 56 receptions for 846 yards and 10 touchdowns. He was the second highest rated recruit in Michigan's class of 2007 (behind Ryan Mallett) according to ESPN. He posted 12 receptions in the 2006 Class 4A Division 2 South Carolina High School League championship game against Greenwood High School. He participated in the North-South Game of the Carolinas.

College recruiting
Name	Hometown	School	Height	Weight	40^{‡}	Commit date
Junior Hemingway; WR	Conway, South Carolina	Conway (SC)	6 ft 2.25 in (1.89 m)	203.5 lb (92.3 kg)	4.5	Aug 24, 2006
Junior Hemingway; WR	Recruit ratings: Scout: Rivals: (84)					
Overall recruit ranking: Scout: 26 (WR) Rivals: 38 (WR), 12 (SC) ESPN: 4 (WR), 19 overall
Note: In many cases, Scout, Rivals, 247Sports, On3, and ESPN may conflict in their listings of height and weight.; In these cases, the average was taken. ESPN grades are on a 100-point scale.; Sources: "Michigan Football Commitments". Rivals.; "2007 Michigan Football Commits". Scout.; "ESPN". ESPN.; "Scout.com Team Recruiting Rankings". Scout.; "2007 Team Ranking". Rivals.com.

== College career ==
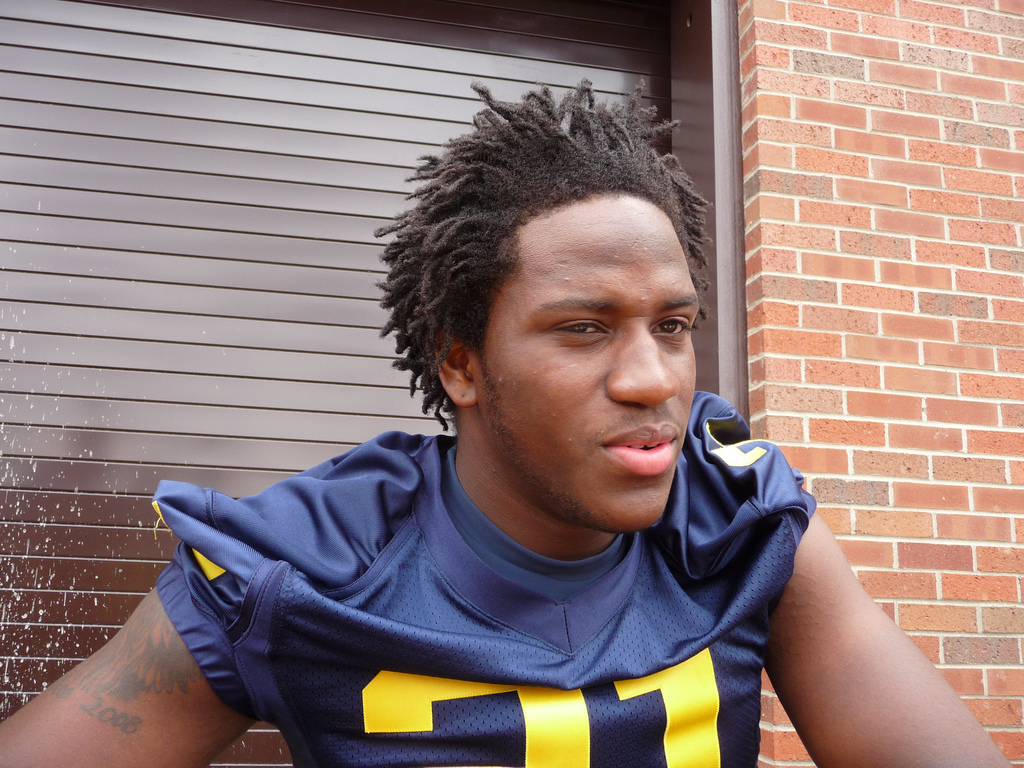
Hemingway during his time at the University of Michigan

As a true freshman on the 2007 Michigan team, he appeared in 10 games, making his first start September 22 against Penn State. His first receptions came during an October 6 game against Eastern Michigan when he recorded 3 catches for 33 yards. He also recorded a reception in the January 1, 2008 Capital One Bowl against the Florida Gators. He was limited as a true sophomore by mononucleosis which caused him to miss the final eight games of the season for the 2008 team, but did make one start. He received a medical redshirt as a result of the illness.

Hemingway posted his first 100-yard reception game, first two-touchdown performance and a career-high five-reception effort in the September 5 season opener for the 2009 team against Western Michigan, during his third career start. He missed the following week's rivalry game against Notre Dame due to an ankle sprain. In November, he played through back problems. As a redshirt sophomore, he totaled 16 receptions and 268 total yards from scrimmage as a receiver. He also served as a punt returner making 10 returns for 86 yards.

As a fourth-year junior for the 2010 Wolverines, he posted three 100-yard games and another two-touchdown performance. He did this despite missing the first two games of the season due to a hamstring injury as well as the November 27 regular season finale against Ohio State due to an injury. On October 2, his then career-high 129-yard, three-reception effort included a 70-yard touchdown on the second play of the second half which gave the team a 28–21 lead. It also included a 42-yard reception with 21 seconds left to put the ball on the four-yard-line before the game winning score on the next play in the 42–35 contest against Indiana. Two weeks later, he broke his career highs for both yards and receptions in a nine-catch 134-yard effort against Iowa. On November 6, he recorded 104 yards and two touchdowns in a six-catch performance against Illinois. For the season he totaled 593 yards on 32 receptions. This ranked third on the team behind Roy Roundtree and Darryl Stonum. However, he led the Big Ten Conference in yards/reception with an 18.5 average. This ranked him 15th in the nation.

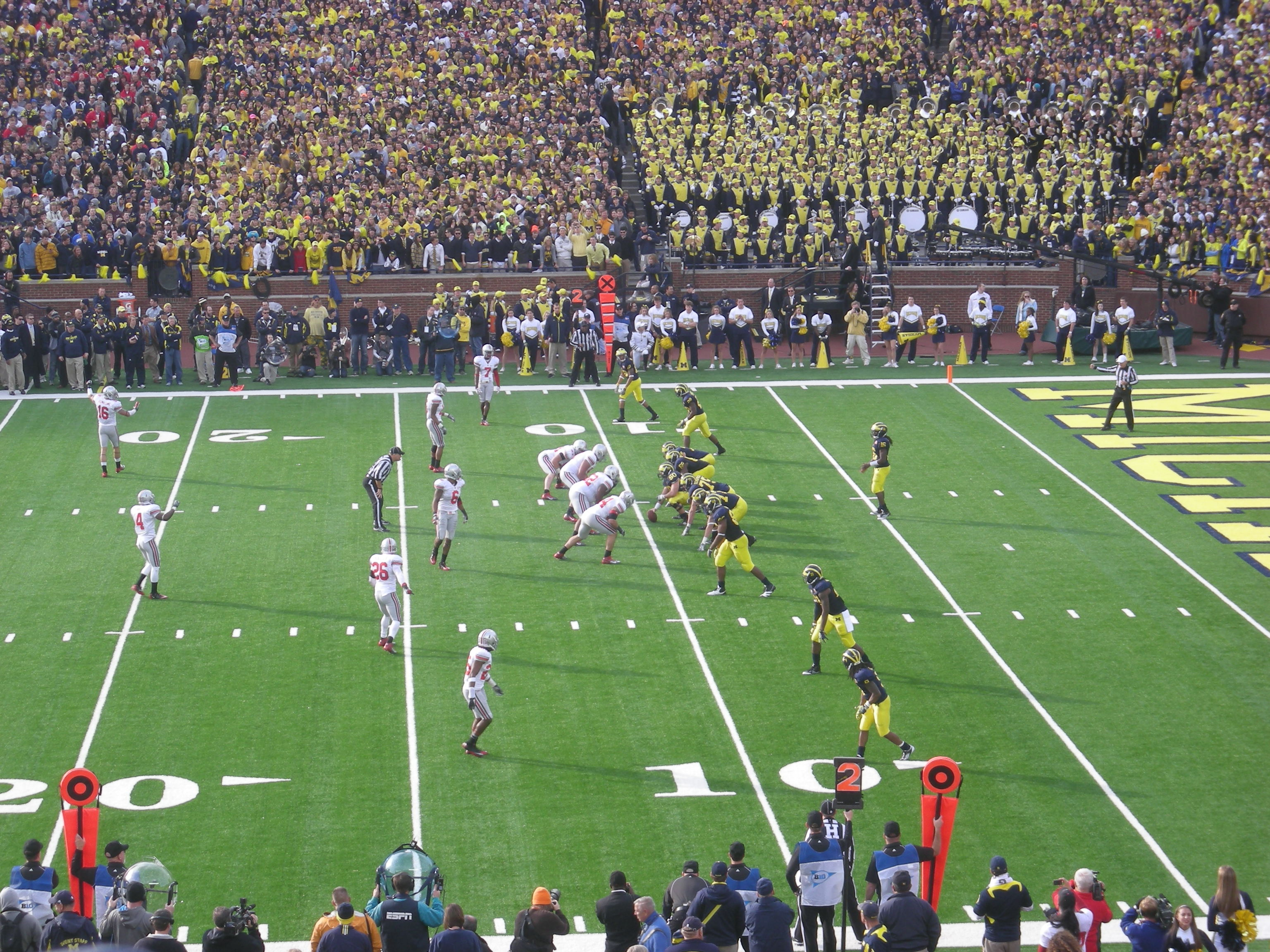
Hemingway in the near slot position during the 2011 Michigan-Ohio State rivalry game

When Brady Hoke replaced Rich Rodriguez as Michigan's head coach, AnnArbor.com predicted that Hemingway would be the biggest individual beneficiary on the team, as Hoke was expected to change the team's offensive schemes from the spread offense to a pro-style offense. He was also expected to help pick up the slack created by the full-season suspension of Stonum. As a fifth-year senior, he established a new career high on September 10, 2011, against Notre Dame in the rivalry game and during the first night game ever played at Michigan Stadium, when he recorded three receptions for 165 yards. Before the game, Desmond Howard, who had worn number 21 before Hemingway at Michigan, was honored for his enshrinement in the College Football Hall of Fame, and the jersey number was designated to be adorned with a "Desmond Howard: Michigan Legend" patch on the upper-right chest. On October 8, against the Northwestern, Hemingway had 5 receptions for a total of 124 yards. Following the 2011 Big Ten Conference football season, he earned All-Big Ten Conference honorable mention recognition from the coaches. In the January 3, 2012 Sugar Bowl, 23–20 overtime victory over Virginia Tech he recorded the team's only two touchdowns, earning 2012 Sugar Bowl Most Outstanding Player honors. He concluded the season with team highs of 34 receptions, 699 yards and four receiving touchdowns, giving him a conference leading 20.6 yards per reception. His receiving average ranked third in all of Division I FBS. Hemingway was invited to the January 21, 2012 East–West Shrine Game, and he was an early invite to the February 22 — 28, 2012 NFL Scouting Combine.

In the September 3, 2011 season opener against Western Michigan at Michigan Stadium, Hemingway recorded a 37-yard reception. The game was ended by mutual agreement in the third quarter due to inclement weather. At first, the stats for the game were considered official by the Big Ten Conference and the University of Michigan, but the NCAA vacated the statistics for this game because three quarters were not completed. However, at the conclusion of the regular season, the NCAA reversed course and announced that the statistics from the game would be counted in the season totals.

== Professional career ==
Hemingway was one of 47 wide receivers that participated in the February 22–28, 2012 NFL Scouting Combine. In the 3 cone drill with a time of 6.59, he ranked first among the wide receivers (26 participated in this event) and 3rd at the combine He ranked first among the wide receivers (26 participated in this event) and seventh overall in the 20-yard shuttle with a time of 3.98. He ranked second among wide receivers (13 participated in this event) and seventh overall in the 60-yard shuttle with a time of 11.16. He ranked 3rd among the wide receivers in the bench press with 21 reps. He ranked 8th among the wide receivers in the standing long jump with a distance of 10 feet 4 inches (3.15 m). His time of 4.53 ranked 19th of the 40 wide receivers who participated in the 40-yard dash.

Pre-draft measurables
Height	Weight	Arm length	Hand span	40-yard dash	10-yard split	20-yard split	20-yard shuttle	Three-cone drill	Vertical jump	Broad jump	Bench press
6 ft 0 7/8 in (1.85 m)	225 lb (102 kg)	32 1/2 in (0.83 m)	9 5/8 in (0.24 m)	4.53 s	1.57 s	2.61 s	3.98 s	6.59 s	35.5 in (0.90 m)	10 ft 4 in (3.15 m)	21 reps
All values from NFL Combine

He was selected by the Kansas City Chiefs in the seventh round of the 2012 NFL draft with the 238th selection overall. He is one of three Michigan Wolverines and 41 Big Ten players drafted. On May 11, 2012, he signed a four-year contract. On August 31, Hemingway was cut. He was initially signed to the practice squad but was released to make room for Rich Ranglin on September 3 before being resigned to replace Ranglin on September 8. On December 29 (the day before the last game of the 2012 NFL season), the Chiefs placed Terrance Copper on injured reserve and elevated Hemingway from injured reserve.

During the 2013 preseason, Hemingway led the Chiefs in receptions and touchdowns. He seemed to have moved into the fourth wide receiver position behind Dwayne Bowe, Donnie Avery, and Dexter McCluster. In the 2013 Chiefs season opener, he caught a touchdown against the Jacksonville Jaguars, who had his college freshman season quarterback Chad Henne and his redshirt senior season quarterback Denard Robinson on their roster. The reception, which came from Alex Smith, was Hemingway's first in the NFL. Hemingway had a three-reception game that included the game's opening score on December 1 against the Denver Broncos. In the final game of the season, he had 5 receptions for 45 yards, giving him 13 receptions and 125 yards for the season. Hemingway also posted 2 receptions for the Chiefs in the 2013–14 NFL playoffs against Indianapolis.

Hemingway injured his hamstring in week 7 of the 2014 NFL season against the San Diego Chargers on October 19. On September 1, 2015, the Chiefs cut Hemingway.

== Personal life ==
Hemingway is the older brother of Las Vegas Raiders defensive tackle, Tonka Hemingway.
