= Kenny Demens =

American football player (born 1990)

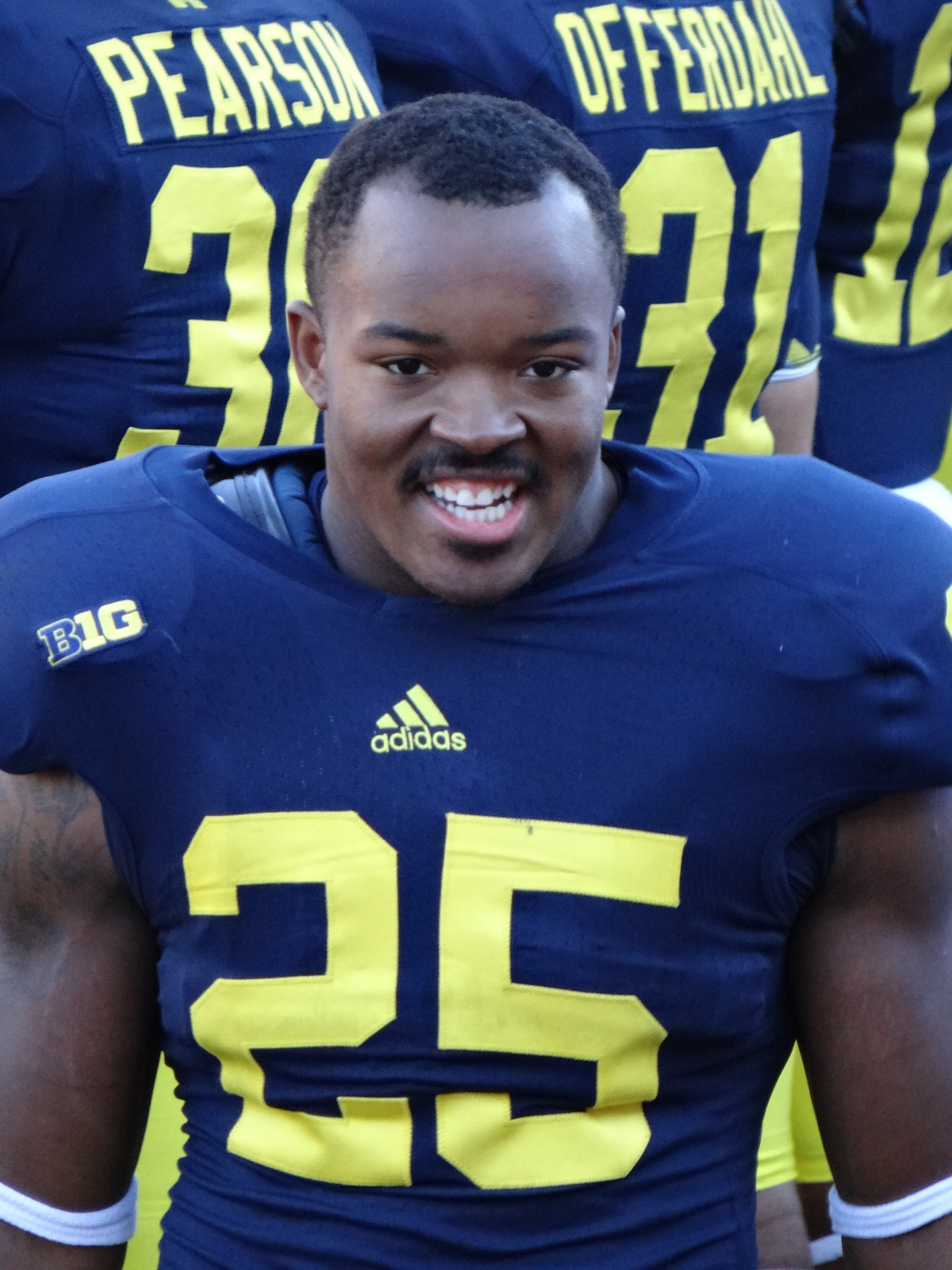
- Demens in 2012 at Michigan Stadium

No. 54
- Position: Outside linebacker

Personal information
- Born: February 4, 1990 (age 36); Detroit, Michigan, U.S.
- Listed height: 6 ft 1 in (1.85 m)
- Listed weight: 242 lb (110 kg)

Career information
- High school: Detroit Country Day School (Beverly Hills, Michigan)
- College: Michigan (2008–2012)
- NFL draft: 2013: undrafted

Career history
- Arizona Cardinals (2013–2015)

Career NFL statistics
- Total tackles: 15
- Forced fumbles: 1
- Stats at Pro Football Reference

Kenny Demens (born February 4, 1990) is an American former professional football player who was a linebacker for the Arizona Cardinals of the National Football League (NFL). He played college football for the Michigan Wolverines, playing his redshirt senior season in 2012. He was a 2011 honorable mention All-Big Ten Conference selection and the 2011 team leader in tackles. Demens spent the 2013 season on the Cardinals practice squad. In 2014, he began the season on the active roster. He had a season-ending injury in 2015 and was cut in 2016. During his NFL career, he mostly played special teams.

== Early life ==
Demens began playing football as an 8-year-old in Southfield, Michigan and attended Ron Rice's football camp for a few years as a youth.

Detroit Country Day reached the 2007 Michigan High School Athletic Association Division 4 State Championship game at Ford Field. Demens recorded 11 tackles in the game. Demens was close friends with classmate Jonas Gray. Demens was regarded as the 23rd, 23rd and 35th best high school football linebacker in the country as a senior by Scout.com, Rivals.com and ESPN.com, respectively. Rivals also ranked him as the eighth best high school football player in the state of Michigan.

College recruiting
Name	Hometown	School	Height	Weight	40^{‡}	Commit date
Kenny Demens; LB	Detroit, Michigan	Detroit Country Day (MI)	6 ft 1 in (1.85 m)	224.5 lb (101.8 kg)	4.6	Sep 29, 2007
Kenny Demens; LB	Recruit ratings: Scout: Rivals: (78)					
Overall recruit ranking: Scout: 23 (LB) Rivals: 23 (LB), 8 (MI) ESPN: 35 (LB)
Note: In many cases, Scout, Rivals, 247Sports, On3, and ESPN may conflict in their listings of height and weight.; In these cases, the average was taken. ESPN grades are on a 100-point scale.; Sources: "Michigan Football Commitments". Rivals.; "2008 Michigan Football Commits". Scout.; "ESPN". ESPN.; "Scout.com Team Recruiting Rankings". Scout.; "2008 Team Ranking". Rivals.com.

== College ==
Demens saw action as a true freshman in three games under first-year head coach Rich Rodriguez for the 2008 Wolverines.

Demens became a starter in the October 16 game against Iowa, and by the end of the season he recorded 10 tackles or more four times. He posted 12 tackles (5 solo and 7 assists) against Penn State on October 30, 10 tackles (5 solo and 5 assists) against Illinois on November 6, a career-high 13 (5 solo and 8 assists) against Wisconsin on November 20, and a career-high-tying 13 tackles (9 solo and 4 assists) against Mississippi State in the January 1, 2011 Gator Bowl.

Under new first-year head coach Brady Hoke, Demens led the 2011 Wolverines in tackles and recorded his first three (2 solo and 2 assists) quarterback sacks. His solo sacks came against Northwestern on October 8 and Illinois on November 12. He recorded ten or more tackles three times. He posted 12 tackles (8 solo and 4 assists) in the rivalry game against Notre Dame on September 10 in the first night game played at Michigan Stadium, 10 tackles (5 solo and 5 assists) against Northwestern on October 8 and 11 tackles (3 solo and 8 assists) against Iowa on November 5. He was an honorable mention 2011 All-Big Ten Conference selection by both the coaches and the media for the 2011 team. Demens led the team and finished among the conference leaders in tackles/game (7.2, t-13th).

In 2012, he finished second on the team to Jake Ryan in tackles. He concluded his career with 51 straight games played including 33 starts.

== Professional career ==
On April 29, 2013, following the 2013 NFL draft, Demens signed an undrafted free agent contract with the Arizona Cardinals for three years and $1,485,000. Demens survived the final roster cuts to make the 53-man roster, but when the Cardinals were awarded two waiver claims, they released Demens to make room on the roster. Although the Cardinals had three inside linebackers on the roster — Karlos Dansby, Jasper Brinkley, and rookie Kevin Minter — they added Demens to the practice squad.

In 2014, Demens began the season on the team's official active roster. On September 14, 2014, following a Ted Ginn Jr. 71-yard punt return touchdown, Demens covered a Chandler Catanzaro kickoff and forced a fumble by Quintin Demps of the New York Giants. Demens was lost for the season after an October 11 ACL injury for the 2015 Cardinals against the Detroit Lions. Demens was cut by the Cardinals prior to the 2016 season. During Demens' career he mostly played special teams, the only six snaps that he took on defense happened on September 9, 2013, when he posted his career–high three tackles in 19 plays on the field in a 13–10 win against the Tampa Bay Buccaneers.

== Personal life ==
He has a younger brother named Koreal.
