= Tim Jamison =

American football player (born 1986)

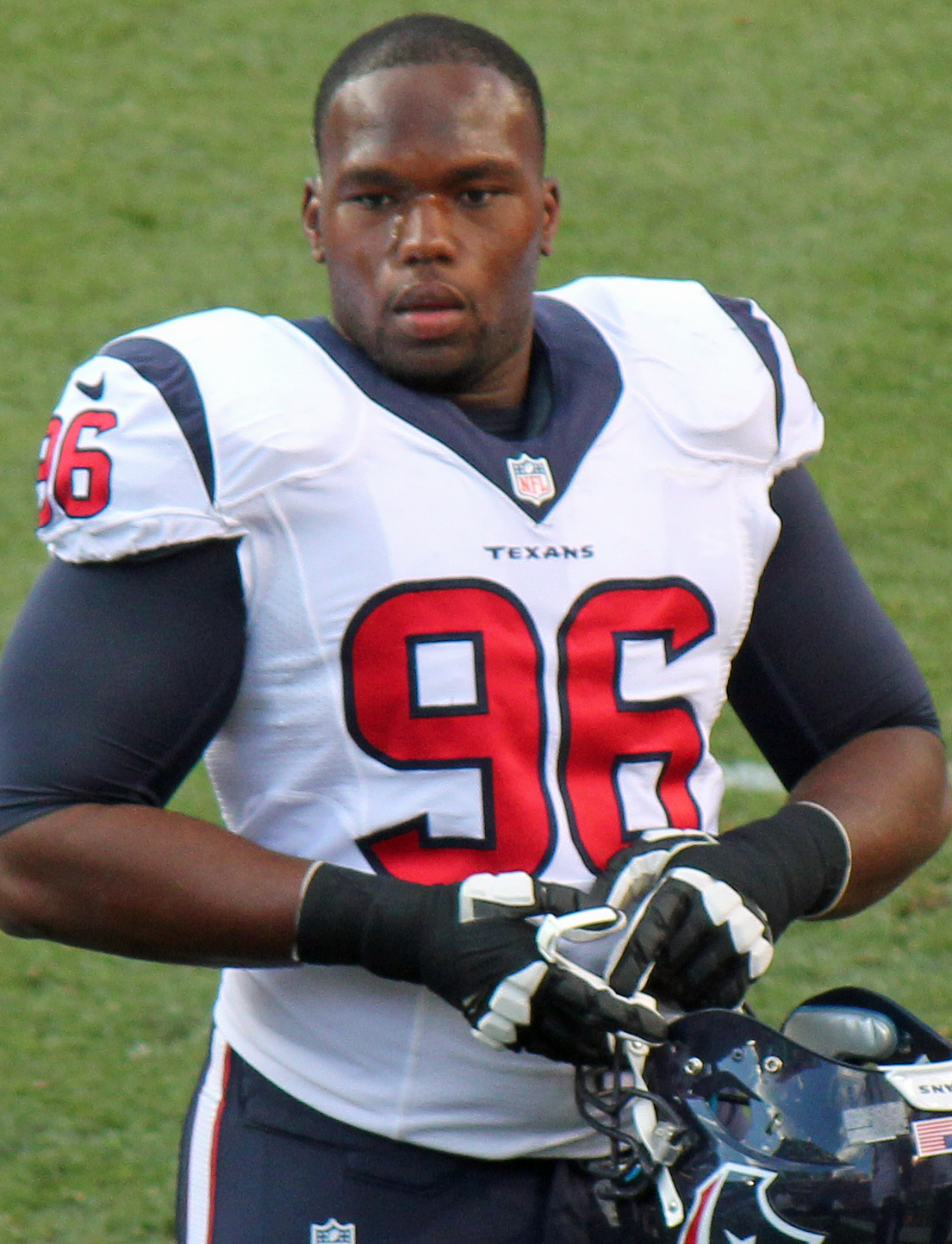
- Jamison with the Houston Texans in 2014

No. 96
- Position: Defensive end

Personal information
- Born: February 26, 1986 (age 40); Blue Island, Illinois, U.S.
- Listed height: 6 ft 3 in (1.91 m)
- Listed weight: 285 lb (129 kg)

Career information
- High school: Thornton Township (Harvey, Illinois)
- College: Michigan (2004–2008)
- NFL draft: 2009: undrafted

Career history
- Houston Texans (2009–2014)

Career NFL statistics
- Total tackles: 59
- Sacks: 5.5
- Forced fumbles: 1
- Stats at Pro Football Reference

Tim Jamison, II (born February 26, 1986) is an American former professional football player who was a defensive end in the National Football League (NFL). He played college football for the Michigan Wolverines.

== Early life ==
In his high school career, Jamison recorded 217 tackles (89 solo, 71 for losses), 45 sacks, and 14 forced fumbles. In his senior year, he recorded 89 tackles (31 for losses), 21 sacks, 14 quarterback hurries, three forced fumbles, recovered four fumbles, and defended 12 passes. Jamison was selected to play in the 2004 U.S. Army All-American Bowl in San Antonio, Texas.

== College career ==
=== 2004 ===
He enrolled in the University of Michigan and in his first season with the team he recorded four tackles before enduring a season-ending injury.

=== 2005 ===
Jamison made 10 tackles (4 for losses) in 10 games played, and 3 sacks. His first career sack was against Eastern Michigan University. At the end of the season, he was named to The Sporting News Freshman ALL-Big Ten team. He recorded a sack in the 2005 Alamo Bowl against the Nebraska Cornhuskers when he sacked Zac Taylor in which Michigan lost 28-32.

=== 2006 ===
He started the season in the depth chart as a backup defensive end to Rondell Biggs. He missed the season opener against Vanderbilt. He returned to see action against the Central Michigan Chippewas when he played as a backup. He recorded his first sack of the season when he sacked future Cleveland Browns quarterback Brady Quinn in the annual game against Notre Dame. He finished the season with 13 tackles and 5 sacks, including 3 tackles in the 2007 Rose Bowl.

=== 2007 ===
He started all 13 games at defensive end and was credited with 52 tackles (10 for losses), 5.5 sacks, 1 interception, 3 passes defended and two forced fumbles.

=== 2008 ===
As a fifth-year senior, he served as co-captain.

== Professional career ==
Jamison ran a 5.09 40 yard dash and did 21 reps on the bench press at the NFL Combine.

Jamison was signed as an undrafted free agent by the Texans.
