= Marell Evans =

American investor and entrepreneur (born 1989)

- Born: January 9, 1989 (age 37); Richmond, Virginia, U.S.
- Education: University of Michigan
- Occupations: Investor, Entrepreneur
- Known for: Funder of venture capital firm, Exceptional Capital

Marell Valdezze Evans (born January 9, 1989) is an American investor and entrepreneur. He is the founder of venture capital firm, Exceptional Capital, that is focused on early-stage enterprise software companies.

== Early life and education ==
Evans was born in Richmond, Virginia in 1989. He attended Varina High School. In 2007, Evans received a football scholarship at the University of Michigan where he played linebacker for the Michigan Wolverines.

== Career ==
Evans worked in enterprise and sales roles at IBM and Okta, he later joined SoftBank.

In 2021, he founded Exceptional Capital, a venture capital firm investing in enterprise software startups.

Evans has been featured in Forbes, Business Insider, and TechCrunch. He is a Kauffman Fellow.
