= Calvin Magee =

American football player and coach (1963–2022)

Biographical details
- Born: April 23, 1963; New Orleans, Louisiana, U.S.
- Died: May 20, 2022 (aged 59); Anniston, Alabama, U.S.
- Height: 6 ft 3 in (191 cm)
- Weight: 240 lb (110 kg; 17 st 2 lb)

Playing career
- 1981–1984: Southern
- 1985–1988: Tampa Bay Buccaneers
- Position: Tight end

Coaching career (HC unless noted)
- 1990–1995: Tampa Catholic HS (FL) (AHC/OC)
- 1996: South Florida (TE)
- 1997–1998: South Florida (RB)
- 1999–2000: South Florida (RGC/RB)
- 2001–2006: West Virginia (RB)
- 2005–2006: West Virginia (OC/RB)
- 2007: West Virginia (AHC/OC/RB)
- 2008–2010: Michigan (OC/RB)
- 2011: Pittsburgh (AHC/co-OC/RB)
- 2012–2017: Arizona (Assoc. HC/co-OC/RB)
- 2018: New Mexico (OC/RB)
- 2019: Ole Miss (TE)
- 2021: Duke (RB)
- 2022: Jacksonville State (AHC/OC/TE)

Calvin Magee (April 23, 1963 – May 20, 2022) was an American professional football player and college football coach. He played tight end for four seasons for the Tampa Bay Buccaneers of the National Football League (NFL) from 1985 to 1988.

Shortly after a high school coaching career around the Tampa area, Calvin was a member of the University of South Florida's first coaching staff in 1996 where he remained until 2001 when he joined Rich Rodriguez's staff at West Virginia University. Magee followed Rodriguez to the University of Michigan in 2008, where he served as offensive coordinator until Rodriguez and his staff were fired after the 2010 season.

Rodriguez is widely credited with innovating the spread option offense, which Magee managed at West Virginia and Michigan. This offense is used by thousands of high schools and other collegiate programs throughout the country. Magee was a finalist for the Broyles Award in 2007, given to the top college assistant coach.

Following Rich Rodriguez's termination as Michigan's head football coach, Magee joined Todd Graham's staff on the Pittsburgh Panthers football team. He served as offensive coordinator for the 2011 season.

On December 5, 2011, Rich Rodriguez announced that Magee would join his staff at the University of Arizona as offensive coordinator. He was also the running backs coach.

On January 20, 2018, Magee became the offensive coordinator and running backs coach at the University of New Mexico.

On January 2, 2019, Magee became the tight ends coach at the University of Mississippi.

Magee died on May 20, 2022, following a heart attack.
