= Chris Graham (gridiron football) =

American gridiron football player (born 1984)

Profile
- Position: Linebacker / Fullback

Personal information
- Born: September 30, 1984 (age 42); Indianapolis, Indiana, U.S.
- Listed height: 5 ft 11 in (1.80 m)
- Listed weight: 235 lb (107 kg)

Career information
- High school: Indianapolis (IN) Warren Central
- College: Michigan
- NFL draft: 2008: undrafted

Career history
- New Orleans Saints (2008)*; Detroit Lions (2008–2009)*; Braunschweig Lions (2010); Pittsburgh Power (2011); Saskatchewan Roughriders (2011)
- * Offseason or practice squad member only

Chris De'monte Graham (born September 30, 1984) is an American former professional football linebacker. He was signed by the New Orleans Saints as an undrafted free agent in 2008. He played college football at Michigan.

Graham was also a member of the Detroit Lions of the NFL, the Pittsburgh Power of the Arena Football League, the Braunschweig Lions of the German Football League, and the Saskatchewan Roughriders of the Canadian Football League.

== Early life ==
Graham played most of his high school football at Warren Central High School in Indianapolis. He was an all-state linebacker in Indiana and led his team to a state championship while setting a record for number of tackles in a season (180). In his senior year, he also recorded 19 tackles for loss (TFL), four sacks, one interception, and one defensive touchdown. He was a four-star recruit and had offers from Tennessee, Michigan, Purdue, Indiana, and Kentucky.

== College career ==
Graham held offers from numerous top D1 programs but ultimately chose to play his college ball at the University of Michigan under Lloyd Carr. He played alongside players such as David Harris, Lamarr Woodley, Leon Hall, Jake Long, Chad Henne, and Braylon Edwards. He played in games as a true freshman, and got his first start as a sophomore against Northern Illinois where he recorded 10 tackles including 2 TFLs. Graham was a four-year letterman and appeared in 46 career games and made 20 starts at linebacker. He contributed 163 stops, 11 tackles for loss, one sack, two fumble recovery and six pass breakups during career. In his senior year, he won the 2007 Roger Zatkoff Award as Michigan's top linebacker. He was also received All-Big Ten Honorable Mention voted on by the Big Ten Media.

== Professional career ==
Graham was projected to be drafted in the late rounds of the 2008 NFL draft, however he went undrafted. He was then signed by the New Orleans Saints, but was eventually released. After trying out for four teams Graham was signed by the Detroit Lions. He was first signed to the practice squad and then made roster for the entire offseason but released before preseason. After being released from Lions middle linebacker Graham decided to return to the University of Michigan to finish his degree in general studies.

In 2010, Graham was signed and played for the Braunschweig Lions of the German Football League.

Graham signed with the Pittsburgh Power of the Arena Football League and played with them during the 2011 season.

Graham left the Power and signed with the Saskatchewan Roughriders of the Canadian Football League and was placed on the Developmental Squad following training camp. Graham was placed on the active roster periodically during the 2011 CFL season, starting three games at middle linebacker. He was projected as the starting middle linebacker for the 2012 season, but was released on June 17, 2012, after the Roughriders chose to use a non-import player at that position.
