= USA Today All-USA High School Football Team (2000–2009) =

USA Today named its first All-USA High School Football Team in 1982. The newspaper has named a team every year since 1982.

In addition, two members of the team are named the USA Today High School Offensive Player and Defensive Player of the Year, respectively. The newspaper also selects a USA Today High School Football Coach of the Year.

== Teams ==
=== 2000 team ===
Coach of the Year: Tony Severino (Rockhurst High School, Kansas City, Missouri)

Note: Bold denotes Offensive and Defensive Players of the Year, respectively, and ^{‡} denotes high school juniors

Offense

| Player | Position | School | Hometown | College |
|---|---|---|---|---|
| **Joe Mauer** | **Quarterback** | **Cretin-Derham Hall High School** | St. Paul, Minnesota | Florida State (Note: Mauer was selected first overall by the Minnesota Twins in the 2001 Major League Baseball draft, and signed a contract to play in the Twins organization. He made the Twins' major-league roster in 2004 and played for the team until retiring after the 2018 season, appearing in six All-Star Games and being named American League MVP in 2009.) |
| Kevin Jones | Running back | Cardinal O'Hara High School | Springfield, Pennsylvania | Virginia Tech |
| Eric Shelton | Running back | Bryan Station High School | Lexington, Kentucky | Louisville |
| Blake Larsen | Offensive line | Atlantic High School | Atlantic, Iowa | Iowa |
| Ben Wilkerson | Offensive line | Hemphill High School | Hemphill, Texas | LSU |
| Andrew Whitworth | Offensive line | West Monroe High School | West Monroe, Louisiana | LSU |
| Chris Spencer | Offensive line | Central High School | Madison, Mississippi | Ole Miss |
| Reggie Williams | Wide receiver | Lakes High School | Lakewood, Washington | Washington |
| Roscoe Crosby | Wide receiver | Union High School | Union, South Carolina | Clemson |
| Mark LeVoir | Tight end | Eden Prairie High School | Eden Prairie, Minnesota | Notre Dame |
| Kelly Baraka | Athlete | Northern High School | Portage, Michigan | Michigan |
| Mike McLaughlin | Placekicker | Gautier High School | Gautier, Mississippi | Alabama |

Defense

| Player | Position | School | Hometown | College |
|---|---|---|---|---|
| **Shaun Cody** | **Defensive line** | **Los Altos High School** | Hacienda Heights, California | USC |
| Tommie Harris | Defensive line | Ellison High School | Killeen, Texas | Oklahoma |
| Marquise Hill | Defensive line | De La Salle High School | New Orleans, Louisiana | LSU |
| Anttaj Hawthorne | Defensive line | Hamden High School | Hamden, Connecticut | Wisconsin |
| Michael-Jordan Craven | Linebacker | La Quinta High School | La Quinta, California | Stanford |
| Kevin Simon | Linebacker | De La Salle High School | Concord, California | Tennessee |
| Leon Williams | Linebacker | Canarsie High School | Brooklyn, New York | Miami (FL) |
| Ernest Shazor | Defensive back | Martin Luther King High School | Detroit, Michigan | Michigan |
| Matt Ware | Defensive back | Loyola High School | Los Angeles, California | UCLA |
| Marlin Jackson | Defensive back | Sharon High School | Sharon, Pennsylvania | Michigan |
| Antrel Rolle | Defensive back | South Dade High School | Homestead, Florida | Miami (FL) |
| Ryan Wimberley | Punter | Houston High School | Houston, Missouri | Oklahoma State |

=== 2001 team ===
Coach of the Year: Bob Ladouceur (De La Salle High School, Concord, California)

Note: Bold denotes Offensive and Defensive Players of the Year, respectively, and ^{‡} denotes high school juniors

Offense

| Player | Position | School | Hometown | College |
|---|---|---|---|---|
| **Maurice Clarett** | **Running back** | **Warren Harding High School** | Warren, Ohio | Ohio State |
| Ben Olson | Quarterback | Thousand Oaks High School | Thousand Oaks, California | BYU |
| J. R. Zwierzynski | Running back | Catholic Academy | Joliet, Illinois | Penn State |
| Justin Blalock | Offensive line | East High School | Plano, Texas | Texas |
| Derek Landri | Offensive line | De La Salle High School | Concord, California | Notre Dame |
| Derek Morris | Offensive line | North Mecklenburg High School | Huntersville, North Carolina | North Carolina State |
| Rob Smith | Offensive line | Highlands High School | Fort Thomas, Kentucky | Tennessee |
| Eric Winston | Tight end | Lee High School | Midland, Texas | Miami (FL) |
| Maurice Stovall | Wide receiver | Archbishop Carroll High School | Radnor, Pennsylvania | Notre Dame |
| Ryan Moore | Wide receiver | Dr. Phillips High School | Orlando, Florida | Miami (FL) |
| Lorenzo Booker | Athlete | St. Bonaventure High School | Ventura, California | Florida State |
| Erik Hinterbichler | Placekicker | Albuquerque High School | Albuquerque, New Mexico | Dartmouth |

Defense

| Player | Position | School | Hometown | College |
|---|---|---|---|---|
| **Ahmad Brooks** | **Linebacker** | **Hylton High School** | Woodbridge, Virginia | Virginia |
| Haloti Ngata | Defensive line | Highland High School | Salt Lake City, Utah | Oregon |
| Rodrique Wright | Defensive line | Hastings High School | Alief, Texas | Texas |
| Larry Dibbles | Defensive line | Lancaster High School | Lancaster, Texas | Texas |
| Kai Parham | Defensive line | Princess Anne High School | Virginia Beach, Virginia | Virginia |
| David Richard | Linebacker | Hazelwood East High School | Hazelwood, Missouri | Michigan State |
| Mike D'Andrea | Linebacker | Avon Lake High School | Avon Lake, Ohio | Ohio State |
| Pat Watkins | Defensive back | Lincoln High School | Tallahassee, Florida | Florida State |
| William Blackmon | Defensive back | Bishop Hendricken High School | Warwick, Rhode Island | Boston College |
| Buster Davis | Defensive back | Mainland High School | Daytona Beach, Florida | Florida State |
| A. J. Davis | Defensive back | Northern High School | Durham, North Carolina | North Carolina State |
| Danny Baugher | Punter | Mountain Pointe High School | Phoenix, Arizona | Arizona |

=== 2002 team ===
Coach of the Year: Bob Ladouceur (De La Salle High School, Concord, California)

Note: Bold denotes Offensive and Defensive Players of the Year, respectively, and ^{‡} denotes high school juniors

Offense

| Player | Position | School | Hometown | College |
|---|---|---|---|---|
| **Chris Leak** | **Quarterback** | **Independence High School** | Charlotte, North Carolina | Florida |
| Reggie Bush | Running back | Helix High School | La Mesa, California | USC |
| Demetris Summers | Running back | Lexington High School | Lexington, South Carolina | South Carolina |
| Jorrie Adams | Offensive line | Jasper High School | Jasper, Texas | Texas A&M |
| Ofa Mohetau | Offensive line | Trinity High School | Euless, Texas | BYU |
| Ryan Harris | Offensive line | Cretin-Derham Hall High School | Saint Paul, Minnesota | Notre Dame |
| Mike Jones | Offensive line | Richards High School | Oak Lawn, Illinois | Iowa |
| Greg Olsen | Tight end | Wayne Hills High School | Wayne, New Jersey | Miami (FL) |
| Sean Bailey | Wide receiver | Milton High School | Alpharetta, Georgia | Georgia |
| Steve Smith | Wide receiver | Taft High School | Woodland Hills, California | USC |
| Tom Zbikowski | Athlete | Buffalo Grove High School | Buffalo Grove, Illinois | Notre Dame |
| Chase Goggans | Placekicker | Coffee High School | Douglas, Georgia | Florida State |

Defense

| Player | Position | School | Hometown | College |
|---|---|---|---|---|
| **Antonio Cromartie** | **Defensive back** | **Lincoln High School** | Tallahassee, Florida | Florida State |
| Jarvis Moss | Defensive line | Ryan High School | Denton, Texas | Florida |
| Victor Abiamiri | Defensive line | Gilman School | Baltimore, Maryland | Notre Dame |
| Xavier Lawson-Kennedy | Defensive line | Duncanville High School | Duncanville, Texas | Oklahoma State |
| Trevor Laws | Defensive line | Apple Valley High School | Apple Valley, Minnesota | Notre Dame |
| Wesley Jefferson | Linebacker | Gwynn Park High School | Brandywine, Maryland | Maryland |
| Daniel Brooks | Linebacker | Central Merry High School | Jackson, Tennessee | Tennessee |
| LaMarr Woodley | Linebacker | Saginaw High School | Saginaw, Michigan | Michigan |
| Michael Bush | Defensive back | Male High School | Louisville, Kentucky | Louisville |
| Tarell Brown | Defensive back | North Mesquite High School | Mesquite, Texas | Texas |
| Demetrice Webb | Defensive back | White High School | Jacksonville, Florida | Florida |
| Cody Freeby | Punter | Fort Worth Christian School | North Richland Hills, Texas | Oklahoma |

=== 2003 team ===
Coach of the Year: Bob Ladouceur (De La Salle High School, Concord, California)

Note: Bold denotes Offensive and Defensive Players of the Year, respectively, and ^{‡} denotes high school juniors

Offense

| Player | Position | School | Hometown | College |
|---|---|---|---|---|
| **Brian Brohm** | **Quarterback** | **Trinity High School** | Louisville, Kentucky | Louisville |
| Adrian Peterson | Running back | Palestine High School | Palestine, Texas | Oklahoma |
| Joe Casey | Running back | Paducah Tilghman High School | Paducah, Kentucky | Kentucky |
| Jeff Byers | Offensive line | Loveland High School | Loveland, Colorado | USC |
| Kyle Mitchum | Offensive line | McDowell High School | Erie, Pennsylvania | Ohio State |
| Roland Martin | Offensive line | Harper High School | Chicago, Illinois | Michigan State |
| Leon Hart | Offensive line | Spring Valley High School | Columbia, South Carolina | Auburn |
| Aaron Klovas | Offensive line | Bethel High School | Spanaway, Washington | Oregon |
| Brian Toal | Athlete | Don Bosco Preparatory High School | Ramsey, New Jersey | Boston College |
| Zach Miller | Tight end | Desert Vista High School | Phoenix, Arizona | Arizona State |
| Xavier Carter | Wide receiver | Palm Bay High School | Palm Bay, Florida | LSU |
| Connor Barth | Placekicker | Hoggard High School | Wilmington, North Carolina | North Carolina |

Defense

| Player | Position | School | Hometown | College |
|---|---|---|---|---|
| **Ted Ginn Jr.** | **Defensive back** | **Glenville High School** | Cleveland, Ohio | Ohio State |
| Demonte Bolden | Defensive line | Tyner Academy | Chattanooga, Tennessee | Tennessee |
| Jeff Schweiger | Defensive line | Valley Christian High School | San Jose, California | USC |
| Marlon Favorite | Defensive line | West Jefferson High School | Harvey, Louisiana | LSU |
| DeMario Pressley | Defensive line | Dudley High School | Greensboro, North Carolina | North Carolina State |
| Willie Williams | Linebacker | Carol City High School | Carol City, Florida | Miami (FL) |
| Keith Rivers | Linebacker | Lake Mary High School | Lake Mary, Florida | USC |
| Dan Connor | Linebacker | Strath Haven High School | Wallingford, Pennsylvania | Penn State |
| James Bryant | Linebacker | Reading High School | Reading, Pennsylvania | Miami (FL) |
| Simeon Castille | Defensive back | Briarwood Christian High School | Birmingham, Alabama | Alabama |
| Tony Carter | Defensive back | Mandarin High School | Jacksonville, Florida | Florida State |
| Ryan Burks | Punter | Decatur High School | Federal Way, Washington | Eastern Washington |

=== 2004 team ===
Coach of the Year: Todd Dodge (Carroll High School, Southlake, Texas)

Note: Bold denotes Offensive and Defensive Players of the Year, respectively, and ^{‡} denotes high school juniors

First Team Offense

| Player | Position | School | Hometown | College |
|---|---|---|---|---|
| **Ryan Perriloux** | **Quarterback** | **East St. John High School** | Reserve, Louisiana | LSU |
| Jonathan Stewart | Running back | Timberline High School | Lacey, Washington | Oregon |
| Toney Baker | Running back | Ragsdale High School | Jamestown, North Carolina | North Carolina State |
| Dan Doering | Offensive line | Barrington High School | Barrington, Illinois | Iowa |
| Eugene Monroe | Offensive line | Plainfield High School | Plainfield, New Jersey | Virginia |
| Alex Boone | Offensive line | St. Edward High School | Lakewood, Ohio | Ohio State |
| Reggie Youngblood | Offensive line | Booker T. Washington High School | Houston, Texas | Miami (FL) |
| Michael Oher | Offensive line | Briarcrest Christian School | Memphis, Tennessee | Mississippi |
| Reggie Smith | Athlete | Santa Fe High School | Edmond, Oklahoma | Oklahoma |
| Martellus Bennett | Tight end | Alief Taylor High School | Alief, Texas | Texas A&M |
| Fred Rouse | Wide receiver | Lincoln High School | Tallahassee, Florida | Florida State |
| Graham Gano | Placekicker | Tate High School | Cantonment, Florida | Florida State |

First Team Defense

| Player | Position | School | Hometown | College |
|---|---|---|---|---|
| **Kenny Phillips** | **Defensive back** | **Carol City High School** | Miami, Florida | Miami (FL) |
| DeMarcus Granger | Defensive line | Kimball High School | Dallas, Texas | Oklahoma |
| Jerrell Powe | Defensive line | Wayne County High School | Waynesboro, Mississippi | Mississippi |
| Kyle Moore | Defensive line | Houston County High School | Warner Robins, Georgia | USC |
| Melvin Alaeze | Defensive line | Randallstown High School | Randallstown, Maryland | Maryland |
| Travis Beckum | Linebacker | Oak Creek High School | Oak Creek, Wisconsin | Wisconsin |
| Rey Maualuga | Linebacker | Eureka High School | Eureka, California | USC |
| Ryan Reynolds | Linebacker | Bishop Gorman High School | Las Vegas, Nevada | Oklahoma |
| Brian Cushing | Linebacker | Bergen Catholic High School | Oradell, New Jersey | USC |
| Justin King | Defensive back | Gateway High School | Monroeville, Pennsylvania | Penn State |
| Demetrice Morley | Defensive back | Killian High School | Miami, Florida | Tennessee |
| Justin Brantly | Punter | Sealy High School | Sealy, Texas | Texas A&M |

Second Team Offense

| Player | Position | School | Hometown | College |
|---|---|---|---|---|
| Greg Paulus | Quarterback | Christian Brothers Academy | Syracuse, New York | Syracuse |
| Kevin Grady | Running Back | East Grand Rapids High School | Grand Rapids, Michigan | Michigan |
| Marlon Lucky | Running Back | North Hollywood High School | North Hollywood, California | Nebraska |
| Rodney Picou | Offensive Line | Canyon Springs High School | Moreno Valley, California | Nebraska |
| Josh McNeil | Offensive Line | Collins High School | Collins, Mississippi | Tennessee |
| Dace Richardson | Offensive Line | Wheaton Warrenville South High School | Wheaton, Illinois | Iowa |
| Chris Scott | Offensive Line | Lovejoy High School | Lovejoy, Georgia | Tennessee |
| Matt Hardrick | Offensive Line | Edgewater High School | Orlando, Florida | Florida State |
| Patrick Turner | Wide receiver | Goodpasture Christian High School | Madison, Tennessee | USC |
| Anthony Moeaki | Tight end | Wheaton Warrenville South High School | Wheaton, Illinois | Iowa |
| Derrick Williams | Athlete | Eleanor Roosevelt High School | Greenbelt, Maryland | Penn State |
| Jordan Congdon | Placekicker | St. Augustine High School | San Diego, California | USC |

Second Team Defense

| Player | Position | School | Hometown | College |
|---|---|---|---|---|
| Barry Turner | Defensive Line | Brentwood Academy | Brentwood, Tennessee | Nebraska |
| Henry Melton | Defensive Line | Grapevine High School | Grapevine, Texas | Texas |
| Averell Spicer | Defensive Line | Rancho Cucamonga High School | Rancho Cucamonga, California | USC |
| Spencer Adkins | Defensive Line | Naples High School | Naples, Florida | Miami (FL) |
| Derek Nicholson | Linebacker | Mount Tabor High School | Winston-Salem, North Carolina | Florida State |
| Tray Blackmon | Linebacker | LaGrange High School | LaGrange, Georgia | Auburn |
| Eugene Hayes | Linebacker | Madison County High School | Madison, Florida | Florida State |
| Ricardo McCoy | Linebacker | St. John's High School | Washington, D.C. | Tennessee |
| Victor Harris | Defensive Back | Highland Springs High School | Highland Springs, Virginia | Virginia Tech |
| Bryan Evans | Defensive Back | Ed White High School | Jacksonville, Florida | Georgia |
| R.J. Jackson | Defensive Back | Westside High School | Houston, Texas | LSU |
| Zoltan Mesko | Punter | Twinsburg High School | Twinsburg, Ohio | Michigan |

=== 2005 team ===
Coach of the Year: Bill Castle (Lakeland High School, Lakeland, Florida)

Note: Bold denotes Offensive and Defensive Players of the Year, respectively, and ^{‡} denotes high school juniors

First Team Offense

| Player | Position | School | Hometown | College |
|---|---|---|---|---|
| **Mitch Mustain** | **Quarterback** | **Springdale High School** | Springdale, Arkansas | Arkansas |
| Chris Wells | Running back | Garfield High School | Akron, Ohio | Ohio State |
| C. J. Spiller | Running back | Union County High School | Lake Butler, Florida | Clemson |
| Sam Young | Offensive line | St. Thomas Aquinas High School | Fort Lauderdale, Florida | Notre Dame |
| Andre Smith | Offensive line | Huffman High School | Birmingham, Alabama | Alabama |
| Justin Anderson | Offensive line | Irwin County High School | Ocilla, Georgia | Georgia |
| Jake Bscherer | Offensive line | Sturgeon Bay High School | Sturgeon Bay, Wisconsin | Wisconsin |
| Carl Johnson | Offensive line | Southern High School | Durham, North Carolina | Florida |
| Percy Harvin | Athlete | Landstown High School | Virginia Beach, Virginia | Florida |
| David Ausberry | Wide receiver | Lemoore High School | Lemoore, California | USC |
| Konrad Reuland | Tight end | Mission Viejo High School | Mission Viejo, California | Notre Dame |
| Kai Forbath | Placekicker | Notre Dame High School | Sherman Oaks, California | UCLA |

First Team Defense

| Player | Position | School | Hometown | College |
|---|---|---|---|---|
| **Gerald McCoy** | **Defensive line** | **Southeast High School** | Oklahoma City, Oklahoma | Oklahoma |
| Ricky Sapp | Defensive line | Bamberg-Ehrhardt High School | Bamberg, South Carolina | Clemson |
| Jared Odrick | Defensive line | Lebanon High School | Lebanon, Pennsylvania | Penn State |
| Eddie Jones | Defensive line | Kilgore High School | Kilgore, Texas | Texas |
| Sergio Kindle | Linebacker | Woodrow Wilson High School | Dallas, Texas | Texas |
| Brandon Graham | Linebacker | Crockett High School | Detroit, Michigan | Michigan |
| Allen Bradford | Linebacker | Colton High School | Colton, California | USC |
| Akeem Hebron | Linebacker | Good Counsel High School | Wheaton, Maryland | Georgia |
| Taylor Mays | Defensive back | O'Dea High School | Seattle, Washington | USC |
| Jonas Mouton | Defensive back | Venice High School | Venice, California | Michigan |
| Antwine Perez | Defensive back | Woodrow Wilson High School | Camden, New Jersey | USC/Maryland |
| Ryan Donahue | Punter | St. Rita High School | Chicago, Illinois | Iowa |

Second Team Offense

| Player | Position | School | Hometown | College |
|---|---|---|---|---|
| Jimmy Clausen^{‡} | Quarterback | Oaks Christian High School | Westlake Village, California | Notre Dame |
| Stafon Johnson | Running back | Dorsey High School | Los Angeles, California | USC |
| Michael Goodson | Running back | Klein Collins High School | Klein, Texas | Texas A&M |
| J'Marcus Webb | Offensive line | North Mesquite High School | Mesquite, Texas | Texas |
| Chris Stewart | Offensive line | Klein High School | Klein, Texas | Notre Dame |
| Steve Schilling | Offensive line | Bellevue High School | Bellevue, Washington | Michigan |
| Matt Carufel | Offensive line | Cretin-Derham Hall High School | St. Paul, Minnesota | Notre Dame |
| Jacques McClendon | Offensive line | Baylor Prep | Chattanooga, Tennessee | Tennessee |
| Jarred Fayson | Athlete | Hillsborough High School | Tampa, Florida | Florida/Illinois |
| Sam Shields | Wide receiver | Booker High School | Sarasota, Florida | Miami (FL) |
| Jamie Cumbie | Tight end | Morris High School | Morris, Illinois | Clemson |
| Jimmy Stevens^{‡} | Placekicker | Heritage Hall School | Oklahoma City, Oklahoma | Oklahoma |

Second Team Defense

| Player | Position | School | Hometown | College |
|---|---|---|---|---|
| Clifton Geathers | Defensive line | Georgetown High School | Georgetown, South Carolina | South Carolina |
| Al Woods | Defensive line | Elton High School | Elton, Louisiana | LSU |
| Marcus Tillman | Defensive line | Franklin County High School | Meadville, Mississippi | Mississippi |
| Butch Lewis | Defensive line | Regis Jesuit High School | Aurora, Colorado | USC |
| Thaddeus Gibson | Linebacker | Euclid High School | Euclid, Ohio | Ohio State |
| Marcus Ball | Linebacker | Stephenson High School | Stone Mountain, Georgia | Florida State |
| Toryan Smith | Linebacker | Rome High School | Rome, Georgia | Notre Dame |
| Jeremiha Hunter | Linebacker | Harrisburg High School | Harrisburg, Pennsylvania | Iowa |
| Darrin Walls | Defensive back | Woodland Hills High School | Pittsburgh, Pennsylvania | Notre Dame |
| A.J. Wallace | Defensive back | McDonough High School | Pomfret, Maryland | Penn State |
| LaRon Moore | Defensive back | Midwest City High School | Midwest City, Oklahoma | Texas Tech |
| Brett Upson | Punter | Spalding High School | Griffin, Georgia | Vanderbilt |

=== 2006 team ===
Coach of the Year: J. T. Curtis (John Curtis Christian High School, River Ridge, Louisiana)

Note: Bold denotes Offensive and Defensive Players of the Year, respectively, and ^{‡} denotes high school juniors

First Team Offense

| Player | Position | School | Hometown | College |
|---|---|---|---|---|
| **Jimmy Clausen** | **Quarterback** | **Oaks Christian High School** | Westlake Village, California | Notre Dame |
| Marc Tyler | Running back | Oaks Christian High School | Westlake Village, California | USC |
| Noel Devine | Running back | North Fort Myers High School | North Fort Myers, Florida | West Virginia |
| Arrelious Benn | Wide receiver | Dunbar High School | Washington, D.C. | Illinois |
| A. J. Green^{‡} | Wide receiver | Summerville High School | Summerville, South Carolina | Georgia |
| Aaron Hernandez | Tight end | Bristol Central High School | Bristol, Connecticut | Florida |
| Chris Little | Offensive line | Twiggs County High School | Jeffersonville, Georgia | Georgia |
| Ryan Miller | Offensive line | Columbine High School | Littleton, Colorado | Colorado |
| Anthony Davis | Offensive line | Piscataway High School | Piscataway, New Jersey | Rutgers |
| Tray Allen | Offensive line | South Grand Prairie High School | Grand Prairie, Texas | Texas |
| Lee Ziemba | Offensive line | Rogers High School | Rogers, Arkansas | Auburn |
| Jimmy Stevens | Placekicker | Heritage Hall School | Oklahoma City, Oklahoma | Oklahoma |

First Team Defense

| Player | Position | School | Hometown | College |
|---|---|---|---|---|
| **Marvin Austin** | **Defensive line** | **Ballou High School** | Washington, D.C. | North Carolina |
| Martez Wilson | Defensive line | Simeon Career Academy | Chicago, Illinois | Illinois |
| Joseph Barksdale | Defensive line | Cass Technical High School | Detroit, Michigan | LSU |
| Everson Griffen | Defensive line | Agua Fria High School | Avondale, Arizona | USC |
| Chris Galippo | Linebacker | Servite High School | Anaheim, California | USC |
| Chris Donald | Linebacker | Huntingdon High School | Huntingdon, Tennessee | Tennessee |
| Keenan Robinson | Linebacker | Plano East High School | Plano, Texas | Texas |
| Eugene Clifford | Defensive back | Colerain High School | Cincinnati, Ohio | Ohio State |
| Major Wright | Defensive back | St. Thomas Aquinas High School | Fort Lauderdale, Florida | Florida |
| Greg Little | Defensive back | Hillside High School | Durham, North Carolina | North Carolina |
| Joe McKnight | Defensive back | John Curtis Christian High School | River Ridge, Louisiana | USC |
| Bryan Anger | Punter | Camarillo High School | Camarillo, California | California |

Second Team Offense

| Player | Position | School | Hometown | College |
|---|---|---|---|---|
| Ryan Mallett | Quarterback | Texas High School | Texarkana, Texas | Michigan |
| Bradley Stephens | Running back | McAllen Memorial High School | McAllen, Texas | Texas A&M |
| John Clay | Running back | Racine Park High School | Racine, Wisconsin | Wisconsin |
| Michael Floyd^{‡} | Wide receiver | Cretin-Derham Hall High School | St. Paul, Minnesota | Notre Dame |
| Terrence Toliver | Wide receiver | Hempstead High School | Hempstead, Texas | LSU |
| Martell Webb | Tight end | Northern High School | Pontiac, Michigan | Michigan |
| Bryan Bulaga | Offensive line | Marian Central Catholic High School | Woodstock, Illinois | Iowa |
| Chris O'Dowd | Offensive line | Salpointe Catholic High School | Tucson, Arizona | USC |
| James Wilson | Offensive line | Nease High School | Ponte Vedra, Florida | Florida |
| Matt Romine | Offensive line | Union High School | Tulsa, Oklahoma | Notre Dame |
| Trinton Sturdivant | Offensive line | Anson High School | Wadesboro, North Carolina | Georgia |
| Philip Welch | Placekicker | Fort Collins High School | Fort Collins, Colorado | Wisconsin |
| David Soldner | Placekicker | Manheim Township High School | Lancaster, Pennsylvania | Penn State |

Second Team Defense

| Player | Position | School | Hometown | College |
|---|---|---|---|---|
| D'Angelo McCray | Defensive line | Andrew Jackson Highschool | Jacksonville, Florida | Eastern Illinois |
| Torrey Davis | Defensive line | Armwood High School | Seffner, Florida | Florida |
| Tydreke Powell | Defensive line | Hertford County High School | Ahoskie, North Carolina | North Carolina |
| Andre Jones | Defensive line | Andress High School | El Paso, Texas | Texas |
| Chris Strong | Linebacker | South Panola High School | Batesville, Mississippi | Mississippi |
| Lorenzo Edwards | Linebacker | Edgewater High School | Orlando, Florida | Florida |
| Allen Bailey | Linebacker | McIntosh High School | Darien, Georgia | Miami (FL) |
| Marcus Gilchrist | Defensive back | Andrews High School | High Point, North Carolina | Clemson |
| Donovan Warren | Defensive back | Poly High School | Long Beach, California | Michigan |
| Dionte Allen | Defensive back | St. Mary's Preparatory | Orchard Lake, Michigan | Florida State |
| Golden Tate | Athlete | Pope John Paul II High School | Hendersonville, Tennessee | Notre Dame |
| Chris Lovvorn^{‡} | Punter | McGill-Toolen Catholic High School | Mobile, Alabama | Mississippi College |

=== 2007 team ===
Coach of the Year: Tim Harris (Booker T. Washington High School, Miami, Florida)

Note: Bold denotes Offensive and Defensive Players of the Year, respectively, and ^{‡} denotes high school juniors

First Team Offense

| Player | Position | School | Hometown | College |
|---|---|---|---|---|
| **Terrelle Pryor** | **Quarterback** | **Jeannette High School** | Jeannette, Pennsylvania | Ohio State |
| Darrell Scott | Running back | St. Bonaventure High School | Ventura, California | Colorado |
| Bryce Brown^{‡} | Running back | Wichita High School East | Wichita, Kansas | Tennessee |
| Mike Brewster | Offensive line | Edgewater High School | Orlando, Florida | Ohio State |
| Trevor Robinson | Offensive line | Elkhorn High School | Elkhorn, Nebraska | Notre Dame |
| Josh Jenkins | Offensive line | Parkersburg High School | Parkersburg, West Virginia | West Virginia |
| Mike Adams | Offensive line | Dublin Coffman High School | Dublin, Ohio | Ohio State |
| Matt Patchan | Offensive line | Armwood High School | Seffner, Florida | Florida |
| Michael Floyd | Wide receiver | Cretin-Derham Hall High School | St. Paul, Minnesota | Notre Dame |
| Julio Jones | Wide receiver | Foley High School | Foley, Alabama | Alabama |
| Kyle Rudolph | Tight end | Elder High School | Cincinnati, Ohio | Notre Dame |
| Blair Walsh | Placekicker | Cardinal Gibbons High School | Fort Lauderdale, Florida | Georgia |

First Team Defense

| Player | Position | School | Hometown | College |
|---|---|---|---|---|
| **Patrick Peterson** | **Defensive back** | **Blanche Ely High School** | Pompano Beach, Florida | LSU |
| T. J. Bryant | Defensive back | Lincoln High School | Tallahassee, Florida | USC |
| Nolan Brewster | Defensive back | Mullen High School | Denver, Colorado | Texas |
| Arthur Brown | Linebacker | Wichita High School East | Wichita, Kansas | Miami (FL) |
| Nigel Bradham | Linebacker | Wakulla High School | Crawfordville, Florida | Florida State |
| Brendan Beal | Linebacker | Liberty High School | Bethlehem, Pennsylvania | Florida |
| Shayne Hale | Linebacker | Gateway High School | Monroeville, Pennsylvania | Pittsburgh |
| DeAngelo Tyson | Defensive line | Statesboro High School | Statesboro, Georgia | Georgia |
| Marcus Forston | Defensive line | Miami Northwestern High School | Miami, Florida | Miami (FL) |
| Nick Perry | Defensive line | King High School | Detroit, Michigan | USC |
| Will Hill | Athlete | St. Peter's Preparatory School | Hoboken, New Jersey | Florida |
| Ben Buchanan | Punter | Central High School | Westerville, Ohio | Ohio State |

Second Team Offense

| Player | Position | School | Hometown | College |
|---|---|---|---|---|
| Matt Barkley^{‡} | Quarterback | Mater Dei High School | Santa Ana, California | USC |
| Sam McGuffie | Running back | Cy-Fair High School | Cypress, Texas | Michigan/Rice |
| Ryan Bass | Running back | Centennial High School | Corona, California | Arizona State |
| Matt Kalil | Offensive line | Servite High School | Anaheim, California | USC |
| Baker Steinkuhler | Offensive line | Lincoln Southwest High School | Lincoln, Nebraska | Nebraska |
| Stephen Good | Offensive line | Paris High School | Paris, Texas | Oklahoma |
| Kyle Long | Offensive line | St. Anne's-Belfield School | Charlottesville, Virginia | Florida State |
| A.J. Harmon | Offensive line | Jefferson County High School | Louisville, Georgia | Georgia |
| DeAndre Brown | Wide receiver | Ocean Springs High School | Ocean Springs, Mississippi | Southern Miss |
| Aldarius Johnson | Wide receiver | Miami Northwestern High School | Miami, Florida | Miami (FL) |
| Kavario Middleton | Tight end | Elder High School | Cincinnati, Ohio | Washington/Montana |
| Milton Knox | Athlete | Birmingham High School | Lake Balboa, California | UCLA/Fresno State |

Second Team Defense

| Player | Position | School | Hometown | College |
|---|---|---|---|---|
| Dan McCarthy | Defensive back | Cardinal Mooney High School | Youngstown, Ohio | Notre Dame |
| Dee Finley | Defensive back | Auburn High School | Auburn, Alabama | Florida |
| Aaron Williams | Defensive back | Round Rock High School | Round Rock, Texas | Texas |
| Jamarkus McFarland^{‡} | Defensive Line | Lufkin High School | Lufkin, Texas | Oklahoma |
| DaQuan Bowers | Defensive Line | Bamberg Ehrhardt High School | Bamberg, South Carolina | Clemson |
| R.J. Washington | Defensive Line | Fossil Ridge High School | Keller, Texas | Oklahoma |
| Jarvis Humphrey | Defensive Line | Cedar Hill High School | Cedar Hill, Texas | Texas |
| Marcus Robinson | Linebacker | Homestead High School | Homestead, Florida | Miami (FL) |
| Steve Filer | Linebacker | Mount Carmel High School | Chicago, Illinois | Notre Dame |
| Michael Mauti | Linebacker | Mandeville High School | Mandeville, Louisiana | Penn State |
| William Green | Linebacker | Spain Park High School | Hoover, Alabama | Florida |
| Gerrell Robinson | Athlete | Hamilton High School | Chandler, Arizona | Arizona State |

=== 2008 team ===
Coach of the Year: George Smith (St. Thomas Aquinas High School, Fort Lauderdale, Florida)

Note: Bold denotes Offensive and Defensive Players of the Year, respectively, and ^{‡} denotes high school juniors

First Team Offense

| Player | Position | School | Hometown | College |
|---|---|---|---|---|
| **Garrett Gilbert** | **Quarterback** | **Lake Travis High School** | Austin, Texas | Texas |
| Bryce Brown | Running back | Wichita East High School | Wichita, Kansas | Tennessee |
| Cierre Wood | Running back | Santa Clara High School | Oxnard, California | Notre Dame |
| D. J. Fluker | Offensive line | Foley High School | Foley, Alabama | Alabama |
| Xavier Nixon | Offensive line | Britt High School | Fayetteville, North Carolina | Florida |
| Seantrel Henderson^{‡} | Offensive line | Cretin-Derham Hall High School | St. Paul, Minnesota | Miami (FL) |
| Mason Walters | Offensive line | Frenship High School | Wolfforth, Texas | Texas |
| Chris Watt | Offensive line | Glenbard West High School | Glen Ellyn, Illinois | Notre Dame |
| Terry Hawthorne | Wide receiver | East St. Louis High School | East St. Louis, Illinois | Illinois |
| Randall Carroll | Wide receiver | Cathedral High School | Los Angeles, California | UCLA |
| Rueben Randle | Athlete | Bastrop High School | Bastrop, Louisiana | LSU |
| Dustin Hopkins | Placekicker | Clear Lake High School | Houston, Texas | Florida State |

First Team Defense

| Player | Position | School | Hometown | College |
|---|---|---|---|---|
| **Manti Teʻo** | **Linebacker** | **Punahou School** | Honolulu, Hawaii | Notre Dame |
| Ryne Giddins | Defensive line | Armwood High School | Seffner, Florida | South Florida |
| Jacobi McDaniel | Defensive line | Madison County High School | Madison, Florida | Florida State |
| Sheldon Richardson | Defensive line | Gateway Institute of Technology | St. Louis, Missouri | Missouri |
| Jamel Turner^{‡} | Defensive line | Ursuline High School | Youngstown, Ohio | Ohio State |
| Jamarkus McFarland | Defensive line | Lufkin High School | Lufkin, Texas | Oklahoma |
| Jelani Jenkins | Linebacker | Good Counsel High School | Olney, Maryland | Florida |
| Dre Kirkpatrick | Defensive back | Gadsden City High School | Gadsden, Alabama | Alabama |
| Janzen Jackson | Defensive back | Barbe High School | Lake Charles, Louisiana | Tennessee |
| Patrick Hall | Defensive back | St. Bonaventure High School | Ventura, California | USC |
| Gabe Lynn | Defensive back | Jenks High School | Jenks, Oklahoma | Oklahoma |
| Pete Kontodiakos | Punter | Countryside High School | Clearwater, Florida | Colorado State |

Second Team Offense

| Player | Position | School | Hometown | College |
|---|---|---|---|---|
| Russell Shepard | Quarterback | Cypress Ridge High School | Houston, Texas | LSU |
| Michael Ford | Running back | Leesville High School | Leesville, Louisiana | LSU |
| Trent Richardson | Running back | Escambia High School | Pensacola, Florida | Alabama |
| Morgan Moses | Offensive line | Meadowbrook High School | Richmond, Virginia | Virginia |
| Marcus Hall | Offensive line | Glenville High School | Cleveland, Ohio | Ohio State |
| Paden Kelley | Offensive line | Lake Travis High School | Austin, Texas | Texas |
| Stavion Lowe | Offensive line | Brownwood High School | Brownwood, Texas | LSU |
| Garry Gilliam | Tight end | Milton Hershey School | Hershey, Pennsylvania | Penn State |
| Marlon Brown | Wide receiver | Harding Academy | Memphis, Tennessee | Georgia |
| Logan Heastie | Wide receiver | Great Bridge High School | Chesapeake, Virginia | West Virginia |
| James Boyd | Athlete | Jordan High School | Los Angeles, California | USC |
| Anthony Fera | Placekicker | St. Pius X High School | Houston, Texas | Penn State |

Second Team Defense

| Player | Position | School | Hometown | College |
|---|---|---|---|---|
| Devon Kennard | Defensive line | Desert Vista High School | Phoenix, Arizona | USC |
| Alex Okafor | Defensive line | Pflugerville High School | Pflugerville, Texas | Texas |
| Donte Moss | Defensive line | Northside High School | Jacksonville, North Carolina | North Carolina |
| William Gholston^{‡} | Defensive line | Mumford High School | Detroit, Michigan | Michigan State |
| Chris Davenport | Defensive line | Mansfield High School | Mansfield, Louisiana | Tennessee |
| Abry Jones | Defensive line | Northside High School | Warner Robins, Georgia | Georgia |
| Vontaze Burfict | Linebacker | Centennial High School | Corona, California | Arizona State |
| Jarvis Jones | Linebacker | Carver High School | Columbus, Georgia | USC |
| Marquis Simmons | Linebacker | Dominguez High School | Compton, California | USC |
| Craig Loston | Defensive back | Eisenhower High School | Houston, Texas | LSU |
| Darius Winston | Defensive back | Central High School | West Helena, Arkansas | Arkansas |
| Ray Ray Armstrong | Athlete | Seminole High School | Sanford, Florida | Miami (FL) |

=== 2009 team ===
Coach of the Year: Greg Toal (Don Bosco Preparatory High School, Ramsey, New Jersey)

Note: Bold denotes Offensive and Defensive Players of the Year, respectively, and ^{‡} denotes high school juniors

First Team Offense

| Player | Position | School | Hometown | College |
|---|---|---|---|---|
| **Seantrel Henderson** | **Offensive line** | **Cretin-Derham Hall High School** | St. Paul, Minnesota | Miami (FL) |
| Matt Elam | Athlete | Dwyer High School | West Palm Beach, Florida | Florida |
| Kyle Prater | Wide receiver | Proviso West High School | Hillside, Illinois | USC |
| Darius White | Wide receiver | Dunbar High School | Fort Worth, Texas | Texas |
| Robert Woods | Wide receiver | Junípero Serra High School | Gardena, California | USC |
| Jake Heaps | Quarterback | Skyline High School | Sammamish, Washington | BYU |
| Marcus Lattimore | Running back | Byrnes High School | Duncan, South Carolina | South Carolina |
| Lache Seastrunk | Running back | Temple High School | Temple, Texas | Oregon |
| James Hurst | Offensive line | Plainfield High School | Plainfield, Indiana | North Carolina |
| Matt James | Offensive line | St. Xavier High School | Cincinnati, Ohio | Notre Dame |
| Christian Lombard | Offensive line | Fremd High School | Palatine, Illinois | Notre Dame |
| Kip Smith | Placekicker | Legacy High School | Broomfield, Colorado | UCLA |

First Team Defense

| Player | Position | School | Hometown | College |
|---|---|---|---|---|
| **Lamarcus Joyner** | **Defensive back** | **St. Thomas Aquinas High School** | Fort Lauderdale, Florida | Florida State |
| Sharrif Floyd | Defensive line | Washington High School | Philadelphia, Pennsylvania | Florida |
| Jackson Jeffcoat | Defensive line | Plano West High School | Plano, Texas | Texas |
| Ronald Powell | Defensive line | Rancho Verde High School | Moreno Valley, California | Florida |
| Jacques Smith | Defensive line | Ooltewah High School | Ooltewah, Tennessee | Tennessee |
| Brandon Willis | Defensive line | Byrnes High School | Duncan, South Carolina | North Carolina |
| Jordan Hicks | Linebacker | Lakota West High School | West Chester, Ohio | Texas |
| Jeff Luc | Linebacker | Treasure Coast High School | New Port Richey, Florida | Florida State |
| Chris Martin | Linebacker | Grandview High School | Aurora, Colorado | Florida |
| Tony Jefferson | Defensive back | Eastlake High School | Chula Vista, California | Oklahoma |
| DeMarcus Milliner | Defensive back | Stanhope Elmore High School | Millbrook, Alabama | Alabama |
| Alec Ogletree | Defensive back | Newnan High School | Newnan, Georgia | Georgia |

Second Team Offense

| Player | Position | School | Hometown | College |
|---|---|---|---|---|
| Demarco Cobbs | Athlete | Tulsa Central High School | Tulsa, Oklahoma | Texas |
| Chris Dunkley | Wide receiver | Pahokee High School | Pahokee, Florida | Florida |
| Keenan Allen | Wide receiver | Northern Guilford High School | Greensboro, North Carolina | California |
| C. J. Fiedorowicz | Tight end | Johnsburg High School | Johnsburg, Illinois | Iowa |
| Xavier Grimble | Tight end | Bishop Gorman High School | Las Vegas, Nevada | USC |
| Robert Crisp | Offensive line | Athens Drive High School | Raleigh, North Carolina | North Carolina State |
| Jake Matthews | Offensive line | Elkins High School | Missouri City, Texas | Texas A&M |
| Ian Silberman | Offensive line | Fleming Island High School | Orange Park, Florida | Florida |
| Malcolm Jones | Running back | Oaks Christian High School | Westlake Village, California | UCLA |
| Herschel Sims^{‡} | Running back | Abilene High School | Abilene, Texas | Oklahoma State |
| Phillip Sims | Quarterback | Oscar Smith High School | Chesapeake, Virginia | Alabama |
| Cody Parkey | Placekicker | Jupiter High School | Jupiter, Florida | Auburn |

Second Team Defense

| Player | Position | School | Hometown | College |
|---|---|---|---|---|
| William Gholston | Defensive line | Southeastern High School | Detroit, Michigan | Michigan State |
| Corey Miller | Defensive line | Byrnes High School | Duncan, South Carolina | Tennessee |
| Reggie Wilson | Defensive line | Haltom High School | Haltom City, Texas | Texas |
| Owamagbe Odighizuwa | Defensive line | David Douglas High School | Portland, Oregon | UCLA |
| Steele Devitto | Linebacker | Don Bosco Preparatory High School | Ramsey, New Jersey | Boston College |
| Khairi Fortt | Linebacker | Stamford High School | Stamford, Connecticut | Penn State |
| James Wilder, Jr.^{‡} | Linebacker | Plant High School | Tampa, Florida | Florida State |
| Cody Riggs | Defensive back | St. Thomas Aquinas High School | Fort Lauderdale, Florida | Florida |
| Demar Dorsey | Defensive back | Boyd Anderson High School | Fort Lauderdale, Florida | Louisville |
| Sean Parker | Defensive back | Narbonne High School | Harbor City, California | Washington |
| Latwan Anderson | Defensive back | Glenville High School | Cleveland, Ohio | Miami (FL) |
| DeAnthony Thomas^{‡} | Athlete | Crenshaw High School | Los Angeles, California | Oregon |

== See also ==
- USA Today High School Football Offensive Player of the Year
