= Brandon Minor =

American football player (born 1988)

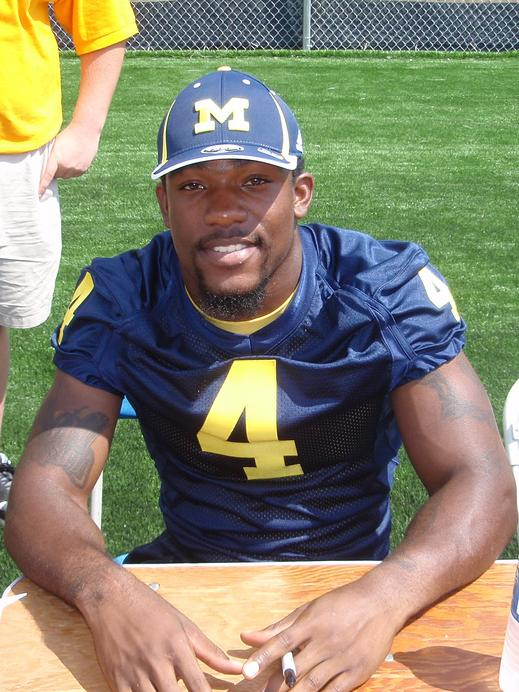
- Minor in 2008

No. 36
- Position: Running back

Personal information
- Born: July 24, 1988 (age 38); Richmond, Virginia, U.S.
- Listed height: 6 ft 0 in (1.83 m)
- Listed weight: 214 lb (97 kg)

Career information
- High school: Varina (Henrico, Virginia)
- College: Michigan
- NFL draft: 2010: undrafted

Career history
- Chicago Bears (2010)*; New Orleans Saints (2010)*; Indianapolis Colts (2010)*; Denver Broncos (2010–2011)*
- * Offseason or practice squad member only
- Stats at Pro Football Reference

Brandon Ricardo Minor (born July 24, 1988) is an American former college football player who was a running back for the Michigan Wolverines from 2006 to 2009. He was signed by the Chicago Bears of the National Football League (NFL) as an undrafted free agent in 2010, but was released during the final cuts and played on practice squads in 2010 for the New Orleans Saints and Indianapolis Colts.

At Michigan, Minor finished second on the team in rushing both as a freshman and sophomore and led the team in rushing both as a junior and senior. As a junior, he was an honorable mention All-Big Ten Conference selection by the coaches. He had previously been ranked as the number one high school football fullback in the nation, according to Rivals.com.

He spent his first two years at Michigan serving as one of the primary backups to Mike Hart. In his third year, he emerged from a field of five running backs who were vying to replace Hart as the leading rusher and scorer. He has shared starting responsibilities in his junior and senior seasons. He entered his senior season on the watch lists for the Doak Walker and Maxwell Awards. ESPN.com ranked him as the 22nd best player and third best running back in the Big Ten Conference before the season started.

== Youth career ==
Minor grew up as a Michigan Wolverines fan. His mother, Julie Gilliam, has pictures of him at age six wearing a Michigan uniform. At age nine, Minor wrote the university to inquire about becoming a Michigan football player. Every year he and his mother watched the Michigan - Ohio State game and rooted for Michigan.

=== High school ===
Minor inherited the Varina High School starting varsity team role as a sophomore in 2003, and he gained 209 rushing yards in his first start. That season, he helped his team reach the Virginia Central Region, Division 6 championship (the qualifying game for the Virginia High School League state semifinals). He concluded the regular season as an All-District first-team selection and after the playoffs was selected as a second-team all-region choice. During the season, he rushed for 1,750 yards and 22 touchdowns for the 10–2 (7–0) Varina Blue Devils. Minor also played varsity basketball as a sophomore. During the season, he once made seven three-point field goals in a game.

As a junior, when Varina's former Capital District offensive player of the year Army Spc. Clarence Adams III died serving the 91st Engineer Battalion, 1st Cavalry Division in Baghdad, Iraq, Minor gave up his number 3 to wear Adams' #33 as a tribute. In the District championship game, he rushed for 239 yards on 27 carries, including four touchdown runs. In the subsequent Central Region, Division 6 semifinals, he set a Central Region playoff record by rushing for 296 yards, but his undefeated top-ranked team was upset. He concluded the season as both a first-team all-district and all-Metro Region selection after compiling 2,091 yards rushing and scoring 32 rushing touchdowns (plus 2 receiving touchdowns). He was also selected to the Group AAA Virginia High School Football Coaches Association all-state second-team by the coaches.

Entering his senior season, he was ranked as the sixth best senior football player in Virginia by TechSideline.com. The Roanoke Times described him as "one of the top five recruits in the state" at the time of his August 2005 visit to see the first day of Virginia Tech Hokies football practice. At the time, he was considering Miami, Michigan, Florida, Virginia Tech, Tennessee, LSU and Ohio State. However, he started the season on crutches, due to a torn hip flexor. He returned to the lineup for the team's final regular season game and rushed for 174 yards on 28 carries. Davon Morgan, his cousin, who now plays strong safety for Virginia Tech, was the team's quarterback. Despite missing most of the season, he was still honored as an all-district and all-region selection. His three-year career totals were 4,259 yards and 64 touchdowns. As a graduating senior he was the number one ranked high school football fullback in the nation, according to rivals.com. Following his senior season, he scored the only touchdown in the East-West Virginia High School Coaches Association All-star game.

College recruiting
Name	Hometown	School	Height	Weight	40^{‡}	Commit date
Brandon Minor; RB	Richmond, Virginia	Varina (VA)	6 ft 0 in (1.83 m)	211.5 lb (95.9 kg)	4.625	Jan 23, 2006
Brandon Minor; RB	Recruit ratings: Scout: Rivals: (78)					
Overall recruit ranking: Scout: 29 (RB) Rivals: 109, 1 (FB), 10 (VA) ESPN: 34 (RB)
Note: In many cases, Scout, Rivals, 247Sports, On3, and ESPN may conflict in their listings of height and weight.; In these cases, the average was taken. ESPN grades are on a 100-point scale.; Sources: "Michigan Football Commitments". Rivals.; "2006 Michigan Football Commits". Scout.; "ESPN". ESPN.; "Scout.com Team Recruiting Rankings". Scout.; "2006 Team Ranking". Rivals.com.

== College career ==
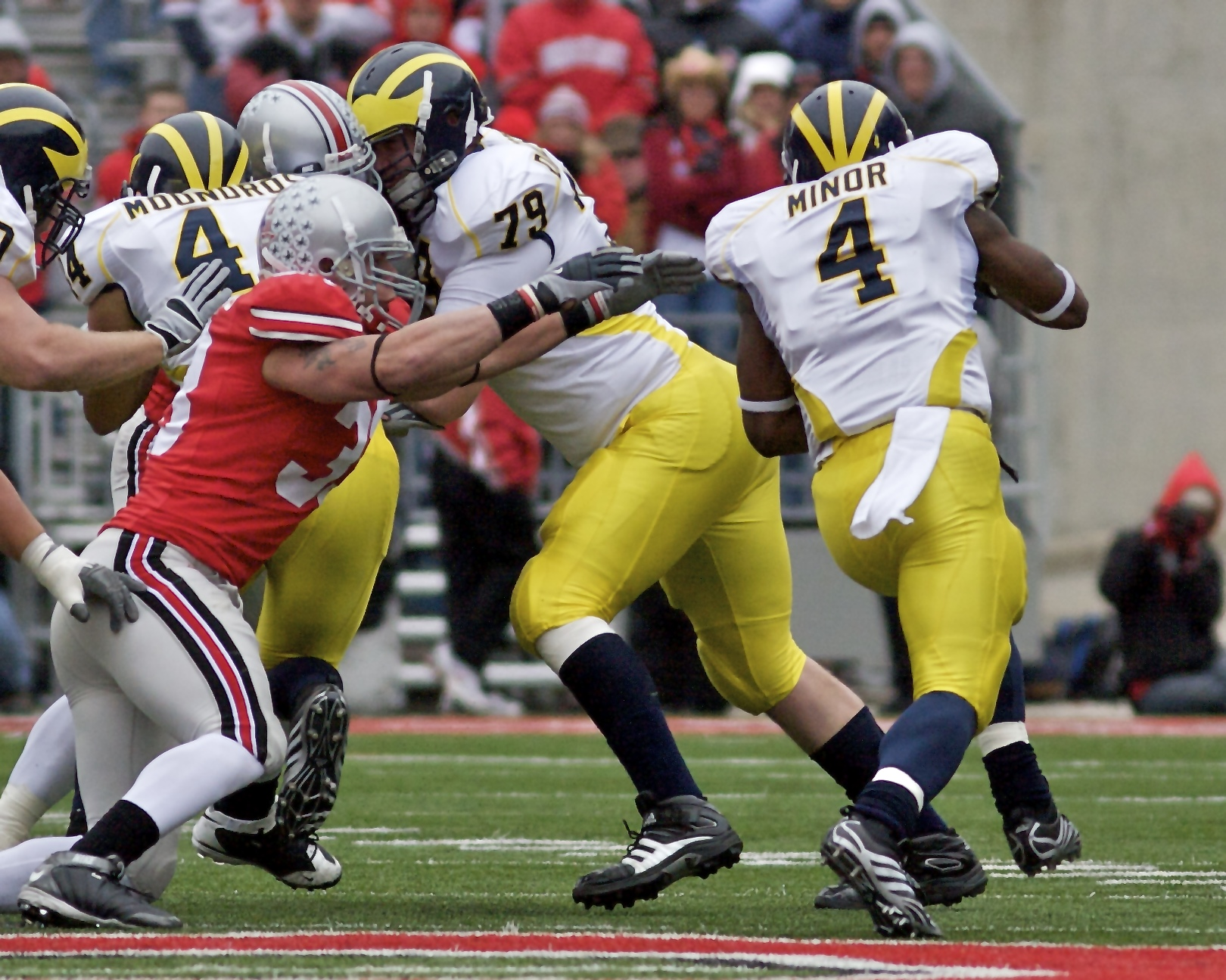
Minor eludes James Laurinaitis during the 2008 Michigan – Ohio State rivalry game

=== Lloyd Carr era ===
In January 2006, Minor selected the University of Michigan. Although he did not enroll in the 2006 Summer semester, he reported to Michigan on June 16 for strength and conditioning training. Minor and fellow freshman Carlos Brown were behind three returning running backs (Mike Hart, Kevin Grady and senior Jerome Jackson) on the depth chart entering the season. Minor was considered the less heralded than Brown, who was regarded as the fastest player on the team. On opening day, only Hart and Grady had more carries than Minor, in part because Jackson, who entered his senior season with 505 career rushing yards, did not dress. In his first carry as a Wolverine, he rushed for 24 yards against the Vanderbilt Commodores during the September 2 season opening game. Nonetheless, the depth chart was not very clear behind Hart. By late September, Minor was clearly third on the depth chart and it seemed that Brown might be redshirted. When Hart left the game due to injury against Michigan State on October 7, Minor scored his first touchdown on a 40-yard run. He had his first 100-yard game on November 4, when he rushed for 108 yards on 12 carries, including a 40-yard touchdown run in a 34–26 win against Ball State. As a true freshman member of the 2006 Michigan Wolverines football team, Minor rushed for a total of 238 yards on 42 carries, which was second on the team to Hart.

During April 2007, Grady tore his anterior cruciate ligament and was lost for the season. In August, Brown broke his hand. It appeared Minor was seriously injured on October 13 when he was carted off the field and left the stadium wearing a protective boot on crutches. However, he recovered and for the next two weeks he and Brown combined to replace the injured Hart. He had his second 100-yard game and first 150-yard game on October 27 of that season during the 34–10 Little Brown Jug game victory against the Minnesota Golden Gophers when he rushed for 157 yards on 21 carries, including a 46-yard run and one touchdown. Although Hart returned to play in the Paul Bunyan Trophy game against Michigan State on November 3, he left the game early and Minor started the second half. Hart missed the next game on November 10, but Brown and Minor had poor performances. In all three of Hart's full game absences, Brown was the starter. As a sophomore on the 2007 Michigan Wolverines football team, Minor improved his rushing totals to 385 yards on 90 carries, which was again second on the team to Hart.

=== Rich Rodriguez era ===
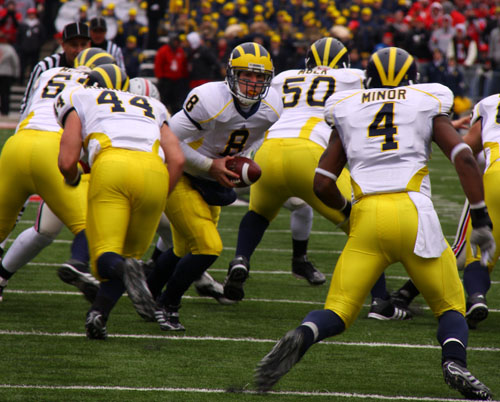
Nick Sheridan hands off to Minor during the 2008 Michigan – Ohio State rivalry game.

In 2008 Rich Rodriguez replaced Lloyd Carr as head coach. In the spring, Brown broke his finger weightlifting and Grady was still trying to get healthy. In early August, it appeared that juniors Brown and Minor would vie for the starting job because fourth-year junior Grady was under suspension related to driving while intoxicated charges. However, in camp it became apparent very quickly that true freshmen Sam McGuffie and Michael Shaw, would have a significant role in the newly installed spread option offense. With both Brown and Minor nursing injuries, McGuffie was tentatively penciled into the starting position on the depth chart.

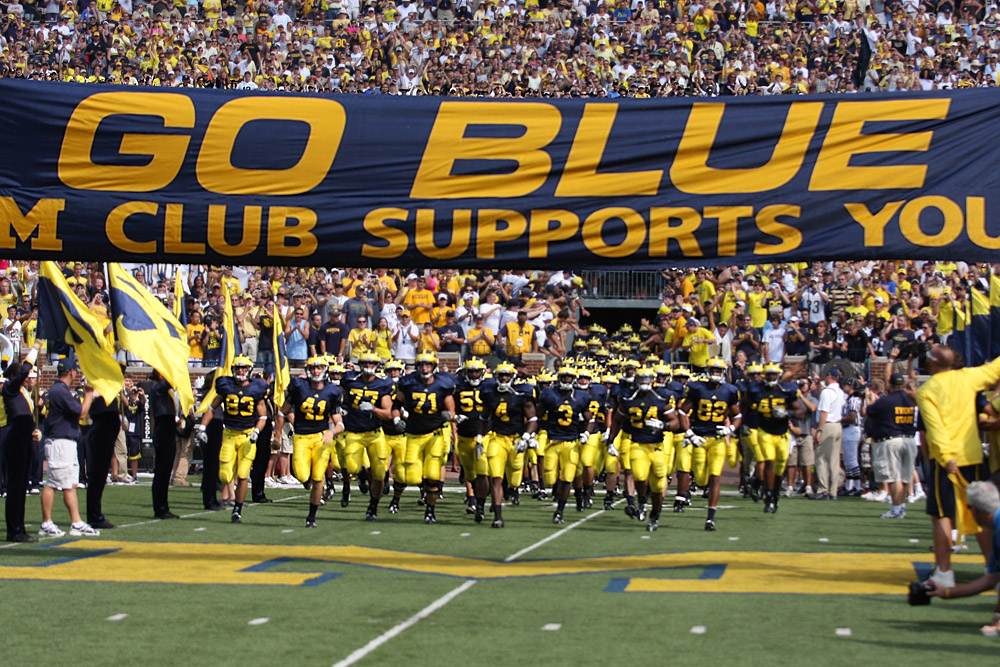
Minor is among those storming the field with the 2009 Michigan Wolverines football team as it enters Michigan Stadium.

As a junior member of the 2008 Michigan Wolverines football team, Minor became the team leader in rushing. However, he only started four games, while McGuffie started 6, Brown started 1 and Shaw started 1. McGuffie was the starter until he lost the job to Minor. Minor gave way to Shaw (November 8) and Brown (November 15) as the starter due to his injuries. Minor totalled 533 yards on 103 carries. He had nine rushing touchdowns and added two as a receiver. Of these eleven touchdowns, seven came in a three-week span that included a 117-yard two-touchdown rushing effort against Penn State on October 18 and a 155-yard three-touchdown rushing effort against Purdue on November 1. Sandwiched between these efforts, Minor scored on a 19-yard reception to complement his 55 yards and a rushing touchdown in the Paul Bunyan Trophy game against Michigan State on October 25. The Penn State game was Minor's first career start. During Minor's junior year, he played with a wrist injury that impaired his ability to hold the football with his right arm and his ability to stiffarm opponents. He was impaired by a variety of injuries throughout the season. At the conclusion of the 2008 Big Ten Conference football season, Minor was chosen as an honorable mention all-conference selection by the coaches.

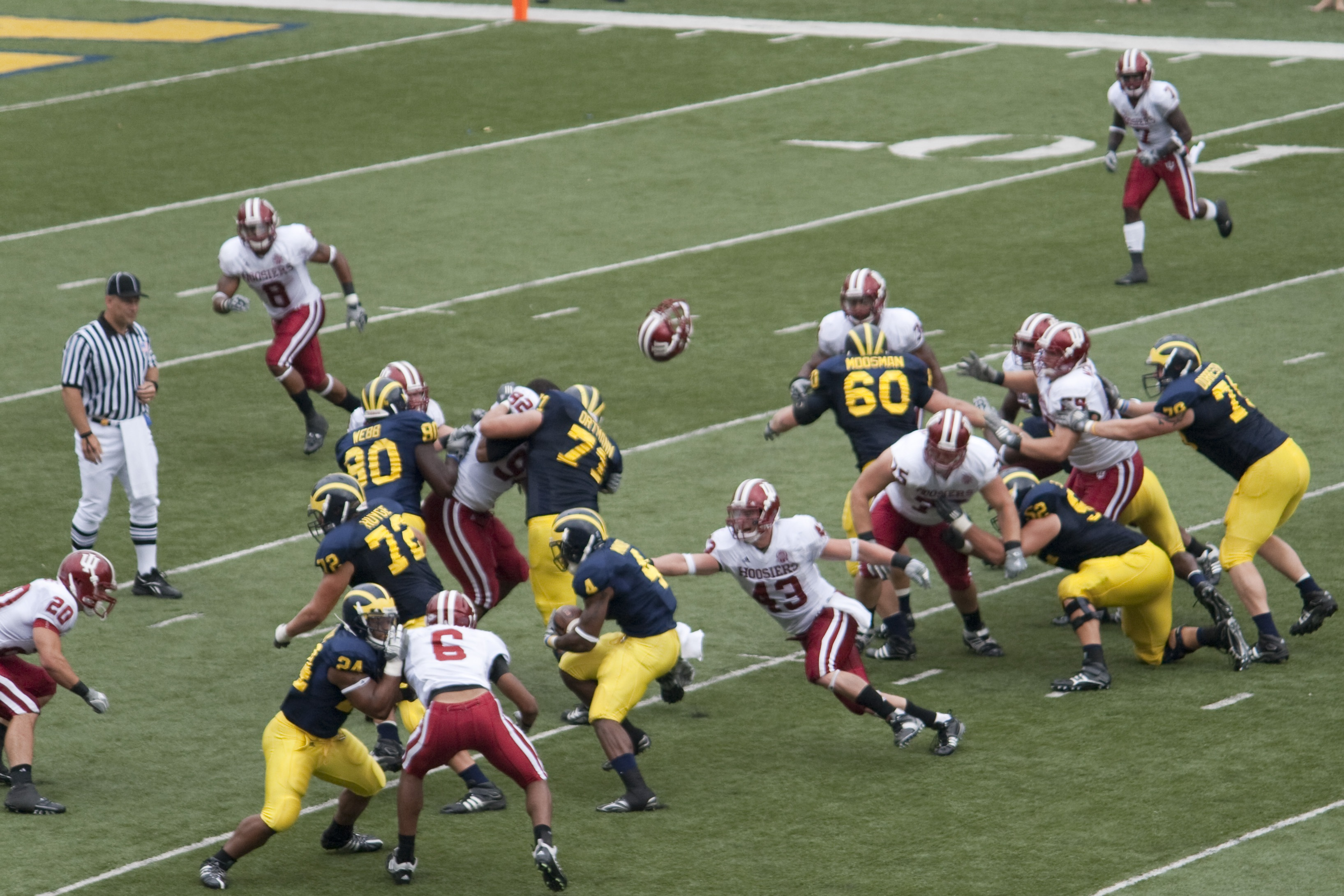
Minor runs the ball with blocking by Kevin Grady (24), Mark Huyge (72), Martell Webb (80), Mark Ortmann (71), David Moosman (60), Stephen Schilling (52), and Perry Dorrestein (79)

McGuffie transferred to the Rice Owls after the season. As a senior member of the 2009 Michigan Wolverines football team, Minor was named to a pair of watch lists: (Doak Walker Award and Maxwell Award). He was also selected by ESPN as the 22nd best player and 3rd best running back (behind Evan Royster and John Clay) in the Big Ten Conference before the season started. Minor missed the first game of the season due to a high ankle sprain. In the second game, which was the 2009 Michigan – Notre Dame rivalry game, he rushed for 106 yards and a touchdown on 16 carries during the 38–34 victory over Notre Dame. The ankle sprain hampered him much of the season and caused him to miss the October 17 game against Delaware State. He had a season-high 154-yard, 3-touchdown effort against Purdue on November 7. A shoulder injury kept him out of the last game of the season against Ohio State. Over the course of his collegiate career, he accumulated 20 rushing touchdowns and 1,658 yards. The torn rotator cuff also kept him from participating in the January 23, 2010 East–West Shrine Game.

== Professional career ==
=== 2010 ===
Minor signed with the Chicago Bears on April 24, 2010, after going undrafted in the 2010 NFL draft. He was released on September 1. He then signed with the New Orleans Saints to their practice squad. However, Minor was back with the Bears before being released at the beginning of October and signed by the Indianapolis Colts. Minor was released by the Colts in October. In November, Minor tried out for the Green Bay Packers before ending the season as a member of the Denver Broncos' practice squad.

=== 2011 ===
On September 4, 2011, the Broncos placed Minor on injured reserve. They waived him on October 10. In November 2011, he was "charged with possession of marijuana with intent to distribute" by the Virginia Commonwealth University police department following a traffic stop. He is scheduled for a traffic court appearance on January 18.
