= David Moosman =

American football player (born 1986)

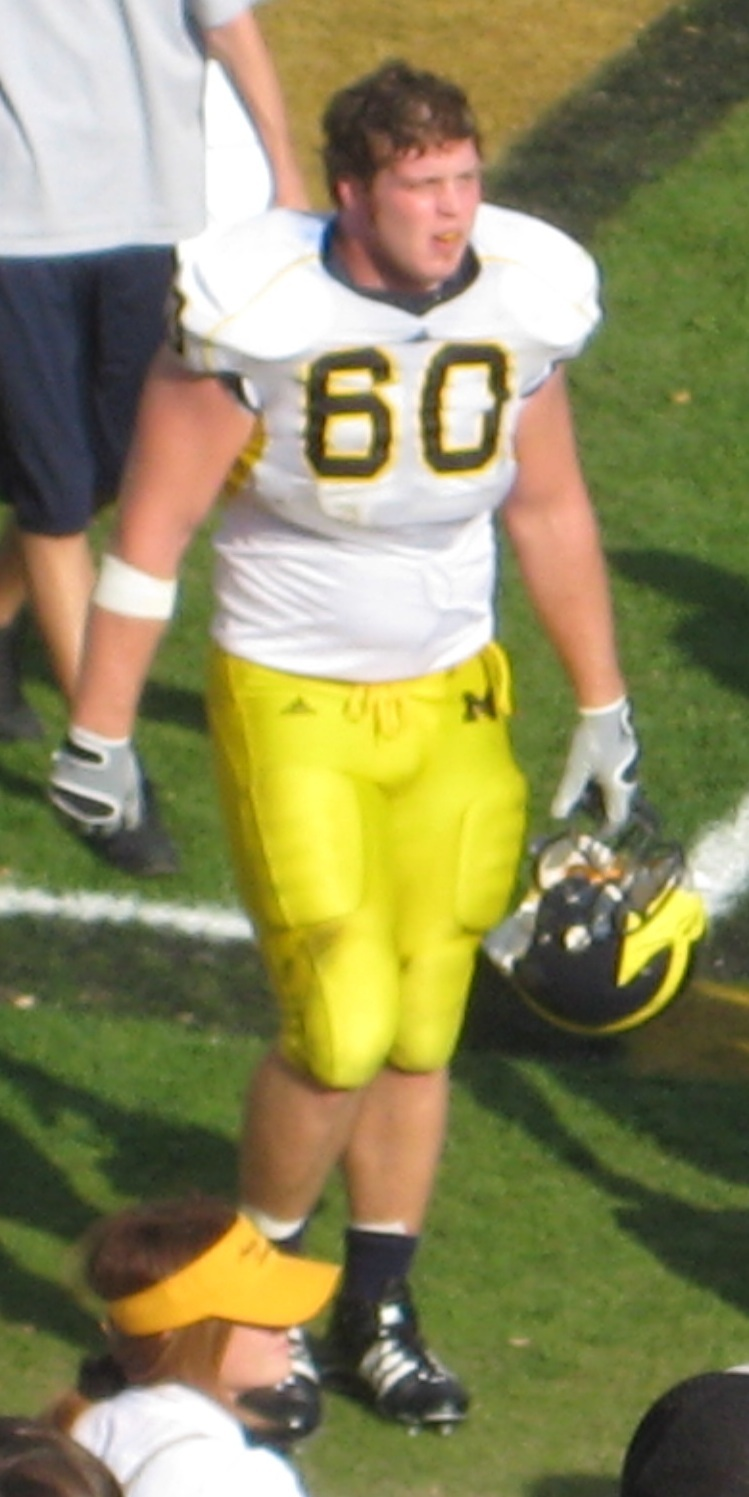
- Moosman at a Michigan Wolverines football game in 2008

No. 60
- Position: Offensive guard

Personal information
- Born: September 2, 1986 (age 40); Amsterdam, Netherlands
- Listed height: 6 ft 5 in (1.96 m)
- Listed weight: 298 lb (135 kg)

Career information
- High school: Libertyville (Libertyville, Illinois)
- College: Michigan
- NFL draft: 2010: undrafted

Career history
- Arizona Cardinals (2010)*
- * Offseason or practice squad member only

David Benjamin Moosman (born September 2, 1986) is an American football player who was signed by the Arizona Cardinals as a free agent following the 2010 NFL draft. He had previously played four years for the Michigan Wolverines football team, where he was a regular starter on the offensive line as a redshirt junior and senior for the 2008 and 2009 teams.

== Early life ==
Moosman played football at Libertyville High School in Libertyville, Illinois. He led them to an undefeated 2004 season and the Illinois High School Association state championship. He was named All-State as a senior by Chicago Tribune, Chicago Sun-Times and Champaign News-Gazette. Rivals.com ranked him as the eleventh ranked offensive guard in the nation and the number six prospect in Illinois. Scout.com ranked him as the number 17 offensive lineman in the nation. He was a three-year varsity wrestler and three-year varsity shot-putter on track. In wrestling, he qualified for the state championships three times.

College recruiting
Name	Hometown	School	Height	Weight	40^{‡}	Commit date
David Moosman; OG	Libertyville, Illinois	Libertyville (IL)	6 ft 4.5 in (1.94 m)	265 lb (120 kg)	5.3	Dec 19, 2004
David Moosman; OG	Recruit ratings: Scout: Rivals: (NR)					
Overall recruit ranking: Scout: 17 (OL) Rivals: 11 (OG), 6 (IL) ESPN: NR
Note: In many cases, Scout, Rivals, 247Sports, On3, and ESPN may conflict in their listings of height and weight.; In these cases, the average was taken. ESPN grades are on a 100-point scale.; Sources: "Michigan Football Commitments". Rivals.; "2005 Michigan Football Commits". Scout.; "ESPN". ESPN.; "Scout.com Team Recruiting Rankings". Scout.; "2005 Team Ranking". Rivals.com.

== College career ==
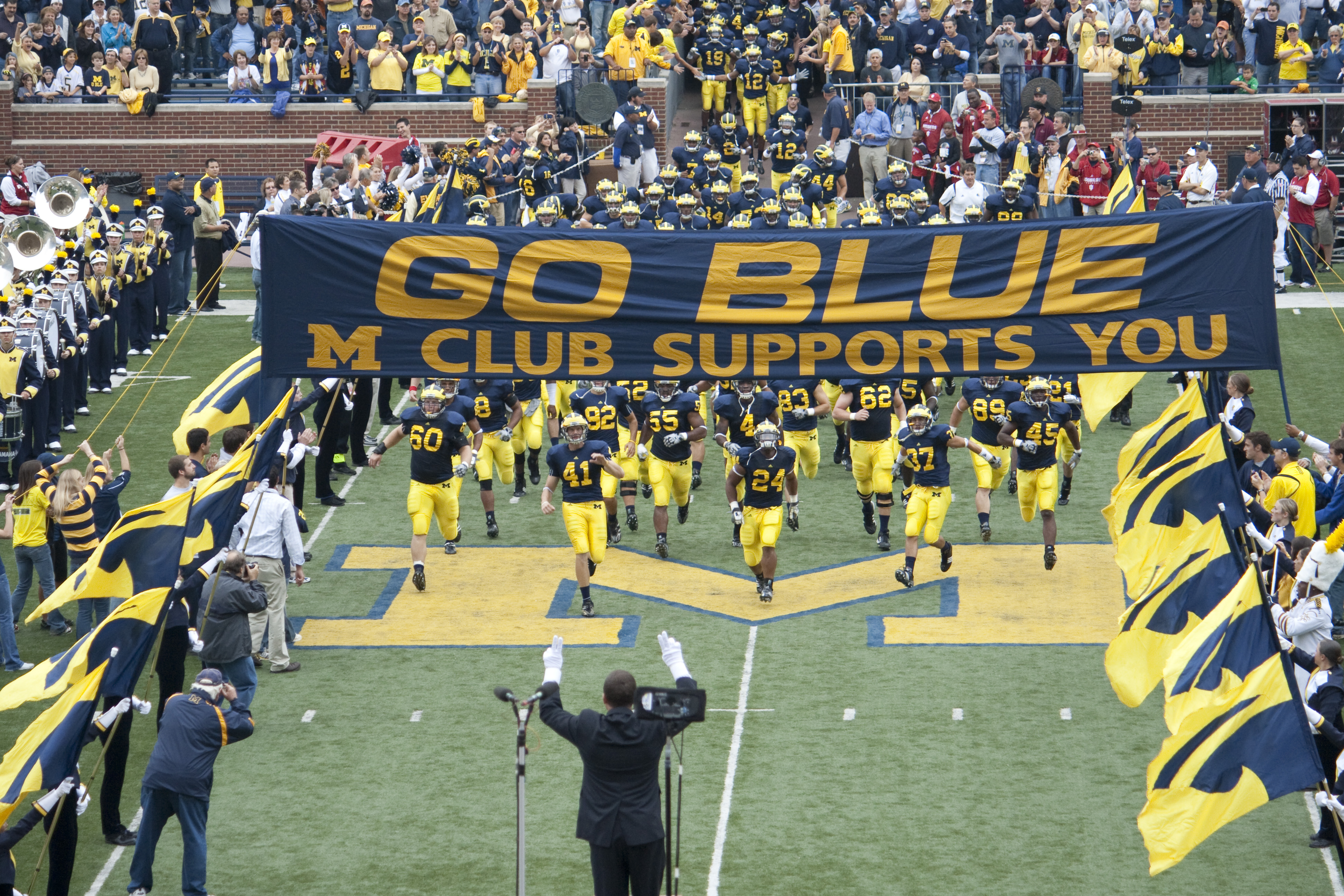
Moosman (60) is among those leading the 2009 Michigan Wolverines football team as it enters the field at Michigan Stadium.

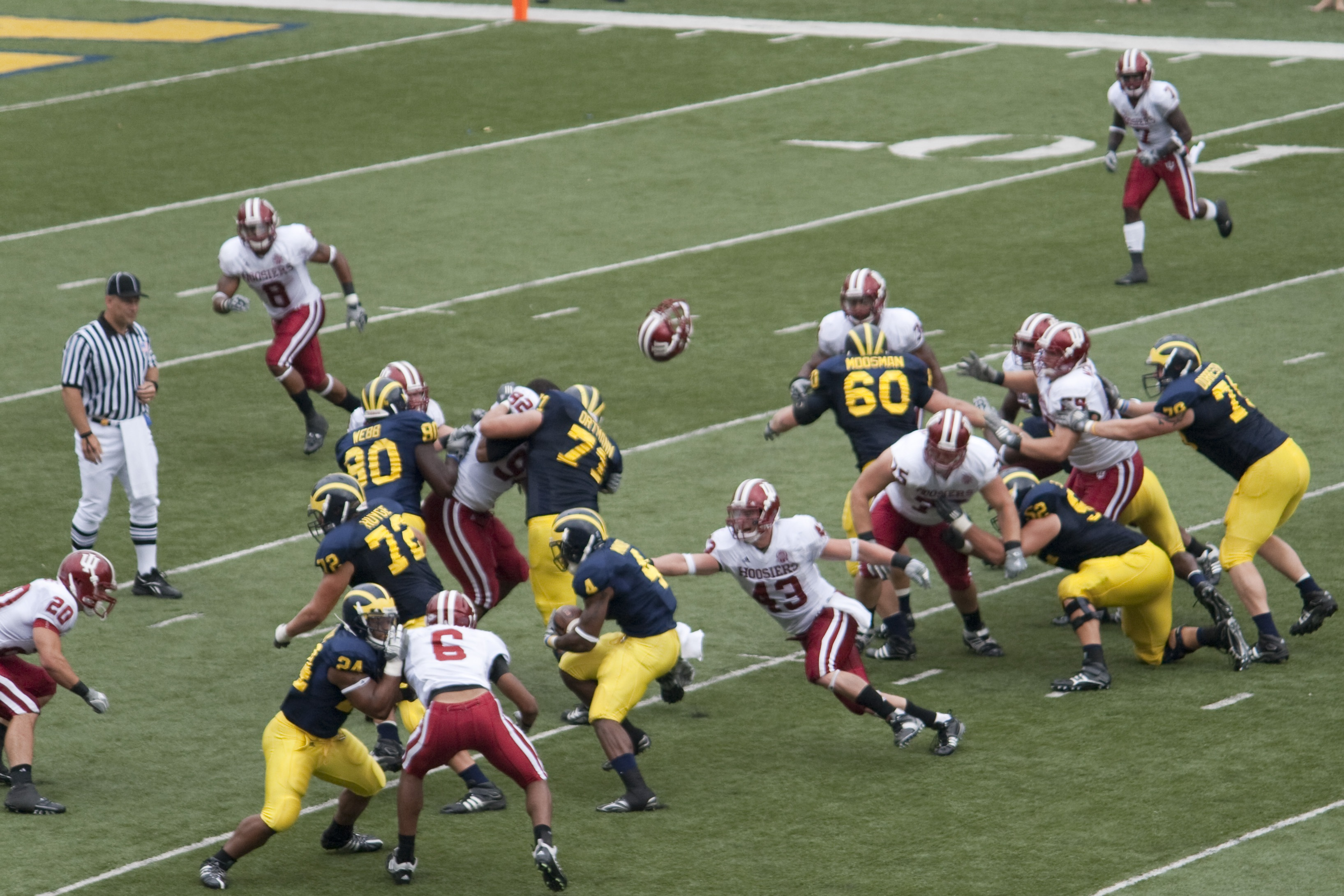
Moosman blocks for Brandon Minor along with Kevin Grady (24), Mark Huyge (72), Martell Webb (80), Mark Ortmann (71), Steven Schilling (52), and Perry Dorrestein (79)

At Michigan, he played in 29 games, starting in 15 games at right guard and 8 games at center. As a junior, he started all 12 games at right guard and played every snap at right guard. As a senior, he started 3 games at right guard and 8 at center.

== Professional career ==
Moosman signed as an undrafted free agent with the Arizona Cardinals on April 24, 2010, after going undrafted in the 2010 NFL draft. An Arizona Cardinals fansite believed that he needed to bulk up to have a chance at success in the NFL. He was cut on August 30.

== Personal life ==
His father, Michael, played football at Cornell from 1970–72. This included the 1971 team that was Ivy League co-champion on the strength of Heisman Trophy runner-up Ed Marinaro.

== Post NFL ==
After his brief stint in the NFL Moosman Coached the Parma Panthers to their second League Title win. He then went on to attend the Culinary Institute of America at Greystone in Napa Valley. After many years of working around the restaurant industry he has founded ToMarket to connect food manufacturers with their data through distributors.
