= Donald Evans (American football) =

American football player (born 1964)

No. 34, 77, 66
- Positions: Defensive end, defensive tackle

Personal information
- Born: March 14, 1964 (age 62); Raleigh, North Carolina, U.S.
- Listed height: 6 ft 2 in (1.88 m)
- Listed weight: 282 lb (128 kg)

Career information
- High school: Athens Drive (Raleigh, North Carolina)
- College: Winston-Salem State
- NFL draft: 1987: 2nd round, 47th overall pick

Career history
- Los Angeles Rams (1987); Philadelphia Eagles (1988); Pittsburgh Steelers (1990–1993); New York Jets (1994–1995)

Career NFL statistics
- Tackles: 327
- Sacks: 17
- Fumble recoveries: 8
- Stats at Pro Football Reference

Donald Lee Evans (born March 14, 1964) is an American former professional football player who was a defensive end for eight seasons in the National Football League (NFL) for the Los Angeles Rams, Philadelphia Eagles, Pittsburgh Steelers, and New York Jets.

== Early life ==
Evans attended Athens Drive High School, where he played tailback and linebacker. He also participated in other sports and became a 3-Sport High School Standout Athlete participating in Football, Basketball (power forward) and Track (100m and 200m) sprint.

After graduation, his #31 football jersey was retired, and he was inducted in the Athens Drive High School Sports Hall of Fame.

== College career ==
Following his athletic high school career, Evans accepted a football scholarship to be a student-athlete at Winston-Salem State University where he was coached by Coach William Bill Hayes. Evans became a 4-year standout football player/athlete. After playing several positions in college (halfback, tight end, & linebacker), Evans was moved to defensive end his senior year, he had 10 sacks and 65 tackles. After graduating, his alma mater dedicated and named the Donald L. Evans Fitness Center after him.

== Professional career ==
Pre-draft measurables
Height	Weight	Arm length	Hand span	40-yard dash	10-yard split	20-yard split	20-yard shuttle	Vertical jump	Broad jump	Bench press
6 ft 1 3/4 in (1.87 m)	262 lb (119 kg)	32 in (0.81 m)	8 1/2 in (0.22 m)	4.62 s	1.60 s	2.69 s	4.52 s	31.0 in (0.79 m)	9 ft 7 in (2.92 m)	29 reps
All values from NFL Combine

Evans played eight seasons in the National Football League. He was selected by the Rams in the second round of the 1987 NFL draft with the 47th overall pick. He played running back for the Los Angeles Rams (#34); linebacker and defensive end for the Philadelphia Eagles (#77); defensive end for the Pittsburgh Steelers (#66); and nose tackle and defensive tackle for the New York Jets (#66).

He played a total of 92 games during his NFL tenure; starting 84 games which equates to stats of starting 91.3% of games played during his career.
