= Rob Crisp =

American football player (born 1991)

No. 67, 79
- Position: Offensive tackle

Personal information
- Born: January 3, 1991 (age 35); Raleigh, North Carolina, U.S.
- Listed height: 6 ft 7 in (2.01 m)
- Listed weight: 300 lb (136 kg)

Career information
- High school: Raleigh (NC) Athens Drive
- College: NC State
- NFL draft: 2015: undrafted

Career history
- Arizona Cardinals (2015–2016)*; New Orleans Saints (2016)*
- * Offseason or practice squad member only

Robert Crisp (born January 3, 1991) is an American former football offensive tackle. He played college football at NC State.

== Early life ==
Crisp briefly attended Chapel Hill High School (Chapel Hill, North Carolina) before transferring to Athens Drive High School in Raleigh, North Carolina, where he recorded 75 pancake blocks playing offensive tackle during his senior season. He was an All-American selection by USA Today, Parade, and EA Sports. He played in the 2010 U.S. Army All-American Bowl, starting at right tackle.

In track & field, Crisp was one of the state's top performers in the throwing events, with bests of 15.11 meters (49-4) in the shot put and 39.00 meters (127-10) in the discus.

Regarded as a five-star recruit by Rivals.com, Crisp was listed as the No. 2 offensive tackle prospect in the class of 2010, behind only Seantrel Henderson.

== Professional career ==
=== Arizona Cardinals ===
On May 5, 2015, Crisp was signed by the Arizona Cardinals as an undrafted free agent. On September 1, 2015, he was released by the Cardinals. On September 7, 2015, Crisp was brought back to the team and was placed on the practice squad. On September 10, 2015, the Cardinals placed Crisp on the practice squad-injured reserve list.

On January 26, 2016, Crisp signed a futures contract with the Arizona Cardinals. On September 3, 2016, he was released by the Cardinals.

=== New Orleans Saints ===
On December 7, 2016, Crisp was signed to the Saints' practice squad.
