= Kevin Grady =

American football player (born 1986)

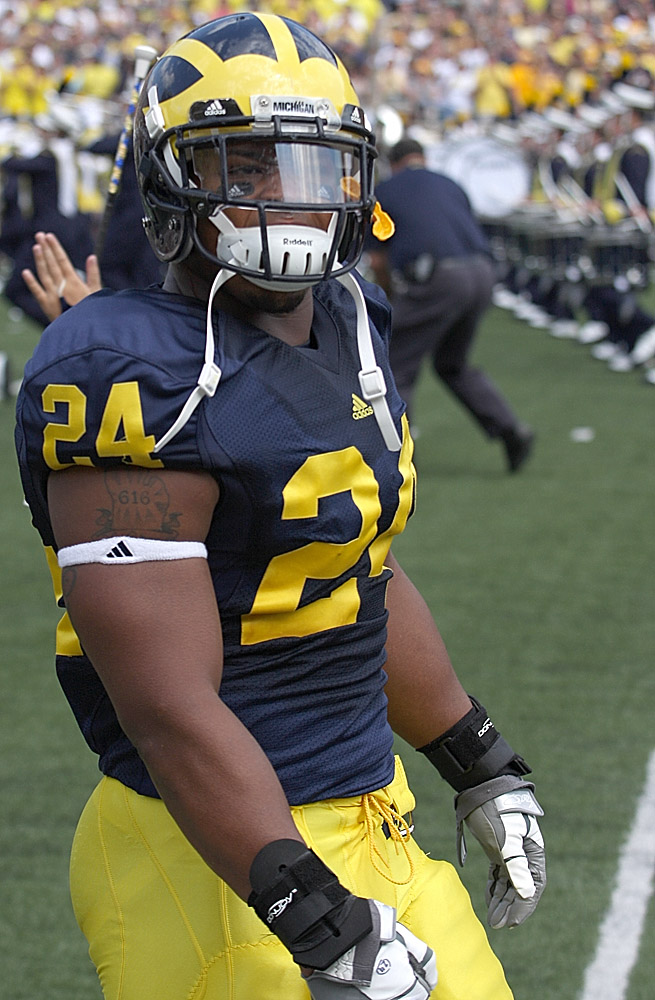
- Grady with the Michigan Wolverines in 2009

No. 24
- Position: Running back

Personal information
- Born: June 24, 1986 (age 40); Ada, Michigan, U.S.
- Listed height: 5 ft 9 in (1.75 m)
- Listed weight: 216 lb (98 kg)

Career information
- High school: East Grand Rapids (East Grand Rapids, Michigan)
- College: Michigan
- NFL draft: 2010: undrafted

Career history
- Chicago Slaughter (2011)

Awards and highlights
- EA Sports National Junior Player of the Year (2003); ESPN RISE National High School Junior Player of the Year (2003); Michigan High School Athletic Association records; Career rushing yards (8,431, 2004–) Career touchdowns (151, 2004–) Career points (924, 2004–) Career rushing attempts (1,154, 2004–) Consecutive 100-yard rushing games (24, 2004–09)

Kevin Lee Grady, Jr. (born June 24, 1986) is an American former football player. He completed his athletic eligibility for the Michigan Wolverines football team during the 2009 NCAA Division I FBS football season. He began his Michigan career as a tailback, but was converted to fullback. He has also played for the Chicago Slaughter of the Indoor Football League.

In high school, he led his team to consecutive Michigan High School Athletic Association Championships. Along the way, he established numerous Michigan High School Athletic Association career football rushing records while playing for East Grand Rapids High School, many of which still stand. He was also widely regarded as the best junior class high school football player in the nation during the 2003 high school football season.

At the University of Michigan, he became the school's first athlete to graduate high school a semester early in order to participate in spring football practice. He was Mike Hart's backup at tailback during his first two years at Michigan. He missed his third year due to injury and returned to play fullback during his final two years of eligibility.

== High school career ==
Grady was born in Grand Rapids, Michigan. During high school, Grady was a four-year varsity starter at East Grand Rapids High School. There he earned many honors and achievements, including being named All-State and the title of EA Sports junior player of the year. He led East Grand Rapids to consecutive state Division 3 football championships. He was one of the top high school running backs in the nation in high school on par with Jonathan Stewart, Rashard Mendenhall, Marlon Lucky, Antone Smith and Jamaal Charles. He was a 5-star blue chip recruit ranked among the top five running backs in the nation according to both Scout.com and Rivals.com. He holds the following Michigan High School Athletic Association records:

- Most career rushing yards (8,431)
- Most career touchdowns (151)
- Most career points (924)
- Most career rushing attempts (1,154)

He formerly held the following record:

- Most consecutive games with 100 yards rushing (24)

Grady did not consider any other schools en route to signing with Michigan.

College recruiting
Name	Hometown	School	Height	Weight	40^{‡}	Commit date
Kevin Grady; RB	East Grand Rapids, Michigan	East Grand Rapids (MI)	5 ft 10 in (1.78 m)	227.5 lb (103.2 kg)	4.49	Sep 8, 2003
Kevin Grady; RB	Recruit ratings: Scout: Rivals: (NA)					
Overall recruit ranking: Scout: 5 (RB) Rivals: 22, 4 (RB), 1 (MI) ESPN: NA
Note: In many cases, Scout, Rivals, 247Sports, On3, and ESPN may conflict in their listings of height and weight.; In these cases, the average was taken. ESPN grades are on a 100-point scale.; Sources: "Michigan Football Commitments". Rivals.; "2005 Michigan Football Commits". Scout.; "ESPN". ESPN.; "Scout.com Team Recruiting Rankings". Scout.; "2005 Team Ranking". Rivals.com.

== College career ==
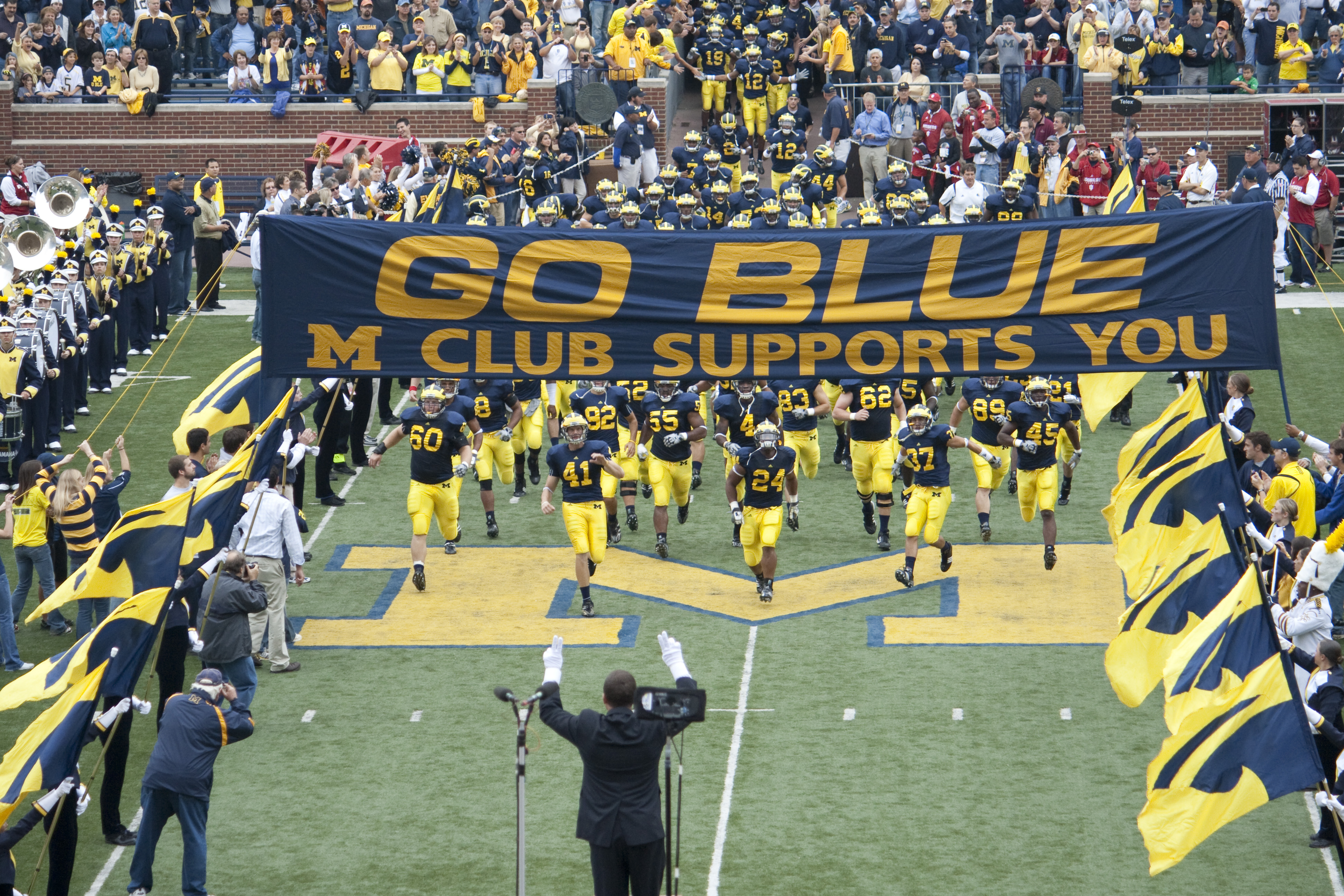
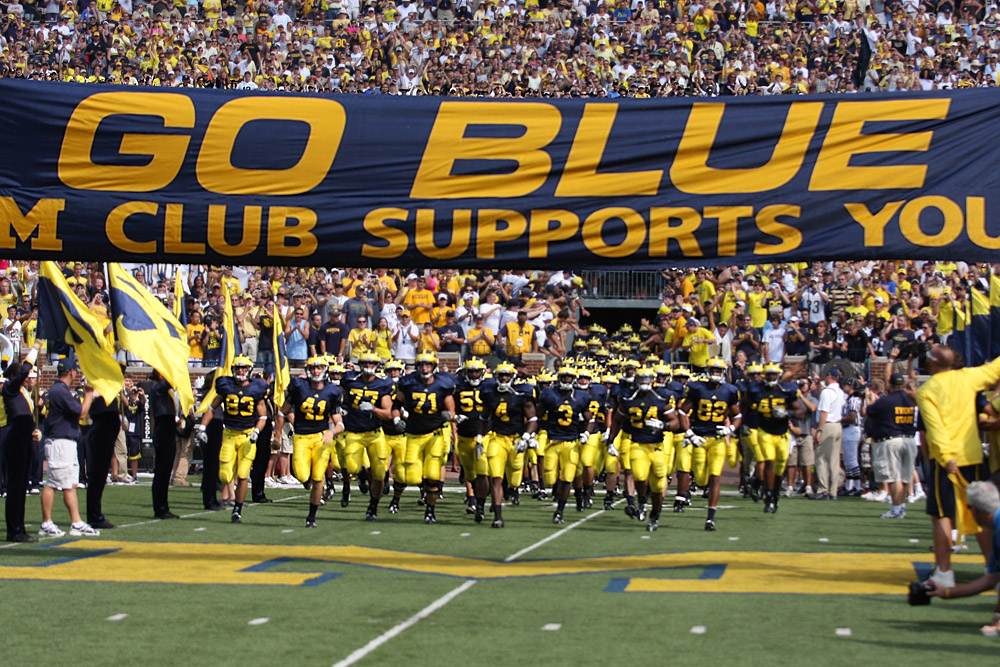
Grady led the 2009 Michigan Wolverines football team onto the field (above September 26 and below September 5).

Although football players had been enrolling early at Bowl Championship Series (BCS) programs for several years, Grady was the first University of Michigan football player to do so. In subsequent years several other players followed his lead, including Justin Boren and Carlos Brown the following year. By graduating high school early, he was able to attend the 2005 Rose Bowl and participate in 2005 Spring football practice.

=== Freshman year (2005) ===
As a freshman in 2005, Grady rushed 121 times for 483 yards and five touchdowns as a backup and injury replacement for starter Mike Hart, who only played in eight games due to injuries. Grady also caught 14 passes for 113 yards receiving. One of his touchdowns gave Michigan an 18–12 lead in the third quarter of the Ohio State game. In the end Grady made two starts at tailback, and was one of only six freshmen to have played for the 2005 Michigan Wolverines football team.

=== Sophomore year (2006) ===
Grady as a blocking fullback
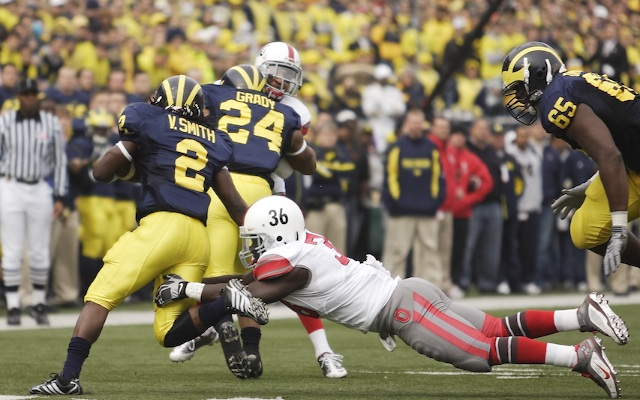
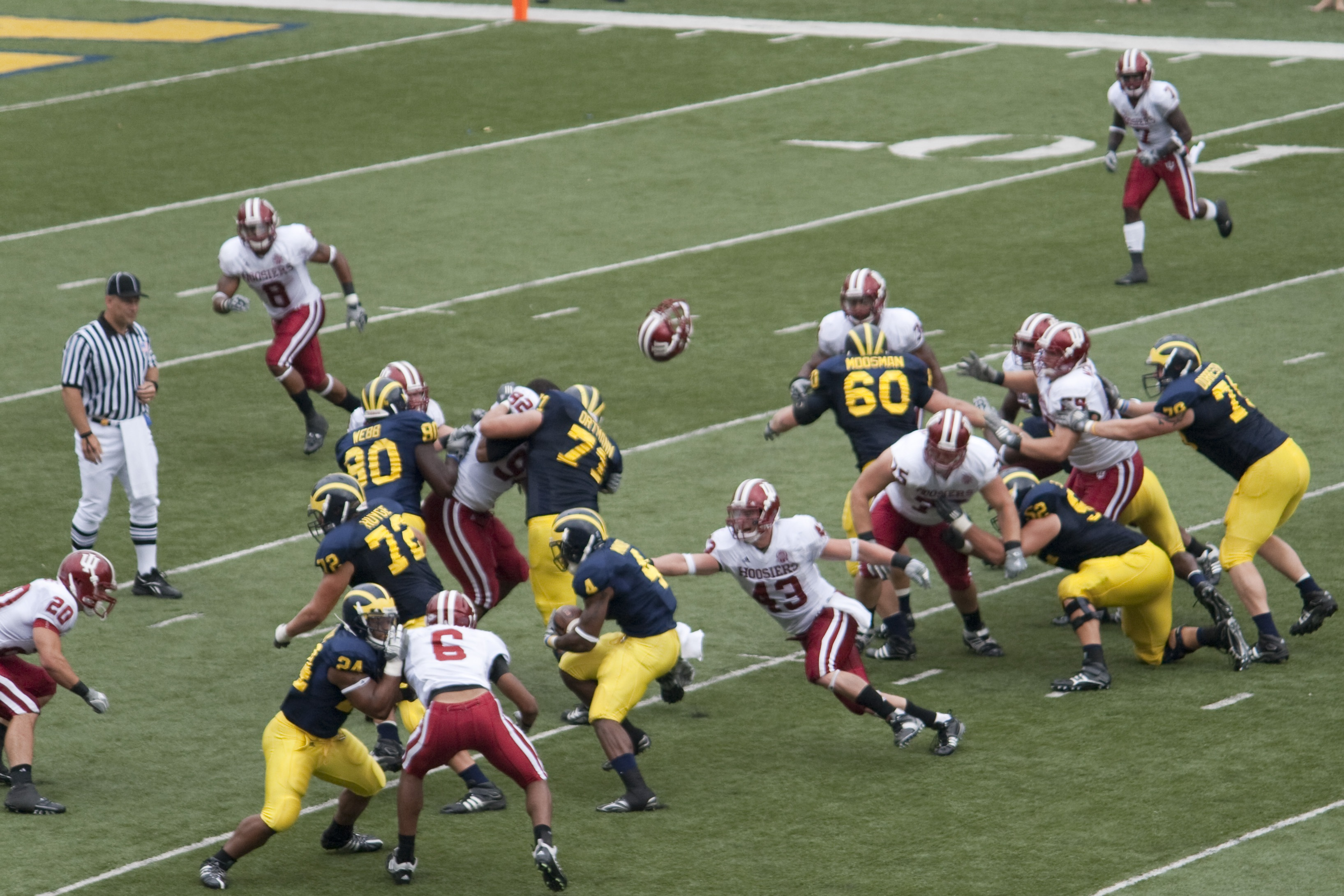
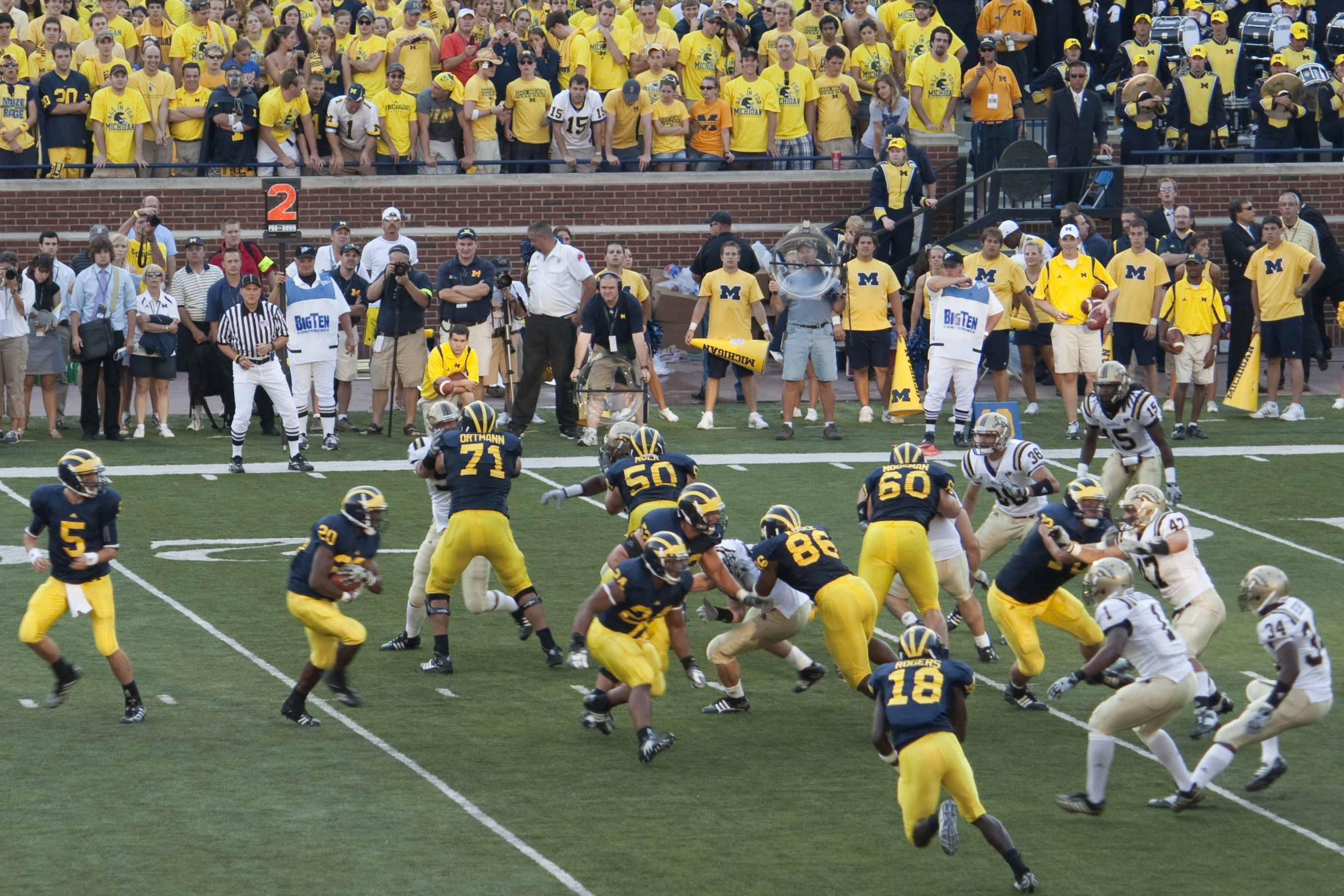
Top: Grady blocks for Vincent Smith as Brian Rolle attempts a tackle; Middle: Grady blocks for Brandon Minor along with Mark Huyge (72), Martell Webb (80), Mark Ortmann (71), David Moosman (60), Steven Schilling (52), and Perry Dorrestein (79); Bottom: Grady blocks for Michael Shaw (20) along with Mark Ortmann (71), David Molk (50), Mark Huyge (72), David Moosman (60), Steven Schilling (52), and Kevin Koger (86).

Based on his performance during 2006 spring practice, Grady received the John F. Maulbetsch Award. In 2006, he entered the season as Hart's primary backup, ahead of senior Jerome Jackson, freshmen Brandon Minor, and Carlos Brown on the depth chart. On opening day, Grady's five carries were second on the team, but some questioned why his total was so low. As the season progressed, he remained second on the depth chart, seeing limited playing time due to injuries as well as starter Mike Hart being healthy and starting all thirteen games. Grady rushed for 187 yards and three touchdowns on 55 carries and added one reception for eight yards. His net rushing yards from scrimmage ranked fourth on the 2006 Michigan Wolverines football team.

=== Junior year (2007) ===
Prior to spring football practice in 2007, Grady switched his jersey number from 3 to 24, his high school number and the day on which he was born. Later that year he was converted to fullback. During a scrimmage in early April, Grady tore his anterior cruciate ligament. On April 16, 2007, he had surgery. He would miss the entire 2007 season recovering from his injuries; by making use of a redshirt year, however, he was able to not use up a year of eligibility.

=== Junior (redshirt) year (2008) ===
In 2008, Rich Rodriguez replaced Lloyd Carr as head coach. During spring football, Grady was still recovering from injuries.

In July 2008, Grady was pulled over while driving in Wyoming, Michigan, with a blood alcohol content of .281, more than three times the state's legal limit. He originally pleaded not guilty. He began the 2008 season on suspension from the 2008 Wolverines, while Brown, Minor and freshmen Michael Shaw and Sam McGuffie fought for time. During the season, Grady pleaded guilty to misdemeanor drunken driving.

In early August, it appeared that juniors Brown and Minor would vie for the starting job because of Grady's suspension. With both Brown and Minor nursing injuries, Sam McGuffie was tentatively penciled into the starting position on the depth chart. In the end, Grady only accumulated 33 yards rushing for the season.

=== Senior (redshirt) year (2009) ===
In the spring of 2009, Grady was accused by court officials of not adhering to his probation reporting requirements and not meeting the 24 hours of community service requirement of his probation, among other violations. As a result, he was jailed for seven days in May 2009.

Kevin's brother, Kelvin Grady, was a point guard on the Michigan Wolverines men's basketball team before transferring to the Michigan football team after the 2008–09 season. On October 17, 2009, the two became the first pair of brothers to score a touchdown in the same game for Michigan as far as could be told by the school's record books. Over the course of the season, Kevin started three games at fullback for the 2009 Wolverines. He compiled 80 yards rushing on 10 carries bringing his career total to 783 yards on 200 carries and 10 touchdowns. He also made five receptions bringing his career total to 20 for 150 yards.

Grady was not selected in the 2010 NFL draft and was not an immediate undrafted free agent.

== Personal life ==
On November 26, 2010, Grady was arrested and charged again for driving under the influence after recording a .3 blood-alcohol level on a breathalyzer test. He is required to attend Alcoholics Anonymous meetings three times a week. On December 31, 2010, the Indoor Football League announced that the Chicago Slaughter had signed Grady. On May 11, 2011, four days after scoring six touchdowns for the Slaughter, Grady was sentenced to twenty days in jail for his November drunk driving offense. The sentence included two years of probation, 80 hours of community service, random drug tests, confinement to the state of Michigan until given leave by the judge, and 180 days of car immobilization. In addition, the sentence resulted in him being dropped from the Slaughter.
