= George Smith (American football coach) =

American football coach (born 1948)

Current position
- Title: Athletic Director
- Team: St. Thomas Aquinas HS (FL)

Biographical details
- Born: April 23, 1948 (age 78); Lafayette, Indiana
- Education: Purdue (1971)

Coaching career (HC unless noted)
- 1975-1992, 1995-2010: St. Thomas Aquinas HS (FL)

Head coaching record
- Overall: 361–66–0

Accomplishments and honors

Championships
- 6 FHSAA State Championships (1992, 1997, 1999, 2007, 2008, 2010); 2 National Championships (2008, 2010)

Awards
- 2008 USA Today Coach of the Year; 2009 AFCA Power of Influence Award

George F. Smith (born April 23, 1948) is an American football coach. He began as an assistant coach at St. Thomas Aquinas High School in Fort Lauderdale, Florida in 1972. He was named head coach in 1975 and in 34 years accumulated 361 wins and 6 state championships.
