= Larry Pickett =

American television show creator and executive producer (born 1978)

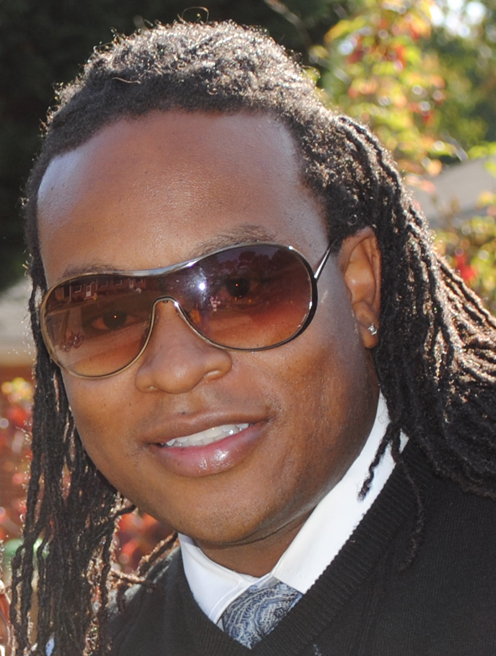
- Larry Pickett, Executive Producer, Host
- Born: December 27, 1978 (age 47); Queens, New York, U.S.
- Other name: LP
- Occupations: American television show creator, executive producer, host and editor

Larry Pickett (born December 27, 1978) is an American television show creator, executive producer, host and editor.

== Biography ==
Pickett attended Buffum Elementary in Long Beach. After moving to North Carolina, he attended Ligon Middle School and then Athens Drive High School in Raleigh. He participated in TV3, a television production class at Athens Drive, for four years and became Executive Producer during his junior and senior years. WRAL-TV5 produced a series on him called "College Bound" and followed him through his senior year, providing an update on him approximately every three months.

Pickett began his career in television at Community Television in Raleigh. While working as a cameraman on a live call-in TV show on Time Warner Cable, the host was absent one day. Ian Yack, the producer of the show, knew that Pickett had experience as a host and asked him to fill in, after which he was invited to be a co-host on the show. The crew parted ways a year and a half later.

Pickett produced the double disc CD "One Hot Minute: North Carolina Hip-Hop Compilation." He contributed to "Hip Hop Nation: Notes from the Underground", a television show produced by the Chapel Hill, North Carolina-based entertainment company Zoom Culture. The show, created by Kevin Thomas and Sue Herzog and sponsored by Universal Records, aired in over 25 million homes across the United States on various stations. It also aired overseas on MTV Base, and was released on DVD through a distribution deal with Xenon Pictures/Universal Music & Video Distribution.

"The Larry Pickett Show" aired on Raleigh Time Warner Cable Access. Pickett was also an on-air radio talent on WQOK-FM (K97.5) in Raleigh. According to Nielsen Media Research, his shows consistently earned high ratings in their time slots (Nielsen Media Research, DMA 29).

Pickett has interviewed WWE superstars, actors, comedians, and musicians, from Melissa Etheridge and P!nk to Babyface, DMX and Ludacris.

He has appeared on MTV, BET and Fox News Channel. Pickett has also been featured in national publications including Billboard Magazine, The Source Magazine, Vibe Magazine, Broadcasting & Cable Magazine and XXL Magazine as well as the cover story for Praxis Magazine.
