= Athens Drive High School =

Public school in North Carolina, United States

Athens Drive Magnet High School
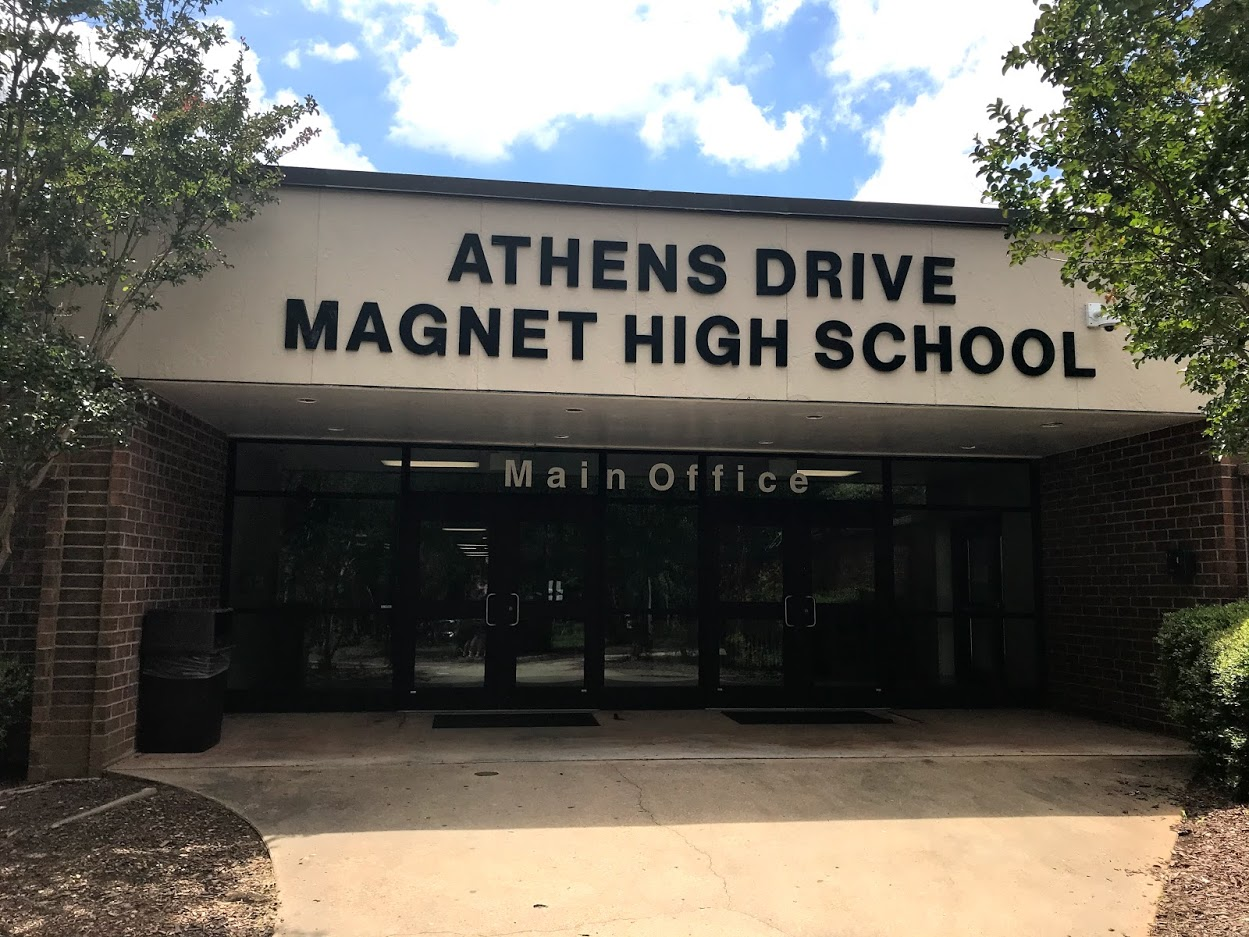
- Athens Drive High School main entrance in 2020

Location
- 1420 Athens Drive; Raleigh, North Carolina 27606; United States; 35.7687°N 78.7112°W

Information
- Type: Public
- Established: 1978 (48 years ago)
- School district: Wake County Public School System
- CEEB code: 343196
- Principal: Amanda Boshoff
- Teaching staff: 125.44 (FTE)
- Grades: 9–12
- Enrollment: 2,156 (2024–2025)
- Student to teacher ratio: 17.19
- Schedule type: 4x4 Block Schedule
- Colors: Blue and orange
- Athletics: NCHSAA 8A
- Athletics conference: CAP 8A
- Team name: Jaguars
- Rival: Cary High School
- Newspaper: Athens Oracle
- Yearbook: Athens Torch
- Website: Athens Drive Magnet High School

Athens Drive Magnet High School, formerly known as Athens Drive High School, is a secondary Wake County public high school in southwestern Raleigh, North Carolina, that serves grades 9–12. As of 2023–2024, the school has 2,062 enrolled students and approximately 127 hired educators. It is also part of the Wake County Public School System.

== History ==
Athens Drive High School (ADHS) was opened on September 5, 1978. ADHS was then dedicated on April 11, 1979. The first graduating class was in 1979.

Athens Drive High School was the first high school in Wake County built for school and community use. It was the first high school built after the merger of Wake County Schools and Raleigh City Schools. It was designed by architect F. Carter Williams and his brother Turner G. Williams. The price tag of the ADHS building was $7.1 million. At the time, ADHS was the largest and most expensive high school built in North Carolina. The City of Raleigh paid $425,000 to construct Williams Stadium. Athens Drive is considered a small 4A school by NC standards. Originally, before the Jaguars were decided as the mascot for the school, the Owl was going to be the school's mascot.

In 1989, controversy surrounded the appointment of Paul J. Puryear, who was white, to replace Johnny Farmer, who was then one of two black high school principals in Wake County. In 1991, after R. Walter Sherlin was chosen to replace Puryear as another white principal, board member Dr. Holland walked out of the room in protest.

The school underwent a major refurbishment during the 2001–02 school year. A new wing was added to the school, originally called the Freshman Academy Wing, built specifically for freshman classes, but the name was later removed and the wing is now used for math and science classes for all grades. The main entrance was also moved. While the refurbishments occurred, all ADHS students were assigned to Middle Creek High School for the 2001–02 school year, which had not opened yet for its own students. The refurbished ADHS reopened in the fall of 2002.

In 2014 James "Jim" Hedrick, previously of Green Hope High School, became principal of Athens Drive. The school community paid tribute to him after he died on August 2, 2016. Hedrick and his wife Camille, then the principal of Panther Creek High School, had moved to North Carolina due to proximity to family members and since his wife is a local. Stephen Mares replaced Dr. James Hedrick, after his death.

In September 2015, Athens Drive was selected by WCPSS to become a magnet school, starting from the 2016–17 school year.

In 2021, Athens Drive became the first school in Wake County to obtain solar panels. The 12 solar panels were acquired from a NC GreenPower Solar+ Schools non-profit grant.

In 2022, Stephen Mares announced his retirement on March 24, 2022, due to minor health issues, wanting to spend more time with family, and the want for a more consistent lifestyle/routine. With input from the school community, the Board of Education named Amanda Boshoff to be the new principal of Athens Drive beginning August 1, 2023. In her introductory email, Amanda stated, "As both a parent and long-time resident of the Athens Drive base community, this opportunity is even more meaningful for me"- referring to her two children and students of Athens Drive, Willem and Stella Boshoff.

In 2022, Wake County Public School System announced that Athens Drive Magnet High School would be one of 8 schools to undergo major renovations in their recent initiatives. The speculated renovation budget for the school is $50 million. The design phase is expected to start in September 2023, and the design is expected to be complete by January 2026. Construction is then scheduled to begin July 2026, with students returning to occupy the building in September 2028.

=== List of principals ===
Principal	Term start	Term end
M. Grant Batey	1979	1981
John I. Farmer	1981	1989
Paul J. Puryear	1989	1991
R. Walter Sherlin	1991	1998
Kathryn L. Chontos	1998	2005
William Crockett	2006	2013
Charles Langley (interim)	2014	2014
James Hedrick	2014	2016
Kathryn L. Chontos (interim)	2016	2016
Stephen Mares	2016	2023
Amanda Boshoff	2023	Present

== School profile ==
As of the 2023–2024 school year, there were 2,062 students, a combination of 848 White, 513 Black, 452 Hispanic, 158 Asian, and 4 American Indian as well as 87 who were two or more races. 937 students were eligible for the state's free or reduced lunch program. Athens Drive High School offers the following AP courses: Biology, Calculus AB, Calculus BC, Chemistry, Computer Science Principles, Computer Science, Environmental Science, European History, Human Geography, Language and Composition, Literature and Composition, Physics 1, Physics 2, Psychology, Spanish Language and Culture, Statistics, Studio Art: 2-D Design, Studio Art: 3-D Design, United States Government and Politics, and United States History.

The school also had a Child Development Center called Baby Jags, which served 3- and 4-year-olds prior to their enrollment in kindergarten. It was shut down after the 2017–2018 school year. The classroom now houses the school's Animal Science program.

Athens Drive is a Wake County STEM High School. The school offers two STEM (Science, Technology, Engineering, and Math) academies: the STEM Academy of Energy and Sustainability, established in 2012, and the Health Science Academy, which was established in 1990, and is the basis for the magnification for the school, Athens Drive Magnet High School: Center for Medical Sciences and Global Health Initiatives.

Athens Drive is a Community School in the Wake County Public School System. There are night classes for adults offered all year and a community library that is open to the public.

Athens Drive operates on a 4x4 semester block schedule.

== Fine arts ==
Athens Drive offers a variety of instrumental, drama, vocal and visual art, as well as leadership development and community service. The school contains two art studios, a printing graphics studio and a yearbook/computer art studio. The Performing Arts facilities include the 1,000-seat auditorium, 150-seat choral room, 200-seat band room, and tech shops.

The band room is able to hold the marching band for rehearsals. The room features large stadium-style risers, two instrument storage rooms (percussion and marching horns) and low brass stations. The music library houses over 25,000 volumes of band, orchestra and choral literature and also serves as the storage library for the NC Band Masters Association's Central District's festival music. The current band director is Mr. Lucas Meade with assistant band director Ms. Lorena Schakel.

The chorus room features large stadium-style risers and contains a supplemental music library, offices, and storage rooms for equipment. In March 2010, the symphonic band performed at the "Music For All" National Festival, sponsored by Bands Of America. The Wind Ensemble performed at the 2010 NC Music Educators Conference. In March 2014, the Wind Ensemble will travel to New York City and perform a concert at Carnegie Hall at the National Band and Orchestra Festival. They will perform a 30-minute concert for a panel of internationally known wind band conductors and composers. The band was chosen based on their past superior performance records and their appearances in the "Music for All" National Festival and at the NC Music Educators Conference.

The theatre department won the Marchael Bayne Best Musical Award in 2019 for their musical All Shook Up. They also received four other nominations for 'Best Ensemble', two for 'Best Actor', and one for 'Best Actress.' The previous year they were nominated for their musical In The Heights for 'Best Ensemble', two for 'Best Actress' and one for 'Best Actor.'

In the 2021-2022 School year, the ADHS theatre department put on Antigone Now & In Juliet's Garden in the fall of 2021, a play combining two popular productions. In the Spring, Athens performed Beehive the 60's Musical, a female empowering, musical tribute to the women who made the music of the 1960's era.

In the 2022-2023 School year, the ADHS theatre department put on Grim and Gruesome Grimm in the fall of 2022, a play showcasing the dark stories written by the Grimm Brothers in the early 1800s that replicated famous fairy tales. In the Spring, Athens performed Seussical the Musical, where Triangle Rising Stars recognised student Timire Leak as a finalist for best actor for his performance of Horton in the show. Athens Drive was also awarded Best Student Orchestra for Seussical the Musical.

== Athletics ==
Athens Drive is a member of the North Carolina High School Athletic Association (NCHSAA) and are classified as an 8A school. The Jaguars compete in the CAP 8A Conference. Athens Drive offers the following sports:

- Baseball
- Basketball (Men's and Women's)
- Cheerleading
- Cross Country
- Dance
- Football
- Golf (Men's and Women's)
- Gymnastics
- Lacrosse (Men's and Women's)
- Soccer (Men's and Women's)
- Softball
- Swimming and Diving (Men's and Women's)
- Track and Field – Indoor & Outdoor (Men's and Women's)
- Tennis (Men's and Women's)
- Volleyball
- Wrestling

=== Athletic facilities ===
The facilities of Athens Drive Athletics include:

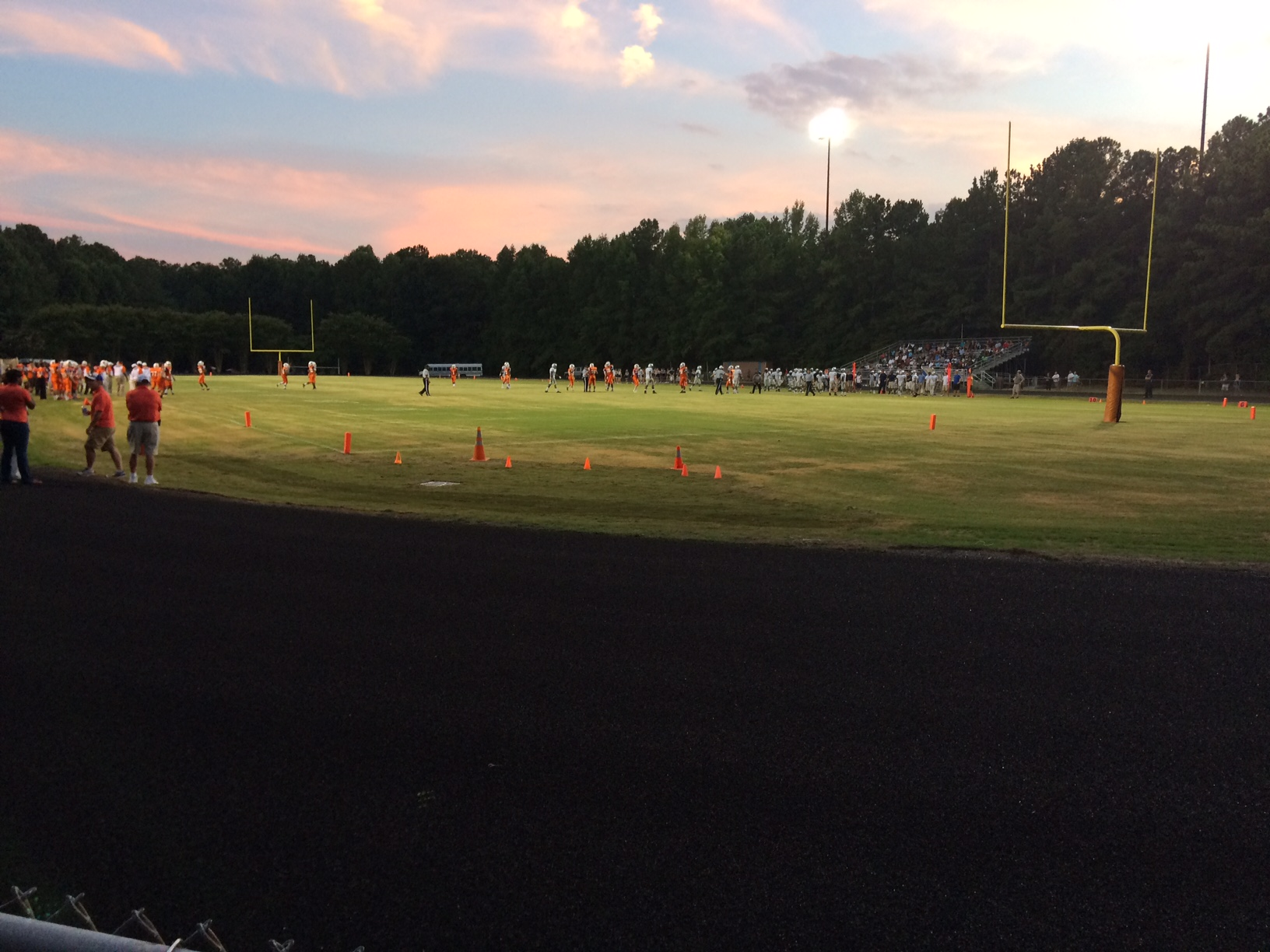
Williams Stadium during a varsity football game

- Peter Hines Williams Memorial Stadium: This 2,500-seat stadium is currently home to the track team and was, until 2016, home to the football, soccer, and lacrosse teams, as well as the ADHS Cheerleaders and Marching Jaguars. Williams Stadium is often the site for regional track meets, soccer and lacrosse playoff games and community events. The stadium features a rubberized track service, restrooms, concessions, press box, overflow capacity setting and a sound and lighting system.
- Jaguar Stadium: The Jaguar Stadium is home to the football, soccer, and lacrosse teams, opened in 2016.
- Tennis Courts: The 6-court tennis park is home to the men's and Women's tennis teams, as well as the Annual North Carolina Games. The Tennis Courts are named the Alicia Jones Tennis Courts in honor of Alicia Jones who was a math teacher who died from Leukemia in 2007.
- Athens Drive Baseball Stadium: The baseball stadium was constructed along with the original school building. It has bleacher seating for over 300 fans, a press box and concessions. It is located behind the school, near Lake Johnson Pool and behind the area of the new stadium under construction.
- Softball Stadium: Home of the Lady Jags Softball team.
- ADHS Jaguar Gymnasium: The main gym (upper gym) is home to the basketball, wrestling and volleyball teams, and features bleachers for 1,500. Concessions and gift shops are located in the large lobby outside. Scoring and lighting systems were updated in 2005, and the sound system was updated in 2015.
- Lower Gym: Originally the home of the wrestling team, the older gym is used today as a practice facility for all sports. Showers, lockers, football equipment rooms, officials and training rooms are located adjacent to the gym, as well as the ADHS Medical Trainer rooms. The Gym also serves as practice facilities for the Cheer squads and Marching Colorguard and Winterguard.
- Practice Facilities: Athens Drive has several practice facilities ready for its various teams. The women's Lacrosse teams practice on fields located by the Softball pitch, and the Softball team uses practice cages nearby. Two large practice fields near the Baseball stadium are used by football and Men's soccer during the fall and Men's Lacrosse and Women's soccer during the spring. Located at the bottom of Jaguar Park Drive opposite Williams Memorial Stadium is the Band Practice field, used by the Marching Jaguars and the Cross Country team in the fall and the Lacrosse, Baseball, and Track teams in the spring. Lake Johnson Park, located next to Athens Drive High, also is used by Cross Country and Track.
- Auditorium: The school auditorium has 1,000 audience seats, and a small concession stand by the main doors of the Gym lobby. Backstage, the auditorium has a separate construction workshop and a manual fly system. The auditorium also has a tech booth, with lighting & sound operating equipment.

== Notable alumni ==
- Brian Ackley, professional soccer player
- Nazmi Albadawi, Major League Soccer (MLS) player, also represents the Palestine national football team
- Adam Armour, professional soccer player
- Shaker Asad, former MLS and USL First Division player
- Bobbi Baker, actress who played Kiki in Tyler Perry's House of Payne
- Rob Crisp, NFL offensive tackle
- Steven Curfman, MLS player and member of United States U-17 and United States U-20 national soccer teams
- Josh Davis, professional basketball player
- Kevin Donnalley, NFL player and 2003 NFC champion with the Carolina Panthers
- Donald Evans, NFL defensive end
- Markeisha Gatling, WNBA player
- Lex Gillette, Paralympic athlete and medalist
- Josh Hamilton, 5x MLB All-Star selection and first overall pick in the 1999 MLB draft
- Barbara Jackson, former North Carolina Supreme Court Justice
- Roy Lassiter, MLS player and member of the United States men's national soccer team
- Peter R. McCullough, astronomer and founder of the XO Project
- Ariel McDonald, professional basketball player who played in the EuroLeague; 2000 Israeli Basketball Premier League MVP
- Larry Pickett, television show creator, executive producer, host, and editor
