= Seantrel Henderson =

American gridiron football player (born 1992)

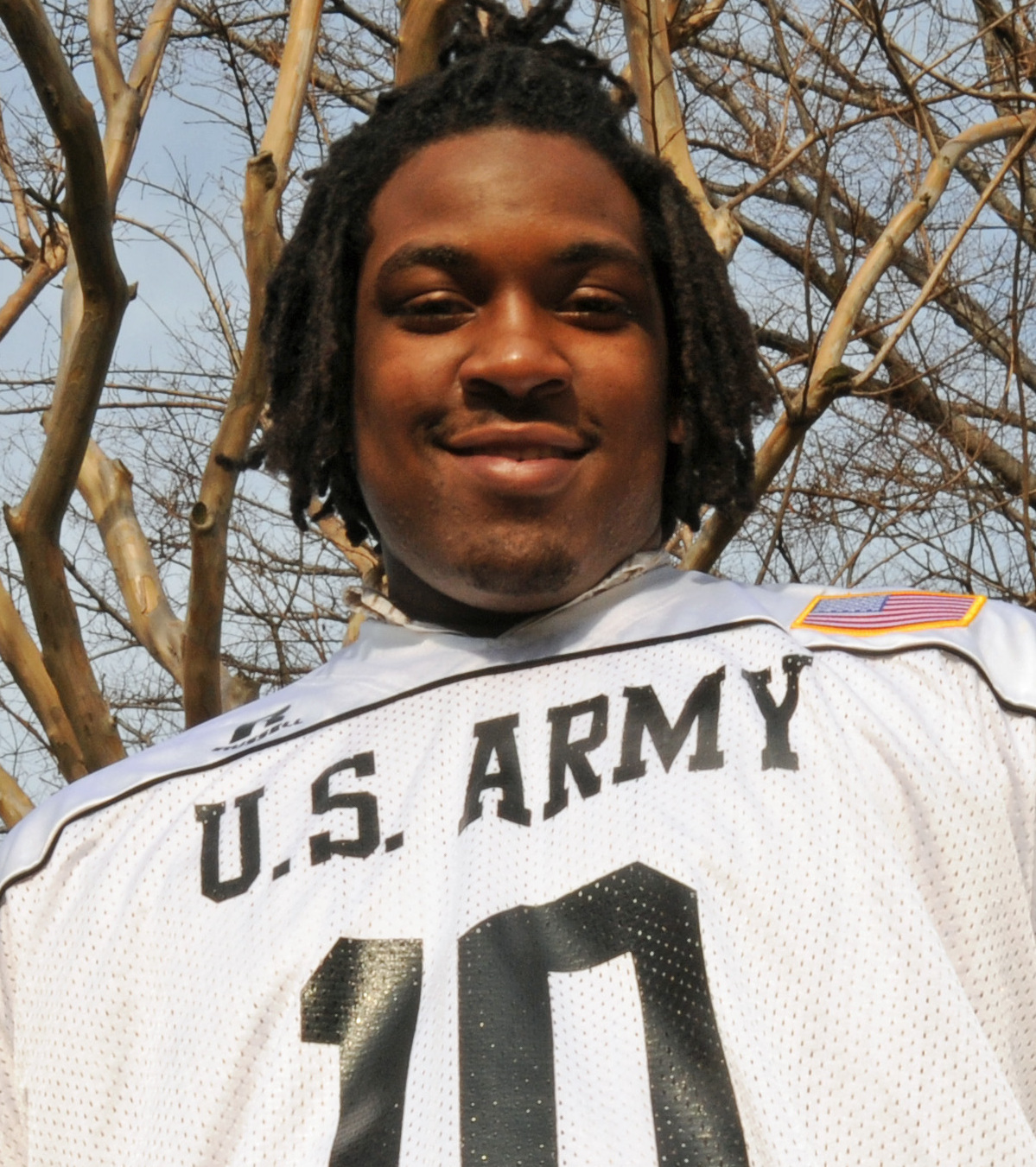
- Henderson in 2009

No. 66, 76
- Position: Offensive tackle

Personal information
- Born: January 21, 1992 (age 34); Minneapolis, Minnesota, U.S.
- Listed height: 6 ft 7 in (2.01 m)
- Listed weight: 351 lb (159 kg)

Career information
- High school: Cretin-Derham Hall (Saint Paul, Minnesota)
- College: Miami (FL)
- NFL draft: 2014: 7th round, 237th overall pick

Career history
- Buffalo Bills (2014–2017); Houston Texans (2018–2019); Saskatchewan Roughriders (2021)*
- * Offseason or practice squad member only

Awards and highlights
- Freshman All-American (2010)

Career NFL statistics
- Games played: 39
- Games started: 29
- Stats at Pro Football Reference

Seantrel Henderson (born January 21, 1992) is an American former professional football player who was an offensive tackle in the National Football League (NFL). He was selected by the Buffalo Bills in the seventh round of the 2014 NFL draft. He played college football for the Miami Hurricanes.

Henderson attended Cretin-Derham Hall High School and originally signed a letter of intent to play college football for the USC Trojans, but was granted release from his commitment by Coach Lane Kiffin in July 2010 and eventually committed to Miami.

== Early life ==
Henderson was considered the top overall player in his class by a number of recruiting services; Rivals.com named him their 2008 Junior of the Year, while USA Today named him to their All-American First-Team as one of only two juniors. Henderson made the All-USA team in 2009 again, and was also named Offensive Player of the Year, the first lineman to do so in the 28-year history of the award. Tom Lemming called him "a cross between Jonathan Ogden and Orlando Pace," two of the best offensive tackles in the NFL in the 2000s; Sports Illustrated called him "probably the most polished lineman of the past decade".

He was also featured in a July 2008 issue of Sports Illustrated, profiling young athletes poised to star in their sports, alongside Taylor Hall and Jeremy Tyler.

In 2009, Henderson helped Cretin-Derham Hall to a 5A state championship and was named Minnesota Player of the Year by the Associated Press. It's believed to be the first time the annual award has gone to a lineman.

A two-sport star, Henderson also played basketball. He played for the "Howard Pulley Panthers" on the AAU circuit alongside Harrison Barnes, one of the nation's top basketball prospects. Henderson also threw shot put and discus and won the 1,500 meter race walk, shot put, and discus in the USATF 2004 Minnesota Junior Olympics Outdoor Championships.

=== Recruiting ===
After unofficial visits to Minnesota, Iowa, Wisconsin, Michigan and Michigan State, he acknowledged that Michigan was his early favorite. In the summer of 2009, Henderson took unofficial visits to Florida State, Florida, Ohio State, Tennessee, Southern California, and UCLA. At that point, Notre Dame, USC, Ohio State and Michigan were mentioned as leading contenders. Henderson's former Cretin-Derham Hall teammate Michael Floyd was playing for the Notre Dame Fighting Irish.

Henderson scheduled his fifth and final official recruiting visit to the University of Miami for the 2010 Pro Bowl weekend in late January. He had already made official visits to USC, Ohio State, Notre Dame, and Florida.

Henderson announced his college decision on Tom Lemming's television show on CBS College Sports on National Signing Day. He verbally committed to the Trojans, but did not sign his letter of intent until after USC went before the NCAA infractions committee on February 19 to respond to allegations relating to a scandal involving Heisman Trophy-winning tailback Reggie Bush. Henderson finally signed his letter of intent on March 22, 2010. When the NCAA rendered its decision banning USC from postseason play for two years and imposing severe scholarship reductions, Henderson asked to be released from his commitment to USC. Henderson was released from his commitment to USC on July 6, 2010.

On July 9, 2010, Henderson announced his decision to attend the University of Miami, which had always been his "second choice", according to his father.

== College career ==
As a true freshman at Miami, Henderson played 12 games (including 9 starts) and saw most of his action at right tackle. Henderson earned All-Freshman selections by the Football Writers Association of America, College Football News, Phil Steele, and Rivals.com.

In 2011, Henderson played in eight games and earned two starts after recovering from off-season back surgery. In March 2012, Henderson was suspended for the first weekend of spring practice for violating team policy. The team also announced that he would not play in the opening game of the 2012 season against Maryland.

On August 1, 2012, Henderson was involved in a car accident while driving to a friend's funeral in which the Chevy Impala he was driving ran a red light and crashed into a car carrying a family of six. Two children in the car were transported to the hospital. Henderson received a concussion. Henderson was cited for driving with an expired license and running a red light. Henderson missed the first twelve Miami Hurricane practices while recovering from the concussion.

In the 2012 season, Henderson started seven games at right tackle for the Hurricanes. He was an honorable mention on the All-Atlantic Coast Conference team. Henderson opted to remain at Miami rather than make himself eligible for the 2013 NFL draft.

After the 2013 season, Henderson was once again named an honorable mention on the All-Atlantic Coast Conference team. He was demoted to backup for three games and suspended for one.

Henderson was invited to the 2014 Senior Bowl. Before the game, he admitted that marijuana use led to his three suspensions from the University of Miami football team. "I'm just being honest with every (NFL) team and letting them know exactly what the situations were, and that I'm putting all the negative things behind me moving on to the next level," he said. "I want to be a starter and play in the NFL."

== Professional career ==
Pre-draft measurables
Height	Weight	Arm length	Hand span	40-yard dash	10-yard split	20-yard split	20-yard shuttle	Three-cone drill	Vertical jump	Broad jump	Wonderlic
6 ft 7 1/8 in (2.01 m)	331 lb (150 kg)	34 5/8 in (0.88 m)	10 1/2 in (0.27 m)	5.04 s	1.74 s	2.92 s	4.77 s	8.15 s	24 in (0.61 m)	7 ft 11 in (2.41 m)	15
All values from NFL Combine

=== Buffalo Bills ===
The Buffalo Bills selected Henderson in the seventh round (237th overall) of the 2014 NFL draft.

In his rookie season in 2014, Henderson started all 16 games at right tackle. He was a standout as a rookie as he led all NFL players in performance-based pay.

In 2015, Henderson missed the final three games of the season after he was diagnosed with Crohn's disease.

In 2016, Henderson underwent surgery and another operation to remove all infected areas and reattach his intestines before announcing that he would return to the team. Henderson was suspended for the first four games of the 2016 NFL season for violating the league's substance abuse policy. On November 29, 2016, Henderson was suspended 10 games for a second violation of the NFL's policy and substance abuse program. Henderson admitted that he used marijuana to deal with the pain from his Crohn's disease and the two intestinal surgeries from earlier in the year.

=== Houston Texans ===
On March 15, 2018, Henderson signed a one-year contract with the Houston Texans. Henderson started Week 1 at right tackle against the New England Patriots, however left the game with an ankle injury. He was diagnosed with a broken ankle and was placed on injured reserve on September 12, 2018.

On January 19, 2019, Henderson signed a one-year contract extension with the Texans.

On October 16, 2019, the Texans placed Henderson on the reserve/non-football injury list with a back injury. He was released on November 18.

=== Saskatchewan Roughriders ===
Henderson signed with the Saskatchewan Roughriders on February 8, 2021. He was placed on the reserve/suspended list on July 24, 2021, and released on February 14, 2023.
