= Martell Webb =

American football player (born 1989)

No. 48, 80
- Position: Tight end

Personal information
- Born: November 10, 1989 (age 37); Pontiac, Michigan, U.S.
- Listed height: 6 ft 3 in (1.91 m)
- Listed weight: 276 lb (125 kg)

Career information
- High school: Pontiac Northern
- College: Michigan
- NFL draft: 2011: undrafted

Career history
- Philadelphia Eagles (2011)*; New York Jets (2011)*; Tampa Bay Buccaneers (2011)*; Arizona Cardinals (2012)*; Indianapolis Colts (2012)*; Tennessee Titans (2012−2013)*; Detroit Lions (2013)*; Indianapolis Colts (2013–2014)*; Cleveland Browns (2014)*
- * Offseason or practice squad member only
- Stats at Pro Football Reference

Martell T. Webb (born November 10, 1989) is an American former football tight end. He played his college football for the Michigan Wolverines football team. He was previously a highly rated tight end and wide receiver for Pontiac Northern High School who was selected to the 2006 USA Today All-USA second-team.

He was a member of the Philadelphia Eagles, New York Jets, Tampa Bay Buccaneers, Arizona Cardinals, Indianapolis Colts, Tennessee Titans, Detroit Lions, and Cleveland Browns.

== High school ==
Webb was rated the 17th best high school football tight end in the class of 2007 by Scout.com. He was rated as the 29th and 56th best wide receiver by Rivals.com and ESPN.com. He was selected to the 2006 USA Today All-USA second-team as a tight end along with fellow Michigan matriculant Ryan Mallett.

College recruiting
Name	Hometown	School	Height	Weight	40^{‡}	Commit date
Martell Webb; WR/TE	Pontiac, Michigan	Northern (MI)	6 ft 5 in (1.96 m)	217.5 lb (98.7 kg)	4.65	May 2, 2006
Martell Webb; WR/TE	Recruit ratings: Scout: Rivals: (77)					
Overall recruit ranking: Scout: 17 (TE) Rivals: 29 (WR), 12 (MI) ESPN: 56 (WR)
Note: In many cases, Scout, Rivals, 247Sports, On3, and ESPN may conflict in their listings of height and weight.; In these cases, the average was taken. ESPN grades are on a 100-point scale.; Sources: "Michigan Football Commitments". Rivals.; "2007 Michigan Football Commits". Scout.; "ESPN". ESPN.; "Scout.com Team Recruiting Rankings". Scout.; "2007 Team Ranking". Rivals.com.

== College ==
During his Michigan career, he posted a total of 9 receptions for 111 yards and 2 touchdowns as well as 3 special teams tackles. He started three games during his career, backing up Kevin Koger, Mike Massey and Carson Butler. His touchdown in the October 9, 2010 against Michigan State in the Paul Bunyan Trophy game gave Michigan its final lead of the game.

== Professional career ==
Pre-draft measurables
Height	Weight	40-yard dash	10-yard split	20-yard split	20-yard shuttle	Three-cone drill	Vertical jump	Broad jump	Bench press
6 ft 2 7/8 in (1.90 m)	276 lb (125 kg)	4.79 s	1.73 s	2.72 s	4.69 s	7.45 s	29.5 in (0.75 m)	8 ft 8 in (2.64 m)	21 reps
All values from Pro Day

On July 26, 2011, he was signed by the Philadelphia Eagles. He posted one reception in the August 11 preseason game against the Baltimore Ravens. He was released by the Eagles on August 29. He worked out with the Denver Broncos. He was signed by the New York Jets on September 27 and released on October 4. He was signed to the Tampa Bay Buccaneers practice squad on December 7, 2011, and released on December 19. On January 5, 2012, Webb signed a 'reserve/future' contract with the Arizona Cardinals. He was released from the team on August 31, 2012. On November 13, 2012, he was signed to the Indianapolis Colts' practice squad, but the team released him on December 4.

On December 12, the Tennessee Titan's signed Webb to its practice squad. On August 26, 2013, he was waived by the Titans. He was signed by the Lions and assigned to the practice squad on November 5, 2013. The Lions released him on November 19. On November 28, he was signed to the practice squad by the Indianapolis Colts.

Webb signed with the Cleveland Browns on August 5, 2014. The Browns released Webb on August 25, 2014.
