= 2009 Michigan Wolverines football team =

American college football season

2009 Michigan Wolverines football

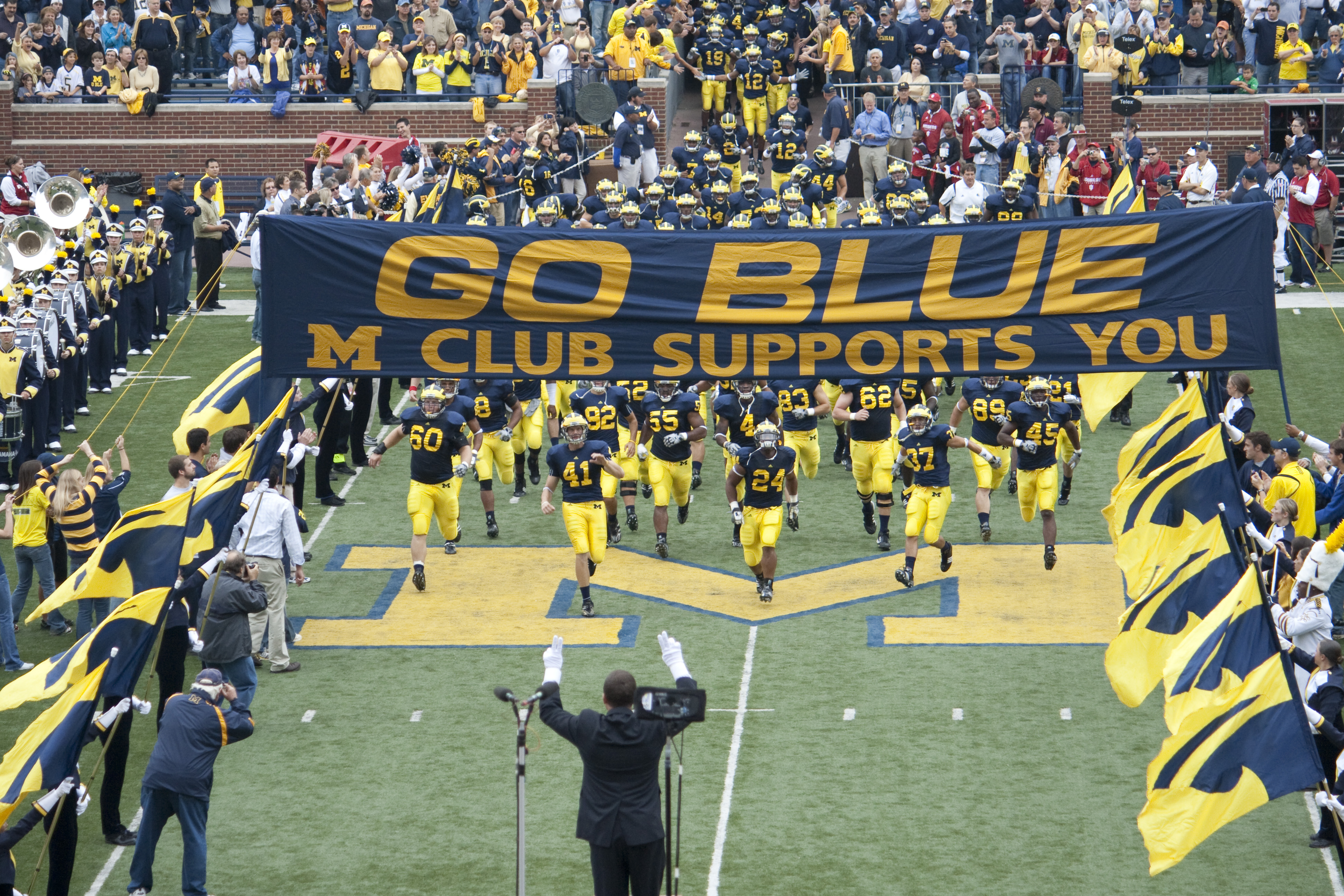
- Conference: Big Ten Conference
- Record: 5–7 (1–7 Big Ten)
- Head coach: Rich Rodriguez (2nd season)
- Offensive coordinator: Calvin Magee (2nd season)
- Offensive scheme: Spread option
- Defensive coordinator: Greg Robinson (1st season)
- Base defense: Multiple
- MVP: Brandon Graham
- Captains: Stevie Brown; Brandon Graham; Zoltan Mesko; Mark Ortmann
- Home stadium: Michigan Stadium

2009 Big Ten Conference football standings
| | Conf. | | | Overall |
| Team | W | | L | W | | L |
|---|---|---|---|---|---|---|
| No. 5 Ohio State $ | 7 | – | 1 | 11 | – | 2 |
| No. 7 Iowa % | 6 | – | 2 | 11 | – | 2 |
| No. 9 Penn State | 6 | – | 2 | 11 | – | 2 |
| Northwestern | 5 | – | 3 | 8 | – | 5 |
| No. 16 Wisconsin | 5 | – | 3 | 10 | – | 3 |
| Michigan State | 4 | – | 4 | 6 | – | 7 |
| Purdue | 4 | – | 4 | 5 | – | 7 |
| Minnesota | 3 | – | 5 | 6 | – | 7 |
| Illinois | 2 | – | 6 | 3 | – | 9 |
| Michigan | 1 | – | 7 | 5 | – | 7 |
| Indiana | 1 | – | 7 | 4 | – | 8 |
$ – BCS representative as conference champion; % – BCS at-large representative; Rankings from AP Poll

The 2009 Michigan Wolverines football team represented the University of Michigan in the 2009 NCAA Division I FBS football season. They played their home games at Michigan Stadium in Ann Arbor, Michigan and competed in the Big Ten Conference. The team attempted to rebound from its worst season (loss wise) in its 130-year football history and succeeded at first, starting the season 4–0 and earning a No. 20 ranking in the polls. Over the final eight games the Wolverines went 1–7 however, ending the season with a 5–7 record and failing to qualify for a bowl game for the second straight year. 2008 and 2009 were Michigan's first back-to-back sub-.500 seasons since 1962 and 1963; they also failed to win a road game for the first time since 1962.

However, several individuals excelled. Brandon Graham received numerous post-season accolades including Chicago Tribune Silver Football as conference co-MVP, several first and second team 2009 College Football All-America Team selections, and the 2010 Senior Bowl MVP. Graham was the national statistical champion in tackles for a loss (TFL) and the repeat Big Ten Champion. Zoltan Mesko also received several second team All-American recognitions and was a first team Academic All-American. Mesko was the Big Ten punting average statistical champion. After the season, co-captains Graham, Mesko and leading tackler Stevie Brown were drafted in the 2010 NFL draft and immediately after the draft Donovan Warren signed as an undrafted free agent.

== Preseason ==
In 2008 the Michigan Wolverines had possibly the worst season in the history of the program. The team finished with a 3–9 regular season record, failing to qualify for a postseason bowl game for the first time in 33 years. The Wolverines struggled to implement first-year head coach Rich Rodriguez's spread option offense; Michigan was last in the Big Ten in passing offense, scoring offense, total offense and turnover margin.

Going into 2009, there was optimism that Michigan, led by newly recruited mobile quarterback Tate Forcier, would be able to turn things around and have a winning season, or at the very least win their opening game for the first time since 2006. The team had 10 returning offensive starters and 5 returning defensive starters. Although to some Forcier was a foregone conclusion as the starting quarterback, the battle between him, incumbent Nick Sheridan, and Denard Robinson was anticipated to be the most competitive position battle in the Big Ten Conference according to College Football News. Although the 2008 defense had been a disappointment, Obi Ezeh and Brandon Graham were considered to be a solid nucleus to build around. The team also employed a new defensive coordinator, Greg Robinson, to help guide this defensive turnaround. The key losses for the team were S Brandon Harrison, DE Tim Jamison, DT Will Johnson, RB Sam McGuffie, DT Terrance Taylor, LB John Thompson, QB Steven Threet, CB Morgan Trent.

== Recruiting ==
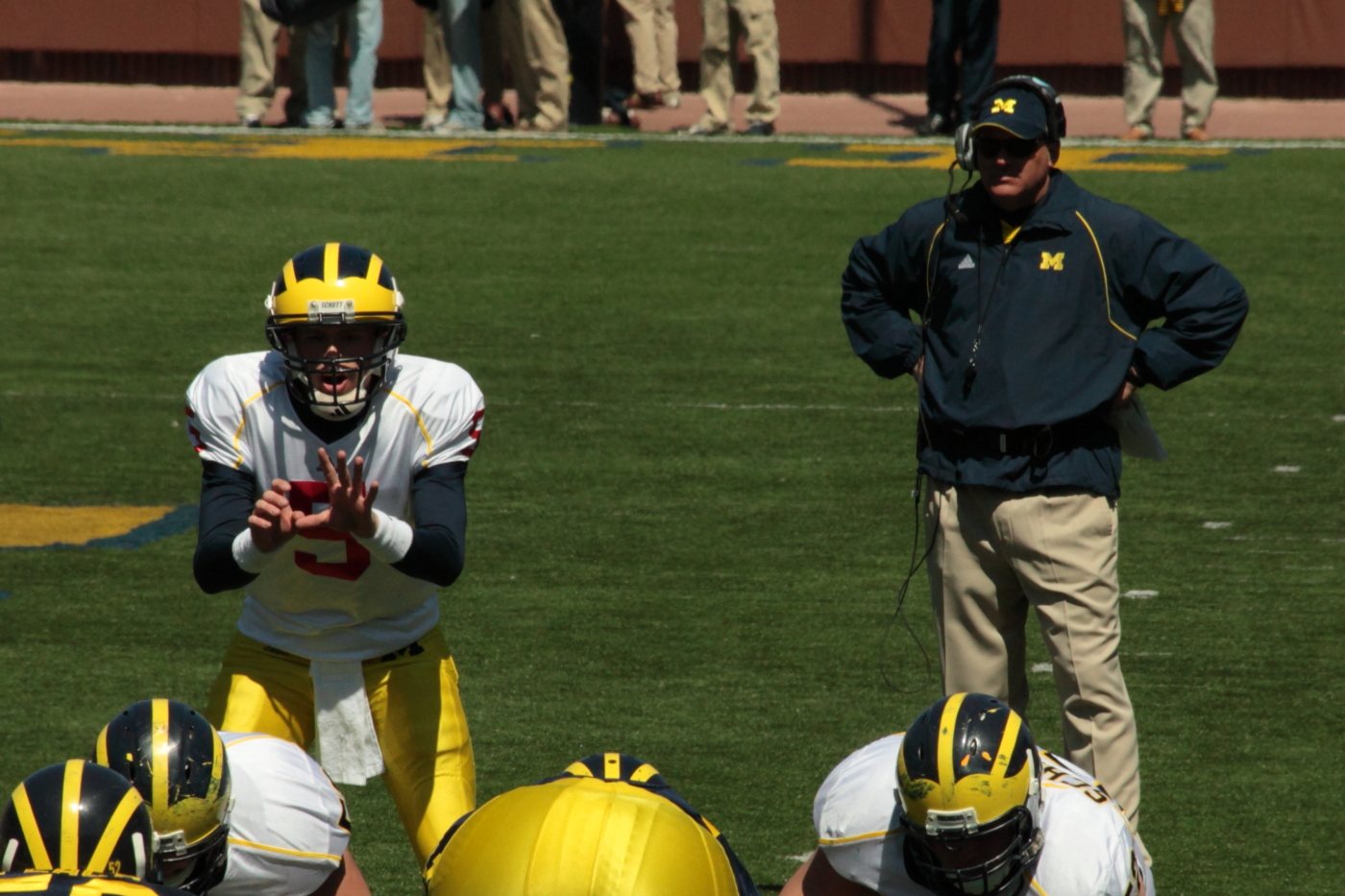
Rich Rodriguez & Tate Forcier during Spring practice on April 11, 2009

The Wolverines received several commitments from 4-star blue chip players. Among the recruits are Anthony LaLota of the Hun School in Princeton, New Jersey who is ranked as the fourth offensive tackle in the nation by Scout.com and sixth strong side defensive end by Rivals.com. LaLota appeared in the U.S. Army All-American game on January 3, 2009, in San Antonio, Texas. Other top recruits included a top-ten-rated dual-threat quarterback (Tate Forcier – Rivals #6) to run Rich Rodriguez's spread offense, and Justin Turner who was rated as the No. 3 safety.

Michigan's 2009 recruiting class was ranked 7th nationally by Rivals.com, and 10th by ESPN. Eight players initially committed to attend Michigan in 2009 but later decommitted and signed with a different college: Anthony Fera – K (PSU), Bryce McNeal – WR (Clemson), Kevin Newsome – QB (PSU), Dewayne Peace – WR (Arizona), Jordan Barnes – LB (Oklahoma State), Pearlie Graves – DT (Texas Tech), DeQuinta Jones – DT, and Shavodrick Beaver – QB (Tulsa)

Several recruits participated in the January 3 U.S. Army All-American game during which William Campbell announced his re-commitment to the program. Joining Campbell and LaLota in the All-America game were cornerback/safety Justin Turner, kicker Brendan Gibbons, and receivers Jeremy Gallon and Je'Ron Stokes. Several recruits began early enrollment at Michigan for the Spring 2009 semester, including quarterback Tate Forcier, five-star defensive tackle Will Campbell, running back Vincent Smith, defensive end Anthony LaLota, linebacker Brandin Hawthorne, defensive back Mike Jones and safety Vlad Emilien.

=== Recruits ===
College recruiting
| Name | Hometown | School | Height | Weight | 40^{‡} | Commit date |
|---|---|---|---|---|---|---|
| Isaiah Bell; LB | Youngstown, Ohio | Liberty (OH) | 6 ft 1 in (1.85 m) | 207 lb (94 kg) | – | Mar 31, 2008 |
| Isaiah Bell; LB | Recruit ratings: Scout: Rivals: (81) | | | | | |
| William Campbell; DT | Detroit, Michigan | Cass (MI) | 6 ft 5 in (1.96 m) | 323.5 lb (146.7 kg) | – | Jan 3, 2009 |
| William Campbell; DT | Recruit ratings: Scout: Rivals: (79) | | | | | |
| Vladimir Emilien; DB | Lauderhill, Florida | Plantation (FL) | 6 ft 1 in (1.85 m) | 188 lb (85 kg) | 4.66 | Nov 24, 2008 |
| Vladimir Emilien; DB | Recruit ratings: Scout: Rivals: (80) | | | | | |
| Tate Forcier; QB | San Diego, California | Charter School/Scripps Ranch (CA) | 6 ft 1 in (1.85 m) | 184 lb (83 kg) | 4.58 | Aug 31, 2008 |
| Tate Forcier; QB | Recruit ratings: Scout: Rivals: (81) | | | | | |
| Jeremy Gallon; WR/Athlete | Apopka, Florida | Apopka (FL) | 5 ft 8.5 in (1.74 m) | 170 lb (77 kg) | – | Jun 5, 2008 |
| Jeremy Gallon; WR/Athlete | Recruit ratings: Scout: Rivals: (77) | | | | | |
| Brendan Gibbons; K | West Palm Beach, Florida | Cardinal Newman (FL) | 6 ft 0 in (1.83 m) | 206 lb (93 kg) | – | Nov 13, 2008 |
| Brendan Gibbons; K | Recruit ratings: Scout: Rivals: (77) | | | | | |
| Cameron Gordon; WR | Inkster, Michigan | Inkster (MI) | 6 ft 2.5 in (1.89 m) | 210.5 lb (95.5 kg) | – | Dec 11, 2008 |
| Cameron Gordon; WR | Recruit ratings: Scout: Rivals: (78) | | | | | |
| Thomas Gordon; S/Athlete | Detroit, Michigan | Cass (MI) | 5 ft 11 in (1.80 m) | 202 lb (92 kg) | 4.6 | Sep 26, 2008 |
| Thomas Gordon; S/Athlete | Recruit ratings: Scout: Rivals: (77) | | | | | |
| Brandin Hawthorne; OLB | Pahokee, Florida | Pahokee (FL) | 6 ft 0.5 in (1.84 m) | 189 lb (86 kg) | 4.6 | Aug 29, 2008 |
| Brandin Hawthorne; OLB | Recruit ratings: Scout: Rivals: (78) | | | | | |
| Mike Jones; S | Orlando, Florida | Edgewater (FL) | 6 ft 3 in (1.91 m) | 200 lb (91 kg) | 4.5 | Aug 1, 2008 |
| Mike Jones; S | Recruit ratings: Scout: Rivals: (77) | | | | | |
| Teric Jones; RB | Detroit, Michigan | Cass (MI) | 5 ft 9.5 in (1.77 m) | 190 lb (86 kg) | 4.43 | Mar 29, 2008 |
| Teric Jones; RB | Recruit ratings: Scout: Rivals: (78) | | | | | |
| Anthony LaLota; DE | Princeton, New Jersey | Hun (NJ) | 6 ft 5.5 in (1.97 m) | 260 lb (120 kg) | 4.645 | Sep 12, 2008 |
| Anthony LaLota; DE | Recruit ratings: Scout: Rivals: (80) | | | | | |
| Taylor Lewan; OT | Scottsdale, Arizona | Chaparral (AZ) | 6 ft 6.5 in (1.99 m) | 270 lb (120 kg) | 4.645 | Dec 14, 2008 |
| Taylor Lewan; OT | Recruit ratings: Scout: Rivals: (80) | | | | | |
| Denard Robinson; CB/QB/Athlete | Deerfield Beach, Florida | Deerfield Beach (FL) | 6 ft 0 in (1.83 m) | 182 lb (83 kg) | 4.44 | Feb 4, 2009 |
| Denard Robinson; CB/QB/Athlete | Recruit ratings: Scout: Rivals: (81) | | | | | |
| Craig Roh; DE | Scottsdale, Arizona | Chaparral (AZ) | 6 ft 5 in (1.96 m) | 227.5 lb (103.2 kg) | 4.675 | Sep 19, 2008 |
| Craig Roh; DE | Recruit ratings: Scout: Rivals: (83) | | | | | |
| Michael Schofield; OT | Orland Park, Illinois | Carl Sandburg (IL) | 6 ft 6.5 in (1.99 m) | 271 lb (123 kg) | 4.675 | Jun 16, 2008 |
| Michael Schofield; OT | Recruit ratings: Scout: Rivals: (77) | | | | | |
| Vincent Smith; RB | Pahokee, Florida | Pahokee (FL) | 5 ft 7.5 in (1.71 m) | 162 lb (73 kg) | 4.62 | Aug 29, 2008 |
| Vincent Smith; RB | Recruit ratings: Scout: Rivals: (77) | | | | | |
| Je'Ron Stokes; WR | Philadelphia, Pennsylvania | Northeast (PA) | 6 ft 0.75 in (1.85 m) | 178 lb (81 kg) | 4.445 | Feb 4, 2009 |
| Je'Ron Stokes; WR | Recruit ratings: Scout: Rivals: (82) | | | | | |
| Fitzgerald Toussaint; RB | Youngstown, Ohio | Liberty (OH) | 5 ft 10 in (1.78 m) | 185 lb (84 kg) | 4.5 | Apr 18, 2008 |
| Fitzgerald Toussaint; RB | Recruit ratings: Scout: Rivals: (79) | | | | | |
| J. T. Turner; S/CB | Massillon, Ohio | Washington (OH) | 6 ft 2 in (1.88 m) | 185.5 lb (84.1 kg) | 4.49 | Mar 28, 2008 |
| J. T. Turner; S/CB | Recruit ratings: Scout: Rivals: (80) | | | | | |
| Quinton Washington; OG | St. Stephen, South Carolina | Timberland (SC) | 6 ft 3.5 in (1.92 m) | 318.5 lb (144.5 kg) | 5.6 | Feb 3, 2009 |
| Quinton Washington; OG | Recruit ratings: Scout: Rivals: (82) | | | | | |
| Adrian Witty; CB/S | Deerfield Beach, Florida | Deerfield Beach (FL) | 5 ft 11 in (1.80 m) | 180 lb (82 kg) | – | Feb 4, 2009 |
| Adrian Witty; CB/S | Recruit ratings: Scout: Rivals: (40) | | | | | |
Overall recruit ranking: Scout: 14 Rivals: 8 ESPN: 10
Note: In many cases, Scout, Rivals, 247Sports, On3, and ESPN may conflict in their listings of height and weight.; In these cases, the average was taken. ESPN grades are on a 100-point scale.; Sources: "Michigan Football Commitments". Rivals.; "2009 Michigan Football Commits". Scout.; "ESPN". ESPN.; "Scout.com Team Recruiting Rankings". Scout.; "2009 Team Ranking". Rivals.com.

== Practice time limit investigation ==
In an August 30, 2009 Detroit Free Press article, several current and former players on the 2008 and 2009 teams speaking anonymously said Michigan frequently violated the National Collegiate Athletic Association (NCAA) off-season 8-hour-per-week and in-season 20-hour-per-week practice limit. Rodriguez denied all of the allegations at a press conference the next day; The New York Times quoted him as saying "We know the rules, and we follow the rules." The University of Michigan Athletic Department's compliance office notified both the NCAA and the Big Ten Conference of its intentions to investigate itself. Unlike the University of Michigan basketball scandal where all of the participants had left the school by the time the investigation completed and punishment was handed down, many of the athletes involved in this scandal are still students at the University of Michigan; failure to cooperate with the investigation might result in the NCAA revoking the athletes eligibility to participate in athletic competitions. In November, the university revealed its finding that the team failed to file the proper paperwork to document the team's training schedule.

The NCAA had the right to either accept Michigan's findings once the athletic department's inquiry was completed or to conduct its own investigation. On October 23, 2009, the NCAA notified the school that it had decided to begin a formal investigation into the matter; they expected it to be completed by December 31, 2009. On February 22, 2010, the NCAA accused Michigan of failing to comply with practice time rules and "failed to promote an atmosphere of compliance within the football program" under coach Rich Rodriguez. The university had 90 days to respond and appeared at an NCAA hearing on infractions in August. Michigan issued self-sanctions on May 25, 2010, which included cutting practice time and placing itself on two years worth of probation. Michigan did, however, dispute the claim that Coach Rodriguez "failed to promote an atmosphere of compliance." The NCAA handed down their final verdict in the case on November 4, 2010, which accepted almost all of the self-sanctions that Michigan provided. Michigan was docked 130 practice hours, which was twice the number of excess hours that the university had exceeded, and placed on three years probation, which was one more than originally proposed; but the university and Rodriguez did, however, escape the most serious charge of "failing to promote an atmosphere of compliance", as the NCAA agreed with Michigan's statement that the cases were not deliberate and isolated. This ruling ended the NCAA's investigation of Michigan's football program.

== Preseason award watch lists ==
| Award | Player |
|---|---|
| Chuck Bednarik Award (Top Defensive Player) | Brandon Graham |
| Butkus Award (Best Linebacker) | Obi Ezeh |
| Ray Guy Award (Outstanding Punter) | Zoltan Mesko |
| Ted Hendricks Award (Outstanding Defensive End) | Brandon Graham |
| Lombardi Award (Outstanding Lineman) | Brandon Graham |
| Lombardi Award (Outstanding Lineman) | David Molk |
| Lombardi Award (Outstanding Lineman) | Stephen Schilling |
| Lott Trophy (defensive impact player of the year) | Brandon Graham |
| Maxwell Award (Top College Player) | Brandon Minor |
| Bronko Nagurski Trophy (Top Defensive Player) | Brandon Graham |
| Dave Rimington Trophy (Outstanding Center) | David Molk |
| Doak Walker Award (Outstanding Running Back) | Brandon Minor |

Several players excelled individually. The season began with numerous Wolverines on national award preseason watchlists. Brandon Graham led the way with five such recognitions for the Bednarik Award, Hendricks Award, Lombardi Award, Lott Trophy and Bronko Nagurski Trophy. David Molk was on both the Lombardi and Rimington Trophy preseason lists, while Brandon Minor was on both the Maxwell Award and Doak Walker Award lists. Obi Ezeh, Zoltan Mesko, and Stephen Schilling were preseason Butkus Award, Ray Guy Award and Lombardi candidates, respectively. As the season started, Michigan burst out with a 4–0 start and saw several players recognized as Big Ten Conference player of the week early in the season: Tate Forcier, Carlos Brown and Mesko. Also, several players earned midseason or finalist watchlist recognitions: Ezeh (Butkus), Mesko (Guy) and Graham (Hendrick).

During week 2, Tate Forcier (Offense) and Darryl Stonum (special teams) were honored by the Big Ten Conference as players of the week (POW). At the same time, Forcier was also named AT&T All-America Player of the Week, as well as the Davey O'Brien National Quarterback of the Week Award and Rivals.com National Freshmen of the Week and the Rivals.com Big Ten Offensive Player of the Week honor. The following week, Carlos Brown earned co-offensive POW honors along with Northwestern's Mike Kafka. Zoltan Mesko was named the special teams player of the week on October 11. The only statistical leader for the team was Mesko who in eight conference games averaged 45.2 yards/punt, which was the first time a Michigan punter led the Big Ten in Conference game punting average since Paul Staroba in 1970. Brandon Graham and Mesko were first-team All-Big Ten selections by both the coaches and the media. Donovan Warren was first-team by the media and second-team by the coaches and Stephen Schilling was an honorable mention on both lists.

Ezeh was one of sixteen players and three from the Big Ten for the Butkus midseason watch list. Mesko was named one of 10 semifinalists for the Ray Guy Award and one of 12 finalists for the Wuerffel Trophy. Graham was one of seven finalists for the Hendricks Award.

== Rankings ==
Ranking movements Legend: ██ Increase in ranking ██ Decrease in ranking — = Not ranked RV = Received votes
| | Week | | | | | | | | | | | | | | | |
| Poll | Pre | 1 | 2 | 3 | 4 | 5 | 6 | 7 | 8 | 9 | 10 | 11 | 12 | 13 | 14 | Final |
|---|---|---|---|---|---|---|---|---|---|---|---|---|---|---|---|---|
| AP | — | RV | 25 | 23 | 22 | RV | RV | RV | — | — | — | — | — | — | — | — |
| Coaches | RV | RV | RV | 22 | 20 | RV | RV | RV | — | — | — | — | — | — | — | — |
| Harris | Not released | | | | 20 | RV | RV | RV | — | — | — | — | — | — | — | Not released |
| BCS | Not released | | | | | | | — | — | — | — | — | — | — | — | Not released |

*Source: ESPN.com: 2009 NCAA Football Rankings

== Schedule ==
| Date | Time | Opponent | Rank | Site | TV | Result | Attendance |
|---|---|---|---|---|---|---|---|
| September 5 | 3:30 p.m. | Western Michigan* | | Michigan Stadium; Ann Arbor, MI | ABC, ESPN2 | W 31–7 | 109,019 |
| September 12 | 3:30 p.m. | No. 18 Notre Dame* | | Michigan Stadium; Ann Arbor, MI (rivalry) | ABC | W 38–34 | 110,278 |
| September 19 | 12:00 p.m. | Eastern Michigan* | No. 25 | Michigan Stadium; Ann Arbor, MI | BTN | W 45–17 | 107,903 |
| September 26 | 12:00 p.m. | Indiana^{†} | No. 23 | Michigan Stadium; Ann Arbor, MI | ESPN2 | W 36–33 | 108,118 |
| October 3 | 12:00 p.m. | at Michigan State | No. 20 | Spartan Stadium; East Lansing, MI (rivalry) | BTN | L 20–26 ^{OT} | 78,629 |
| October 10 | 8:00 p.m. | at No. 12 Iowa | | Kinnick Stadium; Iowa City, IA | ABC | L 28–30 | 70,585 |
| October 17 | 12:00 p.m. | Delaware State* | | Michigan Stadium; Ann Arbor, MI | BTN | W 63–6 | 106,304 |
| October 24 | 3:30 p.m. | No. 13 Penn State | | Michigan Stadium; Ann Arbor, MI (rivalry) | ABC, ESPN | L 10–35 | 110,377 |
| October 31 | 3:30 p.m. | at Illinois | | Memorial Stadium; Champaign, IL (rivalry) | ABC, ESPN2 | L 13–38 | 60,119 |
| November 7 | 12:00 p.m. | Purdue | | Michigan Stadium; Ann Arbor, MI | BTN | L 36–38 | 108,543 |
| November 14 | 12:00 p.m. | at No. 21 Wisconsin | | Camp Randall Stadium; Madison, WI | BTN | L 24–45 | 80,540 |
| November 21 | 12:00 p.m. | No. 9 Ohio State | | Michigan Stadium; Ann Arbor, MI (The Game) | ABC | L 10–21 | 110,922 |
*Non-conference game; ^{†}Homecoming; Rankings from AP Poll released prior to the game; All times are in Eastern time

== Radio ==
Radio coverage for all games was on The Michigan Wolverines Football Network, and on Sirius XM Satellite Radio, as well as online at The Michigan Sports Network Online Stream. The radio announcers were (WJR talk show host) Frank Beckmann with play-by-play, Jim Brandstatter with color commentary, and Doug Karsch with sideline reports.

== Game summaries ==
=== Western Michigan ===
Western Michigan at Michigan

| Team | 1 | 2 | 3 | 4 | Total |
|---|---|---|---|---|---|
| Broncos | 0 | 0 | 0 | 7 | 7 |
| • Wolverines | 14 | 17 | 0 | 0 | 31 |

- Date: September 5
- Location: Michigan Stadium
  Ann Arbor, Michigan
- Game start: 3:30 pm
- Elapsed time: 3:15
- Game attendance: 109,019
- Referee: R. Tobert
- TV announcers (ABC/ESPN2): Mike Patrick (Play-by-play), Craig James (Color) & Quint Kessenich (Sideline)

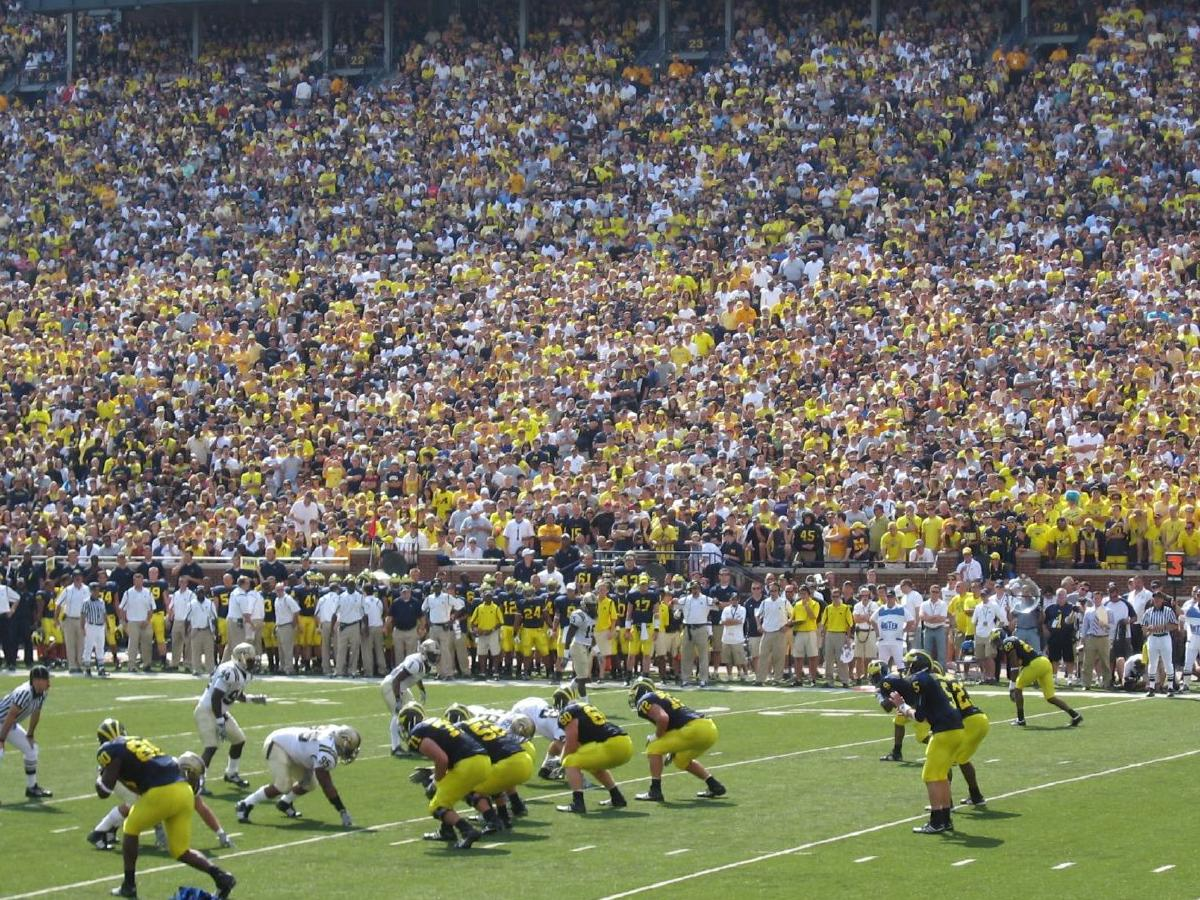
Michigan offense led by Tate Forcier against the 2009 Western Michigan Broncos football team.

In the season opener, the Wolverines played the Western Michigan Broncos at Michigan Stadium. The Wolverines scored first, midway through the first quarter, with a 27-yard touchdown (TD) pass from Tate Forcier to Junior Hemingway. They added to their lead five minutes later when Denard Robinson ran in a TD from 43 yards out. In the second quarter, Michigan added 17 more points: two TDs and a field goal. First was a 7-yard TD pass from Tate Forcier to Kevin Koger. 6 minutes later, Jason Olesnavage kicked a 44-yard field goal. Junior Hemingway scored Michigan's final points when he caught a 44-yard TD pass from Tate Forcier, putting the Wolverines up 31–0 at halftime. Western Michigan missed a field goal just before the end of the half.

The second half was largely uneventful. Michigan was content to hold their lead; they essentially stopped passing in the fourth quarter, with Forcier being replaced by backup David Cone midway through the period. Western Michigan finally got on the board with a fourth-quarter 73-yard TD pass from Tim Hiller to Juan Nunez.

The win stopped a streak of two consecutive season opening losses. The 2007 Michigan Wolverines football team, then ranked No. 5 in the nation, lost their season opener in shocking fashion to two-time defending Division I-FCS champion Appalachian State. The 2008 Michigan Wolverines football team lost their opener to Utah, who would go on to finish as the only undefeated team in Division I-FBS, winning the Mountain West Conference and the 2009 Sugar Bowl over Alabama.

| Statistics | WMU | MICH |
|---|---|---|
| First downs | 15 | 24 |
| Total yards | 301 | 439 |
| Rushing yards | 38 | 242 |
| Passing yards | 275 | 197 |
| Turnovers | 3 | 1 |
| Time of possession | 25:40 | 34:20 |

| Team | Category | Player | Statistics |
|---|---|---|---|
| Western Michigan | Passing | Tim Hiller | 22/38, 259 yards, TD, 2 INT |
| Western Michigan | Rushing | Brandon West | 13 rushes, 41 yards |
| Western Michigan | Receiving | Juan Nunez | 7 receptions, 151 yards, TD |
| Michigan | Passing | Tate Forcier | 13/20, 179 yards, 3 TD |
| Michigan | Rushing | Denard Robinson | 11 rushes, 74 yards, TD |
| Michigan | Receiving | Junior Hemingway | 5 receptions, 103 yards, 2 TD |

=== No. 18 Notre Dame ===
No. 18 Notre Dame at Michigan

| Team | 1 | 2 | 3 | 4 | Total |
|---|---|---|---|---|---|
| No. 18 Fighting Irish | 3 | 17 | 0 | 14 | 34 |
| • Wolverines | 14 | 3 | 7 | 14 | 38 |

- Date: September 12
- Location: Michigan Stadium
  Ann Arbor, Michigan
- Game start: 3:30 pm
- Elapsed time: 3:45
- Game attendance: 110,278
- Referee: Bill LeMonnier
- TV announcers (ABC): Sean McDonough (Play-by-play), Matt Millen (Color) & Holly Rowe (Sideline)

In week 2, Michigan renewed their long-time rivalry with the visiting Notre Dame Fighting Irish. On the opening drive, Notre Dame drove the field for an unsuccessful field goal attempt. Michigan scored first late in the first quarter when Brandon Minor ran in a 2-yard TD. Notre Dame responded with a field goal by Nick Taush. Less than twenty seconds later, however, Michigan answered another touchdown on a 94-yard kickoff return by Darryl Stonum. Notre Dame came back to take the lead in the second quarter with back-to-back touchdown passes, 4 yards to Golden Tate and 11 yards to Michael Floyd. After another three-and-out by Michigan, the Irish made their way down the field but were stopped by the Wolverine defense, forcing them to kick a 42-yard field goal. Michigan got the ball back with less than 4 minutes in the half and marched down the field, but with little time left on the clock they had to settle to end the first half with a 39-yard field goal.

Michigan dominated the third quarter, constantly stopping the Irish and controlling the ball most of the period. The Wolverines scored the only points of the quarter on a 3-yard TD pass to Kevin Koger. Early in the fourth quarter, after another three-and-out by Notre Dame, Forcier ran in a TD himself from 31 yards out on 4th and 3. Notre Dame came back later in the quarter, starting with a 21-yard touchdown pass to Tate. Following the touchdown the Irish attempted and failed to score a two-point conversion, leaving themselves down five. After Michigan had an unsuccessful drive, Notre Dame took the lead with a 2-yard TD run by Armando Allen, who then scored on their second 2-point conversion attempt, putting the Irish ahead with less than 5 minutes remaining. Michigan responded by marching the length of the field, consuming most of the remaining time. They eventually found themselves 5 yards away from the goal line with 22 seconds left. Two plays later the Wolverines would score the game-winning touchdown on a 5-yard pass from Forcier to Greg Mathews.

The victory gave the Wolverines their first 2–0 start since 2006. Michigan's all-time record versus Notre Dame improved to 21–15–1 as a result of the victory. This was the highest scoring game in the history of the rivalry, with a total of 72 points between the teams.

| Statistics | ND | MICH |
|---|---|---|
| First downs | 27 | 21 |
| Total yards | 490 | 430 |
| Rushing yards | 154 | 190 |
| Passing yards | 336 | 249 |
| Turnovers | 1 | 1 |
| Time of possession | 31:25 | 28:35 |

| Team | Category | Player | Statistics |
|---|---|---|---|
| Notre Dame | Passing | Jimmy Clausen | 25/42, 336 yards, 3 TD |
| Notre Dame | Rushing | Armando Allen | 21 rushes, 139 yards, TD |
| Notre Dame | Receiving | Michael Floyd | 7 receptions, 131 yards, TD |
| Michigan | Passing | Tate Forcier | 23/33, 240 yards, 2 TD, INT |
| Michigan | Rushing | Brandon Minor | 16 rushes, 106 yards, TD |
| Michigan | Receiving | Greg Matthews | 5 receptions, 68 yards, TD |

=== Eastern Michigan ===
Eastern Michigan at No. 25 Michigan

| Team | 1 | 2 | 3 | 4 | Total |
|---|---|---|---|---|---|
| Eagles | 3 | 14 | 0 | 0 | 17 |
| • No. 25 Wolverines | 10 | 14 | 14 | 7 | 45 |

- Date: September 19
- Location: Michigan Stadium
  Ann Arbor, Michigan
- Game start: 12:00 pm
- Elapsed time: 3:05
- Game attendance: 107,903
- Referee: M. Cannon
- TV announcers (BTN): Wayne Larrivee (Play-by-play), Chris Martin (Color) & Charissa Thompson (Sideline)

In week 3, the Wolverines hosted the Eastern Michigan Eagles from nearby Ypsilanti. Michigan opened the scoring in the first quarter with a 37-yard field goal by Jason Olesnavage. The Eagles tied the score with 43-yard field goal by Joe Carithers. Michigan regained the lead when Carlos Brown ran in a 9-yard TD near the end of the quarter. Eastern Michigan re-tied the score in the second quarter with an 11-yard TD run by Andy Schmitt. Michigan responded with 2 TDs: first a 5-yard TD run by Michael Shaw, then a 90-yard TD run by Carlos Brown, the third longest TD run from scrimmage in Michigan football history. The Eagles scored their final points of the game just before halftime with a 5-yard TD run by Dwayne Priest. Michigan dominated the second half, beginning with a 13-yard TD run by Martavious Odoms. A little over a minute later QB Denard Robinson ran in a 13-yard TD. In the 4th quarter Odoms ran in another TD from 36 yards out.

With the win Michigan started 3–0 for the first time since 2006. The win also made Michigan's all-time record against Eastern Michigan 9–0; and 26–1 all time against MAC schools. Eastern Michigan would finish the 2009 season with a winless record.

| Statistics | EMU | MICH |
|---|---|---|
| First downs | 17 | 17 |
| Total yards | 285 | 448 |
| Rushing yards | 179 | 380 |
| Passing yards | 112 | 87 |
| Turnovers | 2 | 2 |
| Time of possession | 40:02 | 19:58 |

| Team | Category | Player | Statistics |
|---|---|---|---|
| Eastern Michigan | Passing | Andy Schmitt | 13/22, 97 yards, INT |
| Eastern Michigan | Rushing | Dwayne Priest | 27 rushes, 91 yards, TD |
| Eastern Michigan | Receiving | Marvon Sanders | 4 receptions, 32 yards |
| Michigan | Passing | Tate Forcier | 7/13, 68 yards |
| Michigan | Rushing | Carlos Brown | 13 rushes, 187 yards, 2 TD |
| Michigan | Receiving | Martavius Odoms | 2 receptions, 33 yards |

=== Indiana ===
Indiana at No. 22 Michigan

| Team | 1 | 2 | 3 | 4 | Total |
|---|---|---|---|---|---|
| Hoosiers | 14 | 9 | 3 | 7 | 33 |
| • No. 22 Wolverines | 14 | 7 | 0 | 15 | 36 |

- Date: September 26
- Location: Michigan Stadium
  Ann Arbor, Michigan
- Game start: 12:00 pm
- Elapsed time: 3:24
- Game attendance: 108,118
- Referee: D. Lipski
- TV announcers (ESPN2): Pam Ward (Play-by-play) & Ray Bentley (Color)

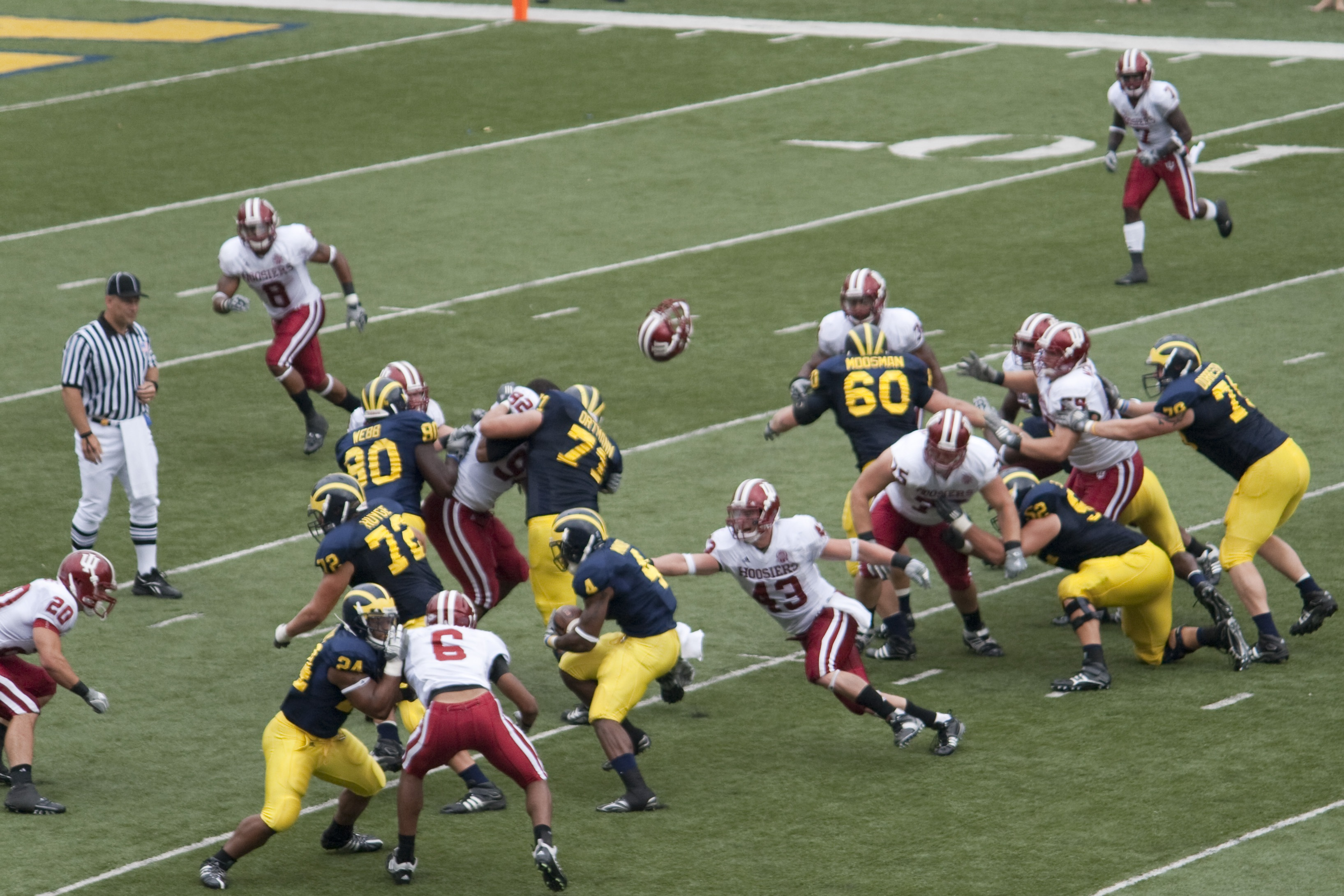
Brandon Minor runs with blocking from Kevin Grady (24), Mark Huyge (72), Martell Webb (80), Mark Ortmann (71), David Moosman (60), Steven Schilling (52), and Perry Dorrestein (79)

On their homecoming weekend, the Wolverines hosted the Indiana Hoosiers. Indiana opened the scoring with a 25-yard TD run by Tandon Doss. Michigan responded with 2 TDs by Carlos Brown, first a 61-yard TD catch, then a 41-yard TD run. Indiana tied it back up with an 11-yard TD rush by Darius Willis. In the second quarter, Indiana kicked field goals on consecutive possessions, from 24 and 20 yards. Michigan responded with a 12-yard TD run by Brandon Minor. Indiana retook the lead with its 3rd field goal of the quarter, this one from 30 yards, making the halftime score 23–21 Indiana.

The only points of the third quarter came from a 32-yard Indiana field goal. Michigan regained the lead in the fourth with a 7-yard rush by Forcier who leaped over a defender into the endzone. He also completed a quarterback sneak for a 2-point conversion the next play, giving Michigan a 29–26 lead. Indiana took the lead back on the next offensive play with an 85-yard run for a TD by Darius Willis. Michigan regained the final lead with a 26-yard Martavius Odoms TD catch, and sealed their win soon after with a controversial interception by Donovan Warren.

This was the 16th consecutive time Michigan has beaten Indiana, and the 24th consecutive conference opening win for the Wolverines at home. Michigan started the season 4–0 for the first time since 2006.

| Statistics | IU | MICH |
|---|---|---|
| First downs | 20 | 20 |
| Total yards | 467 | 372 |
| Rushing yards | 197 | 149 |
| Passing yards | 282 | 230 |
| Turnovers | 1 | 2 |
| Time of possession | 30:52 | 29:08 |

| Team | Category | Player | Statistics |
|---|---|---|---|
| Indiana | Passing | Ben Chappell | 21/38, 270 yards, INT |
| Indiana | Rushing | Darius Willis | 16 rushes, 152 yards, 2 TD |
| Indiana | Receiving | Tandon Doss | 5 receptions, 104 yards |
| Michigan | Passing | Tate Forcier | 11/21, 184 yards, 2 TD, INT |
| Michigan | Rushing | Carlos Brown | 11 rushes, 83 yards, TD |
| Michigan | Receiving | Carlos Brown | 1 reception, 61 yards, TD |

=== At Michigan State ===
No. 20 Michigan at Michigan State

| Team | 1 | 2 | 3 | 4 | OT | Total |
|---|---|---|---|---|---|---|
| No. 20 Wolverines | 3 | 3 | 0 | 14 | 0 | 20 |
| • Spartans | 7 | 3 | 3 | 7 | 6 | 26 |

- Date: October 3
- Location: Spartan Stadium
  East Lansing, Michigan
- Game start: 12:00 pm
- Elapsed time: 3:15
- Game attendance: 78,629
- Game weather: 52 °F (11 °C), Overcast
- Referee: Ron Torbert
- TV announcers (BTN): Wayne Larrivee (Play-by-play), Chris Martin (Color) & Charissa Thompson (Sideline)

In week 5, Michigan took their first road trip of the season to East Lansing, Michigan to play their in-state rivals the Michigan State Spartans for the Paul Bunyan Trophy. After an interception, Michigan scored first with a 36-yard field goal early in the first quarter. The Spartans countered with a 1-yard TD run by Larry Caper. Each team had a field goal in the 2nd quarter: Michigan had a 42-yarder, then State had a 26 yarder, putting the Spartans up 13–6 at halftime.

Michigan State added to their lead at the start of the 2nd half with a 15-yard TD run by Glenn Winston. Michigan responded in the 4th quarter with a 60-yard touchdown by Darryl Stonum, and tied it up just before time expired with a 92-yard drive capped by a 9-yard TD pass by Forcier to Roy Roundtree, taking the game to overtime. On its opening drive of overtime Forcier led Michigan down to the 8-yard line but then threw a tipped interception in the end zone, ending their threat. MSU's Larry Caper ended the game with a 23-yard TD run on 3rd down and 12, breaking three Michigan tackles that would have forced the Spartans to kick a field goal for the win.

The Spartans outgained the Wolverines 417 to 251 in total yards and won the rushing battle 197 to 28. It is the 37th time in the last 40 meetings that the team who has won the rushing battle won the game. Michigan State won by six points: the last six meetings between the two teams in East Lansing have been decided by seven points or less, or a difference of 25 points in all six games combined.

| Statistics | MICH | MSU |
|---|---|---|
| First downs | 14 | 20 |
| Total yards | 251 | 417 |
| Rushing yards | 28 | 197 |
| Passing yards | 261 | 229 |
| Turnovers | 2 | 3 |
| Time of possession | 39:46 | 20:14 |

| Team | Category | Player | Statistics |
|---|---|---|---|
| Michigan | Passing | Tate Forcier | 17/32, 223 yards, 2 TD, INT |
| Michigan | Rushing | Tate Forcier | 13 rushes, 27 yards |
| Michigan | Receiving | Darryl Stonum | 5 receptions, 97 yards, TD |
| Michigan State | Passing | Kirk Cousins | 15/21, 152 yards, 2 INT |
| Michigan State | Rushing | Kirk Cousins | 7 rushes, 75 yards |
| Michigan State | Receiving | B. J. Cunningham | 5 receptions, 73 yards |

=== At No. 12 Iowa ===
Michigan at No. 12 Iowa

| Team | 1 | 2 | 3 | 4 | Total |
|---|---|---|---|---|---|
| Wolverines | 14 | 0 | 7 | 7 | 28 |
| • No. 12 Hawkeyes | 10 | 10 | 3 | 7 | 30 |

- Date: October 10
- Location: Kinnick Stadium
  Iowa City, Iowa
- Game start: 8:00 pm
- Elapsed time: 3:17
- Game attendance: 70,585
- Game weather: 33 °F (1 °C), Partly Cloudy, WNW 9 MPH
- Referee: Todd Geerling
- TV announcers (ABC): Brent Musburger (Play-by-play), Kirk Herbstreit (Color) & Lisa Salters (Sideline)

Week 6 brought the Wolverines to Iowa City, Iowa for a primetime duel against the Iowa Hawkeyes. Michigan went up early in the 1st with an interception that was returned 40 yards by Donovan Warren for a touchdown. Iowa responded a few minutes later with a 34-yard TD pass to Tony Moeaki from Ricky Stanzi and took the lead with a 28-yard Daniel Murray field goal soon after. Michigan responded late in the quarter when Brandon Minor ran for a touchdown from 3 yards. Iowa added 10 more points in the 2nd quarter: first a 41-yard field goal, then a 1-yard TD run by Brandon Wegher, making the halftime score 20–14 Iowa.

The Hawkeyes opened the third quarter by booting a 40-yard field goal. Michigan responded with a 1-yard TD run late in the 3rd by Minor. Stanzi and Moeaki connected again for a 42-yard Iowa TD in the 4th. Michigan scored on a 3-yard TD run by QB Denard Robinson with about 4 minutes left and held Iowa to a 3-play drive, getting the ball back just down by 2 points (28–30). In the final minute of the game, Michigan drove down the field about 30 yards on an attempted drive to kick a game-winning field goal or TD, but Robinson threw a deep interception, sealing the Hawkeyes' victory.

Michigan turned the ball over five times and fell to 1–5 in Big Ten road games under Rich Rodriguez. Michigan QB Tate Forcier left the game with 7 minutes remaining in the fourth quarter; it was later discovered that he sustained a concussion during the game. Backup quarterback Denard Robinson served as an able replacement, leading the Wolverines on the TD drive to bring them to within 2 until he threw the game-losing interception on the final drive.

| Statistics | MICH | IOWA |
|---|---|---|
| First downs | 18 | 17 |
| Total yards | 319 | 367 |
| Rushing yards | 195 | 83 |
| Passing yards | 134 | 299 |
| Turnovers | 5 | 1 |
| Time of possession | 32:15 | 27:45 |

| Team | Category | Player | Statistics |
|---|---|---|---|
| Michigan | Passing | Tate Forcier | 8/19, 94 yards, INT |
| Michigan | Rushing | Brandon Minor | 2 rushes, 95 yards, 2 TD |
| Michigan | Receiving | Martavious Odoms | 4 receptions, 76 yards |
| Iowa | Passing | Ricky Stanzi | 20/38, 284 yards, 2 TD, INT |
| Iowa | Rushing | Adam Robinson | 10 rushes, 70 yards |
| Iowa | Receiving | Tony Moeaki | 6 receptions, 105 yards, 2 TD |

=== Delaware State ===
Delaware State at Michigan

| Team | 1 | 2 | 3 | 4 | Total |
|---|---|---|---|---|---|
| Hornets | 0 | 3 | 0 | 3 | 6 |
| • Wolverines | 28 | 21 | 0 | 14 | 63 |

- Date: October 17
- Location: Michigan Stadium
  Ann Arbor, Michigan
- Game start: 12:00 pm
- Elapsed time: 3:10
- Game attendance: 106,304
- Referee: D. Capron
- TV announcers (BTN): Matt Devlin (Play-by-play), Mark Campbell (Color) & Brent Stover (Sideline)

In week 7, Michigan hosted the Delaware State Hornets from Division-I FCS, in the first ever meeting between the two teams. Michigan dominated throughout the game. They scored 7 unanswered touchdowns in the first half, four in the first quarter alone: a Michael Shaw 2-yard run, a 6-yard run by Vincent Smith, a blocked punt that was picked up by Brandon Graham for a score, and a 38-yard catch by Kelvin Grady. In the second quarter, the Wolverines added three more touchdowns, on a 4-yard run by QB Denard Robinson, a 28-yard catch by Martell Webb, and a 7-yard run by Kevin Grady. Delaware State finally got on the board just before halftime with a 26-yard field goal by Riley Flickinger.

The second half was more sedate. Neither team scored in the third quarter. In the fourth Delaware State kicked a second field goal, this time from 24 yards. Michigan's Michael Cox responded with two more touchdowns, from 57 and later 3 yards.

Several Michigan school records were broken or tied in the blowout win. The Wolverines' 727 yards of total offense set a new team record; the 442 total offensive yards in the first half alone also set a team record. Their 57-point win tied the second-biggest margin of victory for them since 1950, and tied for the eighth-largest margin of victory in school history. The 49 first half points was the team's second highest ever. The 28 point first quarter also tied a school record. Because of the effectiveness of the offense, the team did not punt the ball once, the first time this has happened since 1978.

| Statistics | DSU | MICH |
|---|---|---|
| First downs | 11 | 34 |
| Total yards | 216 | 727 |
| Rushing yards | 65 | 461 |
| Passing yards | 160 | 266 |
| Turnovers | 0 | 1 |
| Time of possession | 30:10 | 29:50 |

| Team | Category | Player | Statistics |
|---|---|---|---|
| Delaware State | Passing | Nick Elko | 18/34, 151 yards |
| Delaware State | Rushing | Nick Williams | 10 rushes, 48 yards |
| Delaware State | Receiving | Justin Wilson | 4 receptions, 55 yards |
| Michigan | Passing | Nick Sheridan | 7/9, 88 yards |
| Michigan | Rushing | Vincent Smith | 17 rushes, 166 yards, TD |
| Michigan | Receiving | Kelvin Grady | 2 receptions, 48 yards, TD |

=== No. 11 Penn State ===
No. 11 Penn State State at Michigan

| Team | 1 | 2 | 3 | 4 | Total |
|---|---|---|---|---|---|
| • No. 11 Nittany Lions | 10 | 9 | 13 | 3 | 35 |
| Wolverines | 7 | 3 | 0 | 0 | 10 |

- Date: October 24
- Location: Michigan Stadium
  Ann Arbor, Michigan
- Game start: 3:30 pm
- Elapsed time: 3:13
- Game attendance: 110,377
- Referee: John O'Neill
- TV announcers (ABC/ESPN): Sean McDonough (Play-by-play), Matt Millen (Color) & Holly Rowe (Sideline)

In week 8, Michigan hosted the Penn State Nittany Lions at rain soaked Michigan Stadium. Michigan got an early lead after the first drive of the game when Brandon Minor ran in a TD from one yard out. Penn State tied the score with a 10-yard TD catch by Graham Zug from Daryll Clark, and took the lead for good on a 34-yard field goal by Collin Wagner. In the second quarter Michigan surrendered a safety after a bad snap in the end zone. On the ensuing possession, the Nittany Lions scored on a 60-yard TD pass to Andrew Quarless. Michigan responded with a 23-yard field goal, making the halftime score 19–10.

Penn State dominated the second half, shutting out the Wolverines. The Nittany Lions added 13 points to their lead off of two Graham Zug TD catches in the third quarter, from 11 and 17-yard respectively. Penn State capped off their victory with a 29-yard field goal in the 4th.

Michigan suffered their first home loss of the season. This was the first time the Wolverines had lost to Penn State at home since 1996, ending a five-game losing streak for the Nittany Lions in Ann Arbor. Penn State defeated Michigan for the second straight season, its first win streak versus the Wolverines since a three-game streak from 1994 to 1996.

| Statistics | PSU | MICH |
|---|---|---|
| First downs | 18 | 17 |
| Total yards | 396 | 250 |
| Rushing yards | 166 | 110 |
| Passing yards | 242 | 166 |
| Turnovers | 0 | 4 |
| Time of possession | 34:48 | 25:12 |

| Team | Category | Player | Statistics |
|---|---|---|---|
| Penn State | Passing | Daryll Clark | 16/27, 230 yards, 4 TD |
| Penn State | Rushing | Evan Royster | 20 rushes, 100 yards |
| Penn State | Receiving | Andrew Quarless | 2 receptions, 91 yards, TD |
| Michigan | Passing | Tate Forcier | 13/30, 140 yards, INT |
| Michigan | Rushing | Brandon Minor | 12 rushes, 48 yards, TD |
| Michigan | Receiving | Greg Matthews | 7 receptions, 70 yards |

=== At Illinois ===
Michigan at Illinois

| Team | 1 | 2 | 3 | 4 | Total |
|---|---|---|---|---|---|
| Wolverines | 7 | 6 | 0 | 0 | 13 |
| • Fighting Illini | 7 | 0 | 21 | 10 | 38 |

- Date: October 31
- Location: Memorial Stadium
  Champaign, Illinois
- Game start: 3:30 pm
- Elapsed time: 3:03
- Game attendance: 60,119
- Game weather: 46 °F (8 °C), Clear, N 15 MPH
- Referee: Dave Witvoet
- TV announcers (ABC/ESPN2): Mike Patrick (Play-by-play) & Craig James (Color)

In week 9, the Wolverines traveled to Champaign, Illinois for a Halloween afternoon contest with the Illinois Fighting Illini. Illinois scored first midway through the first quarter with a 3-yard TD run by Arrelious Benn. Michigan tied it up with a 2-yard TD run by Carlos Brown. The Wolverines kicked two field goals in the second quarter, from 29 and 42 yards out respectively, making the score at halftime 13–7 in their favor.

For the second straight game, Michigan was held scoreless in the second half. Illinois held the Wolverines on a goal line stand; on the following possession, Illini RB Mikel LeShoure ran in a 70-yard TD. A few minutes later, London Davis caught a 2-yard TD pass. QB Isiah Williams ran in a TD himself from 3 yards out for Illinois' third score of the quarter. In the fourth quarter, Illinois kicked a 23-yard field goal and capped off their scoring with a 79-yard TD run by Jason Ford. It was Michigan's first loss at Illinois since 1983.

| Statistics | MICH | ILL |
|---|---|---|
| First downs | 17 | 20 |
| Total yards | 377 | 500 |
| Rushing yards | 113 | 377 |
| Passing yards | 286 | 158 |
| Turnovers | 3 | 0 |
| Time of possession | 35:06 | 24:54 |

| Team | Category | Player | Statistics |
|---|---|---|---|
| Michigan | Passing | Tate Forcier | 13/23, 257 yards |
| Michigan | Rushing | Carlos Brown | 25 rushes, 94 yards, TD |
| Michigan | Receiving | Roy Roundtree | 4 receptions, 92 yards |
| Illinois | Passing | Juice Williams | 8/11, 123 yards, TD |
| Illinois | Rushing | Mikel LeShoure | 21 rushes, 150 yards, TD |
| Illinois | Receiving | Jeff Cumberland | 2 receptions, 51 yards |

=== Purdue ===
Purdue at Michigan

| Team | 1 | 2 | 3 | 4 | Total |
|---|---|---|---|---|---|
| • Boilermakers | 10 | 0 | 21 | 7 | 38 |
| Wolverines | 10 | 14 | 6 | 6 | 36 |

- Date: November 7
- Location: Michigan Stadium
  Ann Arbor, Michigan
- Game start: 12:00 pm
- Elapsed time: 3:15
- Game attendance: 108,543
- Referee: T. Geerlings
- TV announcers (BTN): Wayne Larrivee (Play-by-play), Chris Martin (Color) & Charissa Thompson (Sideline)

In week 10, Michigan hosted the Purdue Boilermakers. In the first quarter, Purdue scored first with a 35-yard TD catch by Ralph Bolden. Michigan tied the score with a 29-yard TD run by Brandon Minor. Purdue retook the lead with a 41-yard field goal by Carson Wiggs. Michigan tied the score soon after with a 51-yard field goal. In the second quarter, Michigan scored 2 touchdowns: a 55-yard rush by Brandon Minor, and a 43-yard catch by Ray Roundtree, giving the Wolverines a 14-point advantage at halftime.

Once again, Michigan collapsed in the second half. In the third quarter, Purdue's Ralph Bolden scored his second TD of the game with a 19-yard run. Michigan QB Forcier responded with a 6-yard TD run, but the point after touchdown attempt failed. Ralph Bolden scored his third touchdown of the day soon after with a 10-yard rush. Next, Purdue's Cortez Smith caught a 54-yard TD pass. In the fourth quarter, Purdue QB Joey Elliott ran in an 8-yard TD. Michigan's Minor then ran in a TD from 1-yard out. The Wolverines attempted to tie the game but Forcier failed to reach the end zone on a 2-point conversion, sealing the victory for the Boilermakers. It was Michigan's first home loss to Purdue since 1966.

| Statistics | PUR | MICH |
|---|---|---|
| First downs | 22 | 22 |
| Total yards | 494 | 427 |
| Rushing yards | 127 | 215 |
| Passing yards | 370 | 237 |
| Turnovers | 2 | 1 |
| Time of possession | 34:10 | 25:50 |

| Team | Category | Player | Statistics |
|---|---|---|---|
| Purdue | Passing | Joey Elliott | 28/39, 367 yards, 2 TD, 2 INT |
| Purdue | Rushing | Ralph Bolden | 16 rushes, 98 yards, 2 TD |
| Purdue | Receiving | Cortez Smith | 4 receptions, 85 yards, TD |
| Michigan | Passing | Tate Forcier | 15/24, 212 yards, TD |
| Michigan | Rushing | Brandon Minor | 19 rushes, 154 yards, 3 TD |
| Michigan | Receiving | Roy Roundtree | 10 receptions, 126 yards, TD |

=== At No. 20 Wisconsin ===
Michigan at No. 20 Wisconsin

| Team | 1 | 2 | 3 | 4 | Total |
|---|---|---|---|---|---|
| Wolverines | 7 | 10 | 7 | 0 | 24 |
| • No. 20 Badgers | 7 | 14 | 14 | 10 | 45 |

- Date: November 14
- Location: Camp Randall Stadium
  Madison, Wisconsin
- Game start: 12:00 pm
- Elapsed time: 3:03
- Game attendance: 80,540
- Game weather: 51 °F (11 °C), Partly Cloudy, S 8 MPH
- Referee: Bill LeMonnier
- TV announcers (BTN): Wayne Larrivee (Play-by-play), Chris Martin (Color) & Charissa Thompson (Sideline)

For their final road game of the season, the Wolverines traveled to Madison, Wisconsin to play the Wisconsin Badgers. Wisconsin scored first with a 22-yard TD pass by Scott Tolzien to Garrett Graham. Michigan tied the score with a 21-yard Tate Forcier TD pass to Vincent Smith. In the second quarter, the teams traded the lead. First, Michigan took the lead with a 37-yard Jason Olesnavage field goal. Wisconsin then went ahead with an 8-yard TD pass to Nick Toon. Michigan went back ahead when Ryan Van Bergen picked up Scott Tolzien's fumble (forced by Brandon Graham) and ran it back 14 yards for a touchdown. Wisconsin responded with a 1-yard TD run by John Clay, making the halftime score 21–17 Wisconsin.

In the third quarter, Toon scored another TD off a 15-yard catch. Michigan responded with a 10-yard catch by Ray Roundtree. Wisconsin then scored 17 unanswered points, starting with a 7-yard TD catch by Lance Kendricks. In the fourth quarter the Badgers sealed their victory with a 1-yard TD run by Tolzien and a 28-yard field goal by Philip Welch.

The game was Michigan's third straight loss at Wisconsin. It was also Michigan's 6th straight conference loss, the first time this has happened since the 1958–59 seasons. The Wolverines' record fell to 5–6; they needed to win next week to become bowl eligible.

| Statistics | MICH | WIS |
|---|---|---|
| First downs | 15 | 28 |
| Total yards | 265 | 469 |
| Rushing yards | 71 | 229 |
| Passing yards | 212 | 265 |
| Turnovers | 1 | 2 |
| Time of possession | 35:49 | 24:11 |

| Team | Category | Player | Statistics |
|---|---|---|---|
| Michigan | Passing | Tate Forcier | 20/26, 188 yards, 2 TD, INT |
| Michigan | Rushing | Denard Robinson | 5 rushes, 36 yards |
| Michigan | Receiving | Roy Roundtree | 7 receptions, 56 yards, TD |
| Wisconsin | Passing | Scott Tolzien | 16/24, 240 yards, 4 TD, INT |
| Wisconsin | Rushing | John Clay | 26 rushes, 151 yards, TD |
| Wisconsin | Receiving | Nick Toon | 5 receptions, 98 yards, 2 TD |

=== No. 9 Ohio State ===
No. 9 Ohio State at Michigan

| Team | 1 | 2 | 3 | 4 | Total |
|---|---|---|---|---|---|
| • No. 9 Buckeyes | 7 | 7 | 7 | 0 | 21 |
| Wolverines | 0 | 3 | 7 | 0 | 10 |

- Date: November 21
- Location: Michigan Stadium
  Ann Arbor, Michigan
- Game start: 12:00 pm
- Elapsed time: 3:10
- Game attendance: 110,922
- Game weather: 52 °F (11 °C), Mostly Cloudy, W 12 MPH
- Referee: D. Capron
- TV announcers (ABC): Sean McDonough (Play-by-play), Matt Millen (Color) & Holly Rowe (Sideline)

In the last game of the season, Michigan hosted their archrivals the No. 9 nationally ranked Ohio State Buckeyes, in the 106th meeting between the two teams. Ohio State scored first when Michigan QB Forcier fumbled while scrambling in the end zone; the ball was recovered by Ohio State's Cameron Heyward for a TD. Michigan's only score of the first half was a 46-yard field goal. Ohio State's Brandon Saine ran in a 29-yard TD late in the second quarter to make it 14–3 at halftime.

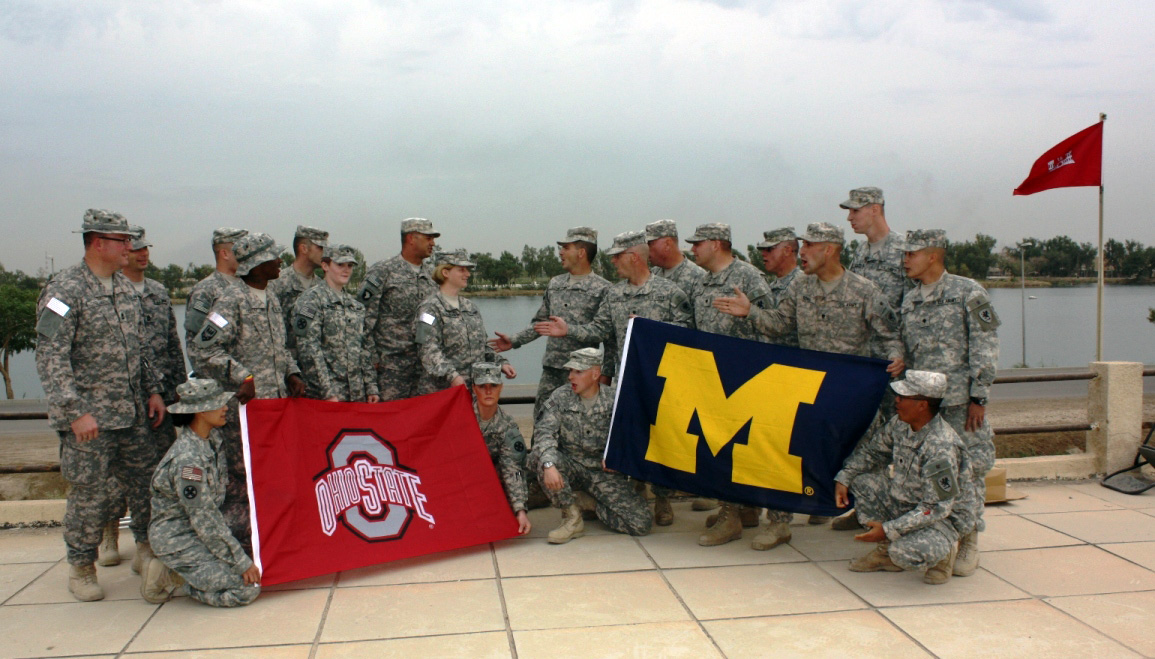
United States National Guard soldiers show that the Michigan-Ohio State rivalry reaches far and wide. (2009-11-16)

In the third quarter Michigan closed to within four off of Vincent Smith's 18-yard TD catch. Ohio State re-extended their lead to eleven a few minutes later with a 12-yard TD catch by Daniel Herron. Michigan attempted to come back in the fourth quarter, but all of their drives except the last were ended by interceptions. The Wolverines came closest with eight minutes left, when Forcier was intercepted in the end zone by Buckeye CB Devon Torrence. On their last play of the game, the Wolverines were penalized for being in an illegal formation with five players in the backfield; this penalty was declined, giving the ball back to Ohio State on downs and ending the game after the Buckeyes ran out the clock.

It was Ohio State's sixth straight win over Michigan, their longest winning streak of the series. QB Tate Forcier had perhaps his worst game this season, throwing four interceptions and turning over a fumble for a TD; prior to this game he had only thrown six interceptions all year. He became just the second Michigan quarterback to throw four interceptions against Ohio State in the last 60 years. Michigan's six-game losing streak to Ohio State is the third-longest streak to a single opponent in school history. The loss left Michigan's final record at 5–7, short of the six wins needed for bowl eligibility. During the game, Brandon Graham posted 5 solo tackles for a loss, to clinch the national statistical championship.

| Statistics | OSU | MICH |
|---|---|---|
| First downs | 18 | 16 |
| Total yards | 318 | 309 |
| Rushing yards | 251 | 80 |
| Passing yards | 104 | 234 |
| Turnovers | 1 | 5 |
| Time of possession | 32:56 | 27:04 |

| Team | Category | Player | Statistics |
|---|---|---|---|
| Ohio State | Passing | Terrelle Pryor | 9/17, 67 yards, TD, INT |
| Ohio State | Rushing | Daniel Herron | 19 rushes, 96 yards |
| Ohio State | Receiving | DeVier Posey | 5 receptions, 38 yards |
| Michigan | Passing | Tate Forcier | 23/38, 226 yards, TD, 4 INT |
| Michigan | Rushing | Vincent Smith | 8 rushes, 32 yards |
| Michigan | Receiving | Roy Roundtree | 9 receptions, 116 yards |

== Statistics ==
The offense rebounded from their 2008 performance to finish third in the Big Ten in scoring. However, Michigan ranked last in the Big Ten and 115th out of 120 Football Bowl Subdivision schools in turnover margin.

Graham was the national statistical champion in tackles for a loss (TFL) per game. Mesko led the Big Ten in punting average and Graham led the conference in total tackles for a loss. Graham posted 26 TFLs in 12 games, which led the nation with 2.17 average tackles for a loss per game (ahead of conference rival O'Brien Schofield who was second with 1.884). Graham also defended his Big Ten total TFLs championship over Schofield by a 26–24.5 margin. Mesko led the Big Ten in punting average and was eighth in the nation with a 44.46 average.

The per game team rankings below include 120 Football Bowl Subdivision teams and 11 Big Ten Conference teams:

| Category | National Rank | Actual | National Leader | Actual | Conference Rank | Big Ten Conference Leader | Actual |
| Rushing Offense | 25 | 186.17 | Nevada | 344.92 | 4 | Wisconsin | 203.85 |
| Passing Offense | 81 | 198.33 | Houston | 433.71 | 9 | Northwestern | 286.54 |
| Total offense | 59 | 384.50 | Houston | 563.36 | 7 | Wisconsin | 416.92 |
| Scoring Offense | 41 | 29.50 | Houston | 42.21 | 3 | Wisconsin | 31.77 |
| Rushing Defense | 91 | 171.92 | Texas | 72.36 | 10 | Wisconsin | 88.23 |
| Pass Efficiency Defense | 70 | 131.79 | Nebraska | 87.28 | 8 | Iowa | 89.99 |
| Total Defense | 82 | 393.33 | TCU | 239.69 | 9 | Ohio St. | 262.31 |
| Scoring Defense | 77 | 27.50 | Nebraska | 10.43 | 8 | Penn St. | 12.23 |
| Net Punting | 3 | 40.93 | Georgia | 41.95 | 1 | Michigan | 40.93 |
| Punt returns | 62 | 8.67 | LSU | 18.85 | 3 | Minnesota | 14.67 |
| Kickoff returns | 23 | 23.80 | TCU | 29.24 | 3 | Michigan St. | 25.85 |
| Turnover Margin | 115 | −1.00 | Air Force | 1.69 | 11 | Ohio St. | 1.31 |
| Pass defense | 67 | 221.42 | Eastern Mich. | 150.50 | 7 | Iowa | 152.92 |
| Passing Efficiency | 76 | 124.09 | Florida | 167.31 | 8 | Michigan St. | 145.01 |
| Sacks | 68 | 1.83 | Pittsburgh | 3.62 | 9 | Penn St. | 2.85 |
| Tackles For Loss | 20 | 7.00 | Rutgers | 8.69 | 3 | Penn St. | 8.08 |
| Sacks Allowed | 83 | 2.33 | Boise St. | .36 | 8 | Michigan St. | 1.08 |

The per game rankings below include players who have played in 75% of team's games and are ranked in the top 100 national leaders and top 25 conference leaders:

| Category | Player | National Rank | Actual | National Leader | Actual | Conference Rank | Big Ten Conference Leader | Actual |
| Rushing | Brandon Minor | | 50.20 | Ryan Mathews | 150.67 | 11 | John Clay | 116.69 |
| | Carlos Brown | | 43.64 | | | 14 | | |
| | Vincent Smith | | 30.67 | | | 18 | | |
| | Denard Robinson | | 29.25 | | | 19 | | |
| Passing Efficiency (Min. 15 Att./Game) | Tate Forcier | 64 | 128.15 | Tim Tebow | 164.17 | 9 | Scott Tolzien | 142.99 |
| Total offense | Tate Forcier | 80 | 190.83 | Case Keenum | 416.36 | 10 | Mike Kafka | 286.54 |
| | Brandon Minor | | 50.20 | | | 22 | | |
| | Denard Robinson | | 44.92 | | | 24 | | |
| | Carlos Brown | | 43.64 | | | 25 | | |
| Receptions Per Game | Roy Roundtree | | 2.91 | Freddie Barnes | 11.92 | 21 | Keith Smith (Purdue) | 7.58 |
| Receiving Yards Per Game | Roy Roundtree | | 39.45 | Danario Alexander | 137.00 | 22 | Smith (Purdue) | 91.67 |
| Interceptions | Donovan Warren | T-49 | .33 | Rahim Moore | .77 | T-6 | Sherrick McManis | .50 |
| | Jonas Mouton | | .18 | | | T-18 | | |
| Punting (Min. 3.6 Punts/Game) | Zoltan Mesko | 8 | 44.46 | Drew Butler | 48.05 | 1 | Mesko (Michigan) | 44.46 |
| Punt returns (Min. 1.2 Ret./Game) | | | | Greg Reid | 18.43 | | Colin Sandeman | 9.00 |
| Kickoff returns (Min. 1.2 Ret./Game) | Darryl Stonum | T-32 | 25.67 | Ray Fisher | 37.35 | 3 | Fisher (Indiana) | 37.35 |
| Field goals | Jason Olesnavage | T-85 | .92 | Kai Forbath | 2.15 | 10 | Daniel Murray | 1.46 |
| Scoring | Jason Olesnavage | | 6.25 | Toby Gerhart | 13.23 | 10 | Clay (Wisconsin) | 8.31 |
| | Brandon Minor | | 4.80 | | | T-13 | | |
| All-Purpose Runners | Darryl Stonum | 100 | 100.00 | Damaris Johnson | 224.42 | 6 | Tandon Doss | 138.83 |
| Sacks | Brandon Graham | 14 | .88 | Von Miller | 1.31 | 4 | Ryan Kerrigan | 1.08 |
| | Ryan Van Bergen | | .42 | | | 15 | | |
| Tackles | Stevie Brown | | 6.67 | Carmen Messina | 13.50 | 20 | Greg Jones | 11.85 |
| Tackles For Loss | Brandon Graham | 1 | 2.17 | Graham (Michigan) | 2.17 | 1 | Graham (Michigan) | 2.17 |
| | Mike Martin | | .71 | | | T-23 | | |

== Postseason recognition ==
At the conclusion of the season, Graham earned the Chicago Tribune Silver Football Big Ten co-MVP award. Graham and Mesko earned numerous 2009 College Football All-America Team recognitions. Several Michigan players earned 2009 All-Big Ten Conference recognition: Graham and Mesko were first-team (coaches and media). Donovan Warren (first-team media and second-team coaches) and Schilling (honorable mention coaches and media) were also recognized. Mesko was a first-team Academic All-American. Graham also earned the MVP award at the January 30, 2010 Senior Bowl.

Graham was co-winner of the Chicago Tribune Silver Football as the Big Ten co-MVPs with Penn State's Daryll Clark, marking the first time the award has been shared. Three Michigan players, Warren (Junior cornerback), Brandon Graham (Senior defensive end), and Mesko (Senior punter) were named to the All Big Ten First Team, and Stephen Schilling (Senior left guard) received honorable mention. Offensive lineman David Moosman also received the Big Ten Sportsmanship Award. Mesko was one of fifteen FBS athletes selected as a first-team Academic All-American. Michigan had 10 athletes recognized as fall term of the 2009–10 Academic All-Conference selections for being letterwinners who are in at least their second academic year at their institution and carry a cumulative grade point average: Matt Cavanaugh, Jon Conover, John Ferrara, J.B. Fitzgerald, Will Heininger, Zac Johnson, Zoltan Mesko, Tim North, Jason Olesnavage, and Mike Therman. Seniors Zoltan Mesko (2nd team WCFF, Scout, Rivals, AP; honorable mention SI, CFN, PFW) and Brandon Graham (1st team Scout, Rivals; 2nd team WCFF, AP, SI, CFN; honorable mention PFW) were named All-Americans by the Walter Camp Football Foundation, Associated Press, Sports Illustrated, Pro Football Weekly, Rivals.com & Scout.com. Graham was also a first team selection by ESPN and a second team selection by the Sporting News. Brandon Graham earned MVP honors at the January 30, 2010 Senior Bowl with five tackles, two sacks, one forced fumble.

In December 2009, Warren declared himself eligible for the 2010 NFL draft. Other athletes to participate at the NFL Scouting Combine were Graham, Mesko and Minor. Graham, Mesko and Stevie Brown were drafted 13th, 150th and 251st overall, respectively. Warren went undrafted but signed with the New York Jets as an undrafted free agent.

== 2010 NFL draft ==
Co-captains Graham, Mesko and Brown were drafted in the 2010 NFL Draft, and immediately following the draft Donovan Warren was signed by the New York Jets. Other draft weekend free agent signees included Mathews and Brandon Minor with the Chicago Bears, Mark Ortmann with the Carolina Panthers, Moosman with the Arizona Cardinals and Carlos Brown with the New Orleans Saints.

| Round | Pick # | NFL team | Player | Position |
|---|---|---|---|---|
| 1 | 13 | Philadelphia Eagles ^{(from San Francisco via Denver)} | Brandon Graham | Defensive end |
| 5 | 150 | New England Patriots ^{(from Houston)} | Zoltan Mesko | Punter |
| 7 | 251 | Oakland Raiders | Stevie Brown | Safety |

== Roster ==
2009 Michigan Wolverines roster
| Quarterbacks: 5 Tate Forcier – Freshman; 8 Nick Sheridan – (redshirt) Junior; 14 Nader Furrha – Freshman; 16 Denard Robinson – Freshman; 17 David Cone – (redshirt) Junior; 20 Jack Kennedy – (redshirt) Freshman; Running backs: 2 Vincent Smith – Freshman; 4 Brandon Minor – Senior; 15 Michael Cox – (redshirt) Freshman; 20 Michael Shaw – Sophomore; 23 Carlos Brown – Senior; 24 Kevin Grady – (redshirt) Senior; 28 Fitzgerald Toussaint – Freshman; 32 O'Neil Swanson – Freshman; 49 Benjamin Sutton – (redshirt) Junior; Fullbacks: 36 Johnny Childers – Freshman; 44 Mark Moundros – (redshirt) Junior; 49 John McColgan – (redshirt) Sophomore; Slot receivers: 7 Terrence Robinson – (redshirt) Freshman; 10 Jeremy Gallon -Freshman; 12 Roy Roundtree - (redshirt) Freshman; 19 Kelvin Grady - (redshirt) Sophomore; 26 Nick Koenigsknecht - (redshirt) Junior; 27 Jordan Owens -Freshman; 30 Doug Rogan - (redshirt) Sophomore; 37 Ricky Reyes - (redshirt) Senior; Wide receivers: 6 Je'Ron Stokes-Freshman; 9 Martavious Odoms-Sophomore; 13 Greg Mathews-Senior; 18 James Rogers-Junior; 21 Junior Hemingway- (redshirt) Sophomore; 22 Darryl Stonum-Sophomore; 40 Zac Baker-Senior; 82 LaTerryal Savoy-Senior; 83 Jon Conover- (redshirt) Junior; 84 Cameron Gordon-Freshman; 85 Joe Reynolds-Freshman; 89 Patrick Collins- (redshirt) Sophomore; Tight ends: 46 Jon Bills- (redshirt) Sophomore; 80 Martell Webb-Junior; 86 Kevin Koger-Sophomore; 88 Brandon Moore- (redshirt) Freshman | Offensive line: 50 David Molk – (redshirt) Sophomore; 50 Ohene Opong-Owusu- (redshirt) Senior; 52 Stephen Schilling – (redshirt) Junior; 54 Jareth Glanda-Freshman; 56 Ricky Barnum- (redshirt) Freshman; 57 Elliot Mealer- (redshirt) Freshman; 59 Tom Lindley-Freshman; 60 David Moosman- (redshirt) Senior; 61 Zac Ciullo- (redshirt) Sophomore; 62 Tim McAvoy- (redshirt) Senior; 63 Rocko Khoury- (redshirt) Freshman; 65 Patrick Omameh- (redshirt) Freshman; 66 Christian Brandt-Freshman; 67 Adam Barker-Freshman; 69 Erik Gunderson-Freshman; 70 Bryant Nowicki- (redshirt) Junior; 71 Mark Ortmann- (redshirt) Senior (C); 72 Mark Huyge- (redshirt) Sophomore; 74 John Ferrara- (redshirt) Junior; 75 Michael Schofield-Freshman; 76 Quinton Washington-Freshman; 77 Taylor Lewan-Freshman; 79 Perry Dorrestein- (redshirt) Junior; 91 Tom Pomarico- (redshirt) Sophomore; Linebackers: 3 Stevie Brown-Senior (C); 4 Brandon Smith- (redshirt) Freshman; 7 Brandin Hawthorne-Freshman; 8 Jonas Mouton - (redshirt) Junior; 25 Kenny Demens- (redshirt) Freshman; 26 Isaiah Bell-Freshman; 27 Mike Jones-Freshman; 36 Rusheed Furrha- (redshirt) Sophomore; 42 J.B. Fitzgerald-Sophomore; 45 Obi Ezeh- (redshirt) Junior; 52 Kevin Leach- (redshirt) Sophomore; 58 Brandon Herron- (redshirt) Sophomore; 59 Paul Gyarmati- (redshirt) Freshman; Outside linebackers: 81 Steve Watson- (redshirt) Sophomore; 88 Craig Roh-Freshman; 96 Mike Therman- (redshirt) Junior | Defensive ends: 39 Will Heininger - (redshirt) Sophomore; 55 Brandon Graham -Senior (C); 67 Nathan Brink -Freshman; 89 Tim North - (redshirt) Senior; 90 Anthony LaLota -Freshman; 99 Adam Patterson - (redshirt) Junior; Defensive tackles: 53 Ryan Van Bergen- (redshirt) Sophomore; 62 Dominique Ware- (redshirt) Sophomore; 68 Mike Martin-Sophomore; 73 William Campbell-Freshman; 92 Greg Banks- (redshirt) Junior; 95 Renaldo Sagesse-Junior; Cornerbacks: 2 J.T. Turner-Freshman; 6 Donovan Warren-Junior; 12 J.T. Floyd- (redshirt) Freshman; 14 Teric Jones-Freshman; 17 Tony Anderson- (redshirt) Sophomore; 19 Zac Johnson- (redshirt) Sophomore; 42 Al Backey-Freshman; Safeties: 5 Vladimir Emilien-Freshman; 15 Thomas Gordon-Freshman; 21 Jordan Reilly- (redshirt) Sophomore; 23 Floyd Simmons- (redshirt) Freshman; 28 Matthew Cavanaugh- (redshirt) Freshman; 29 Troy Woolfolk-Junior; 31 Jared Van Slyke- (redshirt) Sophomore; 32 Jordan Kovacs- (redshirt) Freshman; 35 Karl Tech- (redshirt) Sophomore; 40 Mike Williams- (redshirt) Sophomore; Punters: 30 Chris Berry- (redshirt) Junior; 41 Zoltan Mesko- (redshirt) Senior (C); Place kickers: 34 Brendan Gibbons -Freshman; 43 Bryan Wright- (redshirt) Junior; 93 Kris Pauloski-Freshman; 97 Scott Schrimsher- (redshirt) Sophomore; Kickers: 46 Seth Broekhuizen-Freshman; 92 Jason Olesnavage- (redshirt) Senior; Long snappers: 66 George Morales- (redshirt) Freshman; 94 Curt Graman-Freshman | Head coach: Rich Rodriguez; Coordinators/Assistant coaches: Calvin Magee -Associate head coach, Offensive Coordinator; Greg Robinson – Defensive coordinator; Tony Dews – Wide receivers coach; Greg Frey – Offensive line coach; Tony Gibson – Assistant head coach, secondary coach; Jay Hopson – Linebackers coach; Fred Jackson – Running backs coach; Rod Smith – Quarterbacks coach; Bruce Tall – Defensive line coach; Legend: (C) Team captain; Redshirt; Roster Last update: 2009-12-11 |

On December 12, 2008, RB Sam McGuffie announced he was leaving Michigan for a school closer to home because of family issues. On February 16, 2009, starting quarterback Steven Threet told Michigan he would transfer before the start of the 2009 season. On October 27, 2009, starting cornerback Boubacar Cissoko was kicked off the team for missing class, workouts and study table according to his high school coach Thomas Wilcher. He also stated that he expected Cissoko to seek a transfer.
