= Mark Ortmann =

American football player (born 1986)

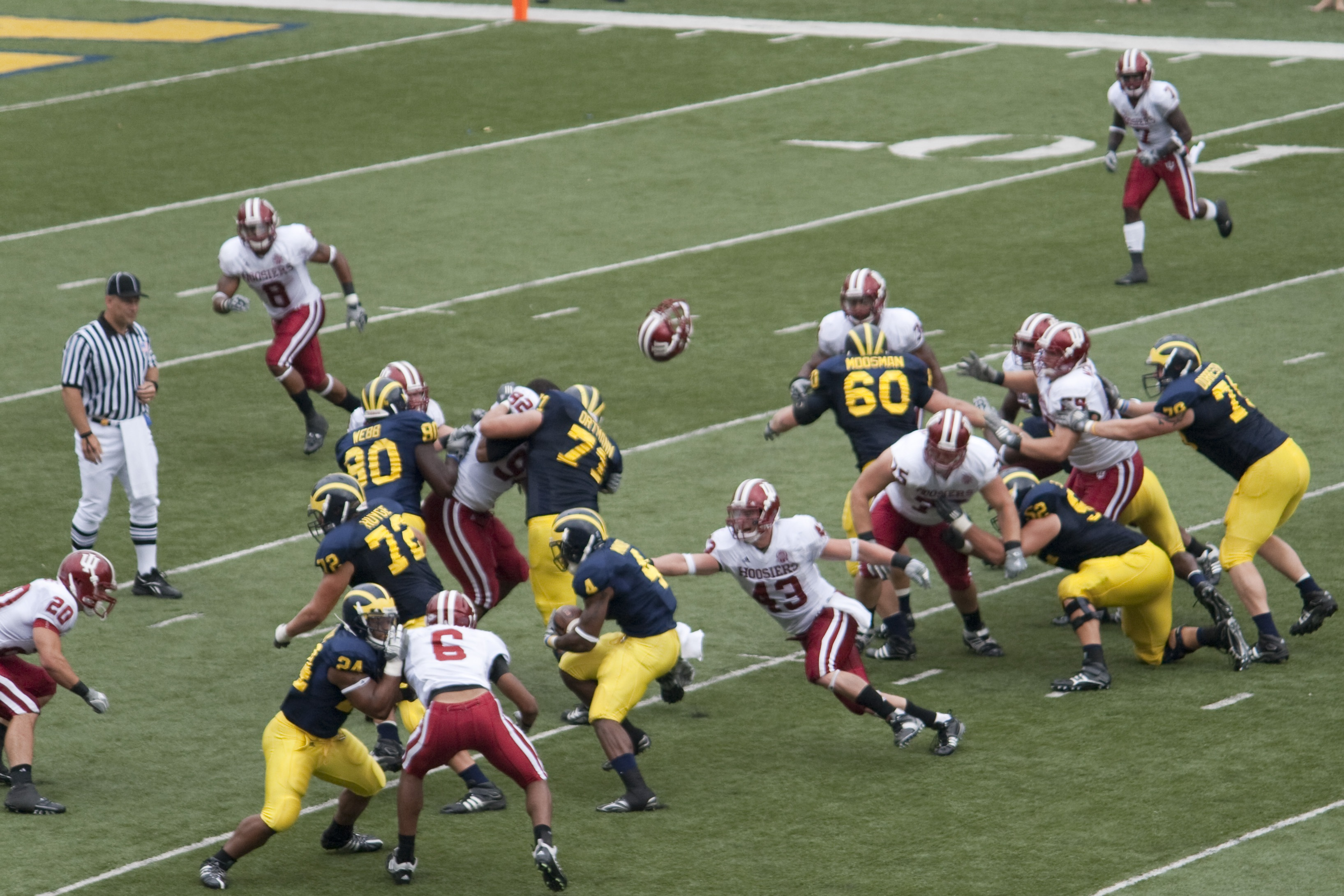
- Ortmann (71) is pictured knocking the helmet off of Indiana Hoosier Greg Middleton

No. 71
- Position: Offensive tackle

Personal information
- Born: June 24, 1986 (age 40)
- Listed height: 6 ft 6 in (1.98 m)
- Listed weight: 305 lb (138 kg)

Career information
- High school: Klein (TX)
- College: Michigan
- NFL draft: 2010: undrafted

Career history
- Carolina Panthers (2010)*; Atlanta Falcons (2010)*
- * Offseason or practice squad member only

Mark William Ortmann (born June 24, 1986) is an American former football offensive tackle. He was signed by the Carolina Panthers as an undrafted free agent after the 2010 NFL Draft, and was waived two months later. He later signed with the Atlanta Falcons on August 23, 2010, but was waived on August 28. He had previously played four years for the Michigan Wolverines football team, where he was a regular starter at offensive tackle as a redshirt junior and senior for the 2008 and 2009 teams.

== Early life ==
In high school, Ortmann played both tight end and offensive tackle at Klein High School in Klein, Texas where he also threw the discus (he was district champion as a junior) and shot put. Ranked as the number 43 offensive tackle in the nation and the number 90 player in the state of Texas according to rivals.com. He was a member of the National Honor Society as well as the Latin National Honor Society in high school.

College recruiting
Name	Hometown	School	Height	Weight	40^{‡}	Commit date
Mark Ortmann; OT	Klein, Texas	Klein (TX)	6 ft 6.5 in (1.99 m)	270 lb (120 kg)	5.13	Dec 12, 2004
Mark Ortmann; OT	Recruit ratings: Scout: Rivals: (NR)					
Overall recruit ranking: Scout: NR Rivals: 43 (OT), 90 (TX) ESPN: NR
Note: In many cases, Scout, Rivals, 247Sports, On3, and ESPN may conflict in their listings of height and weight.; In these cases, the average was taken. ESPN grades are on a 100-point scale.; Sources: "Michigan Football Commitments". Rivals.; "2005 Michigan Football Commits". Scout.; "ESPN". ESPN.; "Scout.com Team Recruiting Rankings". Scout.; "2005 Team Ranking". Rivals.com.

== College career ==
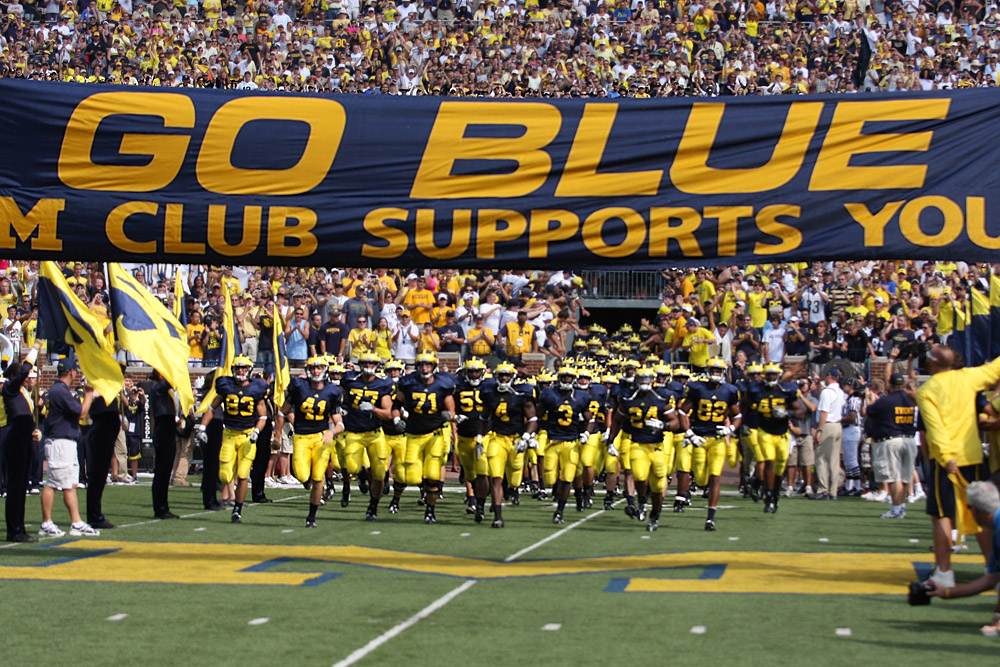
Ortmann (71) is among those storming the field with the 2009 Michigan Wolverines football team as it enters Michigan Stadium.

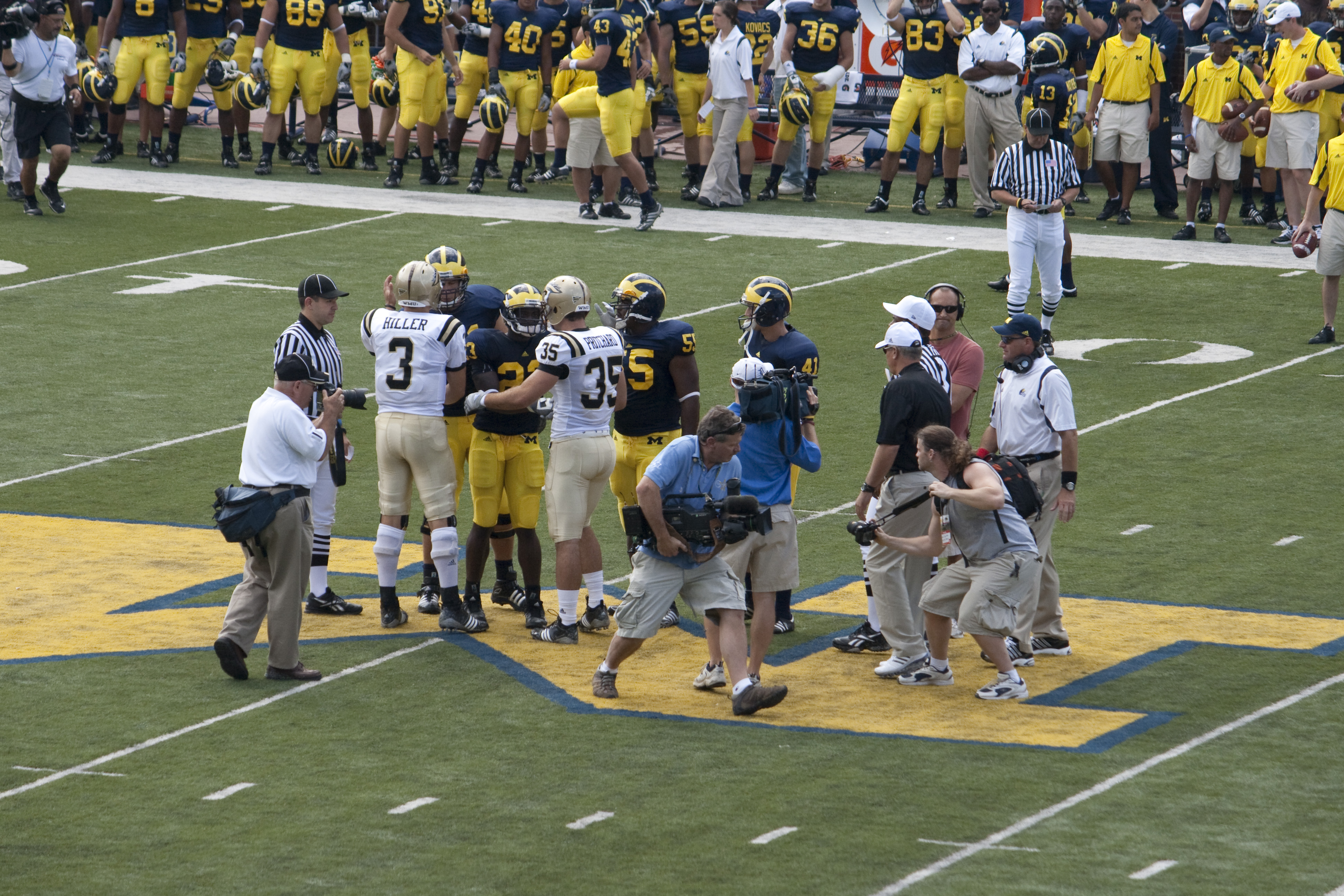
Ortman during pregame coin toss with teammates Carlos Brown, Brandon Graham and Zoltan Mesko as well as Tim Hiller.

At Michigan, he was a three-year letterman, playing in 36 career contests, starting in 25 career games: made 21 starts at left tackle, two at right tackle and two at left guard during his career. He was elected captain as a fifth-year senior. During the October 31, 2009 game against the Illinois Fighting Illini he was involved in controversy when a punch he threw to the groin of Corey Liuget who had recovered a fumble became a noted video on YouTube. The action was expected to result in a suspension. No suspension was served. He served as co-captain with Brandon Graham, Zoltan Mesko and Stevie Brown. Following the season, he was a co-recipient, along with Stephen Schilling, of the Hugh R. Rader Jr. Award as Michigan's top offensive linemen. As a senior, he represented Texas in the February 6, 2010 Texas vs. The Nation Game.

== Professional career ==
Ortmann signed as an undrafted free agent with the Carolina Panthers on April 24, 2010, after going undrafted in the 2010 NFL draft. He was waived on June 17, 2010. The New England Patriots worked Ortmann out on August 3, 2010. Ortmann signed as an undrafted free agent with the Atlanta Falcons on August 23, 2010, after Quinn Ojinnaka was traded to the New England Patriots. He was waived by the team on August 28.
