= Chuckie Miller =

American football player (born 1965)

No. 28
- Position: Cornerback

Personal information
- Born: May 9, 1965 (age 61); Anniston, Alabama, U.S.
- Listed height: 5 ft 8 in (1.73 m)
- Listed weight: 180 lb (82 kg)

Career information
- High school: Long Beach Polytechnic (Long Beach, California)
- College: UCLA
- NFL draft: 1987: 8th round, 200th overall pick

Career history
- Indianapolis Colts (1987–1989); Detroit Lions (1990)*
- * Offseason or practice squad member only
- Stats at Pro Football Reference

Charles Elliot Miller (born May 9, 1965) is an American former professional football cornerback who played in the National Football League (NFL) for the Indianapolis Colts during the 1988 - 1989 NFL season after being drafted in the 1987 NFL draft by them in the eighth round with the 200th overall pick. Leonard Russell, 1991 NFL Offensive Rookie Of The Year, is his cousin. Donovan Warren is his nephew. Miller played high school football at Polytechnic High School in Long Beach, California and college football for the UCLA Bruins football team.
