= Stevie Brown =

American football player (born 1987)

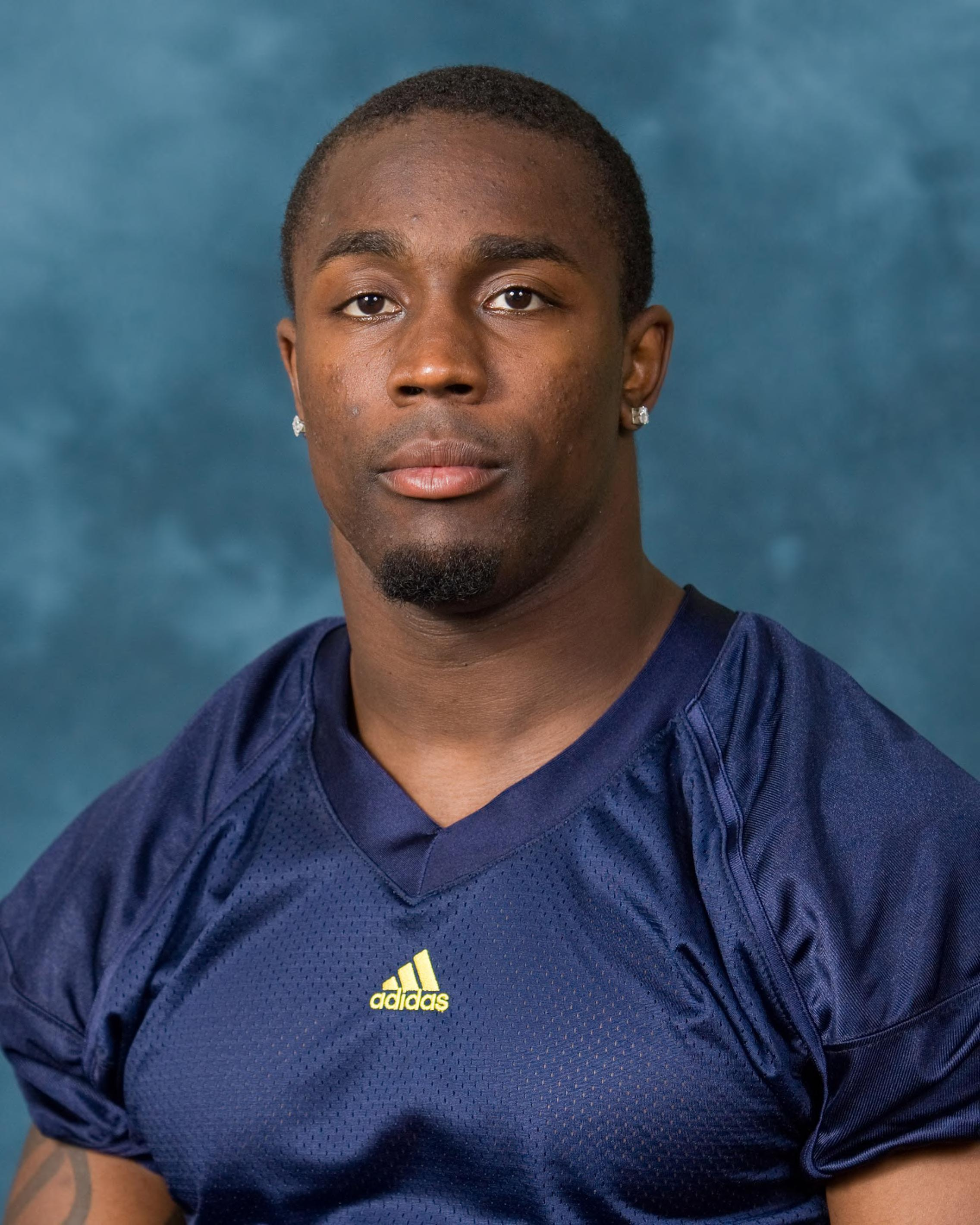
- Brown in 2008

No. 27, 28
- Position: Safety

Personal information
- Born: July 17, 1987 (age 39); Dallas, Texas, U.S.
- Listed height: 5 ft 11 in (1.80 m)
- Listed weight: 215 lb (98 kg)

Career information
- High school: Columbus East (Columbus, Indiana)
- College: Michigan
- NFL draft: 2010: 7th round, 251st overall pick

Career history
- Oakland Raiders (2010); Carolina Panthers (2011)*; Indianapolis Colts (2011); New York Giants (2012–2014); Houston Texans (2015)*; New York Giants (2015)*; Kansas City Chiefs (2016)*; Carolina Panthers (2016)*
- * Offseason or practice squad member only

Career NFL statistics
- Total tackles: 149
- Sacks: 1.0
- Forced fumbles: 2
- Fumble recoveries: 2
- Interceptions: 8
- Stats at Pro Football Reference

Stevie Christopher Brown (born July 17, 1987) is an American former professional football player who was a safety in the National Football League (NFL). He was selected by the Oakland Raiders in the seventh round of the 2010 NFL draft. He played college football for the Michigan Wolverines, starting at safety as a junior for the 2008 team and at linebacker for the 2009 team. He was also a member of the Carolina Panthers, Houston Texans, Indianapolis Colts, New York Giants, and Kansas City Chiefs.

== Early life ==
In high school, he was a three-year starter for head coach Bob Gaddis at Columbus East High School in Columbus, Indiana. He gained 1,700 all-purpose yards as a junior in 2004 and scored 17 touchdowns, while recording 30 solo tackles and three interceptions. Despite only playing three games due to injury as a senior he was selected first-team all-state. He participated in the 2006 U.S. Army All-American Bowl. Also all-state by the Indiana Coaches Association and by the Associated Press as a junior. Ranked as the number 7 safety and the second-best player in the state of Indiana according to rivals.com. Ranked as the number 10 cornerback in the nation by scout.com. Qualified for the state finals as a sophomore in the 200 meters and finished seventh in the state in the 100 meters a junior. As a sophomore, he had 10 interceptions.

College recruiting
Name	Hometown	School	Height	Weight	40^{‡}	Commit date
Stevie Brown; S/CB	Columbus, Indiana	Columbus (IN)	6 ft 0.5 in (1.84 m)	198.5 lb (90.0 kg)	4.395	Aug 1, 2005
Stevie Brown; S/CB	Recruit ratings: Scout: Rivals: (NR)					
Overall recruit ranking: Scout: 10 (CB) Rivals: 7 (S), 2 (IN) ESPN: NR
Note: In many cases, Scout, Rivals, 247Sports, On3, and ESPN may conflict in their listings of height and weight.; In these cases, the average was taken. ESPN grades are on a 100-point scale.; Sources: "Michigan Football Commitments". Rivals.; "2006 Michigan Football Commits". Scout.; "ESPN". ESPN.; "Scout.com Team Recruiting Rankings". Scout.; "2006 Team Ranking". Rivals.com.

== College career ==
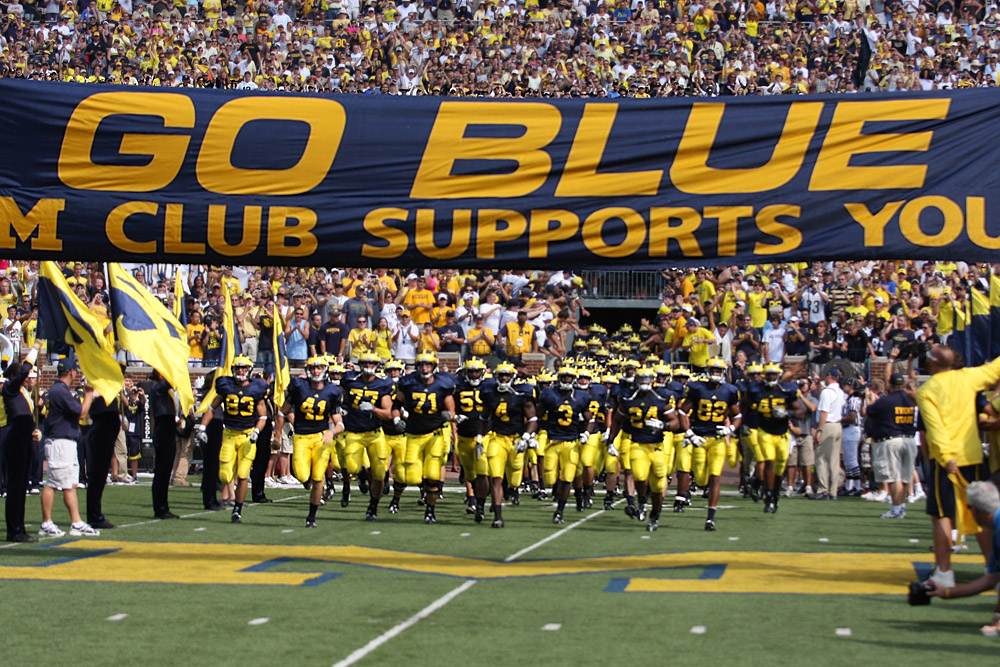
Brown (3) leads the 2009 Michigan Wolverines football team onto the field

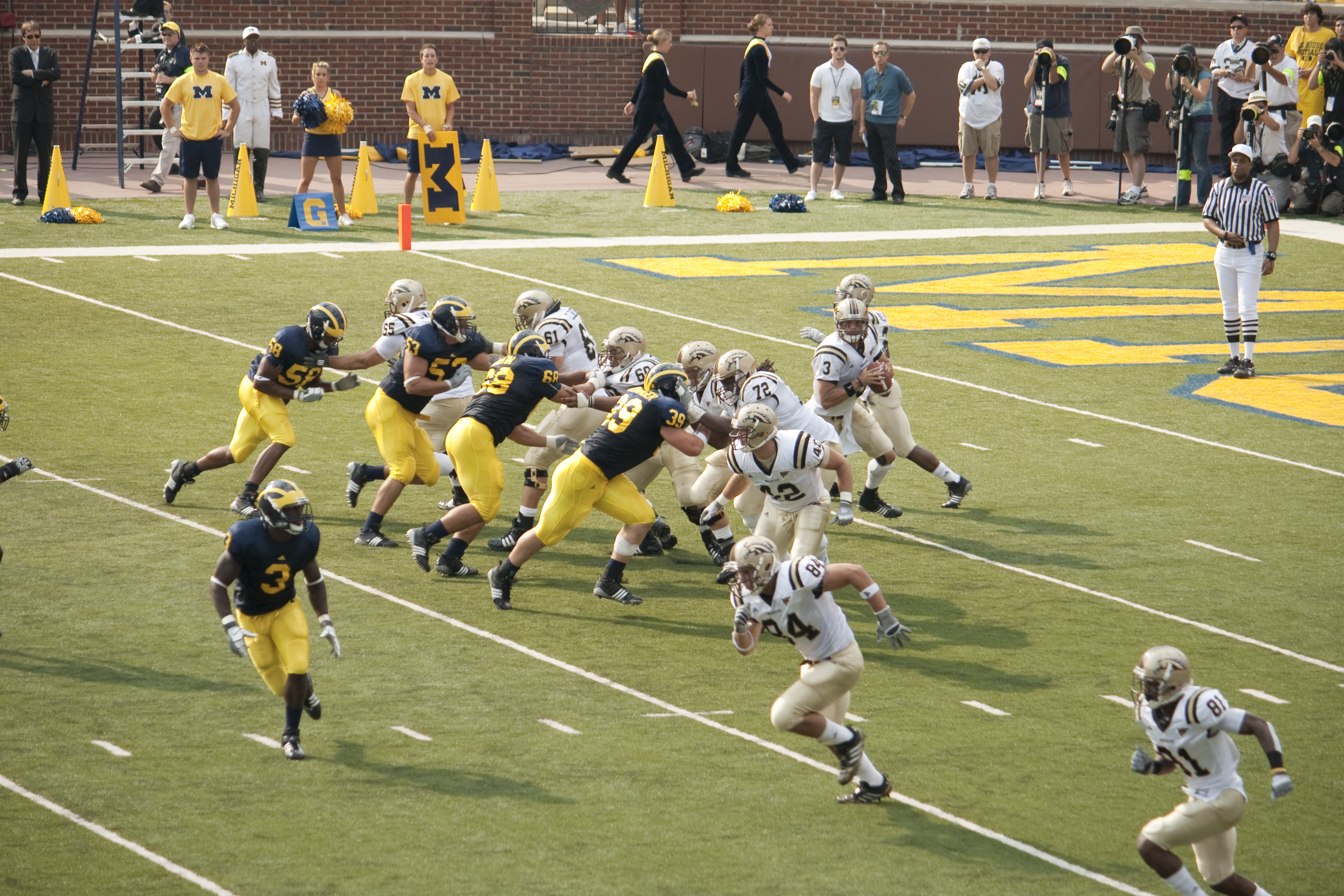
Brown (3) drops back in coverage while Tim Hiller rolls out

At the University of Michigan, he was elected captain as a senior. Over the course of his career he had 31 special teams tackles, including 11 as a sophomore when he led the 2007 team. As a senior, he led the 2009 Wolverines in tackles with 80. He recorded nine tackles in four different conference games (against Indiana - September 26, Michigan State - October 3, Purdue - November 7, Wisconsin - November 14) during the 2009 Big Ten Conference football season. He was named the 2009 winner of The Roger Zatkoff Award as the team's best linebacker.

== Professional career ==
Pre-draft measurables
Height	Weight	40-yard dash	10-yard split	20-yard split	20-yard shuttle	Three-cone drill	Vertical jump	Broad jump	Bench press
5 ft 11 1/4 in (1.81 m)	212 lb (96 kg)	4.51 s	1.51 s	2.62 s	4.33 s	6.92 s	34.5 in (0.88 m)	10 ft 2 in (3.10 m)	23 reps
All values from Pro Day

=== Oakland Raiders ===
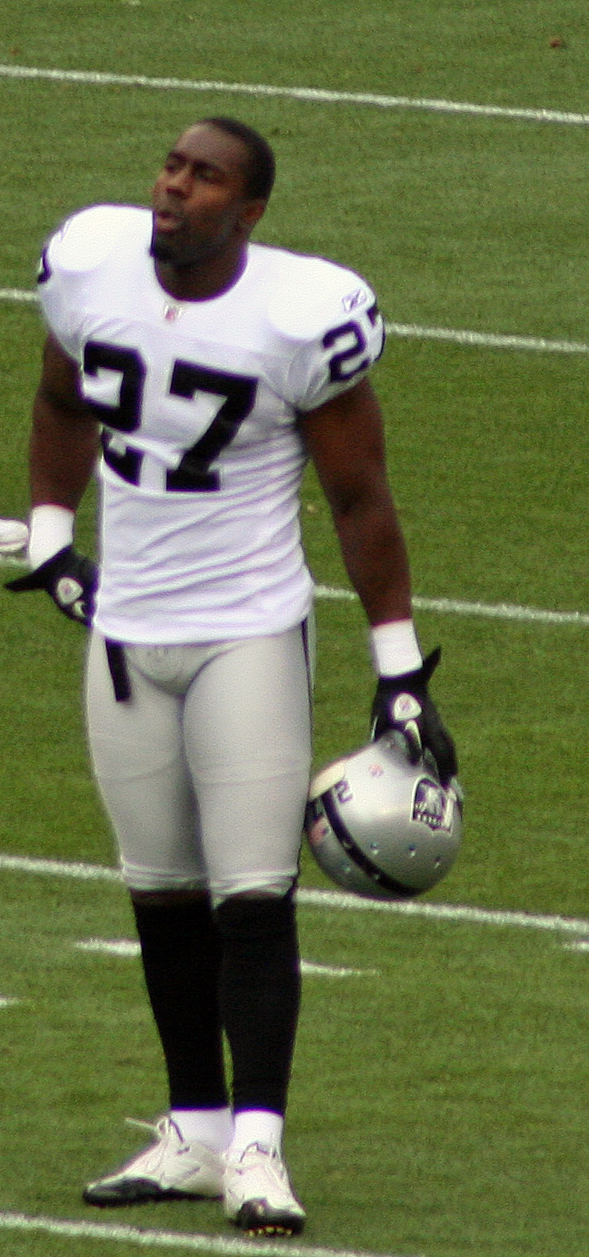
Brown with the Oakland Raiders in 2010

Brown was selected in the seventh round of the 2010 NFL draft by the Oakland Raiders with the 251st overall selection. His signing was announced on July 22. In his first game as a professional, he made an interception to end an exhibition game against the Dallas Cowboys. The Raiders released him on September 4 and signed him to their practice squad on September 5. A few weeks later Stevie Brown was signed to the 2010 Raiders and debuted on September 19, 2010, against the St. Louis Rams and recorded his first career tackle. After playing in his first year as a rookie he recorded 29 tackles including a game against the San Diego Chargers where he recorded 5 total tackles.

The Raiders released Brown on September 3, 2011, as part of their final cutdowns.

=== Carolina Panthers (first stint) ===
He was claimed off waivers by the Carolina Panthers on September 4, but was waived on September 7.

=== Indianapolis Colts ===
The Indianapolis Colts signed Brown on September 20, 2011.

=== New York Giants (first stint) ===
The New York Giants signed Stevie Brown on April 2, 2012. While replacing an injured Kenny Phillips for the early part of the 2012 NFL season, Brown led the entire NFL in takeaways at seven, with five interceptions and two fumble recoveries as of October 28, 2012 (through week 8). In the eighth week on October 28 against the Dallas Cowboys, Brown had two interceptions and a fumble recovery. The following day, he was named National Football Conference (NFC) Defensive Player of the Week. Against the New Orleans Saints and Drew Brees on December 9, Brown had 2 interceptions and a forced fumble and established a Giants franchise record for single-season interception return yards (259). On December 30 against the Philadelphia Eagles, Brown returned a Michael Vick forward pass 48 yards to ignite a 42–7 rout, earning him a second NFC Defensive Player of the Week recognition on January 2.

He finished the season with 307 return yards, which ranked as the fourth highest single-season total in NFL history. His 8 interceptions, second in the NFL, were the most by a Giant in a season since the 1968 Giants got 10 interceptions from Willie Williams and 8 from Spider Lockhart. In addition, this led the entire NFL, with nearly twice as many interception-return-yards as second-place Ronde Barber of the Tampa Bay Buccaneers. Brown signed his $2.023 million one-year restricted free agent tender on March 19, 2013.

During a pre-season game on August 24, 2013, against the New York Jets, Brown tore the ACL in his left knee and missed the entire season. He re-signed with the Giants on a one-year contract on March 11, 2014.

=== Houston Texans ===
Brown signed with the Houston Texans on May 1, 2015. He was cut by the Texans on August 28, 2015.

=== New York Giants (second stint) ===
Brown re-signed with the Giants on August 31, 2015. He was waived on September 7.

=== Kansas City Chiefs ===
On April 1, 2016, Browns signed with the Kansas City Chiefs. On August 25, 2016, Brown was released by the Chiefs.

=== Carolina Panthers (second stint) ===
On August 31, 2016, Brown was signed by the Panthers. On September 3, 2016, he was released by the Panthers as part of final roster cuts.

== NFL career statistics ==
Legend
	Led the league
**Bold**	Career high

Year	Team	Games		Tackles					Interceptions					Fumbles			
Year	Team	GP	GS	Cmb	Solo	Ast	Sck	TFL	Int	Yds	TD	Lng	PD	FF	FR	Yds	TD
2010	OAK	15	1	30	25	5	0.0	0	0	0	0	0	2	0	0	0	0
2011	IND	8	0	5	4	1	0.0	0	0	0	0	0	0	0	0	0	0
2012	NYG	**16**	**11**	**76**	**64**	**12**	0.0	**3**	**8**	**307**	0	**70**	**11**	**2**	**2**	**9**	0
2014	NYG	**16**	8	38	30	8	**1.0**	2	0	0	0	0	1	0	0	0	0
Career		55	20	149	123	26	1.0	5	8	307	0	70	14	2	2	9	0
