= Glenn Winston =

American football player (born 1989)

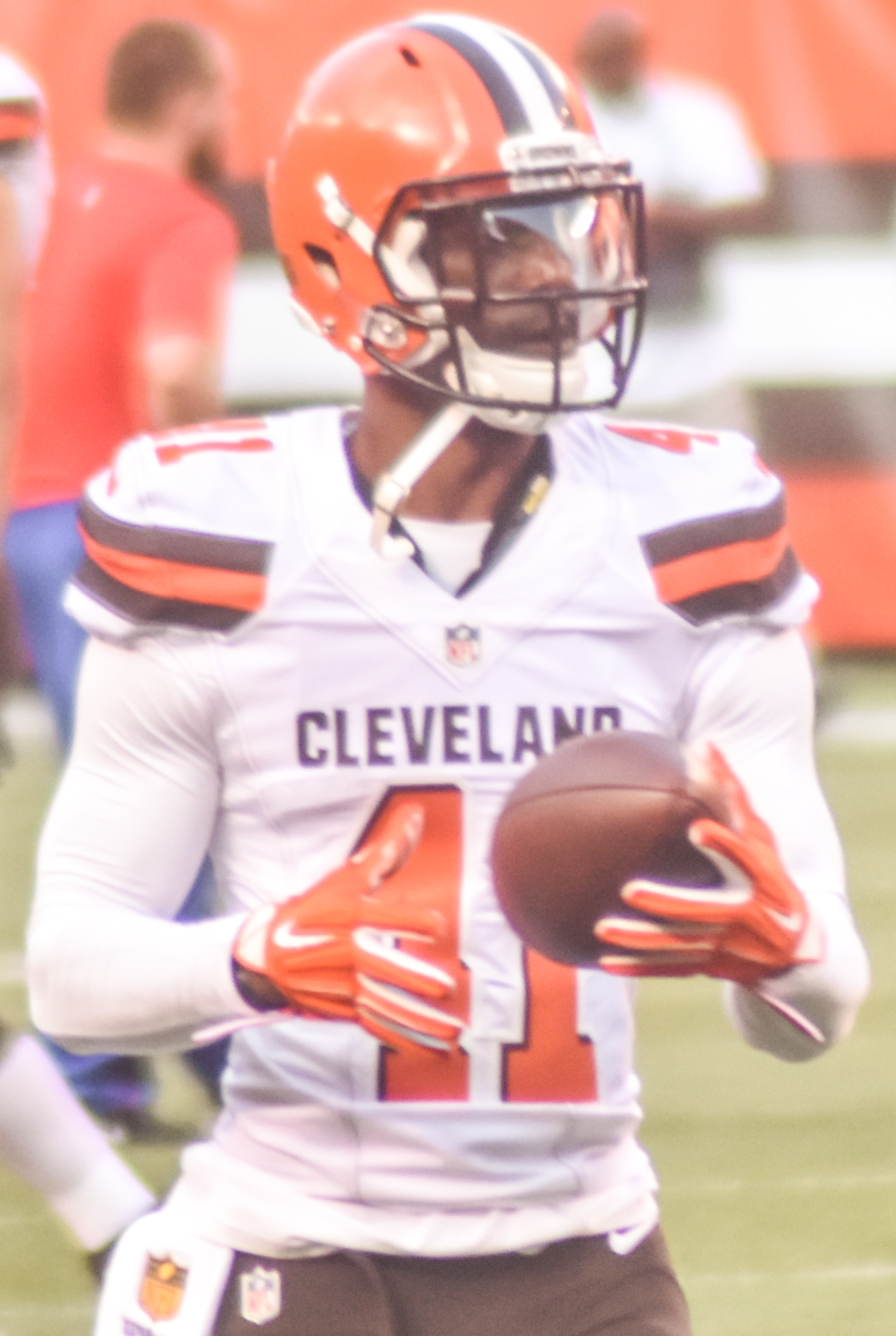
- Winston with the Cleveland Browns

No. 28, 41
- Position: Running back

Personal information
- Born: April 29, 1989 (age 37); Detroit, Michigan, U.S.
- Listed height: 6 ft 2 in (1.88 m)
- Listed weight: 220 lb (100 kg)

Career information
- High school: Denby Tech (Detroit)
- College: Northwood
- NFL draft: 2014: undrafted

Career history
- San Francisco 49ers (2014)*; Cleveland Browns (2014–2016)
- * Offseason or practice squad member only

Career NFL statistics
- Rushing attempts: 1
- Rushing yards: –8
- Total touchdowns: 0
- Stats at Pro Football Reference

Glenn Winston (born April 29, 1989) is an American former professional football player who was a running back in the National Football League (NFL). He played college football for the Michigan State Spartans and Northwood Timberwolves. He was signed by the San Francisco 49ers as an undrafted free agent in 2014 and has also played for the Cleveland Browns.

== College career ==
Winston attended Michigan State University for two years, before being dismissed from the team for violation of team rules. Winston had been involved in two on-campus altercations. The first occurred in October 2008, where he assaulted Michigan State hockey player A. J. Sturges, leaving him seriously injured and unable to play hockey for two years. The second occurred in December 2009 along with other teammates in a brawl at Michigan State's Rather Hall. He was later sentenced to six months in jail for the Sturges incident. In 2013, Winston enrolled at Northwood University. In his lone season at Northwood he rushed for 717 yards and nine touchdowns in eight games.

== Professional career ==
Winston was signed by the San Francisco 49ers after going undrafted in the 2014 NFL draft. He was released by the 49ers and claimed off waivers by the Cleveland Browns on August 31, 2014. He got his first NFL carry on December 13, 2015. On the play, San Francisco 49ers linebacker Ian Williams stripped the ball and reportedly gave Winston a concussion. It would be Winston's only NFL carry.
