= Carlos Brown (American football) =

American football player (born 1988)

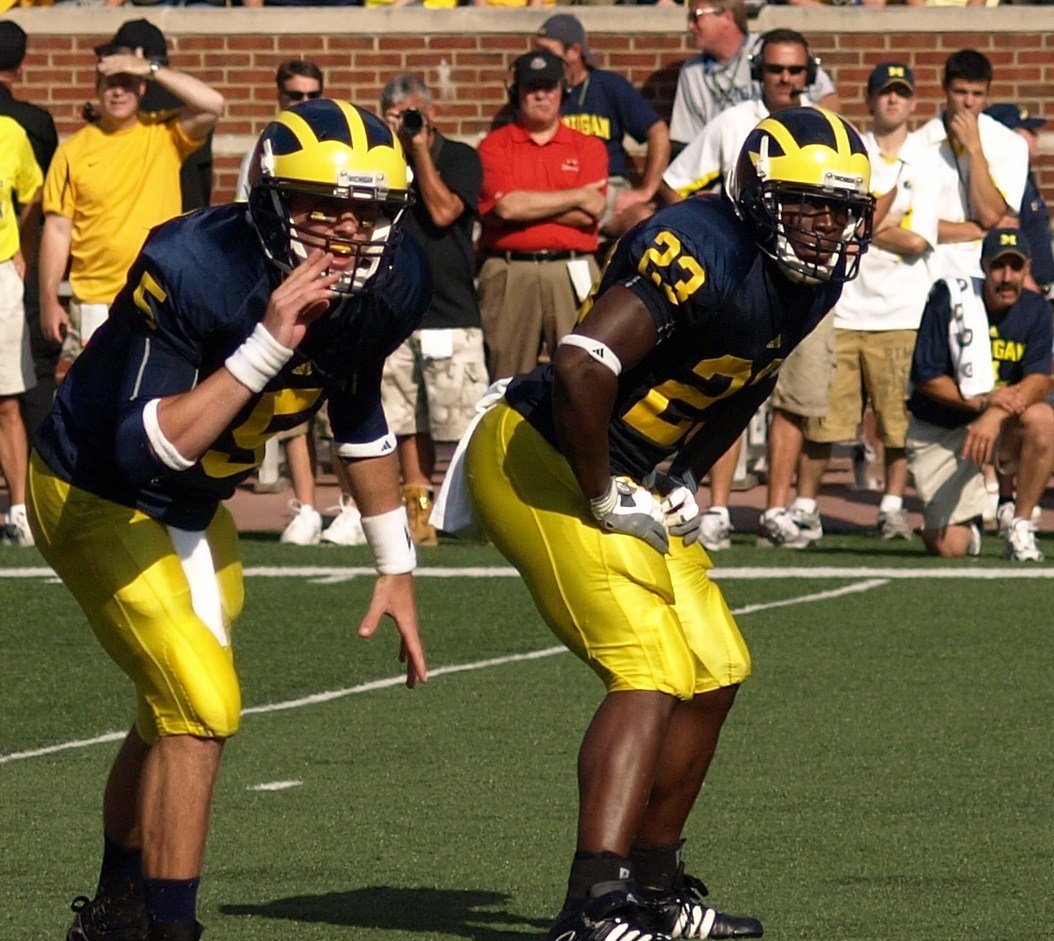
- Tate Forcier calling signals in the backfield with Brown during the 2009 Michigan–Notre Dame game.

No. 23
- Position: Running back

Personal information
- Born: April 28, 1988 (age 38); Franklin, Georgia, U.S.
- Listed height: 6 ft 0 in (1.83 m)
- Listed weight: 210 lb (95 kg)

Career information
- College: Michigan
- NFL draft: 2010: undrafted

Career history
- New Orleans Saints (2010)*; Tampa Bay Buccaneers (2010)*; New York Jets (2011)*
- * Offseason or practice squad member only

Carlos Antione Brown (born April 28, 1988) is an American former professional football player who was a running back in the National Football League (NFL). He played college football for the Michigan Wolverines and was signed by the New Orleans Saints as an undrafted free agent in 2010. He was also an off-season or practice squad member of the Tampa Bay Buccaneers and New York Jets.

== Early life ==
Brown was a highly recruited running back coming out of Heard County High School. During his high school career, Brown recorded 4,232 rushing yards on 469 carries, with 52 touchdowns. Brown also played defense (cornerback and free safety) in high school, and made 203 tackles, forced 11 fumbles, and intercepted 11 passes. High school awards include all-league and all-conference in his junior and senior years, and Parade Magazine named Brown an All-American. Brown was ranked as the 5th-best running back in the nation by Rivals.com, 10th-best by ESPN, and 24th-best by Scout.com. Rivals ranked his as the 39th best prospect in the nation and 2nd-best in the state of Georgia, while ESPN ranked him at number 59 in the nation.

College recruiting
Name	Hometown	School	Height	Weight	40^{‡}	Commit date
Carlos Brown; RB	Franklin, Georgia	Heard County (GA)	6 ft 0 in (1.83 m)	200 lb (91 kg)	4.51	Dec 19, 2005
Carlos Brown; RB	Recruit ratings: Scout: Rivals: (82)					
Overall recruit ranking: Scout: 24 (RB) Rivals: 39, 5 (RB), 2 (GA) ESPN: 59, 10 (RB)
Note: In many cases, Scout, Rivals, 247Sports, On3, and ESPN may conflict in their listings of height and weight.; In these cases, the average was taken. ESPN grades are on a 100-point scale.; Sources: "Michigan Football Commitments". Rivals.; "2006 Michigan Football Commits". Scout.; "ESPN". ESPN.; "Scout.com Team Recruiting Rankings". Scout.; "2006 Team Ranking". Rivals.com.

== College career ==
=== Freshman year ===
Brown played in 7 games as a freshman in 2006 and earned his first varsity letter. In limited action, Brown carried 16 times for 41 yards.

=== Sophomore year ===
Brown earned his second varsity letter as a sophomore in 2007, starting 3 games at tailback and appearing in 8 total games. He was the Wolverines' third-leading rusher that year, rushing for 382 yards and 4 touchdowns. He scored his first career touchdown against Purdue on October 13. A week later he recorded his first career 100-yard rushing game in his first career start against Illinois on October 20.

=== Junior year ===
Injuries plagued Carlos Brown's junior season. He earned his third varsity letter in 2008, but only played in 5 games. His only 100-yard effort came against Northwestern on November 15, carrying 23 times for 115 yards. He made his first and only start of the season in a loss to Ohio State, the final game of the worst season in Michigan football history.

=== Senior year ===
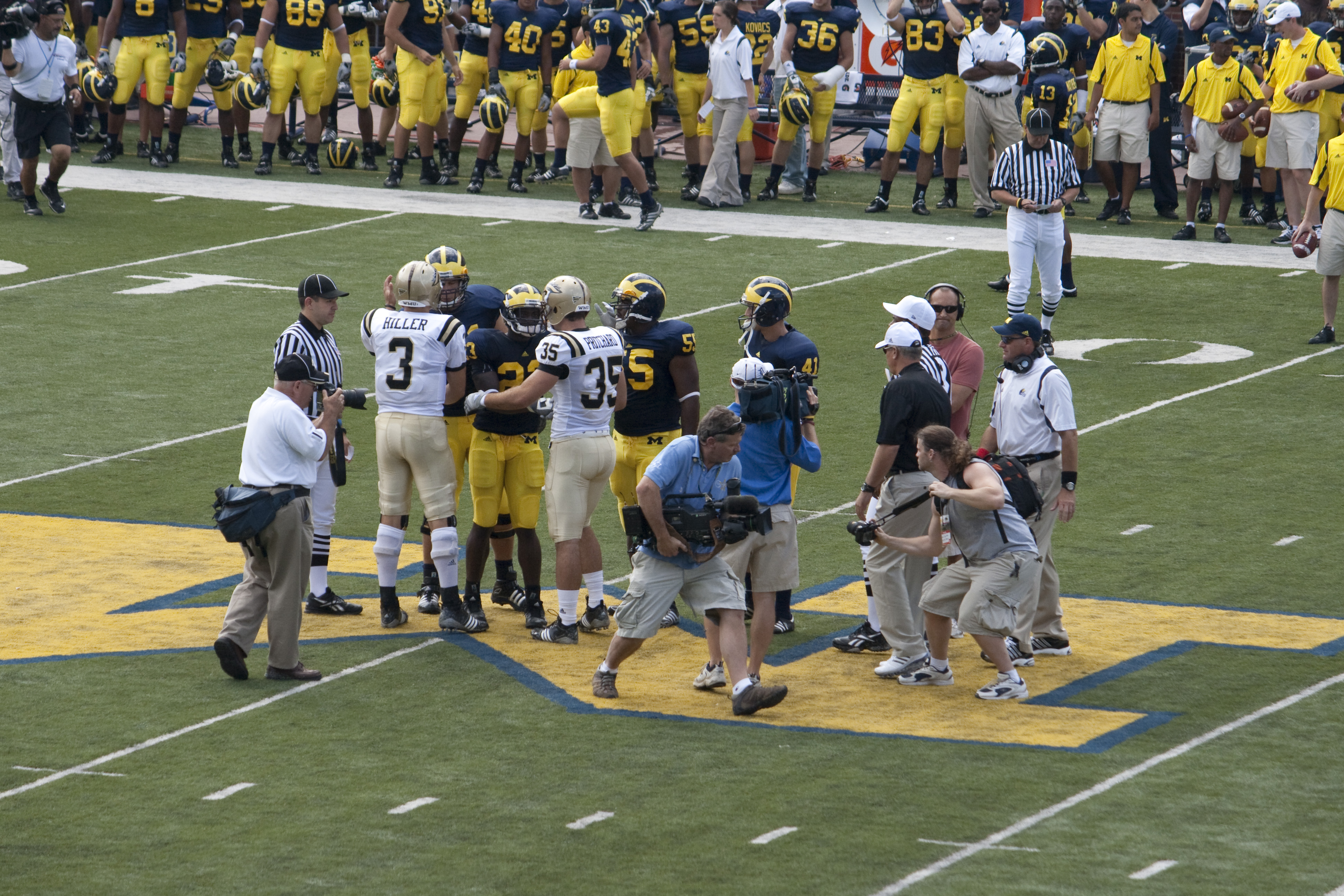
Brown during pregame coin toss with teammates Zoltan Mesko, Brandon Graham and Mark Ortmann as well as Tim Hiller.

On September 19, Brown set a career-high with 187 rushing yards against Eastern Michigan, including a 90-yard touchdown run. The 90-yard touchdown run was the third-longest play in Michigan history, and his efforts against Eastern Michigan earned Brown Big Ten Conference co-offensive player of the week honors along with Northwestern's Mike Kafka.

== Professional career ==
=== New Orleans Saints ===
Brown signed as an undrafted free agent with the New Orleans Saints on April 24, 2010, after going undrafted in the 2010 NFL draft. Brown was waived by the New Orleans Saints on May 24, 2010.

=== Tampa Bay Buccaneers ===
He was signed by the Tampa Bay Buccaneers on August 11, 2010 who released him on September 4.

=== New York Jets ===
The New York Jets signed Brown to a future contract on January 5, 2011. He was waived on August 2.
