= 2011 Michigan Wolverines football team =

American college football season

2011 Michigan Wolverines football

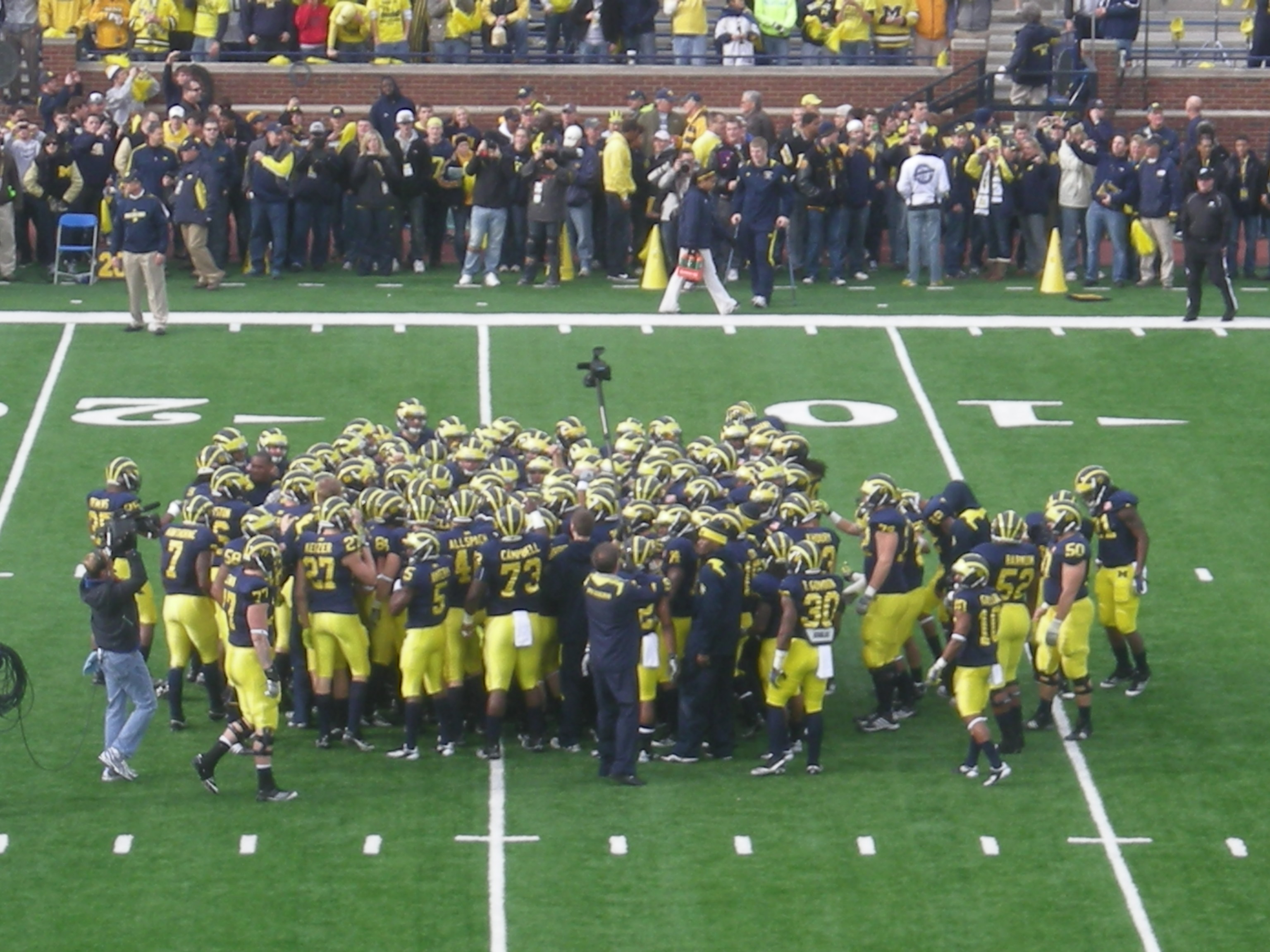

Sugar Bowl champion

Sugar Bowl, W 23–20 ^{OT} vs. Virginia Tech
- Conference: Big Ten Conference
- Legends Division

Ranking
- Coaches: No. 9
- AP: No. 12
- Record: 11–2 (6–2 Big Ten)
- Head coach: Brady Hoke (1st season)
- Offensive coordinator: Al Borges (1st season)
- Offensive scheme: Spread, pro-style
- Defensive coordinator: Greg Mattison (3rd season)
- Base defense: 4–3
- MVP: Denard Robinson
- Captains: Kevin Koger; Mike Martin; David Molk
- Home stadium: Michigan Stadium

2011 Big Ten Conference football standings
	Conf.			Overall
Team	W		L	W		L
Legends Division
No. 11 Michigan State x	7	–	1	11	–	3
No. 12 Michigan %	6	–	2	11	–	2
No. 24 Nebraska	5	–	3	9	–	4
Iowa	4	–	4	7	–	6
Northwestern	3	–	5	6	–	7
Minnesota	2	–	6	3	–	9
Leaders Division
No. 10 Wisconsin xy$	6	–	2	11	–	3
Penn State x	6	–	2	9	–	4
Purdue	4	–	4	7	–	6
Ohio State	3	–	5	6	–	7
Illinois	2	–	6	7	–	6
Indiana	0	–	8	1	–	11
Championship: Wisconsin 42, Michigan State 39
$ – BCS representative as conference champion; % – BCS at-large representative; x – Division champion/co-champions; y – Championship game participant; Rankings from AP Poll

The 2011 Michigan Wolverines football team, also known as Team 132 in reference to the 132nd year of the Michigan football program, represented the University of Michigan in the sport of college football during the 2011 NCAA Division I FBS football season.

Under first-year head coach Brady Hoke, Michigan compiled a record of 11–2 and finished in second place in the newly formed Legends Division of the Big Ten Conference. Hoke, hired in January 2011 following the firing of previous head coach Rich Rodriguez, was named Big Ten Coach of the Year by both the media and the coaches and was a finalist for national coach of the year honors. Highlights of Michigan's 2011 season included a 35–31 victory over Notre Dame in the first night game ever played at Michigan Stadium, a 45–17 victory over Nebraska in the Cornhuskers' first year in the Big Ten, and the first victory over arch-rival Ohio State since 2003. Michigan's season ended with a 23–20 overtime victory against Virginia Tech in the 2012 Sugar Bowl.

Under first-year defensive coordinator Greg Mattison, Michigan's defense went from being ranked 107th in scoring defense in 2010 (35.2 points per game) to being ranked sixth (17.38 points per game) in 2011. The team's leaders on defense included senior nose tackle Mike Martin, who started 29 consecutive games for Michigan, and safety Jordan Kovacs, who was a quarterfinalist for the Lott Trophy and a semifinalist for the Burlsworth Trophy. Mattison was selected as one of five finalists for the 2011 Broyles Award, awarded to the best assistant coach in college football.

On offense, Michigan had two players, Denard Robinson and Fitzgerald Toussaint, rush for 1,000 yards each for the first time since 1975. Robinson led the Big Ten in total offense per game for the second year in a row and also led the Wolverines in scoring with 96 points. Place-kicker Brendan Gibbons was the team's second leading scorer with 93 points having converted 13 of 17 field goal attempts and 54 of 55 extra points. Senior David Molk won the Rimington Trophy as the best center in college football and also became Michigan's first consensus All-American since 2007. Junior Hemingway was the team's leading receiver with 699 receiving yards and led the conference in yards per reception (20.6) for the second year in a row.

== Preseason ==
In 2010, Michigan became bowl eligible for the first time since 2007 and faced the Mississippi State Bulldogs in the Gator Bowl, which Michigan lost 52–14. The 2010 Wolverines finished the season ranked eighth nationally in total offense with quarterback Denard Robinson setting several individual records. However, the defensive unit finished 110th in total defense.

On January 4, 2011, after Michigan's loss in the Gator Bowl, and following a 15–22 record in three seasons under head coach Rich Rodriguez, athletic director Dave Brandon announced that Rodriguez had been fired and a national search was underway to select a new head coach. Brady Hoke was hired as Michigan's new head coach on January 11. Hoke's hiring triggered speculation that Denard Robinson would transfer, as it was believed that Hoke would run a pro-style offense with Michigan's new offensive coordinator Al Borges, but Robinson announced one day after Hoke's hiring that he would return to Michigan for the 2011 season. On defense, Michigan hired defensive coordinator Greg Mattison from the Baltimore Ravens. Mattison had previously been the defensive coordinator for Michigan's 1995 and 1996 teams. Following Hoke's hiring, the team was dubbed "Team 132" in recognition of the 132 seasons of Michigan football.

During the first eight months of 2011, seven Michigan players announced plans to transfer to other schools. The first to go was backup quarterback Tate Forcier who announced on January 22 that he was leaving the team, having previously been declared academically ineligible for the Gator Bowl. The other departures were (1) starting safety Ray Vinopal, who cited personal reasons for transferring to Pittsburgh, (2) cornerback Cullen Christian who also transferred to Pittsburgh, (3) wide receiver D.J. Williamson, (4) incoming offensive guard Tony Posada, (5) wide receiver Je'Ron Stokes who transferred to Bowling Green, and (6) incoming tight end Chris Barnett.

On August 7, 2011, Hoke announced that wide receiver Darryl Stonum (the team's second leading receiver in 2010) was suspended and would be redshirted due to drunken driving related violations. Additionally, due to an unspecified team rules violations, punter Will Hagerup (who had been suspended for one game in 2010) was suspended for the first four games, while wide receiver Terrence Robinson was suspended for the first game.

On August 28, 2011, the team named tight end Kevin Koger, defensive tackle Mike Martin, and center David Molk as its co-captains for the 2011 season. Michigan returned 17 of 22 starters from the 2010 team — ten on offense and seven on defense. In addition to Vinopal, Michigan was forced to replace starters offensive guard Stephen Schilling, linebacker Jonas Mouton, cornerback James Rogers, and defensive Greg Banks, as well as back-up linebacker Obi Ezeh, who was a former starter for the Wolverines. Other 2010 Wolverines in NFL training camps included Martell Webb and Perry Dorrestein. A total of 26 former Wolverine student-athletes were on opening day 53-man NFL active rosters.

Six Michigan players were listed on preseason watch lists: (1) Denard Robinson for the Walter Camp Award (best college player), Maxwell Award (best offensive player), and Davey O'Brien Award (best quarterback), Paul Hornung Award (most versatile player), and Manning Award (best quarterback), (2) Mike Martin for the Bednarik Trophy (best defensive player), Outland Trophy (best interior lineman), and Lombardi Award (best lineman), (3) David Molk for the Outland Trophy, Lombardi Award, and Rimington Trophy (best center), (4) Kevin Koger for the John Mackey Award (best tight end), (5) Roy Roundtree for the Fred Biletnikoff Award (best wide receiver), and (6) Ryan Van Bergen for the Ted Hendricks Award (best defensive end).

== Recruiting ==
=== Recruits ===
Michigan's recruiting class was ranked No. 27 by Scout and No. 21 by Rivals. It was not ranked by ESPN. The program received 20 letters of intent on National Signing Day, February 2, 2011.

College recruiting
Name	Hometown	School	Height	Weight	40^{‡}	Commit date
Chris Barnett; TE	Hurst, Texas	L.D. Bell H.S.	6 ft 6 in (1.98 m)	247 lb (112 kg)	4.535	Feb 2, 2011
Chris Barnett; TE	Recruit ratings: Scout: Rivals: (78)					
Russell Bellomy; QB	Arlington, Texas	Martin H.S.	6 ft 3 in (1.91 m)	181.5 lb (82.3 kg)	4.63	Jan 25, 2011
Russell Bellomy; QB	Recruit ratings: Scout: Rivals: (78)					
Brennen Beyer; DE	Canton, Michigan	Plymouth H.S.	6 ft 4 in (1.93 m)	220 lb (100 kg)	4.6	Apr 15, 2010
Brennen Beyer; DE	Recruit ratings: Scout: Rivals: (79)					
Greg Brown; DB	Fremont, Ohio	Fremont Ross H.S.	5 ft 10 in (1.78 m)	187.5 lb (85.0 kg)	4.4	Sep 2, 2009
Greg Brown; DB	Recruit ratings: Scout: Rivals: (77)					
Chris Bryant; OT	Chicago, Illinois	Simeon Career Academy	6 ft 5 in (1.96 m)	330 lb (150 kg)	5.3	Jan 28, 2011
Chris Bryant; OT	Recruit ratings: Scout: Rivals: (77)					
Tamani Carter; CB	Pickerington, Ohio	Pickerington H.S. Central	5 ft 11.5 in (1.82 m)	175 lb (79 kg)	4.48	Jan 19, 2011
Tamani Carter; CB	Recruit ratings: Scout: Rivals: (74)					
Frank Clark; DE/LB/TE	Cleveland, Ohio	Glenville H.S.	6 ft 3 in (1.91 m)	210 lb (95 kg)	4.53	Feb 2, 2011
Frank Clark; DE/LB/TE	Recruit ratings: Scout: Rivals: (77)					
Blake Countess; DB	Olney, Maryland	Our Lady of Good Counsel H.S.	5 ft 10 in (1.78 m)	172.5 lb (78.2 kg)	4.475	Dec 17, 2010
Blake Countess; DB	Recruit ratings: Scout: Rivals: (80)					
Justice Hayes; RB	Grand Blanc, Michigan	Grand Blanc H.S.	5 ft 10 in (1.78 m)	178.5 lb (81.0 kg)	4.425	Nov 22, 2010
Justice Hayes; RB	Recruit ratings: Scout: Rivals: (79)					
Keith Heitzman; DE/TE	Columbus, Ohio	Hilliard Davidson H.S.	6 ft 3 in (1.91 m)	229.5 lb (104.1 kg)	4.9	Jan 21, 2011
Keith Heitzman; DE/TE	Recruit ratings: Scout: Rivals: (75)					
Delonte Hollowell; DB	Detroit, Michigan	Cass Tech H.S.	5 ft 8 in (1.73 m)	163 lb (74 kg)	4.615	Jan 17, 2010
Delonte Hollowell; DB	Recruit ratings: Scout: Rivals: (79)					
Kellen Jones; LB	Houston, Texas	St. Pius X H.S.	6 ft 1 in (1.85 m)	209.5 lb (95.0 kg)	4.65	Jul 29, 2010
Kellen Jones; LB	Recruit ratings: Scout: Rivals: (79)					
Jack Miller; C	Perrysburg, Ohio	St. John's Jesuit H.S.	6 ft 4.25 in (1.94 m)	266.5 lb (120.9 kg)	4.8	Jun 29, 2010
Jack Miller; C	Recruit ratings: Scout: Rivals: (78)					
Desmond Morgan; LB	Holland, Michigan	West Ottawa H.S.	6 ft 1 in (1.85 m)	225 lb (102 kg)	4.675	Dec 13, 2010
Desmond Morgan; LB	Recruit ratings: Scout: Rivals: (78)					
Antonio Poole; LB	Cincinnati, Ohio	Winton Woods H.S.	6 ft 1.5 in (1.87 m)	217.5 lb (98.7 kg)	–	Jan 25, 2011
Antonio Poole; LB	Recruit ratings: Scout: Rivals: (78)					
Tony Posada; OT	Tampa, Florida	Plant H.S.	6 ft 5.5 in (1.97 m)	320 lb (150 kg)	5.4	Aug 11, 2010
Tony Posada; OT	Recruit ratings: Scout: Rivals: (78)					
Thomas Rawls; RB	Flint, Michigan	Flint Northern H.S.	5 ft 10 in (1.78 m)	215 lb (98 kg)	4.5	Feb 1, 2011
Thomas Rawls; RB	Recruit ratings: Scout: Rivals: (76)					
Chris Rock; DE	Columbus, Ohio	Desales H.S.	6 ft 5 in (1.96 m)	245 lb (111 kg)	4.9	May 28, 2010
Chris Rock; DE	Recruit ratings: Scout: Rivals: (78)					
Raymon Taylor; CB/ATH	Highland Park, Michigan	Highland Park Community H.S.	5 ft 10.5 in (1.79 m)	171 lb (78 kg)	4.43	Jan 22, 2011
Raymon Taylor; CB/ATH	Recruit ratings: Scout: Rivals: (77)					
Matt Wile; K	San Diego, California	Francis W. Parker School	6 ft 2 in (1.88 m)	210 lb (95 kg)	–	Jan 22, 2011
Matt Wile; K	Recruit ratings: Scout: Rivals: (74)					
Overall recruit ranking: Scout: 27 Rivals: 21
‡ Refers to 40-yard dash; Note: In many cases, Scout, Rivals, 247Sports, On3, and ESPN may conflict in their listings of height, weight and 40 time.; In these cases, the average was taken. ESPN grades are on a 100-point scale.; Sources: "Michigan Football Commitments". Rivals.; "2011 Michigan Football Commits". Scout.; "ESPN". ESPN.; "Scout.com Team Recruiting Rankings". Scout.; "2011 Team Ranking". Rivals.com.

== Schedule ==
Date	Time	Opponent	Rank	Site	TV	Result	Attendance	Source
September 3	3:30 p.m.	Western Michigan*		Michigan Stadium; Ann Arbor, MI	ABC, ESPN2	W 34–10	110,506	
September 10	8:00 p.m.	Notre Dame*		Michigan Stadium; Ann Arbor, MI (rivalry, College GameDay)	ESPN	W 35–31	114,804	
September 17	12:00 p.m.	Eastern Michigan*		Michigan Stadium; Ann Arbor, MI	BTN	W 31–3	110,343	
September 24	12:00 p.m.	San Diego State*	No. 22	Michigan Stadium; Ann Arbor, MI	BTN	W 28–7	110,707	
October 1	12:00 p.m.	Minnesota	No. 19	Michigan Stadium; Ann Arbor, MI (Little Brown Jug)	BTN	W 58–0	111,106	
October 8	7:00 p.m.	at Northwestern	No. 12	Ryan Field; Evanston, IL (rivalry)	BTN	W 42–24	47,330	
October 15	12:00 p.m.	at No. 23 Michigan State	No. 11	Spartan Stadium; East Lansing, MI (rivalry)	ESPN	L 14–28	77,515	
October 29	12:00 p.m.	Purdue^{†}	No. 17	Michigan Stadium; Ann Arbor, MI	ESPN2	W 36–14	112,115	
November 5	12:00 p.m.	at Iowa	No. 13	Kinnick Stadium; Iowa City, IA	ESPN	L 16–24	70,585	
November 12	3:30 p.m.	at Illinois	No. 22	Memorial Stadium; Champaign, IL (rivalry)	ABC/ESPN	W 31–14	60,670	
November 19	12:00 p.m.	No. 16 Nebraska	No. 20	Michigan Stadium; Ann Arbor, MI	ESPN	W 45–17	113,718	
November 26	12:00 p.m.	Ohio State	No. 17	Michigan Stadium; Ann Arbor, MI (The Game)	ABC	W 40–34	114,132	
January 3, 2012	8:30 p.m.	vs. No. 11 Virginia Tech*	No. 13	Mercedes-Benz Superdome; New Orleans, LA (Sugar Bowl, College GameDay)	ESPN	W 23–20 ^{OT}	64,512	
*Non-conference game; ^{†}Homecoming; Rankings from AP Poll released prior to the game; All times are in Eastern time

== Rankings ==
Michigan began the season unranked in the Top 25 of both the AP Poll and the Coaches' Poll, but by midseason had risen to #10 in the Coaches' Poll and #11 in the AP Poll. After its loss to Michigan State, Michigan fell to #17 in the Coaches' Poll and #18 in the AP Poll. Michigan rose to #13 in the AP and Coaches' Polls and #15 in the BCS Poll before its game against Iowa, falling after the loss to #22 in the AP Poll, #21 in the Coaches' Poll, and #24 in the BCS Poll. Michigan finished the regular season ranked #12 in the Coaches' Poll, and #13 in the AP and BCS Polls. Following its win over Virginia Tech in the Sugar Bowl, Michigan ended the season ranked #9 in the Coaches' Poll and #12 in the AP Poll.

Ranking movements Legend: ██ Increase in ranking ██ Decrease in ranking RV = Received votes
	Week															
Poll	Pre	1	2	3	4	5	6	7	8	9	10	11	12	13	14	Final
AP	RV	RV	RV	22	19	12	11	18	17	13	22	20	17	17	13	12
Coaches	RV	RV	RV	21	19	11	10	17	17	13	21	18	16	16	12	9
Harris	Not released						10	17	16	13	21	18	16	16	12	Not released
BCS	Not released							18	18	15	24	18	15	16	13	Not released

*Source: ESPN.com: 2011 NCAA Football Rankings

== Game summaries ==
=== Vs. Western Michigan ===
Western Michigan at Michigan

Team	1	2	3	4	Total
Broncos	7	3	0	0	10
• Wolverines	0	20	14	0	34

- Date: September 3
- Location: Michigan Stadium
  Ann Arbor, Michigan
- Game start: 3:30 p.m. EST
- Elapsed time: 3:35
- Game attendance: 110,506
- Game weather: 87 °F (31 °C), Rain/Thunderstorms, W 7 mph (11 km/h)
- Referee: Todd Geerlings
- TV announcers (ABC/ESPN2): Mike Patrick, Craig James & Jeannine Edwards

Scoring summary
1	7:49	WMU	Antoin Scriven 1-yard run (John Potter kick)	WMU 7–0
2	14:16	MICH	Fitzgerald Toussaint 1-yard run (Brendan Gibbons kick)	Tied 7–7
2	6:58	MICH	Brandon Herron 94-yard interception return (Brendan Gibbons kick)	MICH 14–7
2	1:49	MICH	Fitzgerald Toussaint 2-yard run (kick blocked)	MICH 20–7
2	0:43	WMU	John Potter 36-yard field goal	MICH 20–10
3	9:27	MICH	Brandon Herron 29-yard fumble return (Brendan Gibbons kick)	MICH 27–10
3	6:01	MICH	Michael Shaw 44-yard run (Brendan Gibbons kick)	MICH 34–10

In the opening game of the season, Michigan hosted the Western Michigan Broncos. When the teams last met in 2009, the Wolverines won 31–7.

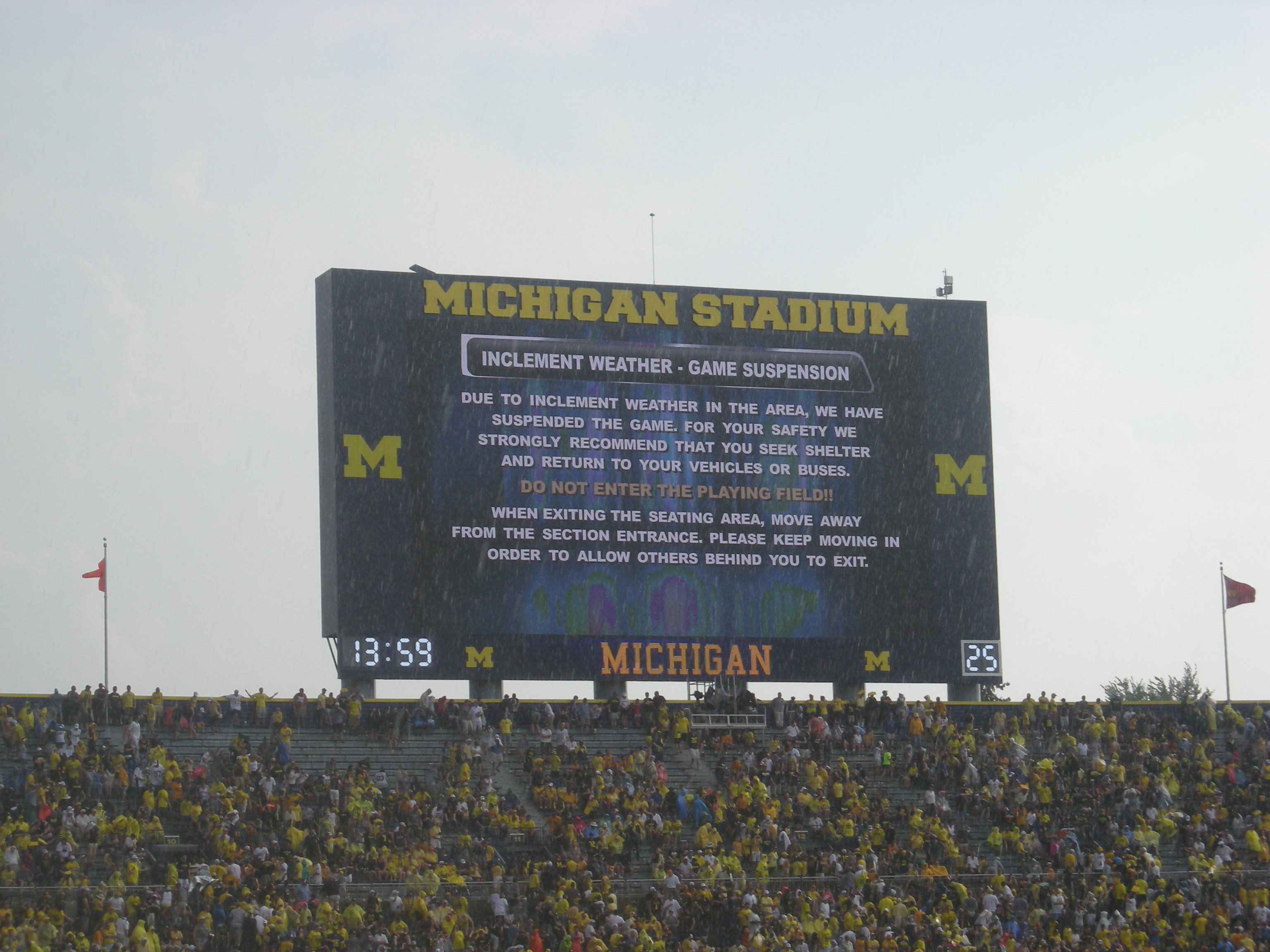
One of Michigan Stadium's scoreboards indicating the first of two weather delays.

In a game shortened by lightning, Michigan defeated Western Michigan 34–10. Western Michigan scored the only points of the first quarter with a one-yard touchdown run by Antoin Scriven. Michigan answered with three consecutive touchdowns in the second quarter: a one-yard run by Fitzgerald Toussaint, a 94-yard interception return by Brandon Herron (the longest interception return for a touchdown in Michigan program history), and a two-yard touchdown run by Toussaint. Following Michigan's third touchdown, the extra point attempt was blocked. The Broncos scored their final points of the game on a 36-yard field goal by John Potter just before halftime. In the third quarter, Herron returned a fumble 29 yards for a touchdown, and Michael Shaw scored on a 44-yard touchdown run (the longest touchdown run of his career). After two rain delays in the third quarter, the game was stopped due to lightning in the area and Michigan was awarded the win. The temperature on the field at kickoff was over 137 °F (58 °C), and by the end of the game it had dropped to 84 °F (29 °C), a difference of 53 °F (12 °C). This was the first Michigan football game to be ended due to weather before all 60 minutes were played and the second game in Michigan Stadium history that featured a weather delay (the first coming in a 2006 game against Central Michigan).

Jordan Kovacs and Brandon Herron led the defense. Kovacks forced the fumble that was returned for a touchdown, had two quarterback sacks and ten tackles, and was named the Lott Trophy's IMPACT Player of the Week. Herron became the first Michigan player to post two defensive touchdowns and the first since Tom Harmon to have two return touchdowns of any kind in a game. In recognition of his efforts, Herron was named Big Ten Defensive Player of the Week, Walter Camp National Defensive Player of the Week, National Defensive Performer of Week 1 and National Linebacker Performer of the Week by College Football Performance Awards (CFPA), and Big Ten Defensive Player of the Week by College Sports Madness. He was also nominated for Defensive Performance of the Year by Intersport.

The NCAA originally determined that it would not count player and team statistics for the game, because three quarters had not been completed. At the end of November 2011, the NCAA reversed the decision and determined that statistics from the game would be counted.

=== Vs. Notre Dame ===
Notre Dame at Michigan

Team	1	2	3	4	Total
Notre Dame	14	3	7	7	31
• Michigan	0	7	0	28	35

- Date: September 10
- Location: Michigan Stadium
  Ann Arbor, Michigan
- Game start: 8:00 p.m. EST
- Elapsed time: 3:30
- Game attendance: 114,804
- Game weather: 67 °F (19 °C), ESE 4 mph (6.4 km/h)
- Referee: Tom Tomczyk
- TV announcers (ESPN): Brent Musburger, Kirk Herbstreit & Erin Andrews

Scoring summary
1	9:05	ND	Theo Riddick 7-yard pass from Tommy Rees (David Ruffer kick)	ND 7–0
1	1:56	ND	Cierre Wood 4-yard run (David Ruffer kick)	ND 14–0
2	10:18	MICH	Junior Hemingway 43-yard pass from Denard Robinson (Brendan Gibbons kick)	ND 14–7
2	1:40	ND	David Ruffer 38-yard field goal	ND 17–7
3	2:13	ND	TJ Jones 15-yard pass from Tommy Rees (David Ruffer kick)	ND 24–7
4	14:54	MICH	Denard Robinson 1-yard run (Brendan Gibbons kick)	ND 24–14
4	10:47	MICH	Jeremy Gallon 14-yard pass from Denard Robinson (Brendan Gibbons kick)	ND 24–21
4	1:12	MICH	Vincent Smith 21-yard pass from Denard Robinson (Brendan Gibbons kick)	MICH 28–24
4	0:30	ND	Theo Riddick 29-yard pass from Tommy Rees (David Ruffer kick)	ND 31–28
4	0:02	MICH	Roy Roundtree 16-yard pass from Denard Robinson (Brendan Gibbons kick)	MICH 35–31

Following its opener against Western Michigan, Michigan renewed its rivalry with the Notre Dame Fighting Irish. In the first night game in Michigan Stadium history, both teams wore "throwback-style" jerseys. Michigan's jerseys did not entirely match any worn in team history; however, they incorporated "design elements from different eras of Michigan football." During the previous meeting, Denard Robinson set a school record for total yardage in a single game at 502 yards, as Michigan defeated Notre Dame 28–24 in a wild affair. Due to the significance of the game, ESPN announced on August 5 that College GameDay would be held in Ann Arbor for the first time since November 17, 2007, when Michigan hosted Ohio State, which was Michigan head coach Lloyd Carr's final regular season game before he retired. At the game, 1991 Heisman Trophy winner Desmond Howard was honored in recognition of his recent induction into the College Football Hall of Fame. A 1991 consensus All-American, Howard became the first receiver in history to lead the Big Ten Conference in scoring, and he set or tied five NCAA records and 12 single-season Michigan records during his senior year. Charles Woodson was also honored. A C-47 conducted the pre-game flyover and two parachuters from the 101st Airborne Division entered the stadium at halftime.

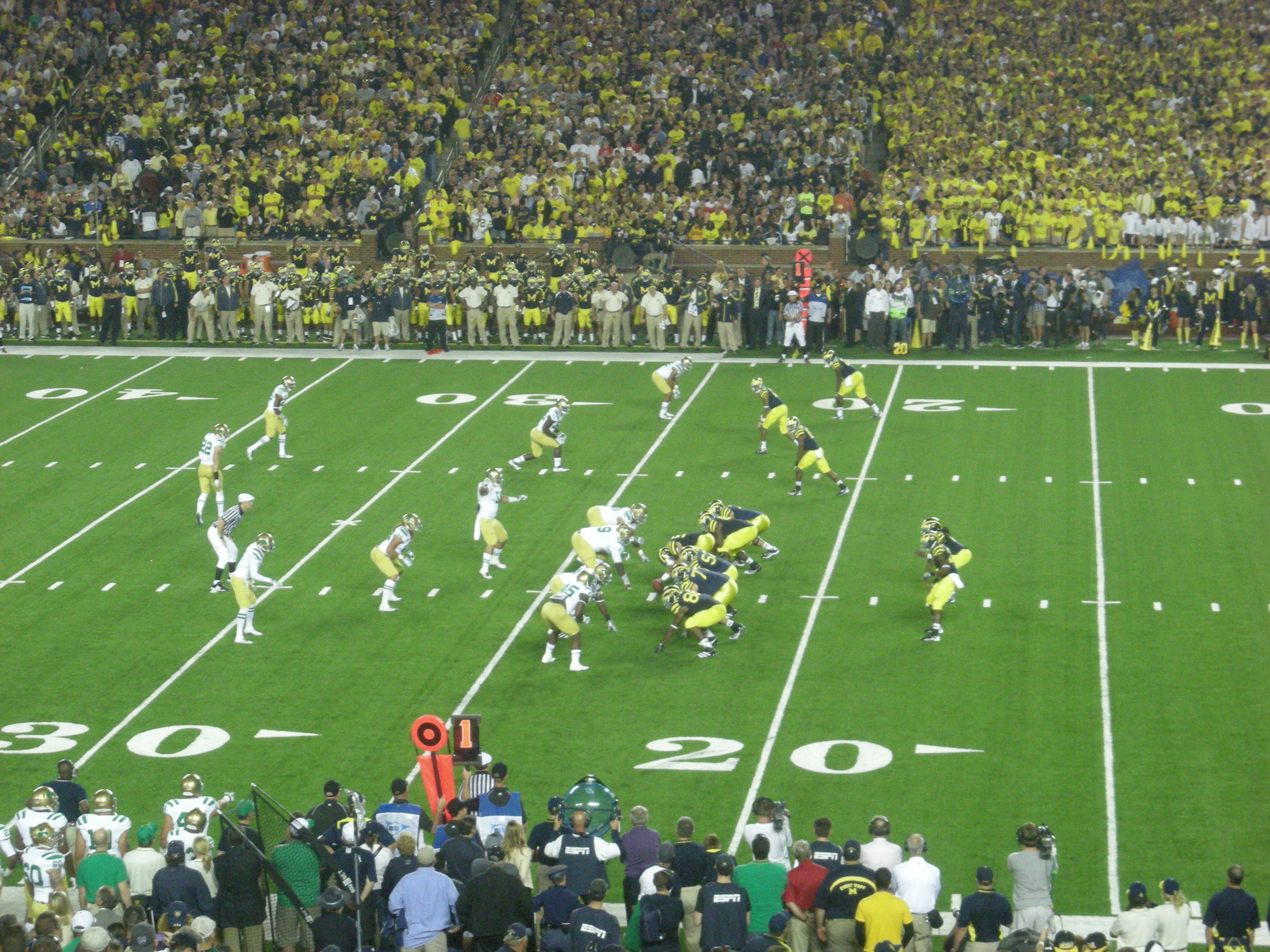
Michigan on offense against Notre Dame.

Michigan came back from a 17-point deficit to defeat Notre Dame 35–31, scoring the winning touchdown with two seconds remaining. Notre Dame started the scoring with two consecutive touchdowns in the first quarter, with the first coming from a seven-yard catch by Theo Riddick, and the second from a four-yard run by Cierre Wood. Michigan's only points of the first half came on a 43-yard reception by Junior Hemingway in the second quarter. Notre Dame answered with a 38-yard field goal by David Ruffer just before halftime to extend its lead to ten points. The score at halftime was 17–7 in favor of Notre Dame. The only points of the third quarter were when Notre Dame's T. J. Jones caught a 15-yard touchdown pass. In the fourth quarter Michigan rallied from behind, scoring three consecutive touchdowns: first a one-yard run by Denard Robinson after Stephen Hopkins fumbled at the goal line, then a 47-yard catch by Jeremy Gallon, then a 21-yard catch by Vincent Smith to give them their first lead of the game. Notre Dame responded almost immediately, as Theo Riddick scored his second touchdown of the game less than a minute later on a 29-yard catch. Michigan received the ball on its 20-yard line with 30 seconds remaining, and drove 80 yards in 28 seconds with Roy Roundtree scoring the game-winning touchdown with two seconds left in the game.

Michigan's 17-point comeback against Notre Dame tied for the third-biggest comeback in Michigan history and tied for the second-biggest comeback at Michigan Stadium. The game's announced crowd of 114,804 set the all-time attendance record for a football game—college or NFL—and broke the Michigan Stadium attendance record. The previous Michigan Stadium record was 113,411 spectators, established at the 2010 "Big Chill at the Big House" ice hockey game. In recognition of his performance during the game, the Big Ten named Denard Robinson its Offensive Player of the Week, while the Davey O'Brien Award named him its Quarterback of the Week. He was also named Rivals.com's Big Ten and National Player of the Week and won the Capital One Cup Impact Performance of the Week. The team was recognized as the Tostitos Fiesta Bowl National Team of Week.

=== Vs. Eastern Michigan ===
Eastern Michigan at Michigan

Team	1	2	3	4	Total
Eagles	0	3	0	0	3
• Wolverines	0	14	14	3	31

- Date: September 17
- Location: Michigan Stadium
  Ann Arbor, Michigan
- Game start: 12:00 p.m. EST
- Elapsed time: 2:56
- Game attendance: 110,304
- Game weather: 55 °F (13 °C), Cloudy, NE 10 mph (16 km/h)
- Referee: Mike Conlin
- TV announcers (BTN): Tom Hart, Derek Rackley & Lisa Byington

Scoring summary
2	14:55	EMU	Kody Fulkerson 21-yard field goal	EMU 3–0
2	9:28	MICH	Kevin Koger 9-yard pass from Denard Robinson (Brendan Gibbons kick)	MICH 7–3
2	0:39	MICH	Denard Robinson 11-yard run (Brendan Gibbons kick)	MICH 14–3
3	9:17	MICH	Fitzgerald Toussaint 1-yard run (Brendan Gibbons kick)	MICH 21–3
3	1:05	MICH	Drew Dileo 19 yard pass from Denard Robinson (Brendan Gibbons kick)	MICH 28–3
4	4:32	MICH	Brendan Gibbons 21-yard field goal	MICH 31–3

In the third week of the season, Michigan hosted the Eastern Michigan Eagles. Michigan won the previous meeting between the two schools in 2009 by a 45–17 score.

Michigan defeated Eastern Michigan 31–3. In the first quarter, Eastern Michigan sustained five drives into Michigan territory, but their drives stalled on a fumble, an interception, and a stop by the Michigan defense on fourth down from the one-yard line. On the first play of the second quarter, the Eagles took a 3–0 lead on a 21-yard field goal by Kody Fulkerson. Michigan did not score until the 9:28 mark in the second quarter with a nine-yard touchdown pass from Denard Robinson to Kevin Koger. The Wolverines added to the lead later in the second quarter on an 11-yard touchdown run by Robinson giving Michigan a 14–3 lead at halftime. In the third quarter, Michigan added two more touchdowns on a one-yard touchdown run by Fitzgerald Toussaint and a 19-yard touchdown catch by Drew Dileo. The final points of the game came on a 21-yard field goal by Brendan Gibbons in the fourth quarter.

In holding Eastern Michigan to three points, Michigan put in its best performance in scoring defense since a 38–0 shutout of Notre Dame on September 15, 2007. The defense also held the Eagles to 29 passing yards – the lowest total for a Michigan opponent since Rice recorded 15 passing yards in 1999. Denard Robinson rushed for 198 yards. Robinson's 52-yard run early in the second quarter was his longest to that point of the season, later eclipsed by a 53-yard run against San Diego State. After Robinson completed seven of 18 passes with an interception, the Associated Press called it "another lackluster passing performance." Vincent Smith also contributed 118 rushing yards rushing on nine carries. The Wolverines improved to 10–0 in the all-time series against Eastern Michigan.

=== Vs. San Diego State ===
San Diego State at Michigan

Team	1	2	3	4	Total
Aztecs	0	0	7	0	7
• #22 Wolverines	14	7	0	7	28

- Date: September 24
- Location: Michigan Stadium
  Ann Arbor, Michigan
- Game start: 12:00 p.m. EST
- Elapsed time: 3:08
- Game attendance: 110,707
- Game weather: 62 °F (17 °C), Cloudy, S 7 mph (11 km/h)
- Referee: Dave Witvoet
- TV announcers (BTN): Eric Collins, Chris Martin & Dionne Miller

Scoring summary
1	10:08	MICH	Denard Robinson 5-yard run (Brendan Gibbons kick)	MICH 7–0
1	6:22	MICH	Denard Robinson 53-yard run (Brendan Gibbons kick)	MICH 14–0
2	0:31	MICH	Denard Robinson 1-yard run (Brendan Gibbons kick)	MICH 21–0
3	0:04	SDSU	Colin Lockett 16-yard pass from Ryan Lindley (Abelardo Perez kick)	MICH 21–7
4	6:29	MICH	Vincent Smith 7-yard run (Brendan Gibbons kick)	MICH 28–7

In its final game of non-conference play, Michigan hosted the San Diego State Aztecs. This meeting was the first between the two schools since 2004, and came nine months after Brady Hoke left San Diego State for Michigan. During the previous meeting, Michigan escaped a potential upset by San Diego State, winning 24–21.

Michigan defeated San Diego State 28–7. Denard Robinson scored all three touchdowns in the first half: a five-yard run and then a 53-yard run in the first quarter, and then in the second quarter on a one-yard run. In the third quarter, San Diego State scored its only points of the game with a 16-yard catch by Colin Lockett following a fumble by Michigan's Stephen Hopkins. In the fourth quarter, Michigan sealed its victory with a seven-yard touchdown run by Vincent Smith.

Robinson carried the ball 21 times for 200 yards and three touchdowns and also passed for 93 yards. It was Robinson's third career 200-yard rushing game and matched his career best for rushing touchdowns. Robinson became one of only three Wolverines players to register three or more 200-yard rushing games in program history. Mike Hart (2004–07) holds the record with five, while Ron Johnson (1966–68) also has three. Robinson passed Illinois' Isiah Williams to move into the second spot among the Big Ten Conference's career leaders in rushing yards by a quarterback. Robinson earned Big Ten Conference Co-Offensive Player of the Week recognition.

=== Vs. Minnesota ===
Minnesota at Michigan
(Little Brown Jug)

Team	1	2	3	4	Total
Golden Gophers	0	0	0	0	0
• #19 Wolverines	14	24	10	10	58

- Date: October 1
- Location: Michigan Stadium
  Ann Arbor, Michigan
- Game start: 12:00 p.m. EST
- Elapsed time: 3:15
- Game attendance: 111,106
- Game weather: 52 °F (11 °C), Partly Sunny, N 25 mph (40 km/h)
- Referee: Dennis Lipski
- TV announcers (BTN): Eric Collins, Chris Martin & Dionne Miller

Scoring summary
1	11:25	MICH	Vincent Smith 3-yard run (Brendan Gibbons kick)	MICH 7–0
1	6:00	MICH	Denard Robinson 6-yard run (Brendan Gibbons kick)	MICH 14–0
2	14:52	MICH	Drew Dileo 17-yard pass from Vincent Smith (Brendan Gibbons kick)	MICH 21–0
2	9:38	MICH	Vincent Smith 28-yard pass from Denard Robinson (Brendan Gibbons kick)	MICH 28–0
2	5:07	MICH	Brendan Gibbons 25-yard field goal	MICH 31–0
2	0:45	MICH	Kevin Koger 18-yard pass from Denard Robinson (Brendan Gibbons kick)	MICH 38–0
3	8:18	MICH	Fitzgerald Toussaint 1-yard run (Brendan Gibbons kick)	MICH 45–0
3	2:04	MICH	Brendan Gibbons 32-yard field goal	MICH 48–0
4	9:17	MICH	Brendan Gibbons 38-yard field goal	MICH 51–0
4	4:58	MICH	Courtney Avery 83-yard fumble return (Brendan Gibbons kick)	MICH 58–0

In its first game of the Big Ten season, Michigan hosted the Minnesota Golden Gophers for the Little Brown Jug. Michigan won the previous meeting between the two schools in 2008 29–6.

Michigan dominated in all aspects of the game and defeated Minnesota 58–0. In the first quarter Vincent Smith ran in a three-yard touchdown, which was followed by a Denard Robinson nine-yard touchdown run. In the second quarter Drew Dileo caught a 17-yard pass from Vincent Smith, which was followed by a Vincent Smith 28-yard touchdown reception, his second touchdown of the game. Michigan's next scoring play came on a 25-yard field goal by Brendan Gibbons. Just before halftime, Kevin Koger caught an 18-yard pass for a touchdown. After the break, Fitzgerald Touissant rushed for a one-yard touchdown. Next came two more field goals from Gibbons: first from 32 yards, then in the fourth quarter from 38 yards. Michigan scored its final points when Courtney Avery picked up a Minnesota fumble and ran it back 83 yards for a touchdown.

The game was Michigan's first shutout of a Big Ten opponent since a 20–0 win at Penn State on October 6, 2001, and its first shutout of any opponent since a 38–0 win against Notre Dame on September 15, 2007. The 58–0 win over the Golden Gophers was Michigan's largest margin of victory over Minnesota in the series' history. The previous best was 51 (58–7) in 1993. The game also marked Michigan's largest margin of victory over any opponent since a 69–0 victory over Northwestern in October 1975. (Michigan also defeated Indiana by an identical 58–0 score in October 2000.) Vincent Smith became the first running back in FBS to pass for a touchdown and have touchdowns rushing and receiving since C. J. Spiller on November 14, 2009, against North Carolina State. He is the fifth Big Ten player to do so since 1996 and the first since Mike Kafka, who accomplished the feat for Northwestern on September 19, 2009. Michigan outgained Minnesota 580 to 177. Minnesota's total yardage was the lowest allowed by Michigan since the game against Minnesota in 2008. Michigan rushed for 363 yards of offense, its third straight game of rushing for more than 300 yards. This is the first time this has occurred since the 1987 season.

=== At Northwestern ===
Michigan at Northwestern

Team	1	2	3	4	Total
• #12 Wolverines	7	7	14	14	42
Wildcats	14	10	0	0	24

- Date: October 8
- Location: Ryan Field
  Evanston, Illinois
- Game start: 7:00 p.m. EST
- Elapsed time: 3:16
- Game attendance: 47,330
- Game weather: 72 °F (22 °C), Clear, E 3 mph (4.8 km/h)
- Referee: Scott McElwee
- TV announcers (BTN): Tom Hart, Derek Rackley & Lisa Byington

Scoring summary
1	10:55	MICH	Steve Watson 9-yard pass from Denard Robinson (Brendan Gibbons kick)	MICH 7–0
1	8:50	NW	Kain Colter 15-yard run (Jeff Budzien kick)	Tied 7–7
1	4:10	NW	Treyvon Green 7-yard run (Jeff Budzien kick)	NW 14–7
2	4:13	MICH	Jeremy Gallon 25-yard pass from Denard Robinson (Brendan Gibbons kick)	Tied 14–14
2	2:21	NW	Adonis Smith 2-yard run (Jeff Budzien kick)	NW 21–14
2	0:00	NW	Jeff Budzien 20-yard field goal	NW 24–14
3	10:52	MICH	Denard Robinson 2-yard run (Brendan Gibbons kick)	NW 24–21
3	2:58	MICH	Devin Gardner 1-yard run (Brendan Gibbons kick)	MICH 28–24
4	14:55	MICH	Michael Shaw 2-yard run (Brendan Gibbons kick)	MICH 35–24
4	2:19	MICH	Denard Robinson 5-yard run (Brendan Gibbons kick)	MICH 42–24

After the battle for the Little Brown Jug, Michigan traveled to Evanston, Illinois, for the first time since 2007 to play the Northwestern Wildcats. During the previous meeting between the schools in 2008, Northwestern won 21–14.

Michigan scored 28 unanswered points to erase a ten-point deficit and defeat Northwestern 42–24. Michigan scored first on a nine-yard reception by Steve Watson. Northwestern replied with a 15-yard touchdown run by Kain Colter, and then took the lead on a seven-yard run by Treyvon Green. In the second quarter, Michigan's Jeremy Gallon caught a 25-yard touchdown reception. The Wildcats responded with a two-yard touchdown run by Adonis Smith, and scored their final points of the game with a 20-yard field goal by Jeff Budzien. Michigan dominated the second half with four unanswered touchdowns. In the third quarter, Denard Robinson scored on a two-yard run, then Devin Gardner scored on a one-yard run. In the fourth quarter, Michael Shaw scored on a two-yard run, and Denard Robinson capped the victory with a five-yard run.

Michigan's 541 yard offensive performance was the second straight week the offense gained more than 500 yards of offense, and was the second highest total of the season, only beaten by the previous week's total of 581 yards against Minnesota. Denard Robinson's 337 yards of passing were one yard shy of his career high; he threw for 338 yards against Notre Dame on September 10, 2011. Michigan started a season 6–0 for the first time since 2006. Jordan Kovacs had two solo tackles for a loss, both on fourth down. Brady Hoke's 6–0 start was the first 6–0 start by a first-year Michigan coach since Bennie Oosterbaan did so in 1948.

=== At Michigan State ===
Michigan at Michigan State
(Paul Bunyan Trophy)

Team	1	2	3	4	Total
#11 Wolverines	7	0	0	7	14
• #23 Spartans	7	0	14	7	28

- Date: October 15
- Location: Spartan Stadium
  East Lansing, Michigan
- Game start: 12:00 p.m. EST
- Elapsed time: 3:27
- Game attendance: 77,515
- Game weather: 50 °F (10 °C), Mostly cloudy/gusty, WNW 24 mph (39 km/h)
- Referee: Bill LeMonnier
- TV announcers (ESPN): Dave Pasch, Chris Spielman, Urban Meyer & Quint Kessenich

Scoring summary
1	8:50	MICH	Denard Robinson 15-yard run (Brendan Gibbons kick)	MICH 7–0
1	5:08	MICH STATE	Edwin Baker 1-yard run (Dan Conroy kick)	Tied 7–7
3	11:07	MICH STATE	Keshawn Martin 10-yard pass from Kirk Cousins (Dan Conroy kick)	MSU 14–7
3	0:25	MICH STATE	Keshawn Martin 13-yard pass from Kirk Cousins (Dan Conroy kick)	MSU 21–7
4	9:49	MICH	Roy Roundtree 34-yard pass from Denard Robinson (Brendan Gibbons kick)	MSU 21–14
4	4:31	MICH STATE	Isaiah Lewis 39-yard interception return (Dan Conroy kick)	MSU 28–14

After its game against Northwestern, Michigan traveled to East Lansing to battle their in-state rival, the Michigan State Spartans, for the Paul Bunyan Trophy. Michigan was searching for its first win against Michigan State since 2007. Michigan State won the previous meeting 34–17. The Wolverines wore legacy road uniforms for the game with Michigan State, which were the road version of the uniform worn against Notre Dame. It was the first time that Michigan wore all white road uniforms since the 1976 Orange Bowl against Oklahoma. Michigan State also wore special alternate uniforms colored dark green, bronze and black.

Michigan State continued its recent dominance over Michigan, winning 28–14. The first half was relatively quiet, with each team only scoring one touchdown in the first quarter. Michigan's Denard Robinson ran in one from 15 yards out, with Michigan State responding with a one-yard touchdown run by Edwin Baker. After halftime, State's Kirk Cousins threw a 10-yard touchdown pass to Keshawn Martin to take the lead. The Spartans added more points with another touchdown catch by Martin, this one from 13 yards out. In the fourth quarter, Michigan scored their only points of the second half with a 34-yard touchdown catch and run by Roy Roundtree. State sealed their victory with a 39-yard interception return touchdown by Isaiah Lewis, handing Michigan their first loss of the season.

The game was Michigan's first against a ranked opponent in the 2011 season. Michigan's record against Michigan State in the overall series dropped to 68–35–2, while its record in games involving the Paul Bunyan Trophy dropped to 35–23–2. Denard Robinson's passing performance put him over 4,000 yards in his career, the 10th Michigan quarterback to do so, and his rushing performance moved him past Tim Biakabutuka for 10th place. Punter Will Hagerup placed four of his seven punts inside Michigan State's 20-yard line, and three of those inside the 15-yard line. The victory was Michigan State's fourth in a row against Michigan, the first time Michigan State had done this since a streak between 1959 and 1962.

=== Vs. Purdue ===
Purdue at Michigan
(Homecoming game)

Team	1	2	3	4	Total
Boilermakers	7	0	0	7	14
• #17 Wolverines	7	15	7	7	36

- Date: October 29
- Location: Michigan Stadium
  Ann Arbor, Michigan
- Game start: 12:00 p.m. EST
- Elapsed time: 3:04
- Game attendance: 112,115
- Game weather: Mostly cloudy, 48 °F (9 °C), SW 12 mph (19 km/h)
- Referee: Alex Kemp
- TV announcers (ESPN2): Beth Mowins, Mike Bellotti & Shelley Smith

Scoring summary
1	13:36	PUR	Gary Bush 48-yard pass from Caleb TerBush (Carson Wiggs kick)	PUR 7–0
1	7:30	MICH	Denard Robinson 2-yard run (Brendan Gibbons kick)	Tied 7–7
2	14:13	MICH	Safety, Caleb TerBush tackled by Mike Martin in end zone	MICH 9–7
2	11:23	MICH	Brendan Gibbons 37-yard field goal	MICH 12–7
2	5:36	MICH	Fitzgerald Toussaint 2-yard run (Brendan Gibbons kick)	MICH 19–7
2	0:00	MICH	Brendan Gibbons 22-yard field goal	MICH 22–7
3	2:48	MICH	Fitzgerald Toussaint 59-yard run (Brendan Gibbons kick)	MICH 29–7
4	12:32	MICH	Michael Shaw 37-yard run (Brendan Gibbons kick)	MICH 36–7
4	0:15	PUR	O.J. Ross 19-yard pass from Robert Marve (Carson Wiggs kick)	MICH 36–14

Following its trip to East Lansing and its bye week, Michigan hosted the Purdue Boilermakers for its homecoming game. During the previous meeting between the two schools, Michigan defeated Purdue 27–16 in a turnover filled game caused by heavy rain. The game ball was delivered via jet pack, as Michigan's homecoming theme for the year was space.

Michigan defeated Purdue 36–14. Purdue scored its only points of the first half when Caleb TerBush threw a 48-yard touchdown pass to Gary Bush. Michigan dominated the game following the Purdue score. The Wolverines responded to Purdue's touchdown with a touchdown of their own, a two-yard run by Denard Robinson, which was its fifth consecutive opening drive touchdown. In the second quarter, Michigan scored a safety when Mike Martin tackled Caleb TerBush in the end zone. A few minutes later, Michigan's Brendan Gibbons kicked a 37-yard field goal. Michigan added more points with a two-yard touchdown run by Fitzgerald Toussaint. The final score of the first half was a 22-yard Michigan field goal with no time left on the clock. After the intermission, Michigan scored the only points of the third quarter when Fitzgerald Toussaint scored his second touchdown of the game, this time on a 59-yard rush. The teams traded scores in the final quarter. First Michigan's Michael Shaw ran in a touchdown from 37 yards out, which was followed by Purdue's Robert Marve throwing a 19-yard touchdown pass to O.J. Ross. With the win, Michigan's record against Purdue improved to 43–14.

Junior quarterback Denard Robinson completed 9-of-14 passes for 170 yards and carried the ball 15 times for 63 yards and a touchdown. He scored his 29th career rushing touchdown on a two-yard run midway through the first quarter. Robinson moved to ninth place among Michigan's all-time leaders in the category, where he is tied with Butch Woolfolk (1978–81). Robinson has scored at least one rushing touchdown in seven straight games. Fitzgerald Toussaint recorded career highs in carries (20) and rushing yards (170) and matched a career best with two rushing touchdowns. Toussaint's second touchdown—a 59-yard rush in the third quarter—was the longest rush for a touchdown of his career, but missed his overall career long by two yards (61 yards vs. Bowling Green, September 25, 2010). The Apollo 15 flight crew, which consisted of all Michigan graduates, was honored during the first quarter.

=== At Iowa ===
Michigan at Iowa

Team	1	2	3	4	Total
#13 Wolverines	6	0	3	7	16
• Hawkeyes	7	10	0	7	24

- Date: November 5
- Location: Kinnick Stadium
  Iowa City, Iowa
- Game start: 12:00 p.m. EST
- Elapsed time: 3:11
- Game attendance: 70,585
- Game weather: 44 °F (7 °C), Partly Cloudy, SSE 13 mph (21 km/h),
- Referee: Dan Capron
- TV announcers (ESPN): Dave Pasch, Chris Spielman & Quint Kessenich

Scoring summary
1	10:29	IOWA	Marcus Coker 4-yard run (Mike Meyer kick)	IOWA 7–0
1	2:14	MICH	Fitzgerald Toussaint 5-yard pass from Denard Robinson (Two-point run conversion failed)	IOWA 7–6
2	6:58	IOWA	Brad Herman 1-yard pass from James Vandenberg (Mike Meyer kick)	IOWA 14–6
2	2:11	MICH	Mike Meyer 42-yard field goal	IOWA 17–6
3	6:19	MICH	Brendan Gibbons 32-yard field goal	IOWA 17–9
4	10:42	IOWA	Marcus Coker 13-yard run (Mike Meyer kick)	IOWA 24–9
4	7:53	MICH	Kevin Koger 7-yard pass from Denard Robinson (Brendan Gibbons kick)	IOWA 24–16

For its ninth game, Michigan traveled to Iowa City to meet the Iowa Hawkeyes. Iowa won the 2010 game, 38–28.

Iowa defeated Michigan 24–16 after Michigan was unable to score a touchdown from the three-yard line at the end of the game. Iowa scored first with a four-yard touchdown run by Marcus Coker. Michigan responded with a five-yard touchdown catch by Fitzgerald Toussaint, their only points of the first half; however, the extra point was botched due to a bad snap. In the second quarter, Iowa's Brad Herman caught a one-yard pass from James Vandenberg for a touchdown. Iowa's Mike Meyer then kicked a 42-yard field goal to add to the Hawkeyes' lead. After halftime, Michigan's Brendan Gibbons scored the only points of the 3rd quarter with a 32-yard field goal. Iowa then scored its only points of the second half when Marcus Coker scored his second touchdown of the day, this time with a 13-yard rush. Michigan responded with a seven-yard touchdown catch by Kevin Koger.

Junior Hemingway had 64 yards on five catches to pass Adrian Arrington and take over 20th place with 1,453 career yards. Fitzgerald Toussaint made his first career touchdown reception on just the third catch of his career. Denard Robinson moved to ninth place all-time on the Michigan career rushing yards list, with his then total of 2,933 yards surpassing Gordon Bell's total of 2,900 yards.

=== At Illinois ===
Michigan at Illinois

Team	1	2	3	4	Total
• #22 Wolverines	7	7	3	14	31
Fighting Illini	0	0	7	7	14

- Date: November 12
- Location: Memorial Stadium
  Champaign, Illinois
- Game start: 3:30 p.m. EST
- Elapsed time: 3:23
- Game attendance: 60,670
- Game weather: 59 °F (15 °C), Overcast/Breezy, S 21 mph (34 km/h)
- Referee: John O'Neill
- TV announcers (ABC/ESPN): Justin Kutcher & Craig James

Scoring summary
1	13:15	MICH	Denard Robinson 9-yard run (Brendan Gibbons kick)	MICH 7–0
2	12:49	MICH	Denard Robinson 2-yard run (Brendan Gibbons kick)	MICH 14–0
3	4:31	MICH	Brendan Gibbons 27-yard field goal	MICH 17–0
3	0:19	ILL	Nathan Scheelhaase 13-yard run (Derek Dimke kick)	MICH 17–7
4	9:58	MICH	Martavious Odoms 27-yard pass from Devin Gardner (Brendan Gibbons kick)	MICH 24–7
4	3:12	ILL	Jason Ford 1-yard run (Derek Dimke kick)	MICH 24–14
4	2:24	MICH	Fitzgerald Toussaint 27-yard run (Brendan Gibbons kick)	MICH 31–14

Following its trip to Iowa, Michigan played on the road for the second consecutive week against the Illinois Fighting Illini. In 2010, the Wolverines and Illini had played in the highest combined scoring game in Michigan Stadium history, with Michigan prevailing 67–65 in triple overtime.

Michigan dominated the game, defeating Illinois 31–14. Michigan scored two touchdowns in the first half. Fitzgerald Toussaint ran for 121 yards in the first quarter, including a 65-yard run on the second play of the game to set up a nine-yard touchdown run by Denard Robinson. In the second quarter, Robinson scored his second rushing touchdown of the game on a two-yard run. Michigan lost another scoring opportunity in the second quarter after tight end Kevin Koger gained 40 yards on a pass from Robinson. Robinson ran for an apparent touchdown from the eight-yard line, but the call was reversed when replay officials ruled that Robinson had stepped out of bounds at the two-yard line. On fourth down from the one-yard line, Robinson was stopped after a low snap slowed his momentum. A fumble by Robinson ended another drive, and Brendan Gibbons missed a 38-yard field goal with one minute left in the half. Michigan's defense held Illinois to 30 total yards in the first half. In the third quarter, Gibbons kicked a 27-yard field goal, but Illinois responded with a touchdown on a one-yard run by Nathan Scheelhaase. Denard Robinson left the game in the third quarter after sustaining a blow to his wrist. In the fourth quarter, J.T. Floyd intercepted a Scheelhaase pass and returned it 43 yards into Illinois territory. Shortly thereafter, backup quarterback Devin Gardner threw a 27-yard touchdown pass to Martavious Odoms to put Michigan ahead 24–7. Illinois closed the gap to 24–14 on an 18-play drive capped by a one-yard touchdown run by Jason Ford. After the touchdown, the Illini attempted an onside kick, but Michigan recovered, and Toussaint ran 27 yards for Michigan's fourth and final touchdown.

Michigan's defense forced three turnovers, sacked the Illinois quarterback four times, and held Illinois' offense to 37 rushing yards on 33 attempts for an average of 1.1 yards per carry. Mike Martin led the defense with nine tackles. After the game, Michigan's defensive coordinator Greg Mattison became emotional as he told reporters: "That was a Michigan defense. ... Nobody knows what went on inside of these guys and for them to stick together and to play like they played tonight, and like they have tried in every game, it says a lot about them." Defensive end Ryan Van Bergen, who recorded 2.5 sacks, three tackles for loss and seven tackles overall, was named the Big Ten's Co-Defensive Player of the Week. Toussaint's 65-yard touchdown run and his total of 192 rushing yards were career highs.

=== Vs. Nebraska ===
Nebraska at Michigan

Team	1	2	3	4	Total
#17 Cornhuskers	7	3	7	0	17
• #20 Wolverines	10	7	14	14	45

- Date: November 19
- Location: Michigan Stadium
  Ann Arbor, Michigan
- Game start: 12:00 p.m. EST
- Elapsed time: 3:30
- Game attendance: 113,718
- Game weather: 47 °F (8 °C), Partly Cloudy, S 17 mph (27 km/h)
- Referee: Dennis Lipski
- TV announcers (ESPN): Dave Pasch, Chris Spielman, Urban Meyer & Quint Kessenich

Scoring summary
1	8:17	MICH	Jeremy Gallon 7-yard pass from Denard Robinson (Brendan Gibbons kick)	MICH 7–0
1	2:03	MICH	Brendan Gibbons 42-yard field goal	MICH 10–0
1	1:17	NEB	Brandon Kinnie 54-yard pass from Taylor Martinez (Brett Maher kick)	MICH 10–7
2	12:12	NEB	Brett Maher 51-yard field goal	Tied 10–10
2	6:05	MICH	Denard Robinson 14-yard run (Brendan Gibbons kick)	MICH 17–10
3	11:23	MICH	Denard Robinson 1-yard run (Brendan Gibbons kick)	MICH 24–10
3	5:03	MICH	Fitzgerald Toussaint 1-yard run (Brendan Gibbons kick)	MICH 31–10
3	0:53	NEB	Ameer Abdullah 3-yard run (Brett Maher kick)	MICH 31–17
4	10:14	MICH	Martavious Odoms 38-yard pass from Denard Robinson (Brendan Gibbons kick)	MICH 38–17
4	7:33	MICH	Fitzgerald Toussaint 31-yard run (Brendan Gibbons kick)	MICH 45–17

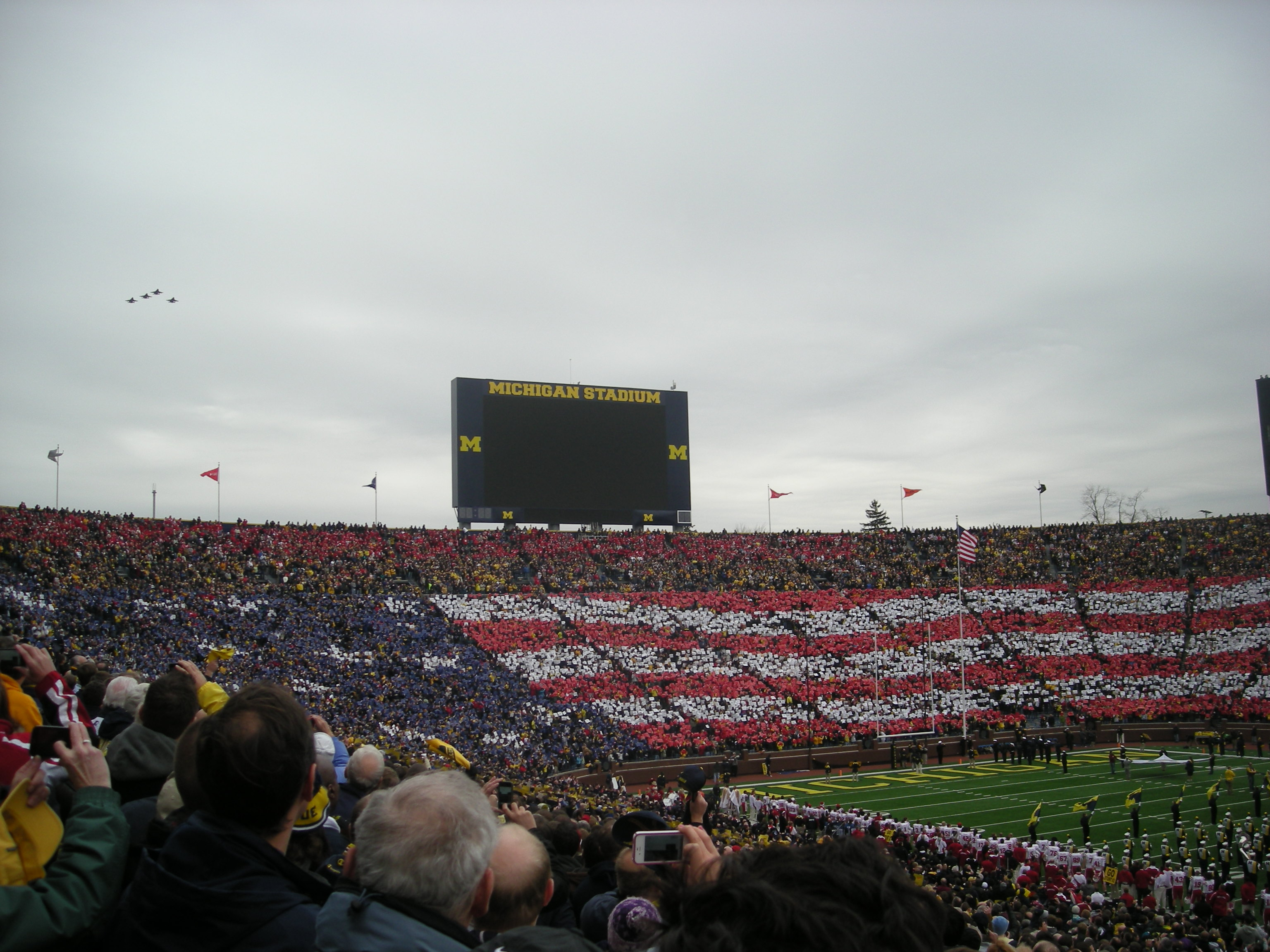
The card stunt and flyover prior to the game

In the penultimate game of the 2011 regular season, Michigan hosted the Nebraska Cornhuskers, competing in their first season as a member of the Big Ten Conference and appearing in Michigan Stadium for the first time since 1962. The teams had last met in the 2005 Alamo Bowl, which Nebraska won 32–28. In celebration of Military Appreciation Day, Michigan held a card stunt and had a flyover of four F-16 fighter jets prior to kickoff, and the Wolverines wore American flag patches on their jerseys. Michigan also honored former head coach Lloyd Carr at the game.

Michigan dominated Nebraska, winning 45–17. Michigan took an early lead when Jeremy Gallon caught a six-yard touchdown pass and then added three more points when Brendan Gibbons kicked a 42-yard field goal. Late in the first quarter, Nebraska narrowed the gap when Brandon Kinnie caught a 54-yard touchdown pass from Taylor Martinez. In the second quarter, each team scored once. The Cornhuskers' Brett Maher kicked a 51-yard field goal, and Denard Robinson responded with a 14-yard touchdown run. Michigan led 17–10 at halftime. At the start of the third quarter, Nebraska's Kenny Bell fumbled while returning the opening kickoff, and Michigan recovered the ball. The turnover led to a one-yard touchdown run by Denard Robinson. Fitzgerald Toussaint also scored on a one-yard touchdown run in the third quarter. Later in the third quarter, Nebraska closed the gap to 31–17 on a three-yard touchdown run by Ameer Abdullah. Josh Furman also blocked a punt in the third quarter, the first punt block by Michigan since 2009. In the fourth quarter, Michigan outscored Nebraska 14–0 with a 38-yard touchdown catch by Martavious Odoms and a 31-yard run by Toussaint.

Michigan's defense held Nebraska to three successful conversions on 13 third downs. The Wolverines ran 80 plays in the game and maintained possession for 41 minutes and 13 seconds during the 60 minutes of play. Denard Robinson was honored for the sixth time in his career as the Big Ten's Offensive Player of the Week, having run for two touchdowns, passed for two more, and accounted for 263 yard of total offense (180 passing yards and 83 rushing yards), more than the entire Nebraska team. Michigan improved to 4–2–1 in its all-time series against Nebraska.

=== Vs. Ohio State ===
Ohio State at Michigan
(Michigan–Ohio State rivalry game)

Team	1	2	3	4	Total
Buckeyes	7	17	0	10	34
• #17 Wolverines	16	7	7	10	40

- Date: November 26
- Location: Michigan Stadium
  Ann Arbor, Michigan
- Game start: 12:00 p.m. EST
- Elapsed time: 3:35
- Game attendance: 114,132
- Game weather: 55 °F (13 °C), Partly Cloudy, S 15 mph (24 km/h)
- Referee: Bill LeMonnier
- TV announcers (ABC): Dave Pasch, Chris Spielman & Quint Kessenich

Scoring summary
1	12:43	OSU	Corey Brown 54-yard pass from Braxton Miller (Drew Basil kick)	OSU 7–0
1	9:15	MICH	Denard Robinson 41-yard run (Brendan Gibbons kick)	Tied 7–7
1	7:41	MICH	Safety, holding penalty on Mike Adams in end zone	MICH 9–7
1	3:02	MICH	Junior Hemingway 26-yard pass from Denard Robinson (Brendan Gibbons kick)	MICH 16–7
2	10:37	OSU	Drew Basil 45-yard field goal	MICH 16–10
2	7:51	OSU	Braxton Miller 19-yard run (Drew Basil kick)	OSU 17–16
2	3:16	MICH	Denard Robinson 6-yard run (Brendan Gibbons kick)	MICH 23–17
2	1:21	OSU	DeVier Posey 43-yard pass from Braxton Miller (Drew Basil kick)	OSU 24–23
3	9:05	MICH	Martavious Odoms 20-yard pass from Denard Robinson (Brendan Gibbons kick)	MICH 30–24
4	12:50	OSU	Drew Basil 21-yard field goal	MICH 30–27
4	8:32	MICH	Kevin Koger 4-yard pass from Denard Robinson (Brendan Gibbons kick)	MICH 37–27
4	7:09	OSU	Dan Herron 4-yard run (Drew Basil kick)	MICH 37–34
4	1:59	MICH	Brendan Gibbons 43-yard field goal	MICH 40–34

The Wolverines completed the regular season at home with the 108th Michigan–Ohio State rivalry game against the Ohio State Buckeyes. Ohio State won the 2010 game 37–7, but later vacated the win as part of its self-imposed sanctions after it was discovered that five players had received improper benefits and had played while ineligible. This was the first time the schools met with both having head coaches in their first season since 1929, when Harry Kipke became the head coach at Michigan and Sam Willaman became the head coach at Ohio State.

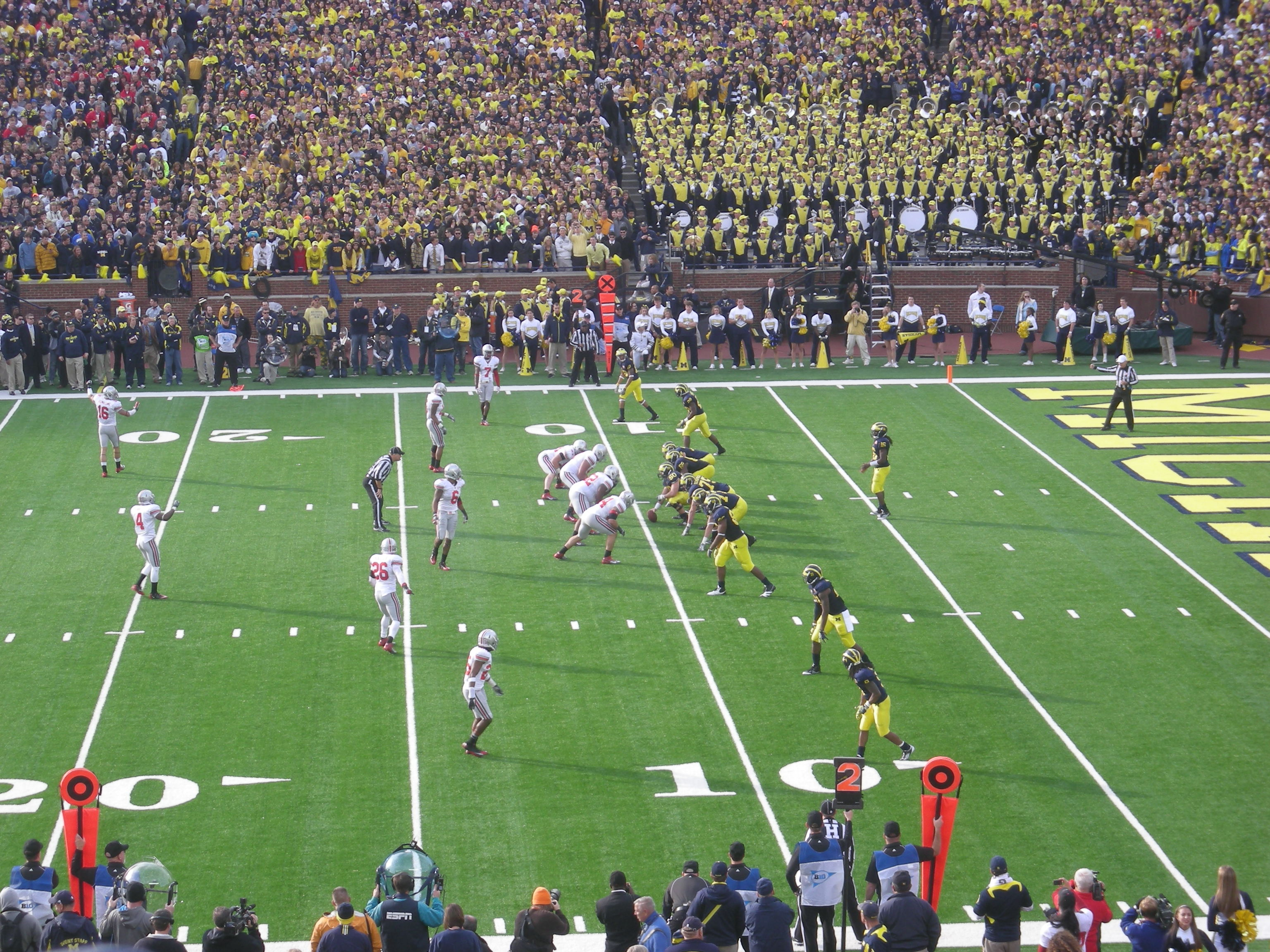
Michigan on offense against Ohio State

Michigan defeated Ohio State for the first time in eight years, winning 40–34. Ohio State took the lead in the first quarter when Corey Brown caught a 54-yard touchdown pass from Braxton Miller. Michigan tied it up when Denard Robinson ran 41 yards for a touchdown and took the lead when Ohio State's Mike Adams committed a holding penalty in the end zone for a safety. Michigan extended its lead to 16–7 when Junior Hemingway caught a 26-yard pass for a touchdown. In the second quarter, Ohio State's Drew Basil completed a 45-yard field goal, and the Buckeyes took a 17–16 lead when Braxton Miller ran 19 yards for a touchdown. Michigan regained the lead on a six-yard touchdown run by Denard Robinson. Ohio State responded with a 43-yard touchdown pass to DeVier Posey and led 24–23 at halftime. In the third quarter, Martavious Odoms scored for Michigan on a 20-yard touchdown pass. After a muffed punt by Michigan's Will Hagerup at the end of the third quarter, Drew Basil kicked a 21-yard field goal early in the fourth quarter. Michigan responded with a four-yard touchdown catch by Kevin Koger, and Daniel Herron ran for an Ohio State touchdown from four yards out. Michigan scored the final points of the game on a career-long 43-yard field goal by Brendan Gibbons. The Wolverines sealed the victory when Courtney Avery intercepted a Braxton Miller pass with 39 seconds remaining.

Denard Robinson completed 14 of 17 passes for 167 yards and three touchdowns and rushed for 170 yards and two touchdowns. He became the first Michigan player in the modern era to score two rushing and two passing touchdowns in consecutive games. Fitzgerald Toussaint also rushed for 120 yards to pass the 1,000 yard mark, giving the Wolverines a duo of 1,000-yard rushers for the first time since 1975 when Gordon Bell and Rob Lytle accomplished the feat. The Wolverines improved to 58–44–6 in the all-time series against the Buckeyes. With the victory, Michigan also concluded its first undefeated season at home since 2006, along with its first ever eight win season at home. Brady Hoke became the second Michigan head coach to win 10 games in his first season, with the first being Fielding Yost.

=== Vs. Virginia Tech ===
Virginia Tech vs Michigan
(Sugar Bowl)

Team	1	2	3	4	OT	Total
• #13 Wolverines	0	10	7	3	3	23
#17 Hokies	3	3	11	3	0	20

- Date: January 3
- Location: Mercedes-Benz Superdome
  New Orleans, Louisiana
- Game start: 8:30 p.m. EST
- Elapsed time: 3:26
- Game attendance: 64,512
- Game weather: Indoors
- Referee: Jay Stricherz
- TV announcers (ESPN): Brad Nessler, Todd Blackledge & Holly Rowe

Scoring summary
1	7:04	VT	Justin Myer 37-yard field goal	VT 3–0
2	14:10	VT	Justin Myer 43-yard field goal	VT 6–0
2	0:49	MICH	Junior Hemingway 45-yard pass from Denard Robinson (Brendan Gibbons kick)	MICH 7–6
2	0:00	MICH	Brendan Gibbons 24-yard field goal	MICH 10–6
3	9:43	MICH	Junior Hemingway 18-yard pass from Denard Robinson (Brendan Gibbons kick)	MICH 17–6
3	4:48	VT	Justin Myer 36-yard field goal	MICH 17–9
4	10:22	VT	Logan Thomas 1-yard run (Logan Thomas to Marcus Davis pass)	Tied 17–17
4	4:00	MICH	Brendan Gibbons 39-yard field goal	MICH 20–17
4	0:02	VT	Justin Myer 25-yard field goal	Tied 20–20
OT		MICH	Brendan Gibbons 37-yard field goal	MICH 23–20

On December 4, Michigan was selected to play in the Sugar Bowl against the Virginia Tech Hokies. It was Michigan's first BCS bowl game since the 2006 season, when Michigan was defeated by the USC Trojans in the 2007 Rose Bowl. The meeting between the Hokies and the Wolverines was the first between the two schools. Virginia Tech was forced to use its third-string kicker during the game, as first-string kicker Cody Journell was suspended for the game as a result of an arrest for breaking-and-entering, while second-string kicker Tyler Weiss was suspended from the game and sent home for missing curfew.

Virginia Tech dominated the majority of the first half. In the first quarter, Virginia Tech's third-string kicker Justin Myer kicked a 37-yard field goal, which was the only scoring play of the quarter. Myer added a 43-yard field goal in the second quarter. At the end of the half, however, Denard Robinson threw a 45-yard touchdown pass to Junior Hemingway to give Michigan a 7–6 lead and on the ensuing kickoff, Michigan's J.B. Fitzgerald forced a fumble, which Michigan recovered. Michigan's Brendan Gibbons kicked a 24-yard field goal as time expired. In the third quarter, Michigan scored another touchdown on a Denard Robinson to Junior Hemingway pass, this time from 18 yards out. This scoring drive followed an interception by linebacker Frank Clark. Virginia Tech responded with another Justin Myer field goal, this time from 36 yards away. In the fourth quarter, Virginia Tech's quarterback Logan Thomas trimmed Michigan's lead to two points, and then promptly tied the game throwing a successful two-point conversion to Marcus Davis. Michigan responded with a 39-yard Brendan Gibbons field goal, but Virginia Tech tied the game with two seconds remaining via a 25-yard field goal by Myer. In overtime, Virginia Tech seemingly scored the go-ahead touchdown on a Logan Thomas to Danny Coale pass, but video review overturned the play. The next play saw Myer miss a 37-yard field goal. Michigan received the ball and saw Gibbons kick the game-winning 37-yard field goal.

The game was Michigan's fifth BCS bowl appearance. With the victory, Michigan won the only BCS bowl that it had not yet won, improved its bowl record to 20–21, and improved its record against the ACC to 19–3. Michigan also moved to 2–0 in overtime in bowl games, with the previous victory coming in the 2000 Orange Bowl. Hemingway, who caught both Michigan touchdowns, was named the Sugar Bowl MVP. Brady Hoke became the eighth coach to lead a team to a BCS bowl and third to win a BCS bowl in his first season.

== Awards and honors ==
At the conclusion of the season, several Wolverines players and coaches received national and/or conference honors. David Molk received the Rimington Trophy as the best center in college football. He was also a consensus All-American, receiving first-team honors from the Associated Press, Football Writers Association of America, Scout.com, Sporting News, and the Walter Camp Football Foundation. Molk also received the inaugural Rimington–Pace Big Ten Offensive Lineman of the Year award.

Brady Hoke won the Hayes–Schembechler Coach of the Year, as selected by conference coaches, and the Dave McClain Coach of the Year, as picked by the media. Hoke was also a finalist for national coach of the year honors in the Bear Bryant Award, Liberty Mutual Coach of the Year Award, and Eddie Robinson Coach of the Year award. Defensive coordinator Greg Mattison was selected as one of five finalists for the 2011 Broyles Award.

Three Michigan players received second-team All-Big Ten honors: (1) Mike Martin by both the coaches and the media, (2) Denard Robinson by the media, and (3) Taylor Lewan by the coaches. Lewan also received honorable mention All-American recognition by the Pro Football Weekly, and Robinson received the same recognition from Sports Illustrated. Jake Ryan, Desmond Morgan, Matt Wile and Blake Countess all earned 2011 Big Ten All-Freshman team recognition from both ESPN.com and BTN.com, while Ryan, Morgan and Countess earned 2011 College Football News All-Freshman honorable mention honors as well. Countess was also a Sporting News All-Freshman selection, while Ryan was a second team Rivals.com All-Freshman selection. Safety Jordan Kovacs was named a quarterfinalist for the Lott Trophy and a semifinalist for the 2011 Burlsworth Trophy. He also received the Big Ten Sportsmanship Award for the Michigan program.

Several Michigan players were invited to post-season all-star games: Junior Hemingway Kevin Koger to the 2012 East–West Shrine Game, David Molk and Mike Martin to the 2012 Senior Bowl, Michael Shaw to the Casino del Sol All-Star Game, Marell Evans to the NFLPA Collegiate Bowl, and Martavious Odoms to the Battle of Florida All-Star Game.

== Statistics ==
Michigan finished the season ranked third in the Big Ten in total offense and second in scoring offense. Defensively, the team improved dramatically finishing fourth in total defense in the Big Ten and 17th in the country.

Denard Robinson led the Big Ten in total offense for the second consecutive year and finished fifth in the conference in rushing with an average of 90.46 rushing yards per game. Jeremy Gallon finished third in the conference with an average of 10.11 yards per punt return. Kenny Demens led the team in tackles with 7.23 per game. The per game team rankings below include 120 Football Bowl Subdivision teams and 12 Big Ten Conference teams.

Category	National rank	Actual	National leader	Actual	Conference rank	Big Ten Conference leader	Actual
Rushing Offense	13	221.85	Army	346.50	2	Wisconsin	235.57
Passing Offense	93	182.85	Houston	450.57	8	Northwestern	254.23
Total Offense	42	404.69	Houston	599.07	3	Wisconsin	469.86
Scoring Offense	26	33.31	Houston	49.29	2	Wisconsin	44.14
Rushing Defense	39	131.69	Alabama	72.15	3	Michigan State	100.50
Pass Efficiency Defense	36	120.49	Alabama	83.69	6	Penn State	107.16
Total Defense	17	322.15	Alabama	183.62	4	Michigan State	277.43
Scoring Defense	6	17.38	Alabama	8.15	2	Penn State	16.77
Net Punting	109	33.41	Oregon	41.45	12	Iowa	38.45
Punt returns	53	9.00	FIU	15.93	5	Northwestern	15.88
Kickoff returns	117	18.43	Purdue	28.68	11	Purdue	28.68
Turnover Margin	25	.54	Oklahoma State	1.62	2	Wisconsin	1.14
Pass defense	16	190.46	Alabama	111.46	5	Illinois	162.31
Passing Efficiency	40	139.20	Baylor	191.22	4	Wisconsin	186.16
Sacks	29	2.31	Texas A&M	3.92	4	Illinois	3.15
Tackles For Loss	68	5.54	Cincinnati	8.62	6	Illinois	7.92
Sacks Allowed	33	1.38	Boise State	.62	3	Penn State	1.08

The per game rankings below include players who played in 75% of teams' games and were ranked in the top 100 national leaders and top 25 conference leaders:

Category	Player	National rank	Actual	National leader	Actual	Conference rank	Big Ten Conference leader	Actual
Rushing	Denard Robinson	39	90.46	LaMichael James	150.42	5	Montee Ball	137.36
	Fitzgerald Toussaint	44	86.75			7		
Passing Efficiency (Min. 15 Att./Game)	Denard Robinson	39	149.58	Russell Wilson	191.78	6	Wilson (Wisconsin)	191.78
Total Offense	Denard Robinson	32	257.62	Case Keenum	404.71	1	Robinson (Michigan)	257.62
	Fitzgerald Toussaint		86.75			18		
Receptions Per Game	Junior Hemingway		2.62	Jordan White	10.77	18	A.J. Jenkins	6.92
	Jeremy Gallon		2.38			22		
Receiving Yards Per Game	Junior Hemingway		53.77	White (Western Michigan)	147.00	3	Marvin McNutt	101.51
	Jeremy Gallon		34.85			19		
	Roy Roundtree		27.31			23		
Interceptions	Courtney Avery		.15	David Amerson	1.00	T-20	Brian Peters (Northwestern)	.38
	J.T. Floyd		.15			T-20		
Punting (Min. 3.6 Punts/Game)				Shawn Powell (Florida State)	47.04		Brett Maher	44.51
Punt returns (Min. 1.2 Ret./Game)	Jeremy Gallon	26	10.11	Dustin Harris (Texas A&M)	18.61	3	Jared Abbrederis (Wisconsin)	15.75
Kickoff returns (Min. 1.2 Ret./Game)	Martaveous Odoms		23.32	Raheem Mostert	37.35	9	Mostert (Purdue)	29.29
	Jeremy Gallon		21.81			12		
Field Goals	Brendan Gibbons		1.00	Randy Bullock	2.23	8	Carson Wiggs (Purdue)	1.85
Scoring	Denard Robinson	T-60	7.38	Ball (Wisconsin)	16.71	T-5	Ball (Wisconsin)	16.71
	Brendan Gibbons	T-69	7.15			7		
	Fitzgerald Toussaint		5.00			19		
All-Purpose Runners	Denard Robinson		90.46	Tavon Austin	198.00	11	Ball (Wisconsin)	160.29
	Fitzgerald Toussaint		89.04			13		
Sacks	Ryan Van Bergen		.42	Whitney Mercilus	1.19	T-9	Mercilus (Illinois)	1.08
	Jordan Kovacs		.33			T-17		
	Craig Roh		.31			T-21		
Tackles	Kenny Demens		7.23	Luke Kuechly	15.92	T-13	Mike Taylor (Wisconsin)	10.71
Tackles For Loss	Ryan Van Bergen	T-94	.96	Sammy Brown (Houston)	2.14	11	Mercilus (Illinois)	2.17
	Jake Ryan		.85			T-16		
	Jordan Kovacs		.67			25		

== Personnel ==
=== Roster ===
2011 Michigan Wolverines football team roster
Players
Coaches
Offense

Pos.	#	Name	Class
RB	2	Vincent Smith	Jr
QB	3	Russell Bellomy	Fr
QB	4	Steve Wilson	Jr
RB	5	Justice Hayes	Fr
QB	7	Devin Gardner	So
QB	8	Alex Swieca	Fr
WR	9	Martavious Odoms	Sr
WR	10	Jeremy Gallon	So
WR	12	Roy Roundtree	Jr
QB	13	Ben Fry	Fr
QB	14	Jack Kennedy	Jr
RB	15	Michael Cox	Jr
QB	16	Denard Robinson	Jr
WR	17	Jeremy Jackson	So
RB	18	Jihad Rasheed	RFr
WR	19	Kelvin Grady	Sr
RB	20	Michael Shaw	Sr
WR	21	Junior Hemingway	Sr
WR	22	Darryl Stonum (S)	Sr
WR	26	Drew Dileo	So
WR	27	Jonathan Keizer	Fr
RB	28	Fitzgerald Toussaint	So
RB	33	Stephen Hopkins	So
WR	35	Jordan Barpal	Jr
FB	36	Joe Kerridge	Fr
RB	38	Thomas Rawls	Fr
TE	40	Nate Allspach	RFr
TE	42	Dylan Esterline	RFr
FB	49	John McColgan	Sr
OL (C)	50	David Molk	Sr
OL	52	Ricky Barnum	Jr
OL	56	Joey Burzynski	RFr
OL	57	Elliott Mealer	Jr
OL	58	Chris Bryant	Fr
OL	60	Jack Miller	Fr
OL	61	Graham Glasgow	Fr
OL	63	Rocko Khoury	Jr
OL	65	Patrick Omameh	Jr
OL	69	Erik Gunderson	So
OL	70	Kristian Mateus	RFr
OL	72	Mark Huyge	Sr
OL	75	Michael Schofield	So
OL	77	Taylor Lewan	So
TE	80	Ricardo Miller	RFr
TE	81	Mike Kwiatkowski	Jr
WR	82	Terrence Robinson	Jr
WR	83	Jerald Robinson	RFr
TE	84	Steve Watson	Sr
WR	85	Joe Reynolds	So
TE (C)	86	Kevin Koger	Sr
TE	89	Brandon Moore	Jr

Defense

Pos.	#	Name	Class
S	3	Marvin Robinson	So
S	4	Cameron Gordon	So
CB	5	Courtney Avery	So
DB	6	Raymon Taylor	Fr
S	7	Brandin Hawthorne	Jr
CB	8	J. T. Floyd	Jr
S	14	Josh Furman	RFr
CB	17	Tony Anderson	Sr
DB	18	Blake Countess	Fr
S	19	Charlie Zeller	So
DB	20	Tamani Carter	Fr
S	23	Floyd Simmons	Jr
DB	24	Delonte Hollowell	Fr
LB	25	Kenny Demens	Jr
LB	27	Mike Jones	So
S	28	Matthew Cavanaugh	Jr
CB	29	Troy Woolfolk	Sr
S	30	Thomas Gordon	So
S	31	Jared Van Slyke	Sr
S	32	Jordan Kovacs	Jr
LB	34	Isaiah Bell	So
S	36	Zac Johnson	Sr
CB	37	Terrence Talbott	So
CB	38	Al Backey	So
DT	39	Will Heininger	Sr
LB	40	Antonio Poole	Fr
DT	41	Kenny Wilkins	RFr
LB	42	J.B. Fitzgerald	Sr
LB	44	Desmond Morgan	Fr
LB	51	Marell Evans	Sr
DE	53	Ryan Van Bergen	Sr
DT	54	Richard Ash	RFr
DE	55	Jibreel Black	So
LB	57	Frank Clark	Fr
LB	58	Brandon Herron	Sr
DT	60	Alex Schwab	Jr
DT	67	Nathan Brink	So
DT (C)	68	Mike Martin	Sr
DT	73	William Campbell	Jr
DT	76	Quinton Washington	So
DE	88	Craig Roh	Jr
LB	90	Jake Ryan	RFr
DE	92	Keith Heitzman	Fr
DE	93	Chris Eddins	RFr
LB	94	Jordan Paskorz	RFr
DE	95	Chris Rock	Fr
LB	97	Brennen Beyer	Fr
LB	99	Paul Gyarmati	Jr

Special teams

Pos.	#	Name	Class
K	31	Christopher Smith	Fr
PK	34	Brendan Gibbons	So
P	43	Will Hagerup	So
PK	45	Matt Wile	Fr
PK	46	Seth Broekhuizen	So
LS	54	Jareth Glanda	So
LS	66	George Morales	Jr
LS	91	Tom Pomarico	Sr
PK	93	Kris Pauloski	So
LS	94	Curt Graman	So
PK	96	Jeremy Ross	RFr

Head coach

- Brady Hoke

Coordinators/assistant coaches

- Al Borges (Offensive coordinator / quarterbacks)
- Greg Mattison (Defensive coordinator)
- Dan Ferrigno (Tight ends / special teams)
- Darrell Funk (Offensive line)
- Jeff Hecklinski (Wide receivers)
- Fred Jackson (Running backs)
- Curt Mallory (Defensive backs)
- Jerry Montgomery (Defensive line)
- Mark Smith (Linebackers)
- Roy Manning (Offensive graduate assistant)
- Aubrey Pleasant (Defensive graduate assistant)
- Mike Vollmar (Associate Athletics Director for Football)
- Bob Lopez (Director of Football Operations)

Legend

- (C) Team captain
- (S) Suspended
- (I) Ineligible
- Injured
- Redshirt

Roster

=== Depth chart ===
Starters and backups versus Virginia Tech.

Defense

FS
Troy Woolfolk
Thomas Gordon
Josh Furman

WLB	MLB	SLB
⋅	Kenny Demens	⋅
Brandin Hawthorne	J.B. Fitzgerald	⋅
Brandon Herron	Mike Jones	⋅

SS
Jordan Kovacs
Marvin Robinson
Zachary Johnson

CB
J.T. Floyd
Courtney Avery
Tony Anderson

DE	DT	DT	DE
Craig Roh	Mike Martin	Will Heininger	Ryan Van Bergen
Jibreel Black	Will Campbell	Quinton Washington	Nathan Brink
Frank Clark	⋅	⋅	⋅

CB
Blake Countess
Ramon Taylor
⋅

Offense

WR
Roy Roundtree
Kelvin Grady
Jeremy Jackson

LT	LG	C	RG	RT
Taylor Lewan	Ricky Barnum	David Molk	Patrick Omameh	Mark Huyge
Michael Schofield	Elliott Mealer	Rocko Khoury	Elliott Mealer	Michael Schofield
⋅	⋅	⋅	⋅	⋅

TE
Kevin Koger
Steve Watson
Brandon Moore

WR
Junior Hemingway
Jeremy Gallon
Martavious Odoms

QB
Denard Robinson
Devin Gardner
⋅

RB
Fitzgerald Toussaint
Vincent Smith
Michael Shaw

FB
Stephen Hopkins
John McColgan
⋅

Special teams
PK Brendan Gibbons
PK Matt Wile
P Will Hagerup
KR Jeremy Gallon/Drew Dileo
PR Jeremy Gallon
LS Tom Pomarico
H Drew Dileo

=== Captains and co-captains ===
Season captains Kevin Koger (TE-#86), David Molk (C-#50), and Michael Martin (DT-#68)

Game co-captains Zachary Johnson (S-#36)-Michigan vs. Michigan State University on October 15, 2011, Jared VanSlyke (DB-#31)-Michigan vs. Virginia Tech on December 4, 2012

== Radio ==
On August 8, 2011, the University of Michigan announced a five-year extension of its contract with CBS Radio. Detroit's WWJ became the new flagship station. All games were broadcast by radio on the Michigan Wolverines Football Network and on Sirius XM Satellite Radio. The radio announcers were Frank Beckmann (play-by-play), Jim Brandstatter (color commentary), and Doug Karsch (sideline reports).

== 2012 NFL draft ==
Three Michigan players (Mike Martin, Junior Hemingway and David Molk) were invited to the 2012 NFL Scouting Combine. The 2012 NFL draft was held in late April. Martin was drafted 82nd overall by the Tennessee Titans; Molk was drafted 226th by the San Diego Chargers; and Hemingway 238th by the Kansas City Chiefs. Prior to the draft, the Houston Texans informed Ryan Van Bergen that they were targeting him with their sixth round pick. However, the team drafted two defensive linemen in earlier rounds (Whitney Mercilus and Jared Crick) and did not pick Van Bergen; he subsequently signed with the Carolina Panthers, minutes after the draft ended on April 28. Later that day, Troy Woolfolk and Michael Shaw announced via Twitter through their agents that they had signed with the Dallas Cowboys and Washington Redskins, respectively. Seniors J.B. Fitzgerald (linebacker) and Will Heininger (defensive lineman) announced that they did not intend to pursue careers playing professional football. Toney Clemons, who had previously transferred from Michigan to Colorado was drafted in the seventh round.

Rnd.	Pick	Team	Player	Pos.	College	Notes
3	82	Tennessee Titans	Mike Martin	DT	Michigan	
7	226	San Diego Chargers	David Molk	C	Michigan	
7	238	Kansas City Chiefs	Junior Hemingway	WR	Michigan	from New England
