= Desmond Morgan =

American football player and coach (born 1992)

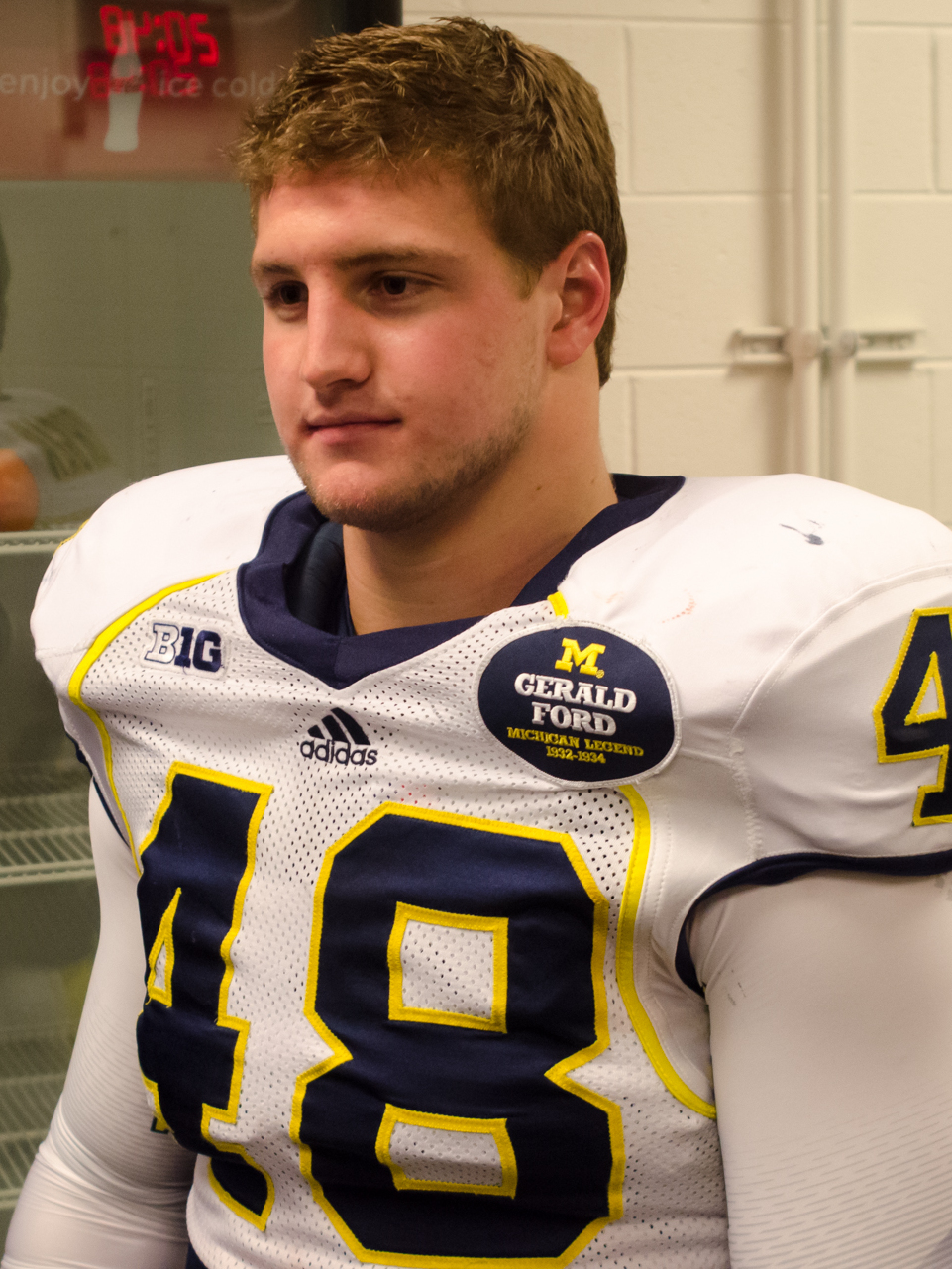
- Morgan in 2013

Current position
- Title: Assistant Safeties Coach
- Team: Auburn Tigers
- Conference: AAC

Biographical details
- Born: September 9, 1992 (age 34); Holland, Michigan, U.S
- Education: University of Michigan

Playing career
- 2011–2015: Michigan
- Position: Linebacker

Coaching career (HC unless noted)
- 2016: Wayne State (MI) (GA)
- 2017–2018: Maryland (GA)
- 2019: Minnesota (STQC)
- 2020–2022: Indiana State (LB)
- 2023–2025: Memphis (senior DA)

Accomplishments and honors

Awards
- ESPN.com and BTN.com Big Ten All-Freshman (2011); College Football News All-Freshman honorable mention (2011)

Desmond Morgan (born September 9, 1992) is an American college football coach and former linebacker. He is the Safeties Coach for Auburn University, a position he has held since January 2026. He played college football for the Michigan Wolverines football team from 2011 to 2015. He was a 2011 ESPN.com and BTN.com Big Ten All-Freshman selection as well as a 2011 College Football News All-Freshman honorable mention for the 2011 team.

== High school career ==
When Morgan was in high school, he worked out at a local gym in Holland, Michigan, that his father, Scott Morgan, went on to purchase in January 2017. He played linebacker and quarterback for West Ottawa High School, earning The Holland Sentinel Defensive Player of the Year recognition in 2010. In high school, Morgan was rated as the 24th and 42nd best high school football inside or middle linebacker in the national class of 2011 by ESPN and Scout.com, respectively. Rivals.com rated him as the 25th best football player in the state of Michigan. Morgan also played quarterback in high school. Morgan was a Michigan Wolverines fan growing up, and he committed to Michigan in early February 2011.

College recruiting
Name	Hometown	School	Height	Weight	40^{‡}	Commit date
Desmond Morgan; ILB	Holland, Michigan	West Ottawa (MI)	6 ft 1 in (1.85 m)	225 lb (102 kg)	4.675	Dec 23, 2010
Desmond Morgan; ILB	Recruit ratings: Scout: Rivals: (78)					
Overall recruit ranking: Scout: 42 (MLB) Rivals: 25 (MI) ESPN: 24 (ILB)
Note: In many cases, Scout, Rivals, 247Sports, On3, and ESPN may conflict in their listings of height and weight.; In these cases, the average was taken. ESPN grades are on a 100-point scale.; Sources: "Michigan Football Commitments". Rivals.; "2011 Michigan Football Commits". Scout.; "ESPN". ESPN.; "Scout.com Team Recruiting Rankings". Scout.; "2011 Team Ranking". Rivals.com.

== College career ==
=== 2011 season ===
Morgan tweaked his hamstring at the end of training camp, which limited him early in the season. Morgan is credited with starting the second game against Notre Dame on September 10, however, he struggled with his hamstring in the rivalry game. Brandon Hawthorne started the next five games. After seven games and a bye week, Morgan replaced Hawthorne as the starting weak-side linebacker based on superior performance. In announcing Morgan's promotion to the starting lineup, head coach Brady Hoke said, "Desmond's got a great future. He's doing a lot of good things. We're excited about him." In his second career start on October 29, 2011, against Purdue, he had a team-high nine tackles. Morgan established career highs with 10 tackles in both of the final two games of the season: he posted 5 solo (including his only quarterback sack of the season) and five assists on November 26 in The Game against Ohio State and then he had seven solo tackles and three assists in the January 3, 2012 Sugar Bowl against Virginia Tech. For the season, he earned 2011 Big Ten All-Freshman team recognition from both ESPN.com and BTN.com as well as 2011 College Football News All-Freshman honorable mention honors.

=== 2012 season ===
Morgan missed the September 15, 2012, game against Massachusetts due to injury.

On October 13, 2012, Michigan designated Gerald R. Ford's former jersey, No. 48, as a Michigan Football Legend Jersey. Morgan was honored as the first recipient of the Ford legend jersey, switching from the No. 44 jersey to No. 48. He earned Academic All-Big Ten recognition in 2012.

=== 2013 season ===
In week 3, against Akron during a third down and 1 goal line stand, Morgan made a key tackle for a loss in the final 20 seconds to preserve the 28–24 win. In the fourth quarter of the fourth game against Connecticut on September 21, Morgan made a one-handed interception to preserve a 24–21 victory. Morgan was named Athlon Sports Big Ten Defensive player of the week.

=== 2014 season ===
He only appeared in the season opener for the 2014 Michigan Wolverines football team against Appalachian State before injuring his hand and missing the rest of the season.

=== 2015 season ===
Morgan was granted a fifth year of eligibility after the NCAA approved his medical hardship waiver. Through the first nine game of the 2015 season, Morgan was Michigan's leading tackler with 57 total tackles. Following the 2015 Big Ten Conference football season, he was an All-Big Ten honorable mention selection. He won the 2015 Roger Zatkoff Award as the team's top linebacker. He finished his career as a three-time Academic All-Big Ten honoree, and Morgan was also voted to the 2015 CoSIDA Academic All-District First Team selection.

== Professional career ==
Morgan went undrafted in the 2016 NFL draft. He joined the staff of the Wayne State Warriors as a graduate assistant for the 2016 season. The following season he took the same position with the Maryland Terrapins.
