= Mike Martin (defensive lineman) =

American football player (born 1990)

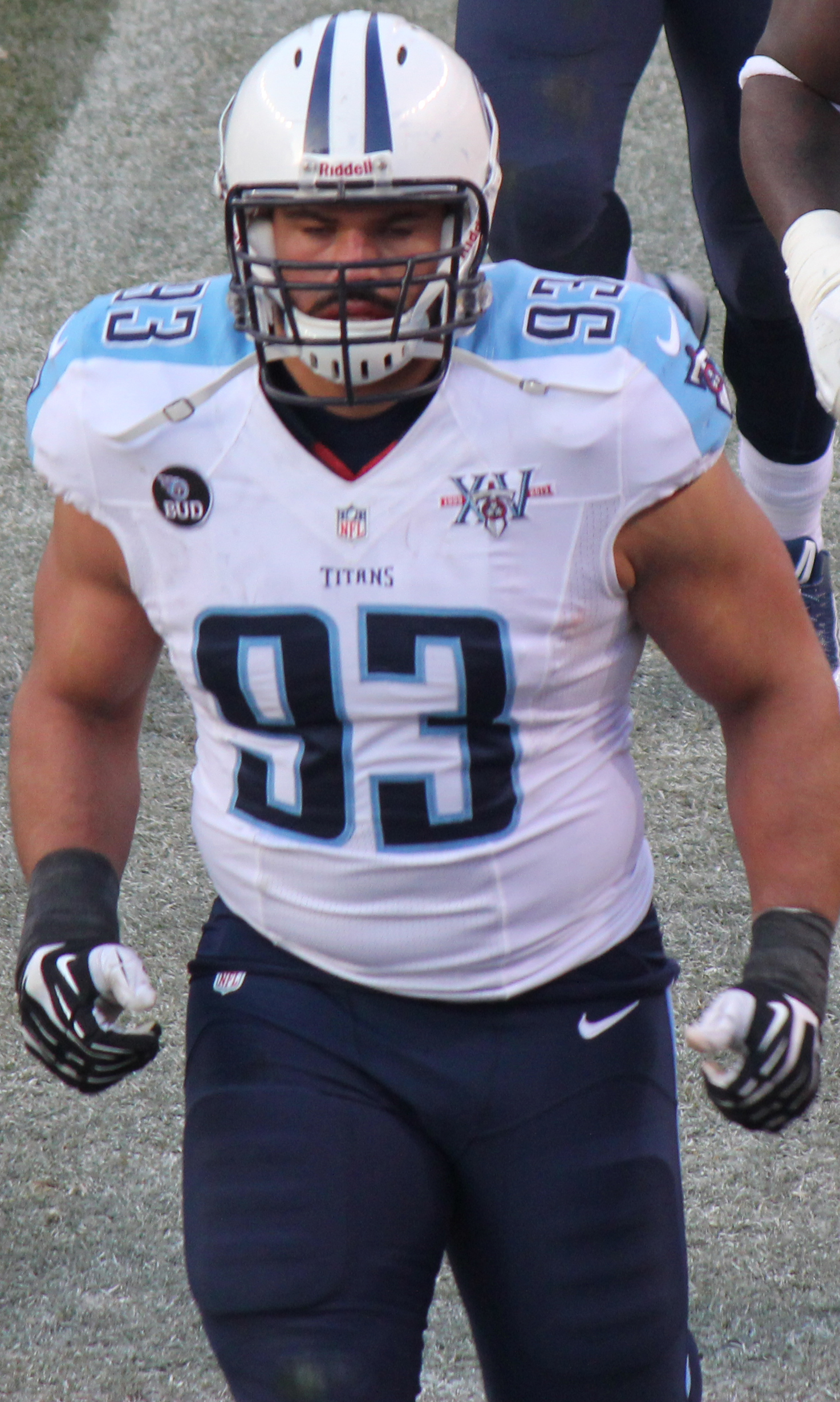
- Martin with the Tennessee Titans in 2013

No. 93
- Position: Defensive end

Personal information
- Born: September 1, 1990 (age 36); Detroit, Michigan, U.S.
- Listed height: 6 ft 1 in (1.85 m)
- Listed weight: 307 lb (139 kg)

Career information
- High school: Detroit Catholic Central
- College: Michigan
- NFL draft: 2012: 3rd round, 82nd overall pick

Career history
- Tennessee Titans (2012–2015); Philadelphia Eagles (2016)*
- * Offseason or practice squad member only

Awards and highlights
- 2× Second-team All-Big Ten (2010, 2011)

Career NFL statistics
- Total tackles: 68
- Sacks: 4
- Stats at Pro Football Reference

Michael Brendan Martin (born September 1, 1990) is an American former professional football player who was a defensive end in the National Football League (NFL). He was selected by the Tennessee Titans in the third round of the 2012 NFL draft. He played college football for the Michigan Wolverines from 2008 to 2011. At Michigan, Martin recorded 172 tackles and appeared in 49 games, including 37 games as the Wolverines' starting nose tackle. He was selected as a second-team All-Big Ten Conference player by both the coaches and media in 2011 and received the same recognition from the coaches in 2010. In high school, he was the state Gatorade Player of the Year in football. He was also a two-time Michigan High School Athletic Association (MHSAA) state wrestling champion as well as a two-time MHSAA state shot put champion.

== Early life ==
Martin attended Detroit Catholic Central High School in Novi, Michigan, where he was a multi-sport athlete competing in football, wrestling and track and field. In football, he recorded 206.5 tackles for Catholic Central and was selected as the Gatorade Player of the Year in Michigan for 2007. Though he only took up wrestling as a junior in high school, he won Michigan's Division I state heavyweight wrestling championship in both 2007 and 2008. He was also a two-time state champion in the shot put, and his 2008 throw of 63 feet, 9 inches came within three inches of breaking the all-time state record set by T. J. Duckett. As a freshman, Martin played alto saxophone in the school marching band during varsity games in addition to playing on the freshman football team. During his sophomore year, he was ranked as the No. 1 junior dog handler for the American Kennel Club. As a football recruit he was ranked as the 7th, 8th and 12th best defensive tackle in the nation by Rivals.com, ESPN, and Scout.com, respectively.

College recruiting
Name	Hometown	School	Height	Weight	40^{‡}	Commit date
Mike Martin; DT	Redford Charter Township, Michigan	Detroit Catholic Central (MI)	6 ft 1.5 in (1.87 m)	281.5 lb (127.7 kg)	4.8	Jun 5, 2007
Mike Martin; DT	Recruit ratings: Scout: Rivals: (80)					
Overall recruit ranking: Scout: 12 (DT) Rivals: 193, 16 (DT), 7 (MI) ESPN: 8 (DT)
Note: In many cases, Scout, Rivals, 247Sports, On3, and ESPN may conflict in their listings of height and weight.; In these cases, the average was taken. ESPN grades are on a 100-point scale.; Sources: "Michigan Football Commitments". Rivals.; "2008 Michigan Football Commits". Scout.; "ESPN". ESPN.; "Scout.com Team Recruiting Rankings". Scout.; "2008 Team Ranking". Rivals.com.

== College career ==
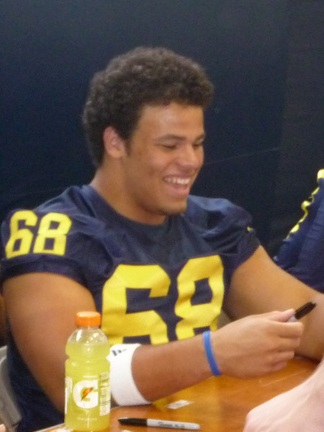
Martin at the 2009 Fan Appreciation Day during his college days.

Martin had been a fan of Michigan football since childhood and gave his oral commitment to head coach Lloyd Carr during an official visit in 2007. When Carr retired after the 2007 season, Martin withdrew his oral commitment and was heavily recruited by both Notre Dame and Michigan State. Martin renewed his commitment to Michigan in January 2008.

Martin enrolled at the University of Michigan in the fall of 2008 and played on the Wolverines' defensive line as a true freshman. Michigan head coach Rich Rodriguez said, "I don't know if I've ever had a true freshman defensive lineman, I guess, as Division I ready as Mike has been. He's going to keep getting better, so we're excited about him." Martin earned freshman All-American honors and led Michigan's freshmen with 20 tackles.

Martin has credited his wrestling technique with helping him against bigger opponents: "It's leverage; it's getting under a guy. Just knowing if a guy is on his heels or toes on the line, you're able to feel if he's on his base or not. In wrestling, that's a big aspect of it, because you've got to be able to feel the different motions of a guy." Martin has also credited wrestling with improving his foot and hand speed.

As a sophomore in 2009, Martin was the starting nose tackle (sometimes referred to as a nose guard) in all 12 games for Michigan. He totaled 51 tackles, 8.5 tackles for loss, and two sacks in 2009.

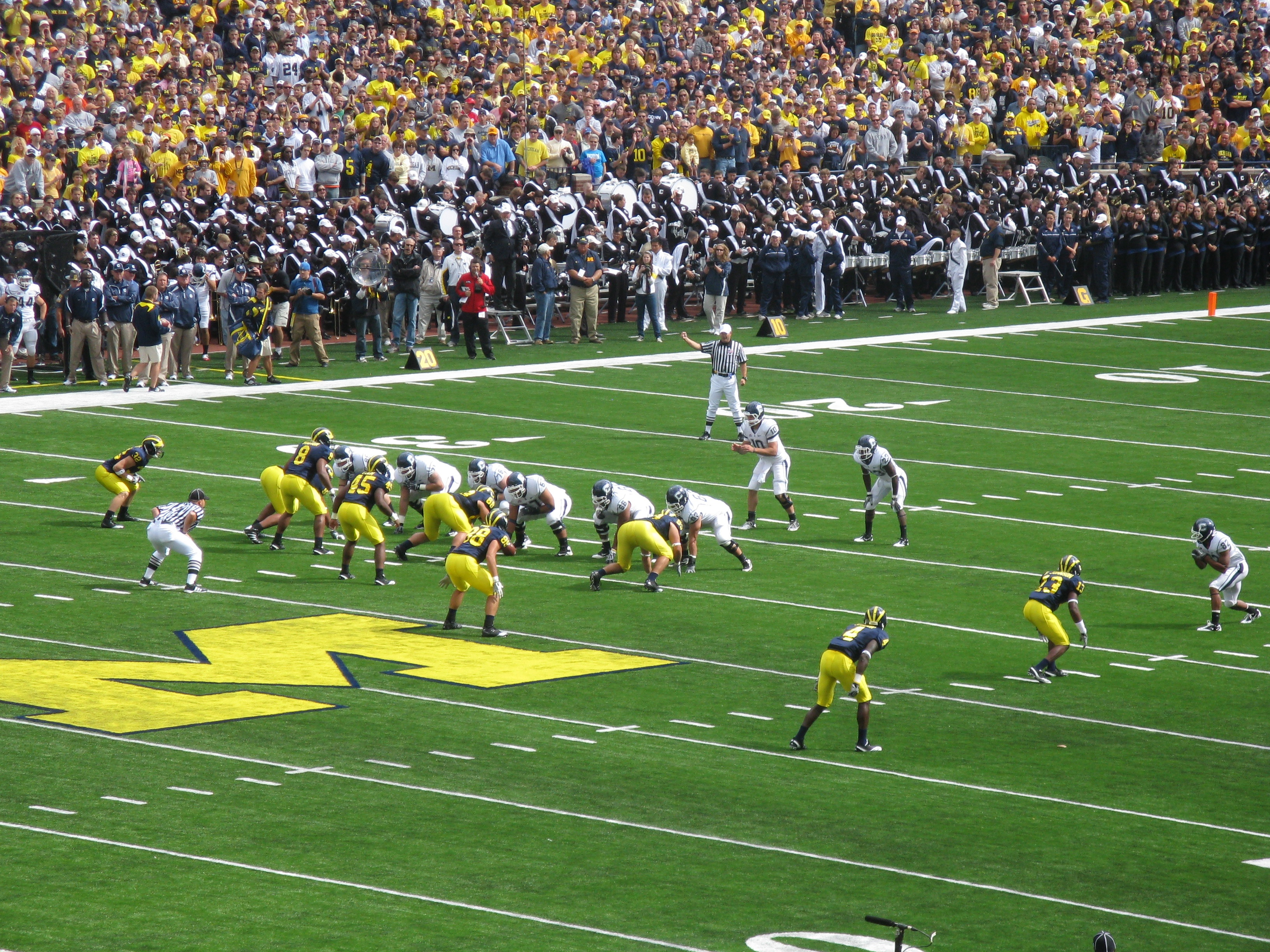
2010 Michigan Wolverines football team defense including #32 Jordan Kovacs, #8 Jonas Mouton, #68 Martin, and #88 Craig Roh

In the winter prior to the 2010 season, Martin underwent surgery to repair a shoulder injury that he sustained during his freshman year. At the start of the 2010 football season, Martin said he felt 110% following the surgery and added, "It feels good to play healthy."

Martin was selected by ESPN.com as one of Michigan's two "weight room warriors" for his 505-pound bench press and 700-pound squat. In 2010, Michigan linebacker Craig Roh said of Martin:

"Mike Martin is just an animal out there. He's the strongest person I've ever seen in the weight room. It's really showing on the field. He's taking on double teams. (Against Massachusetts), I think the play he sacked the quarterback, he beat a double team and sacked him. Which is — stupid."

Defensive end Ryan Van Bergen added, "He's so fast to get into the backfield. Credit that to his wrestling. I don't know how he can be so explosive and at the same time be moving his feet that fast. It's very unique. He's been unreal." Despite the poor performance of Michigan's defense in the first part of the 2010 season, Dave Dye of Fox Sports Detroit praised Martin's performance:

"Martin is the exception on a lousy Michigan defense. He gives the Wolverines a semblance of stability in the midst of utter chaos. Can you imagine where this defense would be without him? Frightening. He has been the MVP-NND (Most Valuable Player -- Not Named Denard). ... He is the team's quiet hero."

Following the 2010 season, Martin was selected as a second-team All-Big Ten Conference player by the coaches and received an honorable mention from the media.

As a senior in 2011, Martin had a career-high 64 tackles, including a career-high 10 tackles against Virginia Tech in the 2012 Sugar Bowl. He was selected as a second-team All-Big Ten player by both the coaches and the media after the 2011 season. Martin recorded 172 career tackles at Michigan. He appeared in 49 games during his four years at Michigan, including 37 games as the Wolverines' starting nose tackle.

== Professional career ==
=== Pre-draft ===
Pre-draft measurables
Height	Weight	Arm length	Hand span	40-yard dash	20-yard shuttle	Three-cone drill	Vertical jump	Broad jump	Bench press
6 ft 1 in (1.85 m)	306 lb (139 kg)	32 1/4	9 1/8	4.88 s	4.25 s	7.19 s	33.5 in (0.85 m)	9 ft 5 in (2.87 m)	36 reps
All values from NFL Combine

Martin was one of 30 defensive tackles and 58 defensive linemen that participated in the February 2012 NFL Scouting Combine. He ranked in the top four among defensive tackles in all six events. His 36 repetitions in the bench press ranked second among defensive tackles, second among defensive linemen, and third at the entire combine (behind Michigan teammate David Molk who was second with 41). His 40-yard dash time of 4.88 ranked third among defensive tackles. He ranked fourth among the defensive tackles and 13th among defensive linemen in the vertical jump with a height of 33.5 inches (85.1 cm). His standing long jump distance of 9 feet 5 inches (2.87 m) ranked first among defensive tackles, although that distance was only 14th among defensive linemen. He ranked third among defensive tackles with a 3 cone drill with a time of 7.19, which tied for 15th among defensive linemen. He was second among defensive tackles in the 20-yard shuttle with a time of 4.25, which placed sixth among defensive linemen.

=== Tennessee Titans ===
Martin was selected by the Tennessee Titans in the third round (82nd overall pick) of the 2012 NFL draft. Martin was the first player from the Michigan Wolverines to be selected in the 2012 Draft. He is one of three Michigan Wolverines and 41 Big Ten players drafted. After being selected by the Titans, Martin said: "Actually, I have really good family friends that live in Tennessee and in Nashville, so I've gotten a taste of Nashville a little bit, and I'm excited to explore it a little bit more—get to know the city and the people." Titans general manager Ruston Webster said of Martin: "He is what you want in a nose tackle. He is tough as nails, a grinder. He doesn't mind doing the dirty work and he brings the kind of mentality we want in our defense." On October 2, Martin was fined $15,750 for hitting Indianapolis Colts quarterback Andrew Luck.

=== Philadelphia Eagles ===
On April 26, 2016, Martin signed with the Philadelphia Eagles. On August 28, Martin was placed on injured reserve due to a knee injury.
