= List of killings by law enforcement officers in the United States, May 2019 =

This is a list of people reported killed by non-military law enforcement officers in the United States in May 2019, whether in the line of duty or not, and regardless of reason or method. The listing documents the occurrence of a death, making no implications regarding wrongdoing or justification on the part of the person killed or officer involved. Killings are arranged by date of the incident that caused death. Different death dates, if known, are noted in the description. The table below lists 72 people.

== May 2019 ==
Date	Name (age) of deceased	State (city)	Description
2019-05-31	DeWayne Craddock (40)	Virginia (Virginia Beach)	Craddock, the perpetrator of the 2019 Virginia Beach shooting, was killed in a prolonged shootout with police after he began indiscriminately shooting at workers in the Virginia Beach Municipal Center.
2019-05-31	Kyle Needham (32)	Maine (Gorham)	Needham was shot and killed by police.
2019-05-31	Jesse Sarey (26)	Washington (Auburn)	Sarey was shot and killed by police.
2019-05-30	Steve Huff (58)	Maryland (Havre de Grace)	Huff was shot and killed by police.
2019-05-30	Crystal Danielle Ragland (32)	Alabama (Huntsville)	Ragland was shot and killed by police.
2019-05-29	Isaac Ray Ruiz (22)	Texas (Amarillo)	Ruiz was shot and killed by police officers.
2019-05-29	Gerald Tremblay (62)	North Carolina (Wilmington)	Tremblay was shot and killed by police.
2019-05-28	Curtis Stagger (21)	Illinois (Chicago)	Stagger was shot and killed by police.
2019-05-27	Robert Sabater (49)	Kansas (Wichita)	Sabater was shot and killed by police.
2019-05-27	Nakia Smith (44)	Illinois (Joliet)	Smith was shot and killed by police officers.
2019-05-26	Terrance M. Bridges Jr. (30)	Missouri (Kansas City)	Bridges was shot and killed by police.
2019-05-26	Billy Wade Webber (48)	Texas (Odessa)	Webber was shot and killed by police.
2019-05-24	Carlvon Mayo (35)	Texas (Houston)	Mayo was shot and killed by police.
2019-05-24	Hamid Ould-Rouis (59)	Florida (Fort Lauderdale)	Ould-Rouis was shot and killed by police.
2019-05-24	Ryan Brett Thomas (41)	Florida (Indian River County)	Thomas was shot and killed by police.
2019-05-23	Fred Burton (56)	Kansas (Wichita)	Burton was shot and killed by police.
2019-05-23	Adam Michael McCoy (28)	Mississippi (Pearl River County)	McCoy was shot and killed by police.
2019-05-23	Luke H. Patterson (41)	New York (Montgomery)	Patterson was shot and killed by police.
2019-05-22	Myles Frazier (22)	Illinois (Chicago)	Frazier was shot and killed by police.
2019-05-22	David Marcus Reece (47)	South Carolina (Inman)	Reece was shot and killed by police.
2019-05-22	Joseph M. Tedrick (33)	Wisconsin (Ashland)	Tedrick was shot and killed by police.
2019-05-21	Christopher L. Brown (32)	Kentucky (Montgomery Creek)	Brown was shot and killed by police officers.
2019-05-21	Steven Case (29)	Maine (Auburn)	Case was shot and killed by police.
2019-05-21	Juan Antonio Sillas (21)	California (Tehachapi)	Sillas was shot and killed by a police officer.
2019-05-20	Micheal Ann Godsey (34)	Oklahoma (Blackwell)	Godsey was shot and killed by police officers.
2019-05-20	Carlos Javier Roman Santiago (46)	North Carolina (Archdale)	Police were dispatched to a location where they encountered Santiago, who was armed with a knife. An altercation ensued which resulted in the officer shooting and killing Santiago.
2019-05-20	Enosa Strickland Jr. (26)	Washington (Auburn)	Officers were called to an apartment complex for a possible domestic violence incident. Strickland first interacted with officers calmly, but eventually became agitated. A physical fight ensued with the officers, in which Strickland brandished a knife. Being unable to disarm him, police shot Strickland in the back of the head.
2019-05-19	Ronnie Churches (45)	Florida (Miami Gardens)	Churches was shot and killed by police.
2019-05-19	Lawrence Lee Lovato (46)	Colorado (Trinidad)	Lovato was shot and killed by police.
2019-05-19	Lori Markham (47)	New Mexico (Carlsbad)	Markham was shot and killed by police.
2019-05-19	Esteban Martinez (59)	California (Huron)	Martinez was shot and killed by police.
2019-05-19	Robert Rabago (17)	Arizona (Phoenix)	Rabago was shot and killed by police.
2019-05-18	Sean Michael Collins (29)	Colorado (Colorado Springs)	Police responded to calls of a domestic dispute when they encountered Collins, who was arguing with another resident of an apartment in the 4200 block of Forest Hill Road and then allegedly fired shots at responding officers. Officer Christopher Laabs fired shots during the hours-long standoff.
2019-05-18	Andrew Giovanni Meza (20)	California (Garden Grove)	Meza was shot and killed by police.
2019-05-17	Donald Davis Jr. (40)	Louisiana (New Orleans)	Davis was shot and killed by police.
2019-05-17	Luis Lomonte (39)	Florida (Davie)	Lomonte was shot and killed by police officers.
2019-05-17	Daniel Warren (36)	California (Pasadena)	Warren was shot and killed by police.
2019-05-16	Elizabeth Harris (58)	Texas (New Boston)	Harris was shot and killed by police.
2019-05-16	Michael Nieto (32)	Florida (Palm Beach Gardens)	Nieto was shot and killed by police officers.
2019-05-15	Ruben Houston III (47)	Wisconsin (Appleton)	Houston was shot and killed by police.
2019-05-15	Djuantez Anthony Mitchell (30)	Kentucky (Louisville)	Mitchell was shot and killed by police.
2019-05-15	Ronny Santana Rodriguez (43)	Florida (Tamarac)	Rodriguez was shot and killed by police.
2019-05-14	Alex Steward Underdown (54)	Nevada (Las Vegas)	Underdown was shot and killed by police.
2019-05-13	Malik Ali Gresham (36)	California (Gardena)	Gresham was shot and killed by police.
2019-05-13	James Douglas Meadows (45)	Maryland (Rising Sun)	Meadows was shot and killed by police.
2019-05-13	Pamela Shantay Turner (45)	Texas (Baytown)	Turner was shot and killed by police.
2019-05-11	Sharell Brown (26)	Illinois (Chicago)	Brown was shot and killed by police.
2019-05-11	Edward Fuller III (49)	Georgia (Savannah)	Fuller was shot and killed by a police officer.
2019-05-11	Paul Mcvicker (43)	Arizona (Parks)	Mcvicker was shot and killed by police.
2019-05-11	Jeremy Potwin (39)	Vermont (Tunbridge)	Potwin was shot and killed by police.
2019-05-11	Luis Quinones Rosa (25)	Nebraska (South Sioux City)	Rosa was shot and killed by police officers.
2019-05-10	Ronald Greene (49)	Louisiana (Monroe)	Following a high-speed chase, Greene was stunned with a taser and punched. After his hands were cuffed and his legs were shackled, he was dragged by his feet and left facedown for over nine minutes. Louisiana state troopers told his family that he died after crashing into a tree but later changed their story to say that he died on his way to the hospital. Footage from the troopers' body cameras was not released for over two years.
2019-05-10	Derrec Jamal Shaw (25)	Oklahoma (Tulsa)	Shaw was shot and killed by police.
2019-05-09	William R. Clark (31)	Virginia (Wytheville)	Clark was shot by police and died of his injuries on 2020-05-10.
2019-05-09	Eddie Herrera (49)	California (Montebello)	Herrera was shot and killed by police.
2019-05-09	Hector Lopez (29)	Arizona (Phoenix)	Lopez was shot and killed by police.
2019-05-08	Ryan Smith (31)	Washington (Seattle)	A woman called 911, saying her boyfriend had a knife and was trying to attack her. When officers arrived, they encountered a man with a knife and shot him, killing him.
2019-05-07	Francisco Anthony Alcaraz Jr. (32)	California (Santa Barbara County)	Alcaraz was shot and killed by police officers.
2019-05-07	Aubrey Manning (59)	Mississippi (Lumberton)	Manning was shot and killed by police.
2019-05-07	Cesar Tomix Sarmiento-Molina (34)	Wisconsin (Milwaukee)	Sarmiento-Molina was shot and killed by police.
2019-05-06	Pedro Colazo-villa (33)	Arizona (Mesa)	Colazo-villa was shot and killed by police.
2019-05-05	George Herrera (61)	New Mexico (Angel Fire)	As firefighters were leaving the site of a home fire that was under control, Angel Fire Police Officer Mark Fitch shot and killed the 61-year-old homeowner, who was allegedly armed with a knife.
2019-05-04	Jason Demarcus Larkin (35)	Arizona (Gadsden)	Larkin was shot and killed by police officers.
2019-05-04	Timothy Russell Majchrzak (37)	Minnesota (Hermantown)	Majchrzak was shot and killed by police.
2019-05-04	Ethan Austin Murray (25)	Washington (Spokane)	Murray was shot and killed by police.
2019-05-04	Saoun Pol (35)	California (Stockton)	Pol was shot and killed by police.
2019-05-02	Robert Uhl Johnson (76)	Maryland (Parkville)	Johnson was shot and killed by police.
2019-05-02	Jorge Albert Merino (37)	Texas (Cedar Hill)	Merino was shot and killed by police.
2019-05-02	David Wayne West (52)	Georgia (Glenwood)	West was shot and killed by police.
2019-05-01	Isaac Pineda (37)	New Mexico (Meadow Lake)	Pineda allegedly stole a gun and held his family at gun point, threatening to kill them. Police responded to the scene, Pineda let family leave the house. However when the officers ordered Pineda out of the house he exited with his rifle aimed at the police, to which they responded by opening fire, killing him.
2019-05-01	Reinaldo Gonzalez (51)	Florida (Miami-Dade)	A police officer responding to a call found 49-year-old Marays Morejon dead in her house from multiple stab wounds. The officer then encountered Morejon's partner, 51 year-old Reinaldo Gonzalez, holding a knife. The resulting encounter resulted in the police shooting and killing Gonzalez. It is believed that Gonzalez stabbed and killed Morejon in a domestic violence incident.
2019-05-01	Timothy Manuel (28)	Virginia (Hiltons)	Manuel was shot and killed by police.

== See also ==
- Death in custody § United States
- Henry A. Wallace Police Crime Public Database
- List of cases of police brutality
- List of countries with annual rates and counts for killings by law enforcement officers
- List of law enforcement officers killed in the line of duty in the United States
- List of law enforcement officers convicted for an on-duty killing in the United States
- List of shootings by US immigration agents
- List of police reforms related to the George Floyd protests
- List of unarmed African Americans killed by law enforcement officers in the United States
- Lists of killings by law enforcement officers
- Police brutality in the United States
- Police misconduct § United States
- Police riot § United States
- Police use of deadly force in the United States
