= Ryan Van Bergen =

American football player (born 1989)

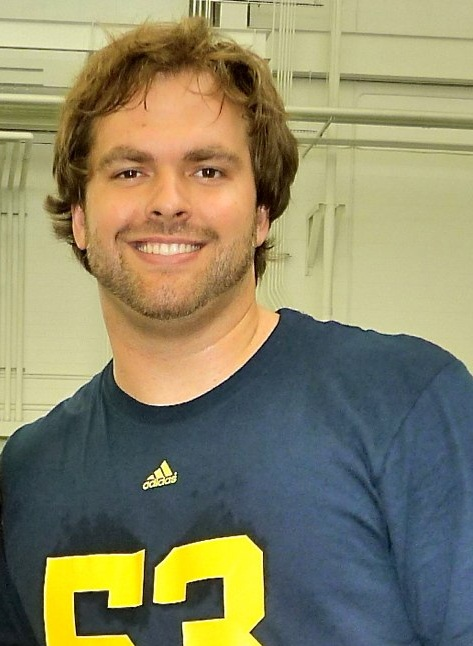

No. 53
- Position: Defensive end

Personal information
- Born: March 18, 1989 (age 37); Las Vegas, Nevada, U.S.
- Listed height: 6 ft 6 in (1.98 m)
- Listed weight: 288 lb (131 kg)

Career information
- High school: Shadow Ridge (freshman); Whitehall Senior (sophomore-senior)
- College: Michigan
- NFL draft: 2012: undrafted

Career history
- Carolina Panthers (2012)*
- * Offseason or practice squad member only

Ryan Charles Van Bergen, sometimes (mis)spelled Ryan VanBergen, (born March 18, 1989) is an American former college football player who was a defensive end for the Michigan Wolverines. He signed as an undrafted free agent with the Carolina Panthers following the 2012 NFL draft but did not make the roster for the team. As a fifth-year senior for the 2011 Wolverines, he was a preseason Hendricks Award watchlist candidate, and after posting at least two tackles for a loss (TFL)s in each of his final three 2011 Big Ten season games, he was recognized as a postseason honorable mention All-Big Ten Conference performer. He started at defensive tackle for the 2009 Wolverines before switching to defensive end in 2010. In 2011, he started at end, as well as tackle, and led the team in quarterback sacks and tackles for a loss. He was awarded the 2007 Detroit Athletic Club Michigan High School Male Athlete of the Year for his performances in football, basketball, and track and field.

== High school ==
Van Bergen attended Shadow Ridge High School in Las Vegas for his freshman year and started on the varsity football team. His family moved to Whitehall, Michigan for his sophomore season. He was the 2007 Detroit Athletic Club Michigan High School Male Athlete of the Year in recognition of his accomplishments in Football, Track & Basketball for Whitehall High School. He was a scholar in high school who maintained a 3.7 average and was a member of the National Honor Society.

In track, Van Bergen competed in the discus throw. He went undefeated during the regular season of his junior year and placed 13th at the 2006 Michigan High School Athletic Association (MHSAA) Division 2 Lower Peninsula State championships with a throw of 145 feet 11 inches (44.48 m) and 5th in the 2007 MHSAA Division 2 finals with a throw of 154 feet 7 inches (47.12 m). Entering the state finals he had been seeded 7th as a junior based on a qualifying throw of 155 feet 11 inches (47.52 m) and 9th as a senior with a throw of 151 feet 1 inch (46.05 m). He qualified with these throws as the MHSAA regional champion as both a junior and senior, while also placing in the shot put. Although Van Bergen only ran a 5.40 second 40-yard dash as a freshman, he got the time down to 4.89 prior to his senior season.

Van Bergen attended the 2005 and 2006 Michigan Summer Football Camps. He was ranked as the 8th and 18th best class of 2007 high school football defensive end by Scout.com and Rivals.com, respectively. Rivals also rated him as the 10th best high school football player in the state of Michigan. ESPN.com rated him as the 13th best tight end in the country. Van Bergen was originally a recruit of Michigan head coach Lloyd Carr.

College recruiting
Name	Hometown	School	Height	Weight	40^{‡}	Commit date
Ryan Van Bergen; DE	Whitehall, Michigan	Shadow Ridge (NV, FR); Whitehall (MI, SO–SR)	6 ft 5 in (1.96 m)	255 lb (116 kg)	4.85	Apr 4, 2006
Ryan Van Bergen; DE	Recruit ratings: Scout: Rivals: (78)					
Overall recruit ranking: Scout: 8 (DE) Rivals: 18 (DE), 10 (MI) ESPN: 13 (TE)
Note: In many cases, Scout, Rivals, 247Sports, On3, and ESPN may conflict in their listings of height and weight.; In these cases, the average was taken. ESPN grades are on a 100-point scale.; Sources: "Michigan Football Commitments". Rivals.; "2007 Michigan Football Commits". Scout.; "ESPN". ESPN.; "Scout.com Team Recruiting Rankings". Scout.; "2007 Team Ranking". Rivals.com.

== College ==
Van Bergen made one start as a redshirt freshman for the 2008 Wolverines on October 11 against Toledo. Following the 2008 season, Michigan had to replace three starting senior co-captain defensive linemen: Terrance Taylor, Tim Jamison and Will Johnson. Van Bergen started every game for the 2009 Wolverines at defensive tackle. He totaled 40 tackles, 6.5 TFs, five quarterback sacks, one fumble recovery, and four pass breakups as a redshirt sophomore in 2009. He also posted a touchdown on a fumble recovery against Wisconsin on November 14. His mid 4th quarter sack against Indiana on September 26, 2009, set up a 3rd and 23, a 4th down punt and the subsequent game-winning drive in the 36–33 victory.

As a fourth-year junior, Van Bergen started every game for the 2010 Wolverines at defensive end following the departure of defensive end Brandon Graham. He totaled 37 tackles, 8.5 TFLs, five sacks and one pass breakup in 2010. Van Bergen had two solo TFLs on November 13 against Purdue and three solo TFLs in the rivalry game against Ohio State on November 27. He achieved his first seven tackle (five solo and two assist) outing in the January 1, 2011 Gator Bowl against Mississippi State.

Van Bergen started at both defensive end and defensive tackle in 2011. He was a 2011 preseason watchlists honoree for the Hendricks Award. He was named the Big Ten Conference Co-defensive Player of the Week on November 14, 2011, for his 2.5 quarterback sack performance against the Illinois Fighting Illini on November 12. In addition to the two solo and one assist sacks, he had an assist on a TFL and achieved his second seven-tackle effort (four solo and three assist). Van Bergen also was recognized by the College Football Performance Awards as the national defensive performer of the week and defensive lineman of the week. The following week, he had two solo TFLs against Nebraska. In the regular season finale against Ohio State on November 26 he tallied seven tackles one more time (five solo and two assist), including a solo TFL and two assist TFLs. Thus, he concluded his Big Ten career with at least two TFLs in each of his last three regular season games. He was an honorable mention 2011 All-Big Ten Conference selection by both the coaches and the media for the 2011 Wolverines. Van Bergen finished among the conference leaders in several statistics: sacks/game (.42, t-9th), tackles for a loss/game (.96, t-10th) and fumbles recovered/game (.23, t-3rd).

== Professional career ==
Prior to the draft, the Houston Texans informed Van Bergen, that they were targeting him with their sixth round pick, but the team picked up two defensive linemen in earlier rounds (Whitney Mercilus and Jared Crick). Van Bergen signed with the Carolina Panthers minutes after the draft ended. Van Bergen's tweet actually came one minute before the National Football League tweeted Mr. Irrelevant. Van Bergen was informed by the Panthers late in the draft that "he was their No. 1 free agent target". Van Bergen was cut on August 31.

== Personal life ==
Van Bergen is known as a media favorite, according to AnnArbor.com's Kyle Meinke. He worked in maintenance in high school at Erdman Machine Co., an aerospace tool manufacturer. At the time of his induction into the Michigan High School Football Association Coaches Hall of Fame, he thanked several members of his extended family including his grandparents Cliff and Gloria Verschueren and Al and Doris Van Bergen. He also mentioned his brother Tyler, who was three classes behind him and went on to play football at Grand Valley State University. Tyler went on to anchor MHSAA regional champions in the 4 × 100 metres relay (2009) and 4 × 200 metres relay (2010). Their parents are Charles and Toni Van Bergen, from Hart, Michigan. His father, who was raised on a farm, is a retired United States Air Force veteran. Charles has eleven older siblings who are from the West Michigan region.
