= Greg Mattison =

American football player and coach (born 1949)

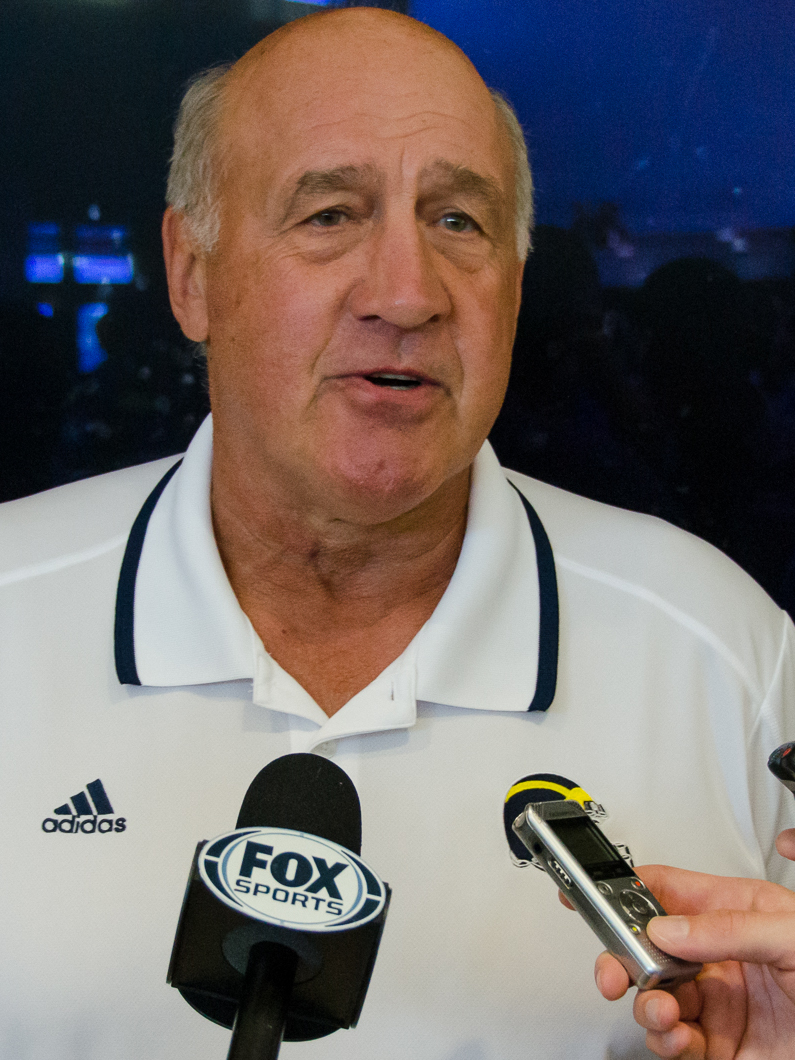
- Mattison in 2011

Biographical details
- Born: November 15, 1949 (age 76); Madison, Wisconsin, U.S.
- Education: University of Wisconsin–La Crosse 1971

Coaching career (HC unless noted)
- 1971–1973: Riverdale HS (WI)
- 1974–1975: Logan HS (WI)
- 1976: Illinois (GA)
- 1977: Cornell (DL)
- 1978–1980: Northwestern (DL)
- 1982–1984: Western Michigan (DL)
- 1985–1986: Western Michigan (DC)
- 1987–1988: Navy (DL)
- 1989–1991: Texas A&M (DL)
- 1992–1994: Michigan (DL)
- 1995–1996: Michigan (DC)
- 1997–2001: Notre Dame (DC)
- 2002–2004: Notre Dame (DL)
- 2005–2007: Florida (Co-DC/DL)
- 2008: Baltimore Ravens (LB)
- 2009–2010: Baltimore Ravens (DC)
- 2011–2013: Michigan (DC)
- 2014: Michigan (DC/LB)
- 2015–2018: Michigan (DL)
- 2019–2020: Ohio State (co-DC)

Greg Mattison (born November 15, 1949) is an American former football coach, and former player. He spent most of his career in college football as a defensive coach. Mattison coached at Michigan for eleven years, at Notre Dame for seven years, at Florida for three years, including the 2006 national championship team, and at Ohio State for two years. He also served as a defensive assistant for the Baltimore Ravens of the NFL.

== Coaching career ==
At Florida, he served as co-coordinator of the defense with Charlie Strong. Charlie Strong also served as assistant Head Coach and Linebackers coach while Greg also pulled double duty working as the defensive line coach. During this time he was a part of a successful defense and team that went overall 31–8 in games played and won a national championship by beating Ohio State 41–14 in the BCS Championship game in 2006.

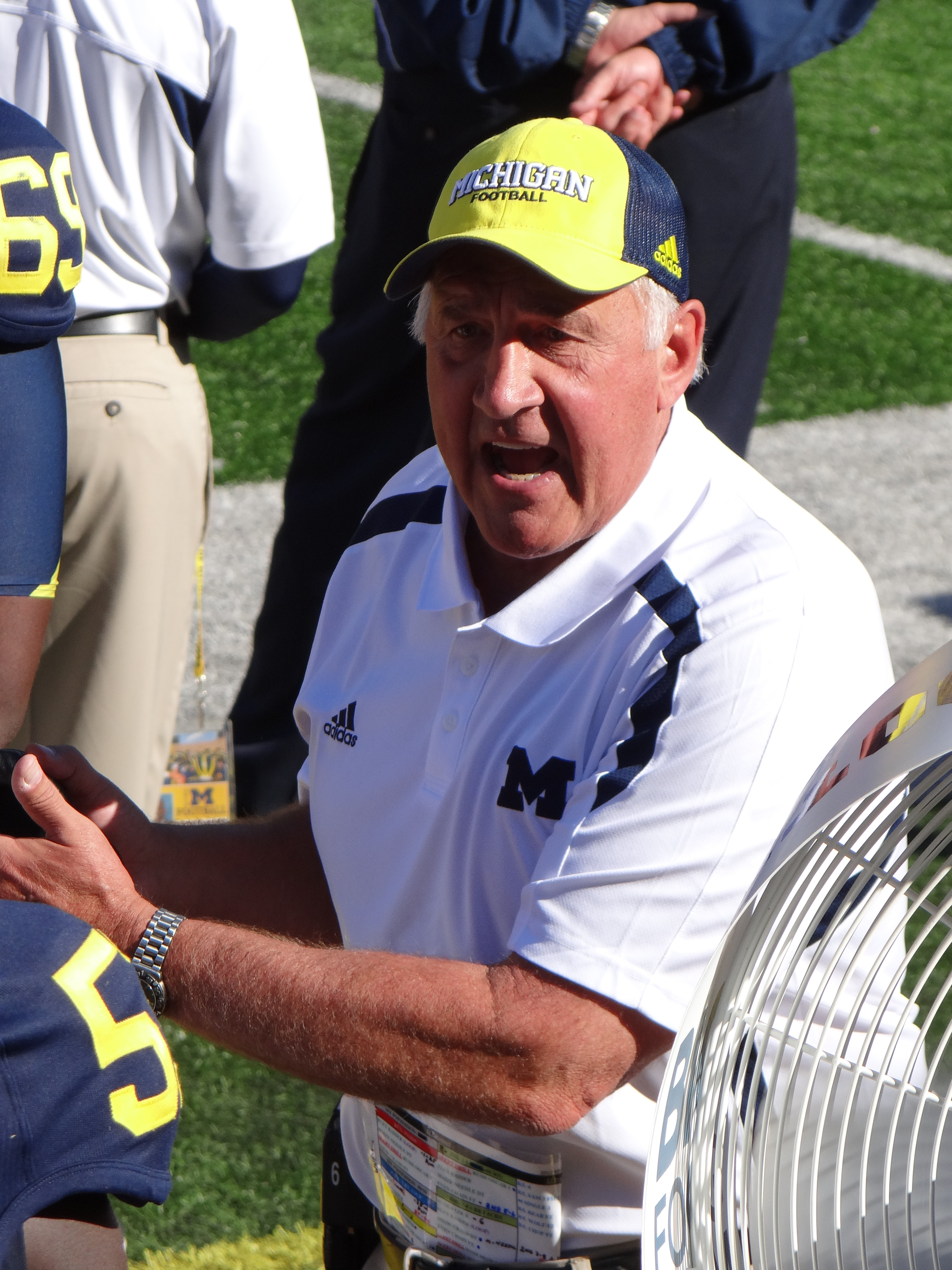
Mattison at Michigan, 2012

Prior to his time at Florida, Mattison coached at University of Notre Dame from 1997 to 2004 as the defensive coordinator under Bob Davie until the Ty Willingham era (during which he served as defensive line coach and recruiting coordinator). Prior to his time at Notre Dame, Mattison coached the defensive line at the University of Michigan from 1992 to 1996, while also serving at the defensive coordinator in 1995 and 1996. During his time at Michigan, the Wolverines led the Big Ten Conference in rushing defense four consecutive seasons, holding opponents to 78.6 rushing yards per game in 1992, 87.9 in 1994, and 88.1 in 1995. Mattison's charges also led the conference in total defense twice and scoring defense once. He also coached with Coach Davie at Texas A&M University from 1988 to 1991 while Davie was defensive coordinator. Under head coach R. C. Slocum, the Aggies featured the "Wrecking Crew", a nickname for one of the nation's top-ranked defenses.

On January 26, 2009, Mattison was promoted to defensive coordinator of the Baltimore Ravens; he was the successor of former defensive coordinator Rex Ryan. He was the team's linebackers coach, a job he got in part due to his relationship with John Harbaugh. During his time at WMU, Mattison coached alongside John Harbaugh, who was a graduate assistant and assistant coach. Harbaugh, then head coach of the Baltimore Ravens, hired Mattison to coach the Ravens linebackers. The job was Mattison's first NFL coaching position in 37 years of coaching football.

On January 18, 2011, the Ravens announced that Mattison had accepted the defensive coordinator position at the University of Michigan. In returning to Michigan, Mattison reunited with Michigan head coach Brady Hoke, who is a close friend of Mattison's and was the Wolverines' defensive ends coach during Mattison's previous stint as defensive coordinator at Michigan. His contract at Michigan made him among the highest paid college football assistant coaches in the country. He was selected as one of five finalists for the 2011 Broyles Award.

Mattison was a finalist for the head coaching job at Western Michigan University following the 2004 season, a job that eventually went to Bill Cubit. Mattison had served as the defensive coordinator and linebackers coach under Jack Harbaugh at Western Michigan from 1981 to 1986.

Mattison served as co-defensive coordinator at Ohio State for the 2019 and 2020 seasons. He shared the role with Jeff Hafley in 2019 and Kerry Coombs in 2020. Mattison retired from coaching following the 2020 season.

== Early life and family ==
Mattison is a graduate of the University of Wisconsin–La Crosse, where he played football and wrestled. He attended high school at Madison East High School in Madison, Wisconsin.

Mattison's son, Bryan Mattison, was a senior captain for the 2007 Iowa Hawkeyes football team, and most recently played for the Kansas City Chiefs, but was released on May 2, 2013. He was previously a member of the Baltimore Ravens and the St. Louis Rams.
