= Brad Herman =

American football player (born 1989)

No. 82
- Position: Tight end

Personal information
- Born: December 29, 1989 (age 36); Peoria, Illinois
- Listed height: 6 ft 5 in (1.96 m)
- Listed weight: 255 lb (116 kg)

Career information
- High school: Metamora Township High School
- College: Iowa

Career history
- New England Patriots (2012)
- Stats at Pro Football Reference

Brad Herman is an American former football tight end. He was born in Peoria, Illinois and moved to Metamora, Illinois in 2002 where he attended Metamora Township High School.

== School sports ==
In high school, in addition to playing football, Herman lettered in track.

During college, he played for Iowa Hawkeyes football.

== Professional football career ==
The New England Patriots signed Herman as an undrafted free agent following the 2012 NFL draft. Herman tore his Achilles tendon during practice on June 5, was waived, and was put on the injured reserve list on June 11, ending his playing for the season. On April 29, 2013, the Patriots released Herman.
