= 2010 Michigan Wolverines football team =

American college football season

2010 Michigan Wolverines football

Gator Bowl, L 14–52 vs. Mississippi State
- Conference: Big Ten Conference
- Record: 7–6 (3–5 Big Ten)
- Head coach: Rich Rodriguez (3rd season)
- Offensive coordinator: Calvin Magee (3rd season)
- Offensive scheme: Spread option
- Defensive coordinator: Greg Robinson (2nd season)
- Base defense: 3–3–5
- MVP: Denard Robinson
- Captains: Mark Moundros; Stephen Schilling
- Home stadium: Michigan Stadium

2010 Big Ten Conference football standings
	Conf.			Overall
Team	W		L	W		L
No. 14 Michigan State +	7	–	1	11	–	2
No. 7 Wisconsin $+	7	–	1	11	–	2
Iowa	4	–	4	8	–	5
Illinois	4	–	4	7	–	6
Penn State	4	–	4	7	–	6
Michigan	3	–	5	7	–	6
Northwestern	3	–	5	7	–	6
Purdue	2	–	6	4	–	8
Minnesota	2	–	6	3	–	9
Indiana	1	–	7	5	–	7
No. 5 Ohio State† %	0	–	1	0	–	1
$ – BCS representative as conference champion; % – BCS at-large representative; + – Conference co-champions; † – Ohio State (12–1, 7–1) self-vacated all of their wins; Rankings from AP Poll

The 2010 Michigan Wolverines football team represented the University of Michigan in the 2010 NCAA Division I FBS football season. Michigan played its home games at Michigan Stadium in Ann Arbor, Michigan and competed in the Big Ten Conference. The season was the first since the renovation of Michigan Stadium, begun in 2007, was completed. The Wolverines were led by third-year head coach Rich Rodriguez. After its week 10 win against Illinois, Michigan became bowl eligible for the first time since 2007, and later accepted a bid to play in the Gator Bowl against Mississippi State on January 1, 2011, losing 52–14. The Wolverines finished the season sixth out of 120 Division I FBS teams in total offense, 110th in total defense and 112th in passing defense. Michigan finished with an overall record of 7–6, 3–5 in Big Ten play. After the season, head coach Rich Rodriguez and his staff were dismissed on January 5, 2011.

Several individual players had standout performances. Quarterback Denard Robinson set several school records, became the first quarterback in college football history to rush and pass for 1,500 yards, and finished sixth in Heisman Trophy voting. He surpassed Drew Brees' single-season Big Ten Conference total offense record and the FBS single-season quarterback rushing record. He also won the 2010 Big Ten rushing title, the Chicago Tribune Silver Football for being the Big Ten's Most Valuable Player, and was named the Big Ten's Offensive Player of the Year.

Jonas Mouton was the Big Ten's statistical champion in tackles, while Jordan Kovacs finished second. In conference games alone, Roy Roundtree led the conference in receiving yards per game, in part on the strength of a school single-game record 246-yard outing against Illinois. Reserve quarterback Tate Forcier also set a school single-game completion percentage record with a 12-for-12 performance against Bowling Green. The defense also set several records, including most points allowed and yards allowed.

== Preseason ==
In 2009, the Wolverines started out 4–0, but finished the season 5–7 and missed a bowl game for the second year in a row. Michigan finished the season seventh in the Big Ten in total offense and ninth in total defense.

The team entered the season surrounded by questions of how they would overcome the late season collapse from last year and what it would take for Rich Rodriguez to return for a fourth year. On January 5, Michigan hired Dave Brandon to replace Bill Martin as its athletic director. Martin had previously announced his retirement during the 2009 season. Reaction to the hire was positive, but the hire also brought increased scrutiny upon Rich Rodriguez, as Brandon made it clear that he would do whatever was necessary to turn the program around from its recent slump.

The team also faced uncertainty relating to who would be the starting quarterback. While it was expected that Tate Forcier would retain his starting job, the build-up to the season led to a quarterback controversy that turned into a three-way battle between Forcier, Denard Robinson, and highly touted recruit Devin Gardner. On defense, Michigan installed a new 3–3–5 formation that the coaches hoped would better suit the players currently on the team. Michigan lost several key players from the previous season, including DE Brandon Graham, the 2009 Big Ten defensive Most Valuable Player, RB's Brandon Minor and Carlos Brown, LB Stevie Brown, and CB Donovan Warren. Michigan suffered a severe blow to its defensive secondary during fall practice, as starting CB Troy Woolfolk suffered a dislocated ankle that ended his season before it began.

== Recruiting ==
=== Recruits ===
College recruiting
Name	Hometown	School	Height	Weight	40^{‡}	Commit date
Richard Ash; DT	Pahokee, Florida	Pahokee H.S.	6 ft 4 in (1.93 m)	263 lb (119 kg)	4.85	Dec 16, 2009
Richard Ash; DT	Recruit ratings: Scout: Rivals: (77)					
Courtney Avery; DB	Lexington, Ohio	Lexington H.S.	5 ft 9.5 in (1.77 m)	164.5 lb (74.6 kg)	4.55	Jun 20, 2009
Courtney Avery; DB	Recruit ratings: Scout: Rivals: (73)					
Jibreel Black; DE	Cincinnati, Ohio	Wyoming H.S.	6 ft 2 in (1.88 m)	256.5 lb (116.3 kg)	4.8	Jan 22, 2010
Jibreel Black; DE	Recruit ratings: Scout: Rivals: (78)					
Drew Dileo; ATH	Greenwell Springs, Louisiana	Parkview Baptist School	5 ft 10 in (1.78 m)	175 lb (79 kg)	4.5	Apr 30, 2009
Drew Dileo; ATH	Recruit ratings: Scout: Rivals: (75)					
Demar Dorsey; DB	Lauderdale Lakes, Florida	Boyd Anderson H.S.	6 ft 0.5 in (1.84 m)	175 lb (79 kg)	4.35	Feb 3, 2010
Demar Dorsey; DB	Recruit ratings: Scout: Rivals: (85)					
Josh Furman; ATH	Millersville, Maryland	Old Mill H.S.	6 ft 2 in (1.88 m)	197 lb (89 kg)	4.38	Dec 21, 2009
Josh Furman; ATH	Recruit ratings: Scout: Rivals: (78)					
Devin Gardner; QB	Inkster, Michigan	Inkster H.S.	6 ft 4 in (1.93 m)	195 lb (88 kg)	4.57	Mar 12, 2009
Devin Gardner; QB	Recruit ratings: Scout: Rivals: (81)					
Will Hagerup; K	Whitefish Bay, Wisconsin	Whitefish Bay H.S.	6 ft 4 in (1.93 m)	212.5 lb (96.4 kg)	4.8	Sep 27, 2009
Will Hagerup; K	Recruit ratings: Scout: Rivals: (79)					
Stephen Hopkins; RB	Flower Mound, Texas	Marcus H.S.	6 ft 0 in (1.83 m)	222.5 lb (100.9 kg)	4.56	Apr 11, 2009
Stephen Hopkins; RB	Recruit ratings: Scout: Rivals: (77)					
Jeremy Jackson; WR	Ann Arbor, Michigan	Ann Arbor Huron H.S.	6 ft 3 in (1.91 m)	192 lb (87 kg)	4.65	Oct 1, 2008
Jeremy Jackson; WR	Recruit ratings: Scout: Rivals: (79)					
Carvin Johnson; DB	Metairie, Louisiana	Archbishop Rummel H.S.	6 ft 0 in (1.83 m)	185 lb (84 kg)	–	Nov 3, 2009
Carvin Johnson; DB	Recruit ratings: Scout: Rivals: (76)					
Conelius Jones; ATH	Spartanburg, South Carolina	Spartanburg H.S.	6 ft 2 in (1.88 m)	191 lb (87 kg)	4.47	Jun 15, 2009
Conelius Jones; ATH	Recruit ratings: Scout: Rivals: (77)					
Antonio Kinard; LB	Youngstown, Ohio	Liberty H.S.	6 ft 4 in (1.93 m)	210 lb (95 kg)	–	Jun 15, 2009
Antonio Kinard; LB	Recruit ratings: Scout: Rivals: (77)					
Ricardo Miller; WR	Ann Arbor, Michigan	Ann Arbor Pioneer H.S.	6 ft 2 in (1.88 m)	205 lb (93 kg)	4.50	Sep 29, 2009
Ricardo Miller; WR	Recruit ratings: Scout: Rivals: (80)					
Christian Pace; C	Avon Lake, Ohio	Avon Lake H.S.	6 ft 2.5 in (1.89 m)	259 lb (117 kg)	5.27	May 31, 2009
Christian Pace; C	Recruit ratings: Scout: Rivals: (79)					
Jordan Paskorz; DE	Allison Park, Pennsylvania	Hampton H.S.	6 ft 3.5 in (1.92 m)	224 lb (102 kg)	4.82	May 27, 2009
Jordan Paskorz; DE	Recruit ratings: Scout: Rivals: (78)					
Jerald Robinson; WR	Canton, Pennsylvania	Canton South H.S.	6 ft 1 in (1.85 m)	175 lb (79 kg)	–	Feb 9, 2009
Jerald Robinson; WR	Recruit ratings: Scout: Rivals: (77)					
Marvin Robinson; LB	Eagle Lake, Florida	Lake Region H.S.	6 ft 1 in (1.85 m)	190 lb (86 kg)	4.6	Apr 17, 2009
Marvin Robinson; LB	Recruit ratings: Scout: Rivals: (79)					
Davion Rogers; LB	Warren, Ohio	Warren G. Harding H.S.	6 ft 6 in (1.98 m)	207.5 lb (94.1 kg)	4.6	Jan 17, 2010
Davion Rogers; LB	Recruit ratings: Scout: Rivals: (78)					
Jake Ryan; LB	Westlake, Ohio	St. Ignatius H.S.	6 ft 3 in (1.91 m)	220 lb (100 kg)	4.6	Jan 18, 2010
Jake Ryan; LB	Recruit ratings: Scout: Rivals: (77)					
Terrence Talbott; DB	Huber Heights, Ohio	Wayne H.S.	5 ft 9.75 in (1.77 m)	224 lb (102 kg)	4.5	Aug 15, 2009
Terrence Talbott; DB	Recruit ratings: Scout: Rivals: (78)					
Terry Talbott; DT	Huber Heights, Ohio	Wayne H.S.	6 ft 3.5 in (1.92 m)	260 lb (120 kg)	4.83	Aug 15, 2009
Terry Talbott; DT	Recruit ratings: Scout: Rivals: (75)					
Ray Vinopal; DB	Youngstown, Ohio	Cardinal Mooney H.S.	5 ft 10.5 in (1.79 m)	181.5 lb (82.3 kg)	4.49	Dec 4, 2009
Ray Vinopal; DB	Recruit ratings: Scout: Rivals: (68)					
Austin White; RB	Livonia, Michigan	Stevenson H.S.	6 ft 0 in (1.83 m)	188 lb (85 kg)	4.51	Jul 15, 2009
Austin White; RB	Recruit ratings: Scout: Rivals: (77)					
Ken Wilkins; DE	Washington, Pennsylvania	Trinity H.S.	6 ft 3 in (1.91 m)	244 lb (111 kg)	4.61	Jun 9, 2009
Ken Wilkins; DE	Recruit ratings: Scout: Rivals: (77)					
D.J. Williamson; WR	Warren, Ohio	Warren G. Harding H.S.	6 ft 1.5 in (1.87 m)	173.5 lb (78.7 kg)	4.43	Mar 14, 2009
D.J. Williamson; WR	Recruit ratings: Scout: Rivals: (78)					
Overall recruit ranking: Scout: 12 Rivals: 20 ESPN: 14
Note: In many cases, Scout, Rivals, 247Sports, On3, and ESPN may conflict in their listings of height and weight.; In these cases, the average was taken. ESPN grades are on a 100-point scale.; Sources: "Michigan Football Commitments". Rivals.; "2010 Michigan Football Commits". Scout.; "ESPN". ESPN.; "Scout.com Team Recruiting Rankings". Scout.; "2010 Team Ranking". Rivals.com.

== Preseason award watch lists ==
Michigan began the season with five players listed on prominent watch lists. Junior Kevin Koger was listed on the John Mackey Award list for tight ends. Redshirt sophomore Roy Roundtree was listed on the Fred Biletnikoff Award list for wide receivers. Fifth-year senior Stephen Schilling was listed on the Outland Trophy list for lineman. Redshirt junior David Molk was named to the Rimington Trophy list for centers. Fifth-year senior Jonas Mouton was listed on the Butkus Award watch list for linebackers.

== Rankings ==
Ranking movements Legend: ██ Increase in ranking ██ Decrease in ranking — = Not ranked RV = Received votes
	Week															
Poll	Pre	1	2	3	4	5	6	7	8	9	10	11	12	13	14	Final
AP	—	RV	20	21	19	18	RV	RV	RV	—	—	RV	—	—	—	—
Coaches	—	RV	22	22	19	17	24	RV	25	RV	RV	RV	RV	—	—	—
Harris	Not released						24	RV	RV	RV	RV	RV	—	—	—	Not released
BCS	Not released							—	—	—	—	—	—	—	—	Not released

*Source: ESPN.com: 2010 NCAA Football Rankings

== Schedule ==
Date	Time	Opponent	Rank	Site	TV	Result	Attendance	Source
September 4	3:30 p.m.	Connecticut*		Michigan Stadium; Ann Arbor, MI	ABC, ESPN2	W 30–10	113,090	
September 11	3:30 p.m.	at Notre Dame*		Notre Dame Stadium; Notre Dame, IN (rivalry)	NBC	W 28–24	80,795	
September 18	12:00 p.m.	No. 16 (FCS) UMass*	No. 20	Michigan Stadium; Ann Arbor, MI	BTN	W 42–37	110,187	
September 25	12:00 p.m.	Bowling Green*	No. 21	Michigan Stadium; Ann Arbor, MI	ESPN2	W 65–21	109,933	
October 2	3:30 p.m.	at Indiana	No. 19	Memorial Stadium; Bloomington, IN	ESPNU	W 42–35	52,929	
October 9	3:30 p.m.	No. 17 Michigan State	No. 18	Michigan Stadium; Ann Arbor, MI (rivalry)	ABC, ESPN	L 17–34	113,065	
October 16	3:30 p.m.	No. 15 Iowa^{†}		Michigan Stadium; Ann Arbor, MI	ABC, ESPN	L 28–38	112,784	
October 30	8:00 p.m.	at Penn State		Beaver Stadium; University Park, PA (rivalry)	ESPN	L 31–41	108,539	
November 6	12:00 p.m.	Illinois		Michigan Stadium; Ann Arbor, MI (rivalry)	ESPN	W 67–65 ^{3OT}	111,441	
November 13	12:00 p.m.	at Purdue		Ross–Ade Stadium; West Lafayette, IN	BTN	W 27–16	50,260	
November 20	12:00 p.m.	No. 6 Wisconsin		Michigan Stadium; Ann Arbor, MI	ESPN	L 28–48	112,276	
November 27	12:00 p.m.	at No. 8 Ohio State		Ohio Stadium; Columbus, OH (The Game)	ABC	L 7–37	105,491	
January 1, 2011	1:30 p.m.	vs. No. 21 Mississippi State*		EverBank Field; Jacksonville, FL (Gator Bowl)	ESPN2	L 14–52	77,497	
*Non-conference game; ^{†}Homecoming; Rankings from AP Poll released prior to the game; All times are in Eastern time

== Game summaries ==
=== Connecticut ===
Connecticut at Michigan

Team	1	2	3	4	Total
Huskies	0	10	0	0	10
• Wolverines	14	7	3	6	30

- Date: September 4
- Location: Michigan Stadium
  Ann Arbor, MI
- Game start: 3:30 pm EST
- Elapsed time: 3:15
- Game attendance: 113,090
- Game weather: 57 °F (14 °C), Overcast, W 20 MPH
- Referee: Alex Kemp
- TV announcers (ABC/ESPN2): Sean McDonough, Matt Millen & Heather Cox

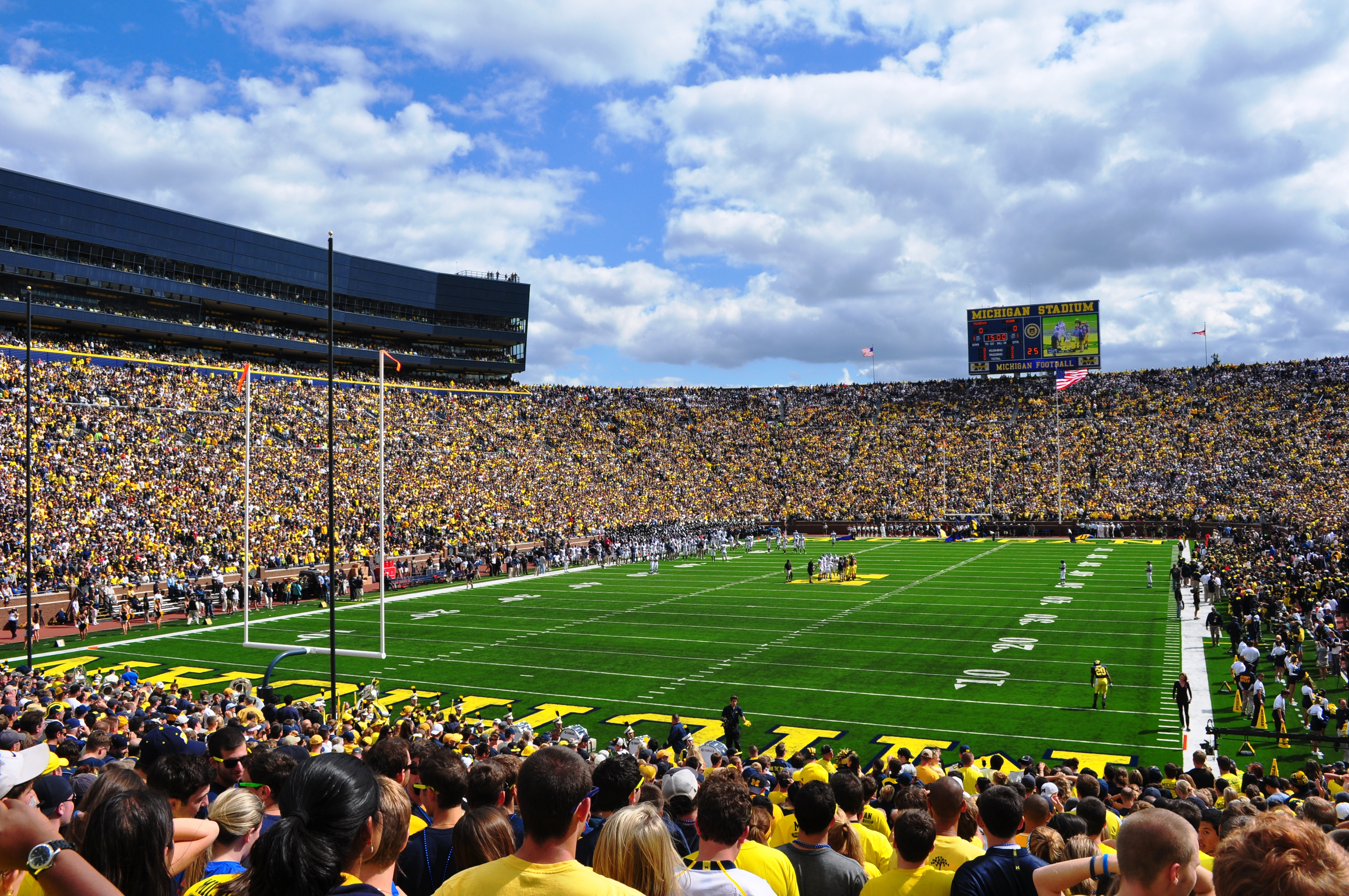
The newly designed Michigan Stadium

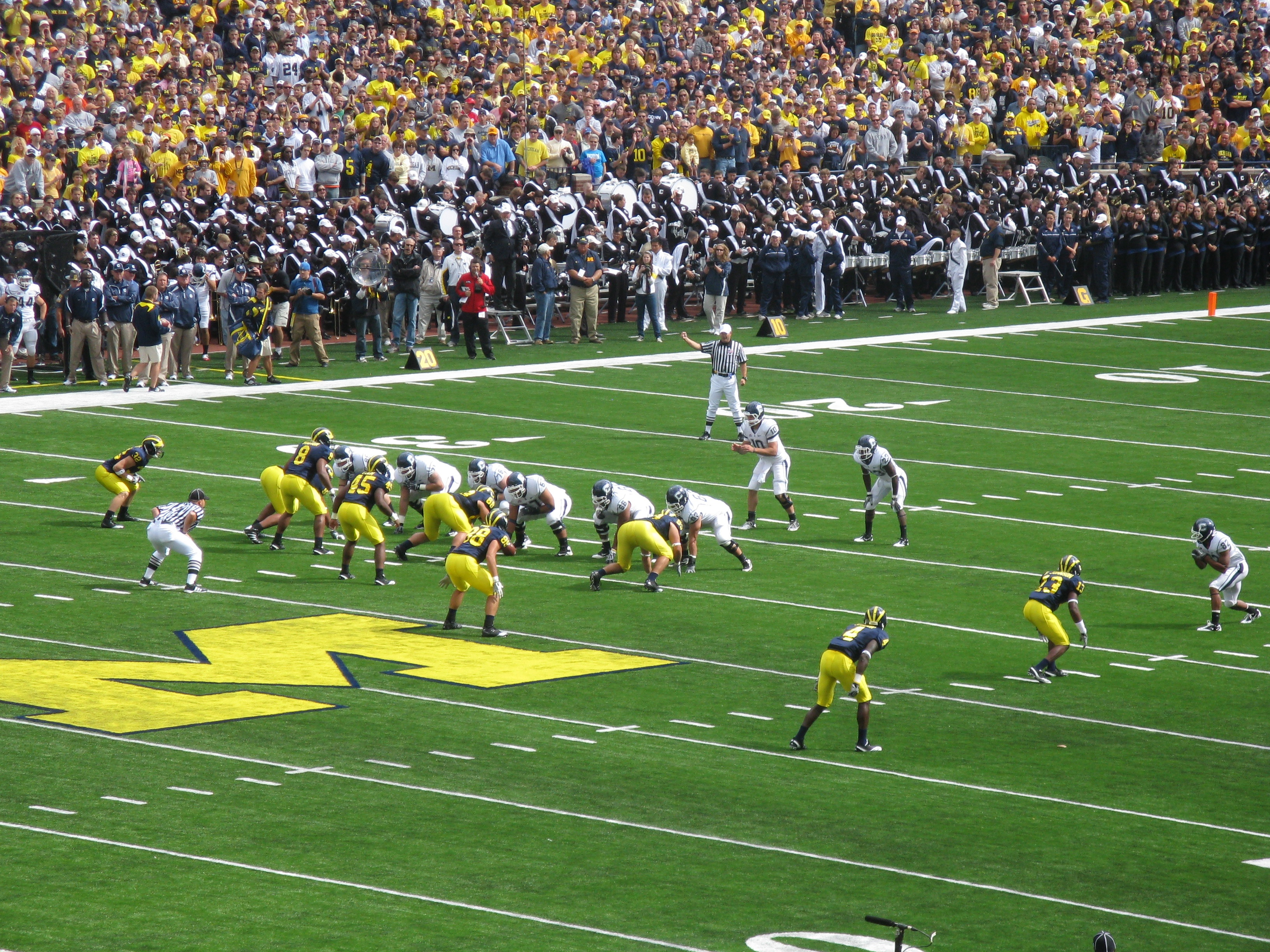
Michigan on defense vs. the 2010 Connecticut Huskies football team (including No. 32 Jordan Kovacs, No. 8 Jonas Mouton, No. 45 Obi Ezeh, No. 68 Mike Martin and No. 88 Craig Roh)

Michigan opened the 2010 season at home against the Connecticut Huskies, the first ever meeting between the two schools. Michigan celebrated the re-dedication of Michigan Stadium with a special flyover by a World War II era B-25 bomber from the nearby Yankee Air Museum in Ypsilanti Township, and then another flyover immediately following the national anthem by two A-10 aircraft. Brock Mealer—the brother of Michigan guard Elliot Mealer—led the team onto the field by walking to the banner and touching it, which sparked a standing ovation from the crowd. Brock Mealer had only recently regained the ability to walk following injuries in a car crash.

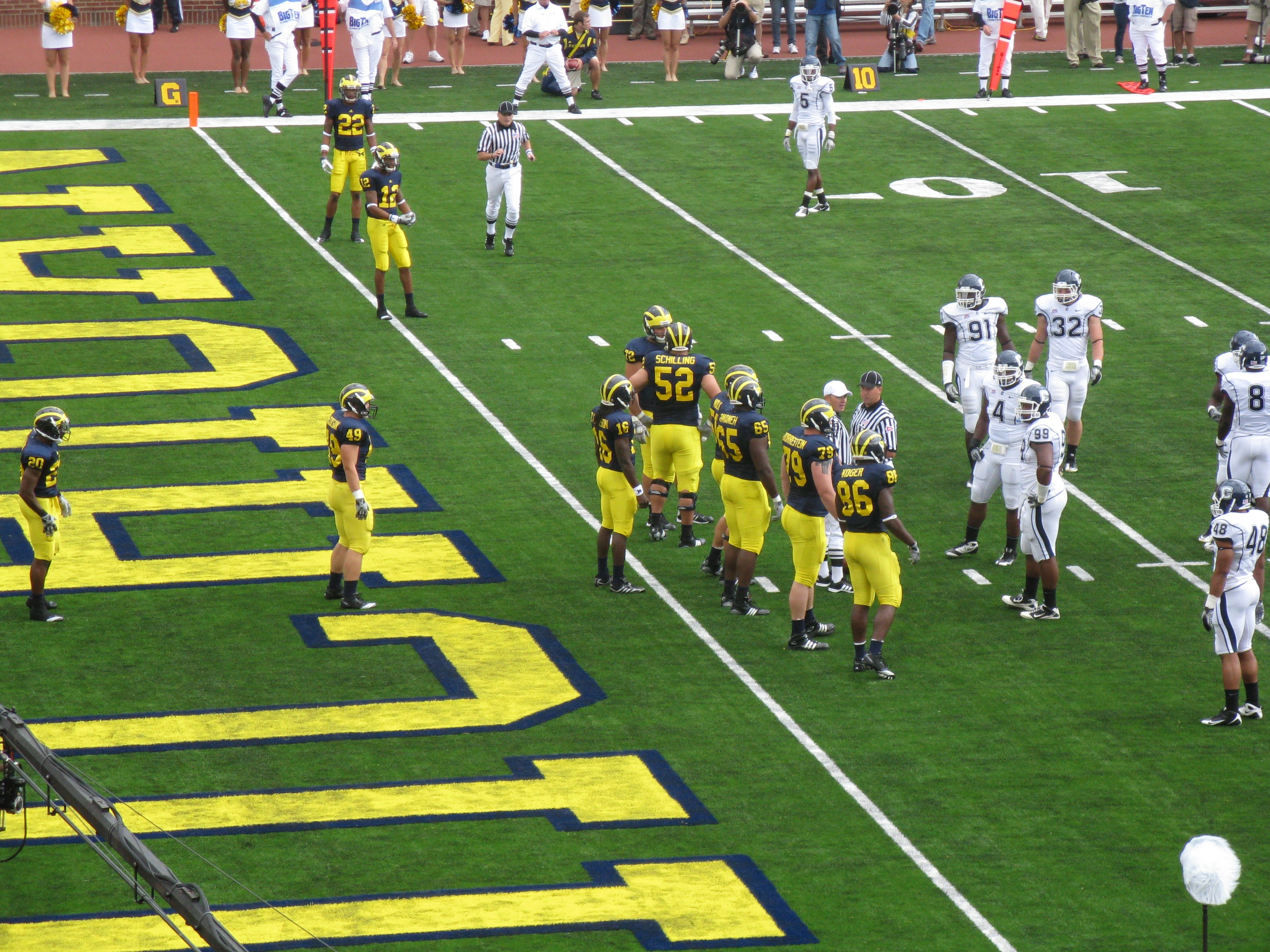
Michigan offense including No. 16 Denard Robinson, No. 20 Michael Shaw, No. 22 Darryl Stonum, No. 12 Roy Roundtree, No. 86 Kevin Koger, No. 52 Stephen Schilling, and No. 50 David Molk as well as No. 79 Perry Dorrestein, No. 65 Patrick Omameh, and No. 72 Mark Huyge

Although a close game was predicted, the game was the exact opposite, as the Wolverines finally displayed the long sought offensive firepower from a Rich Rodriguez offense. Michigan scored the only points of the first quarter, as Vincent Smith opened the scoring with a 12-yard touchdown run and quarterback Denard Robinson added another touchdown on a 32-yard run. Michigan started the second quarter with another touchdown, this time with a 3-yard run by Michael Shaw. All of Connecticut's scoring came in the second quarter: a 32-yard field goal by Dave Teggert, and then a 2-yard run by Jordan Todman. The only scoring of the third quarter came on a 24-yard Michigan field goal by Brendan Gibbons. Connecticut managed to enter Michigan's red zone during the third quarter, but D.J. Shoemate fumbled the ball after a hit by J.T. Floyd and Obi Ezeh recovered it to prevent Connecticut from scoring. In the fourth quarter, Smith caught an 11-yard touchdown pass from Robinson; however, the extra point attempt was no good.

The attendance of 113,090 was the highest in college football history. Robinson had 29 carries and completed 19-of-22 passes for 186 yards, contributing 383 of Michigan's 473 total yards. Robinson ran for 197 yards, setting a school record for a quarterback, surpassing Steve Smith, who rushed for 147 yards on four carries at Minnesota on November 12, 1983. Michigan committed no turnovers, the first time since the game against Miami (Ohio) on September 6, 2008. With the win, the Wolverines improved to 108–18–2 all-time in home openers.

=== At Notre Dame ===
Michigan at Notre Dame
(Michigan–Notre Dame rivalry game)

Team	1	2	3	4	Total
• Wolverines	14	7	0	7	28
Fighting Irish	7	0	10	7	24

- Date: September 11
- Location: Notre Dame Stadium
  Notre Dame, IN
- Game start: 3:30 pm EST
- Elapsed time: 3:37
- Game attendance: 80,795
- Game weather: 59 °F (15 °C), Cloudy, S 5 MPH
- Referee: Todd Geerlings
- TV announcers (NBC): Tom Hammond, Mike Mayock & Alex Flanagan

Following their win against Connecticut, the Wolverines traveled to South Bend, Indiana to take on their long-time rivals, the Notre Dame Fighting Irish, in their first road game of the season. Michigan won the previous year's contest on a Tate Forcier to Greg Mathews touchdown pass with 11 seconds remaining in the fourth quarter. The game was seen as a crucial test to Michigan's season, as it was Michigan's first game in a hostile environment.

Notre Dame began the scoring early in the first quarter with a 1-yard touchdown run by quarterback Dayne Crist; however, Crist suffered a concussion during the opening drive and was forced to miss the remainder of the first half. Michigan responded with three unanswered touchdowns. First was a 31-yard reception by Roy Roundtree midway through the first quarter, then a 1-yard run by Stephen Hopkins near the end of the first, and later an 87-yard run by QB Denard Robinson, the longest in Notre Dame Stadium history. After halftime, the Fighting Irish responded with two touchdowns and a field goal. First was a 53-yard pass to TJ Jones, followed by a 24-yard field goal by David Ruffer. Next was a 95-yard catch by Kyle Rudolph, which put Notre Dame ahead late in the game. Michigan retook the lead with 27 seconds left with a 2-yard run by Denard Robinson. Michigan's defense held off Notre Dame on its final drive of the game, with Crist's final pass sailing over everyone and out of the end zone.

Denard Robinson set a school record for total offense at 502 total yards – 258 rushing, 244 passing. The rushing yards set a new high for yards on the ground in one game by a Big Ten quarterback, as Robinson broke the league record of 217 yards set by Mike Kafka at Minnesota on November 1, 2008. Robinson became the ninth quarterback in NCAA history to rush and pass for 200 yards or more in a game, the last being West Virginia's Pat White against Pittsburgh on November 16, 2006 (220 rushing and 204 passing). The last 200-yard rusher for Michigan was Mike Hart, who had 215 yards against Eastern Michigan on October 6, 2007.

=== Vs. Massachusetts ===
Massachusetts at Michigan

Team	1	2	3	4	Total
Minutemen	3	14	0	20	37
• #20 Wolverines	7	14	14	7	42

- Date: September 18
- Location: Michigan Stadium
  Ann Arbor, MI
- Game start: 12:00 pm EST
- Elapsed time: 3:19
- Game attendance: 110,187
- Game weather: 65 °F (18 °C), Cloudy/Rain, SW 7 MPH
- Referee: Mike Cannon
- TV announcers (BTN): Tom Hart, Anthony Herron & Lisa Byington

After its dramatic win in South Bend against Notre Dame, Michigan played the Division I FCS Massachusetts Minutemen (UMass) in Ann Arbor, the first ever meeting between the two teams. Michigan sought to avoid an upset similar to the 2007 team, which lost to Appalachian State.

The game proved to be much closer than expected, and much more similar to the upset of 2007 than Michigan desired. On the opening drive, UMass drove to the Michigan 12-yard line, but was forced to settle for a 29-yard field goal. On Michigan's first possession, Denard Robinson threw an interception on the second play (and first pass) of the drive. After a defensive stop, Michigan drove 93 yards for a touchdown on a drive that featured passes of 16 yards to Martavious Odoms and 43 yards to Kelvin Grady. Michael Shaw scored the touchdown on a 1-yard run. Thirty-five seconds into the second quarter, UMass retook the lead on a 7-yard touchdown run by Jonathan Hernandez, capping a 67-yard scoring drive. Midway through the second quarter, Michigan drove 64 yards (including 40 rushing yards by Robinson), but Seth Broekhuizen missed a 38-yard field goal attempt. In the closing minutes of the first half, UMass drove 79 yards, capped by the second touchdown run by Hernandez. UMass led 17–7 with 1:17 remaining in the half, but Michigan stormed back in the final 61 seconds of the half. On Michigan's first play from scrimmage after the UMass touchdown, Robinson threw a 66-yard touchdown pass to Darryl Stonum with 1:01 left in the half. On the second play from scrimmage after the kickoff, Jordan Kovacs forced a fumble by Hernandez, and Michigan recovered the ball at their own 45-yard line. Michigan quickly drove 55 yards and scored on a 9-yard touchdown pass from Robinson to Stonum with 16 seconds left in the half. Michigan led 21–17 at halftime on the strength of 259 yards (195 passing yards and 64 rushing yards) of total offense from Denard Robinson.

On the opening drive of the second half, Michigan drove 69 yards and scored on Shaw's 34-yard touchdown run, his second touchdown of the game. On their second possession of the second half, Michigan drove 94 yards and scored on an 8-yard run by Robinson. The score marked Michigan's fourth touchdown in four drives as Michigan scored 28 unanswered points after UMass took the 17–7 lead. UMass scored on a 7-yard touchdown run by Havens at 13:47 of the fourth quarter. On Michigan's first possession of the fourth quarter, Shaw led the way with a 50-yard run and a 4-yard touchdown run to put Michigan ahead 42–24. UMass responded with its second touchdown of the quarter on a five-yard pass from Havens to Julian Talley, but missed on the two-point conversion attempt. After a three-and-out by Michigan, UMass blocked Michigan's punt and drove for its third fourth-quarter touchdown aided by a pass interference penalty against Michigan's James Rogers. With 2:05 left to play, and Michigan leading 42–37, UMass attempted an onside kick that went out of bounds at the 40-yard line, allowing Michigan to run out the clock for the win.

=== Vs. Bowling Green ===
Bowling Green at Michigan

Team	1	2	3	4	Total
Falcons	0	14	7	0	21
• #21 Wolverines	21	7	16	21	65

- Date: September 25
- Location: Michigan Stadium
  Ann Arbor, MI
- Game start: 12:00 pm EST
- Elapsed time: 3:16
- Game attendance: 109,933
- Game weather: 60 °F (16 °C), Partly cloudy, NW 20 MPH
- Referee: Dennis Lipski
- TV announcers (ESPN2): Bob Wischusen, Brian Griese & Quint Kessenich

Following its close win against UMass, Michigan hosted the Bowling Green Falcons. This was the first meeting between the schools since 2000, which saw Michigan emerge victorious 42–7.

After the opening kickoff, Michigan drove 80 yards for a touchdown on a 2-yard run by quarterback Denard Robinson. On its second possession, Michigan drove the ball 88 yards and took a 14–0 lead on a 47-yard run by Robinson. Michigan began its third possession at its own 9-yard line. Robinson ran 46 yards on the first play of the drive, but he injured his knee and did not return to the game. Devin Gardner substituted for Robinson and concluded the drive with an 11-yard touchdown pass to Jeremy Gallon. Michigan led 21–0 at the end of the first quarter, but Bowling Green scored 14 unanswered points in the second quarter on a 1-yard run by Jordan Hopgood and a 71-yard reception by Tyrone Pronty. With Michigan's lead cut to 7 points, Tate Forcier entered the game late in the second quarter. Forcier completed all 6 of his passes in leading the team on 69-yard touchdown drive to give Michigan a 28–14 lead at halftime.

On the opening drive of the third quarter, Bowling Green's punter fumbled the ball and it flew into the end zone for a safety, giving Michigan a 30–14 lead. After the safety, Forcier completed a 21-yard pass to Roy Roundtree, which led to a 2-yard pass from Forcier to John McColgan. On Bowling Green's next drive, Jonas Mouton intercepted a pass at the Bowling Green 46-yard line and returned it 9 yards to the 37. After a 14-yard pass from Forcier to Gallon, Vincent Smith scored on an 8-yard run to give Michigan a 44–14 lead. Bowling Green then drove 69 yards and scored on a 2-yard run by Jordan Hopgood. Michigan held Bowling Green scoreless in the fourth quarter and added three more touchdowns on runs of 1 yard by Vincent Smith, 5 yards by Fitzgerald Toussaint and 7 yards by Devin Gardner. Toussaint also had a 61-yard run in the fourth quarter to set up his touchdown.

Michigan's 721 yards of total offense rank as the second most in program history, trailing only the Wolverines' 727-yard effort against Delaware State on October 17, 2009. It is the most recorded by Michigan against an FBS program, surpassing the 715 yards tallied against Mississippi in the 1991 Gator Bowl. It was also the fifth-best total in Big Ten conference history. Tate Forcier set a Michigan single-game completion record of 100%, completing 12 of 12 passes for 110 yards and a touchdown. Michigan's three quarterbacks combined to complete 23 of 26 passes (88.5 percent) for 255 yards. This marked the first time Michigan had won its first four games in back-to-back seasons since the 1996 and 1997 teams.

=== At Indiana ===
Michigan at Indiana

Team	1	2	3	4	Total
• #19 Wolverines	14	7	14	7	42
Hoosiers	7	14	7	7	35

- Date: October 2
- Location: Memorial Stadium
  Bloomington, IN
- Game start: 3:30 pm EST
- Elapsed time: 3:16
- Game attendance: 52,929
- Referee: Dan Capron
- TV announcers (ESPNU): Pam Ward, Danny Kanell

To open Big Ten play, Michigan traveled to Bloomington, Indiana for a shootout with the Indiana Hoosiers. During the previous meeting between the schools, Michigan won the game on a controversial interception call which saw Donovan Warren intercept Indiana quarterback Ben Chappell on what turned out to be Indiana's final play of the game.

After the opening kickoff, Chappell led the Hoosiers on a six-minute, 77-yard drive capped by a 5-yard touchdown pass to Duwyce Wilson. Michigan responded less than a minute later on its second play from scrimmage with a 72-yard touchdown run by Denard Robinson. On its second possession, Robinson led an 85-yard drive concluding with a 32-yard touchdown pass to Roy Roundtree. On Michigan's third possession of the first quarter, Robinson completed a 74-yard pass to Roundtree who was tackled at the 1-yard line. However, Robinson fumbled the snap and the ball was recovered by Indiana. Following the fumble, Chappell led Indiana on a five-minute, 99-yard touchdown drive capped by a 22-yard touchdown run by Darius Willis. Michigan re-took the lead 21–14 on a 3-yard touchdown pass from Robinson to Kevin Koger with 2:43 remaining in the first half. The half ended with a 72-yard drive by Indiana and a 3-yard touchdown pass from Chappell to Damarlo Belcher as time ran out.

On the second play of the second half, Robinson threw a 70-yard touchdown pass to Junior Hemingway. Demarlo Willis tied the game at 28–28 with his second touchdown on a 4-yard run at the 6:55 mark of the third quarter. Michigan once again took the lead less than a minute later with a 56-yard touchdown run by Vincent Smith. The score remained 35–28 until the closing minutes as the defensive units held the offenses without a score for more than 20 minutes. Late in the fourth quarter, Chappell led Indiana on a six-minute, 80-yard drive. On fourth down with 1:20 remaining in the game, Chappell completed a 19-yard touchdown to Darius Willis to tie the game at 35–35. The Wolverines got the ball back at their own 27-yard line with 1:15 remaining in the game. Robinson carried the ball three times to take the ball to the Indiana 46-yard line and then completed a 42-yard pass to Hemingway who was tackled at the Indiana 4-yard line. Robinson ran the ball into the endzone for the winning touchdown with 17 seconds left in the game. It was Michigan's 17th consecutive win against Indiana, dating back to 1987. The victory also gave Michigan its first 5–0 start since the 2006 season.

Michigan totaled 574 yards of total offense against Indiana, with Denard Robinson being the team's offensive leader. He contributed 494 yards of total offense, the second-highest single-game total in Michigan history. With 217 rushing yards and 277 passing yards, Robinson became the first player in Division I FBS history to have two regular season games with both 200 yards rushing and 200 yards passing.

On defense, Michigan's performance was among the worst in team history. Michigan's defense gave up 568 yards in the game, the second-highest total ever allowed by a Michigan football team. With several sustained drives, Indiana also dominated time of possession, controlling the ball for 41:47 as compared to 18:13 for Michigan. Indiana's total of 41:47 also set an all-time record for time of possession by a Michigan opponent. Indiana quarterback Ben Chappell passed for 480 yards to break the all-time record for passing yards against Michigan, surpassing a 28-year-old record of 436 yards set by Northwestern's Sandy Schwab in 1982. Chapell also broke the all-time record by an opposing player with 475 yards of total offense. Indiana receiver Tandon Doss also had the second-highest receiving totals ever recorded by a Michigan opponent with 221 receiving yards and 15 catches.

=== Vs. Michigan State ===
Michigan State at Michigan
(Paul Bunyan Trophy game)

Team	1	2	3	4	Total
• #17 Spartans	0	17	14	3	34
#18 Wolverines	3	7	0	7	17

- Date: October 9
- Location: Michigan Stadium
  Ann Arbor, MI
- Game start: 3:30 pm EST
- Elapsed time: 3:10
- Game attendance: 113,065
- Game weather: 75 °F (24 °C), Sunny, E 7 MPH
- Referee: Bill LeMonnier
- TV announcers (ABC/ESPN): Sean McDonough, Matt Millen & Quint Kessenich

In week 6, Michigan hosted its in-state rivals, the Michigan State Spartans, for the coveted Paul Bunyan Trophy. This game was the 103rd edition of the rivalry. The game marked the first time since 1999 where both teams entered the game undefeated. Expectations ran high for both teams, as Michigan State came into the game ranked 17th in the AP Poll and 16th in the Coaches Poll, while Michigan entered ranked 18th in the AP Poll and 17th in the Coaches Poll. Michigan State was victorious in the previous meeting in the series, winning 26–20 in overtime after a 23-yard touchdown run by Larry Caper.

Although Michigan was able to score first, it was Michigan State that dictated the pace of the game. After Michigan's 34-yard field goal, the only scoring in the first quarter, Michigan State responded with a 61-yard rushing touchdown by Edwin Baker, which were the first points of the second quarter. Michigan took the lead a few minutes later with a 12-yard touchdown reception by Martell Webb, but the Spartans responded with a 41-yard rushing touchdown by Le'Veon Bell, and later added to their lead with a 38-yard field goal by Dan Conroy just before halftime. State built on their lead in the third quarter with 2 touchdowns: first a 41-yard reception by Mark Dell, then an 8-yard run by Larry Caper. Michigan's only points of the second half came on a 4-yard rushing touchdown by Denard Robinson. Michigan State sealed their win with a 28-yard field goal midway through the fourth quarter.

Denard Robinson had perhaps his worst game up to this point in the season: he threw three interceptions and was held to only 84 yards rushing. This marked the first time that Michigan State had defeated Michigan three years in a row since they accomplished this feat from 1965 to 1967. The announced crowd of 113,065 was, at the time, the second largest crowd ever at Michigan Stadium. As a testament to Michigan's ongoing kicking woes, the field goal in the first half was Michigan's first attempt since the game against UMass and the first converted kick since the game against Connecticut.

=== Vs. Iowa ===
Iowa at Michigan
(Homecoming game)

Team	1	2	3	4	Total
• #15 Hawkeyes	7	14	7	10	38
Wolverines	7	0	0	21	28

- Date: October 16
- Location: Michigan Stadium
  Ann Arbor, MI
- Game start: 3:30 pm EST
- Elapsed time: 3:23
- Game attendance: 112,784
- Game weather: 65 °F (18 °C), Mostly Sunny, W 10 MPH
- Referee: Dave Witvoet
- TV announcers (ABC/ESPN): Ron Franklin, Ed Cunningham

For their Homecoming, Michigan hosted the Iowa Hawkeyes. Michigan hoped to bounce back after a tough loss the previous week to Michigan State. During the previous meeting between the two schools, Iowa prevailed 30–28 after Denard Robinson threw an interception with less than one minute remaining in the game.

While Michigan came out and scored on their first possession, Iowa went on to control the game and emerge victorious. After Michigan took an early lead midway through the first quarter with an 8-yard touchdown reception by Vincent Smith, Iowa tied it up a few minutes later with a 14-yard reception by Derrell Johnson-Koulianos. A few minutes later Johnson-Koulianos caught another touchdown, this time from 31 yards out. Iowa scored again just before halftime with a 4-yard run by Adam Robinson. In the third quarter Adam Robinson of the Hawkeyes ran in another touchdown, this time from 11 yards out. In the fourth quarter Michigan's offense woke back up, with the Wolverines' Stephen Hopkins scoring on a 2-yard touchdown run. Iowa responded with a 19-yard reception by Johnson-Koulianos. Michigan responded with 2 touchdowns: a 45-yard reception by Junior Hemingway, and a 3-yard run by Tate Forcier. However, Iowa sealed its win with a 30-yard field goal by Michael Meyer.

Michigan's rushing touchdown in the fourth quarter snapped a streak of 24 quarters where Iowa hadn't allowed a rushing touchdown (dating back to the Orange Bowl vs. Georgia Tech). With his rushing performance, Denard Robinson surpassed 1,000 rushing yards for the season, becoming just the second Big Ten quarterback to accomplish the feat in conference history. Indiana's Antwaan Randle El established the Big Ten record for rushing yards by a quarterback (1,270) in 2000. Robinson ended the contest with 1,096 rushing yards on the year.

=== At Penn State ===
Michigan at Penn State

Team	1	2	3	4	Total
Wolverines	7	3	14	7	31
• Nittany Lions	14	14	10	3	41

- Date: October 30
- Location: Beaver Stadium
  University Park, PA
- Game start: 8:00 pm EST
- Elapsed time: 3:13
- Game attendance: 108,539
- Game weather: 51 °F (11 °C), Clear, SSW 11 MPH
- Referee: Scott McElwee
- TV announcers (ESPN): Brad Nessler, Todd Blackledge & Holly Rowe

In week 9, and after a bye week, Michigan traveled to State College, Pennsylvania to take on the Penn State Nittany Lions. This game was seen as an important game in Michigan's season, as it was a nationally broadcast primetime game and allowed Michigan a chance for redemption after two consecutive losses. Michigan entered the game needing just one win to become bowl eligible, while Penn State's head coach Joe Paterno entered the game in search of his 399th career win. During the week leading up to the game, Penn State was unsure of starting quarterback Robert Bolden's status for the game due to a head injury suffered during the previous week's game against Minnesota. It was later announced that former walk-on Matt McGloin would start the game for Penn State. Michigan lost to Penn State the previous year by a score of 35–10, which was Penn State's first win at Michigan Stadium since 1996.

Penn State opened the scoring with a 4-yard run by Evan Royster, but Michigan responded with a 32-yard run by Denard Robinson. Penn State broke the tie with a 1-yard run by Evan Royster. Michigan responded in the second quarter with a 37-yard field goal, but Penn State scored two touchdowns just before halftime: a 1-yard run by McGloin and then a 20-yard run by Graham Zug. After the break, Penn State kicked a 32-yard field goal. Michigan responded with a 60-yard touchdown pass to Kevin Koger, but Penn State answered with a 5-yard run by Mike Zordich. Michigan countered late in the third with a 1-yard run by Denard Robinson. Robinson then ran in a 4-yard touchdown in the fourth, but Penn State sealed its win with a 42-yard field goal.

Robinson set the Big Ten season record for rushing yards by a quarterback with his 191-yard performance. At this point in the season, he had 1,287 yards rushing, surpassing the previous record of 1,270 yards set by Indiana's Antwaan Randle El in 2000.

=== Vs. Illinois ===
Illinois at Michigan

Team	1	2	3	4	OT	2OT	3OT	Total
Fighting Illini	6	25	0	14	7	7	6	65
• Wolverines	7	24	7	7	7	7	8	67

- Date: November 6
- Location: Michigan Stadium
  Ann Arbor, MI
- Game start: 12:00 pm EST
- Elapsed time: 3:51
- Game attendance: 111,441
- Game weather: 45 °F (7 °C), Mostly cloudy, NW 7 MPH
- Referee: Dave Witvoet
- TV announcers (ESPN): Bob Wischusen, Brian Griese

Scoring summary
1	14:46	MICH	Roy Roundtree 75 yard pass from Denard Robinson (Seth Broekhuizen kick)	Michigan 7–0
1	8:56	ILL	Derek Dimke 44 yard field goal	Michigan 7–3
1	2:57	ILL	Derek Dimke 43 yard field goal	Michigan 7–6
2	14:57	ILL	Nathan Scheelhaase 2 yard run (Ryan Lankford pass from Nathan Scheelhaase)	Illinois 14–7
2	12:36	MICH	Roy Roundtree 33 yard pass from Denard Robinson (Seth Broekhuisen kick)	Tie 14–14
2	11:55	ILL	Jason Ford 62 yard run (Derek Dimke kick)	Illinois 21–14
2	6:56	MICH	Stephen Hopkins 4 yard run (Seth Broekhuizen kick)	Tie 21–21
2	3:01	MICH	Junior Hemingway 45 yard pass from Denard Robinson (Seth Broekhuizen kick)	Michigan 28–21
2	1:11	ILL	Ryan Lankford 33 yard pass from Nathan Scheelhaase (Derek Dimke kick)	Tie 28–28
2	:37	MICH	Seth Broekhuizen 35 yard field goal	Michigan 31–28
2	:03	ILL	Derek Dimke 43 yard field goal	Tie 31–31
3	7:36	MICH	Michael Shaw 18 yard run (Derek Broekhuizen kick)	Michigan 38–31
4	14:55	ILL	Mikel Leshoure 27 yard pass from Nathan Scheelhaase (Derek Dimke kick)	Tie 38–38
4	11:35	ILL	Mikel Leshoure 1 yard run (Derek Dimke kick)	Illinois 45–38
4	1:47	MICH	Daryl Stonum 9 yard pass from Tate Forcier (Seth Broekhuizen kick)	Tie 45–45
OT		MICH	Michael Shaw 5 yard run (Seth Broekhuizen kick)	Michigan 52–45
OT		ILL	Mikel Leshoure 1 yard run (Derek Dimke kick)	Tie 52–52
2OT		ILL	Mikel Leshoure 25 yard pass from Nathan Scheelhaase (Derek Dimke kick)	Illinois 59–52
2OT		MICH	Junior Hemingway 9 yard pass from Tate Forcier (Seth Broekhuizen kick)	Tie 59–59
3OT		MICH	Michael Shaw 1 yard run (Junior Hemingway pass from Tate Forcier)	Michigan 67–59
3OT		ILL	Mikel Leshoure 3 yard run (pass failed)	Michigan 67–65

In week 10, Michigan hosted the Illinois Fighting Illini in a triple overtime shootout. The previous year's contest saw Illinois emerge victorious, winning by a score of 38–13.

The game began with an auspicious start for Michigan, as they scored on the first play of the game from scrimmage with a 75-yard touchdown reception by Roy Roundtree. Illinois responded with two field goals by Derek Dimke: first from 43 yards, and then from 44 yards out. In the second quarter, Illinois took the lead with a touchdown yard run by Nathan Scheelhaase, and completed a 2-point conversion to Ryan Lankford. Michigan tied it up with a 33-yard reception by Roy Roundtree. Illinois retook the lead with a 62-yard reception by Jason Ford. Michigan tied it back up with a 4-yard run by Stephen Hopkins, and took the lead back with a 45-yard reception by Junior Hemingway. The first half ended with 2 field goals that left the game tied: a 35-yard Michigan field goal, and a 43-yard Illinois field goal. Contrary to the explosive nature of the first half, the third quarter was relatively quiet, with the only scoring being an 18-yard run by Michigan's Michael Shaw. The fourth quarter saw a reemergence of offense, as Illinois tied it back up with a 27-yard reception by Mikel Leshoure and then took the lead with a 1-yard run by Leshoure. Michigan was able to tie the game late with a 9-yard catch by Darryl Stonum. Illinois chose to run out the clock, taking it to overtime. In the first overtime, Michigan got the ball first and Michael Shaw ran in a 5-yard touchdown. Mikel Leshoure then ran in a 1-yard touchdown, forcing double overtime. Illinois received the ball to start the second overtime, and Mikel Leshoure caught a 25-yard touchdown on the first play. Junior Hemingway then caught a 9-yard touchdown, forcing triple overtime. Michigan got the ball first to start the third overtime and scored on a 1-yard run by Michael Shaw. By rule, the Wolverines had to go for a 2-point conversion, which they completed with a pass to Junior Hemingway. Illinois' Mikel Leshoure ran in a 3-yard touchdown, but the 2-point conversion attempt failed, giving Michigan the win.

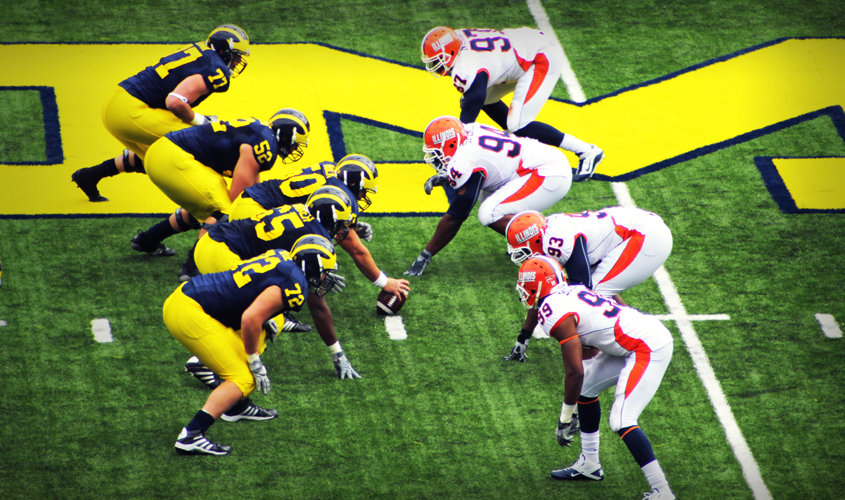
Michigan vs. Illinois, 2010

The high scoring game set several school and conference records: the 132-point combined score was the highest-scoring game of the year in major college football (so far), and the highest in both the 131-year history of Michigan football and in the history of the Big Ten. The Illini's 65 points were the most ever allowed by Michigan. They also established Michigan records for combined points in a half (62) and combined points in a quarter (49). Michigan's previous records in those categories were: 130 points (vs. West Virginia, 1904), 55 points (vs. Chicago, 1939) and 39 points (vs. Penn State, 2005), respectively. This game was the highest scoring FBS game since Navy and North Texas met on November 10, 2007, which Navy won 74–62. Robinson threw a career-high 305 yards, as well as a school record 262 yards in the first half. Michigan's 419 passing yards broke the previous single game record of 396 yards, which was set against Michigan State in 1999. Roy Roundtree had a school-record 246 yards receiving, breaking the previous mark of 197 yards by Jack Clancy. The two teams combined for a total of 1,237 yards of offense, breaking the record of 1,189 set against Northwestern in 2000. With the win, Michigan became bowl eligible for the first time since Rich Rodriguez began his tenure as head coach.

=== At Purdue ===
Michigan at Purdue

Team	1	2	3	4	Total
• Wolverines	14	0	6	7	27
Boilermakers	3	10	3	0	16

- Date: November 13
- Location: Ross–Ade Stadium
  West Lafayette, IN
- Game start: 12:00 pm EST
- Elapsed time: 2:59
- Game attendance: 50,260
- Game weather: 62 °F (17 °C), Overcast/Rain
- Referee: John O'Neill
- TV announcers (BTN): Eric Collins, Chris Martin & Charissa Thompson

After their thriller against Illinois, the Wolverines traveled to rainy West Lafayette, Indiana to face the Purdue Boilermakers. During the previous meeting, Purdue stunned Michigan 38–36 when they rallied from a 14-point deficit during the second half after trailing 24–10 at halftime.

Michigan scored first when Cameron Gordon picked up a Purdue fumble and ran it back 58 yards for a touchdown, their first defensive points of the season. They added to their lead a few minutes later with a 9-yard touchdown pass to Roy Roundtree. Purdue scored their first points late in the first quarter with a 20-yard field goal by Carson Wiggs, and then added more points in the second quarter when Ricardo Allen intercepted a Denard Robinson pass and ran it back 94 yards for a touchdown. They then came within a point of a tie a few minutes later by kicking a 46-yard field goal, but would not come any closer. Early in the third quarter, Michigan's Vincent Smith ran in a 19-yard touchdown, but the extra point failed. Purdue's only score of the second half was a 40-yard field goal that came in the third quarter. Michigan sealed their win late in the fourth quarter with a 3-yard touchdown run by Stephen Hopkins.

The wet conditions wreaked havoc on both teams' offensive production, as each team committed five turnovers, with each team returning one of those turnovers for a touchdown. Robinson set the Michigan season record for total offensive yards during the second quarter at Purdue. Robinson accounted for 244 yards in the contest, bringing his season total to 3,407 yards, and breaking the season mark held by John Navarre (3,240 yards in 2003).

=== Vs. Wisconsin ===
Wisconsin at Michigan

Team	1	2	3	4	Total
• #6 Badgers	7	17	7	17	48
Wolverines	0	0	21	7	28

- Date: November 20
- Location: Michigan Stadium
  Ann Arbor, MI
- Game start: 12:00 pm EST
- Elapsed time: 3:03
- Game attendance: 112,276
- Game weather: 41 °F (5 °C), Sunny, W 7 MPH
- Referee: Dan Capron
- TV announcers (ESPN): Dave Pasch, Bob Griese, Chris Spielman & Jeannine Edwards

For their final home game of the season, Michigan hosted the Wisconsin Badgers. Michigan looked to extend its two-game win streak, but faced a tough challenge, as Wisconsin was ranked 6th in the AP Poll and was fresh off of an 83–20 pounding of Indiana. During the previous meeting between the two schools, Wisconsin won by a score of 45–24, with Scott Tolzien throwing 5 touchdown passes during the game.

Michigan was never in contention during the game, as Michigan's offense was shut out in the first half, while Wisconsin's offense dominated Michigan's defense and jumped out to a 24–0 halftime lead. Wisconsin's only score of the first quarter was a 1-yard touchdown run by Montee Ball. In the second quarter, they added to their lead with a 25-yard field goal by Philip Welch, a 27-yard touchdown run by Montee Ball, and a 61-yard run by James White. Michigan started the second half by finally getting on the board with 2 touchdowns: a 24-yard reception by Darryl Stonum, and then a 4-yard run by Denard Robinson. Wisconsin responded with a 23-yard run by James White. Michigan replied with an 11-yard run by Denard Robinson. The Badgers added to their lead on the opening play of the fourth quarter with a 3-yard run by Montee Ball. Wisconsin then more added points with a 40-yard field goal. Michigan's only score of the quarter was a 28-yard catch by Roy Roundtree. Wisconsin sealed its win with a 4-yard run by Montee Ball.

Denard Robinson broke Beau Morgan's major-college record for yards rushing by quarterbacks and became the first player in NCAA history with 1,500 yards rushing and 1,500 yards passing in one year. Morgan had 1,494 yards rushing for Air Force in 1996. Robinson beat that mark with a 12-yard run in the third quarter against the Badgers. The win was Wisconsin's first at Michigan Stadium since 1994.

=== At Ohio State ===
Michigan at Ohio State
(The Game)

Team	1	2	3	4	Total
Wolverines	0	7	0	0	7
• #8 Buckeyes	0	24	13	0	37

- Date: November 27
- Location: Ohio Stadium
  Columbus, OH
- Game start: 12:00 pm EST
- Elapsed time: 3:10
- Game attendance: 105,491
- Game weather: 35 °F (2 °C), Partly Cloudy, NW 13 MPH
- Referee: Dennis Lipksi
- TV announcers (ABC): Sean McDonough, Matt Millen & Quint Kessenich

To end the regular season, Michigan traveled to Columbus, Ohio to face its archrivals, the Ohio State Buckeyes, with the goal of ending Ohio State's Big Ten title chances. Ohio State won the previous meeting, its sixth straight against Michigan, capitalizing on five Tate Forcier turnovers en route to a 21–10 victory.

Neither team was able to score in the first quarter. Michigan had the best scoring opportunity, as they drove down into the Ohio State red zone before Denard Robinson fumbled the ball during a run. Ohio State opened the scoring early in the second quarter with a 33-yard field goal by Devin Barclay, and then added to their lead with a 7-yard touchdown reception by Dane Sanzenbacher. Michigan got their only points of the game a few minutes later with a 1-yard run by Michael Shaw. Ohio State then proceeded to score 27 unanswered points and put the game out of reach. Immediately following the Michigan touchdown, Jordan Hall returned the kickoff 85 yards for a touchdown. Ohio State then added to their lead with a 33-yard reception by DeVier Posey. The Buckeyes had a chance to extend their lead at the end of the first half, but a Terrelle Pryor pass was intercepted by Jordan Kovacs in the Michigan endzone. In the third quarter, Dan Herron added a 32-yard run, and Barclay added two more field goals from 36 and 23 yards. These were the final points of the game, as neither team was able to score in the final quarter.

It was Michigan's seventh straight loss to Ohio State, its longest losing streak to the Buckeyes in school history. Denard Robinson gained 192 yards of total offense against the Buckeyes, but left the game during the third quarter due to two dislocated fingers on his left hand. At the end of the regular season, Robinson had 1,643 rushing yards, which moved him into fifth place on U-M's all-time season rushing yardage list. He also had 2,316 passing yards for a total of 3,959 yards of offense.

After the 2010 season, an NCAA investigation was launched into rules violations by Ohio State, which included allegations that Buckeyes head coach Jim Tressel knowingly played ineligible players during several 2010 games, including the Michigan game. The NCAA investigation, which resulted in Tressel's resignation, is ongoing and may lead to sanctions; Ohio State preemptively in July 2011 imposed internal sanctions, one of which was vacating all of Ohio State's 2010 victories, including the game over Michigan. For this reason, the Columbus Dispatch reported in May 2011 that Ohio State had delayed the award of its traditional "gold pants" charms for the 2010 victory over Michigan.

=== Vs. Mississippi State ===
Mississippi State vs. Michigan
(Gator Bowl)

Team	1	2	3	4	Total
• #21/22 Bulldogs	10	21	14	7	52
Wolverines	14	0	0	0	14

- Date: January 1, 2011
- Location: EverBank Field
  Jacksonville, FL
- Game start: 1:30 pm EST
- Elapsed time: 3:08
- Game attendance: 77,497
- Game weather: 72 °F (22 °C), Sunny, S 13 MPH
- Referee: Jerry McGinn
- TV announcers (ESPN2): Mike Patrick, Craig James & Todd Harris

In its first bowl appearance since 2007, Michigan traveled to Jacksonville to play the Mississippi State Bulldogs in the Gator Bowl. This game was the first meeting between the two schools, and the first game against a Big Ten opponent for Mississippi State since 1980. Michigan entered the game in search of its 20th total bowl victory, and played an SEC opponent for the 30th time in school history. Two days before the game, Michigan learned that backup QB Tate Forcier was declared academically ineligible and would not participate in the Gator Bowl. In response, Michigan named freshman Devin Gardner the backup QB to Denard Robinson. The team did, however, receive some good news during the week leading up to the game, as WR Martavious Odoms was cleared to play in his first game since October 9 against Michigan State, during which he suffered a broken foot.

The game began as a seesaw affair between the two teams. Michigan struck first with Denard Robinson throwing a 10-yard pass to Roy Roundtree for a touchdown on the game's first drive. Mississippi State responded with a 4-yard touchdown pass from Chris Relf to Arceto Clark and a 42-yard field goal by Derek DePasquale, the field goal being a direct result of a blocked punt by Mississippi State. Michigan responded with a 27-yard touchdown reception by Martavious Odoms. After the first quarter ended, Michigan led 14–10, but would not score any more points during the game. Mississippi State blew the game wide open in the second quarter with twenty-one points. Vick Ballard and Chris Relf both had rushing touchdowns, of two yards and one yard respectively, while Ricco Sanders also had a 15-yard touchdown reception for Mississippi State. By halftime, Mississippi State led 31–14 and showed no signs of slowing down. On the opening drive of the third quarter, Michigan's defense forced its first three and out, but on the subsequent drive, Brendon Gibbons missed a 35-yard field goal. The Bulldogs finished the game with twenty-one second half points. Fourteen of these came in the third quarter on two rushing touchdowns by Ballard of seven yards and one yard, while the final touchdown came via a Relf 31-yard pass to Michael Carr in the fourth quarter.

The game broke several Gator Bowl records, as well as Michigan records. The twenty-four points scored in the first quarter broke the previous Gator Bowl record for most points in the first quarter, which was set in 2005 between West Virginia and Florida State. Denard Robinson finished the season with 4,272 yards of total offense, a Michigan single-season record. The game was also the worst loss in Michigan's history in a bowl game, with the previous record being a 45–17 loss to Tennessee in the 2002 Citrus Bowl.

In the aftermath of the bowl loss to Mississippi State, coach Rich Rodriguez was relieved of his duties.

== Statistics ==
The offense improved upon its 2009 performance to finish first in the Big Ten in total offense and third in scoring. However, Michigan ranked last in the Big Ten and 110th out of 120 Football Bowl Subdivision schools in defense.

Denard Robinson finished first in the conference in rushing and total offense, while finishing fourth and second in the nation in these categories respectively. Jonas Mouton also led the conference in tackles, while teammate Jordan Kovacs finished second. Robinson averaged 130.92 rushing yards per game, while averaging 328.62 yards of total offense. Mouton averaged 9.25 tackles per game, while Kovacs averaged 8.92 tackles. The per game team rankings below include 120 Football Bowl Subdivision teams and 11 Big Ten Conference teams:

Category	National rank	Actual	National leader	Actual	Conference rank	Big Ten Conference leader	Actual
Rushing Offense	13	238.54	Georgia Tech	323.31	3	Illinois	246.08
Passing Offense	36	250.15	Hawaii	394.29	2	Indiana	287.17
Total offense	8	488.69	Oregon	530.69	1	Michigan	488.69
Scoring Offense	25	32.77	Oregon	47.00	3	Wisconsin	31.77
Rushing Defense	95	188.92	Boston College	82.77	10	Ohio State	96.69
Pass Efficiency Defense	103	144.79	TCU	94.92	9	Ohio State	98.60
Total Defense	110	450.77	TCU	228.46	11	Ohio State	262.23
Scoring Defense	108	35.23	TCU	12.00	11	Ohio State	14.31
Net Punting	69	36.07	UCLA	41.27	7	Michigan State	38.12
Punt returns	67	7.43	Utah	17.60	8	Michigan State	13.00
Kickoff returns	68	21.44	UCF	27.78	8	Ohio State	26.38
Turnover Margin	109	-.77	Virginia Tech	1.36	11	Ohio State	1.15
Pass defense	112	261.85	TCU	128.77	11	Ohio State	165.54
Passing Efficiency	23	145.97	Auburn	180.52	5	Wisconsin	168.10
Sacks	98	1.38	Boise St.	3.69	7	Purdue	2.75
Tackles For Loss	77	5.38	Miami (FL)	8.85	6	Purdue	7.58
Sacks Allowed	T-10	.85	Air Force	.38	1	Michigan	.85

The per game rankings below include players who have played in 75% of team's games and are ranked in the top 100 national leaders and top 25 conference leaders:

Category	Player	National rank	Actual	National leader	Actual	Conference rank	Big Ten Conference leader	Actual
Rushing	Denard Robinson	4	130.92	LaMichael James	144.25	1	Robinson (Michigan)	130.92
	Vincent Smith		46.23			18		
	Michael Shaw		33.50			23		
Passing Efficiency (Min. 15 Att./Game)	Denard Robinson	20	149.58	Kellen Moore	164.17	6	Scott Tolzien	165.92
Total offense	Denard Robinson	2	328.62	Bryant Monitz	367.29	1	Robinson (Michigan)	328.62
	Vincent Smith		46.23			24		
Receptions Per Game	Roy Roundtree	T-35	5.54	Ryan Broyles	11.92	4	Demarlo Belcher (Indiana)	6.50
	Junior Hemingway		3.77			15		
	Darryl Stonum		3.20			20		
Receiving Yards Per Game	Roy Roundtree	44	71.92	Justin Blackmon	148.50	3	Jeremy Ebert (Northwestern)	73.31
	Junior Hemingway		3.77			12		
	Darryl Stonum		3.20			18		
Interceptions	James Rogers		.23	Jayron Hosely	.69	T-9	Brett Greenwood (Iowa)	.38
	Cameron Gordon		.23			T-9		
	Jonas Mouton		.17			T-21		
	Jordan Kovacs		.15			T-25		
Punting (Min. 3.6 Punts/Game)				Tyler Campbell	46.37		Aaron Bates (Michigan State)	45.00
Punt returns (Min. 1.2 Ret./Game)				Shaky Smithson	19.07		Keshawn Martin (Michigan State)	14.25
Kickoff returns (Min. 1.2 Ret./Game)	Darryl Stonum	73	23.32	Nick Williams	37.35	9	Derrell Johnson-Koulianos	29.29
	Jeremy Gallon		21.81			12		
Field goals	Seth Broekhuizen		.27	Josh Jasper	2.15	11	Derek Dimke (Illinois)	1.85
Scoring	Denard Robinson	T-92	6.46	LaMichael James	12.00	13	Devin Barclay	9.38
	Seth Broekhuizen		4.64			T-23		
	Michael Shaw		4.50			T-24		
All-Purpose Runners	Denard Robinson	34	130.92	Damaris Johnson	222.15	3	Tandon Doss	175.82
	Darryl Stonum		88.15			14		
	Roy Roundtree		71.92			20		
Sacks	Ryan Van Bergen		.31	Da'Quan Bowers	1.19	T-9	Ryan Kerrigan	1.08
	Greg Banks		.23			T-22		
Tackles	Jonas Mouton	25	9.75	Luke Kuechly	14.08	1	Mouton (Michigan)	9.75
	Jordan Kovacs	T-40	8.92			2		
	Kenny Demens		6.31			T-19		
	Cameron Gordon		5.92			25		
Tackles For Loss	Jonas Mouton		.71	Kerrigan (Purdue)	2.17	T-19	Kerrigan (Purdue)	2.17
	Jordan Kovacs		.65			T-23		
	Ryan Van Bergen		.65			T-23		

== Individual accomplishments ==
Denard Robinson became the first major-college quarterback to throw and rush for 1,500 yards in one season. He also went on to set the Big Ten Conference single-season rushing yards by a quarterback record and was named a Davey O'Brien Award semifinalist. In November, he was also named as one of sixteen Maxwell Award semifinalists. Center David Molk was a finalist for the Rimington Trophy. Michigan had three individual statistical champions for conference game statistics: Denard Robinson averaged 317.5 yards of total offense per game, wide receiver Roy Roundtree averaged 83.9 receiving yards per contest and punter Will Hagerup averaged 46.0 yards per punt. They also had three champions for all games: Robinson 130.9 rushing yards per game and 328.6 average yards of total offense, while Jonas Mouton recorded 9.8 tackles per game. Denard Robinson was also named the Big Ten Offensive Player of the Year. In addition, the following other players were selected to the All-Big Ten Conference team: Denard Robinson (1st team – media, honorable mention – coaches), Molk (1st team – media & coaches), Mike Martin (2nd team – coaches, honorable mention – media) Mouton (2nd team – media), Roundtree (2nd team – media), Stephen Schilling (honorable mention – coaches & media), and Jordan Kovacs (honorable mention – media). Denard Robinson was also named the winner of the Chicago Tribune Silver Football for being the Big Ten's Most Valuable Player.

Denard Robinson was named Big Ten Offensive Player of the Year by the coaches, the Big Ten media and College Football News (CFN)—despite not being named by the coaches to either the first or second All-Big Ten team; however, he was a first team All-conference selection by the media and CFN. He also edged out Terrelle Pryor as the Big Ten Conference Most Valuable Player as voted by the Big Ten coaches, although both had the same number of first place votes. He was a first team All-American selection by the Football Writers Association of America as a running back, a third team selection by the Associated Press as an all-purpose player, and an honorable mention quarterback selection by Sports Illustrated and College Football News. He finished sixth in the Heisman Trophy voting.

Molk was also recognized by Sports Illustrated as an honorable mention All-American. Cam Gordon was selected as a second team Freshman All-American by CFN at safety, and he was joined on the second team by offensive line selection Taylor Lewan. Schilling was selected as a participant to the Senior Bowl, while Mouton was selected to play in the East–West Shrine Game.

== Postseason ==
The postseason quickly became an eventful one for the team. Four days after their game against Mississippi State, Rich Rodriguez was fired along with his entire staff after failing to meet expectations, as well as failing to defeat rivals Ohio State and Michigan State during his three seasons as head coach. Michigan immediately launched a national coaching search, and hired Brady Hoke as its new head coach one week later. Although the entire coaching staff was fired, Hoke elected to retain running backs coach Fred Jackson.

In addition to Rodriguez's firing, Michigan also saw the departure of QB Tate Forcier. Forcier cited the fact that he felt no longer wanted as a reason for his departure from the school.

=== 2011 NFL draft ===
Following their postseason recognition, Jonas Mouton and Stephen Schilling were invited to participate in the NFL Combine, which was held from February 23 – March 1. They were both drafted. Following the 2011 NFL lockout, the following Wolverines signed: tight end Martell Webb with the Philadelphia Eagles, cornerback James Rogers with the Denver Broncos and offensive lineman Perry Dorrestein with the New York Jets. Former Wolverine transfers also signed: linebacker Cobrani Mixon from Kent State University with the Detroit Lions and offensive guard Justin Boren ended up in Baltimore Ravens. The following seniors were initially unsigned: linebacker Obi Ezeh and defensive linemen Greg Banks and Adam Patterson. However, Ezeh signed with the Washington Redskins on July 31. Banks was also a late signee with the Detroit Lions.

Round	Pick #	NFL team	Player	Position
2	61	San Diego Chargers	Jonas Mouton	Linebacker
6	201	San Diego Chargers	Stephen Schilling	Offensive guard

== Roster ==
2010 Michigan Wolverines football roster
Quarterbacks: 5 Tate Forcier -Sophomore; 7 Devin Gardner -Freshman; 16 Denard Robinson -Sophomore; 25 Jack Kennedy - (redshirt) Sophomore; Running backs: 2 Vincent Smith -Sophomore; 14 Teric Jones -Sophomore; 15 Michael Cox - (redshirt) Sophomore; 20 Michael Shaw -Junior; 28 Fitzgerald Toussaint - (redshirt) Freshman; 29 Phil Monolo -Freshman; 32 O'Neil Swanson - (redshirt) Freshman; 33 Stephen Hopkins -Freshman; Fullbacks: 44 Mark Moundros -Senior; 49 John McColgan - (redshirt) Junior; Slot receivers: 8 Terrence Robinson - (redshirt) Sophomore; 9 Martavious Odoms -Junior; 10 Jeremy Gallon - (redshirt) Freshman; 10 Jordan Barpal - (redshirt) Sophomore; 12 Roy Roundtree - (redshirt) Sophomore; 19 Kelvin Grady - (redshirt) Junior; 26 Drew Dileo-Freshman; Wide receivers: 6 Je'Ron Stokes -Sophomore; 17 Jeremy Jackson -Freshman; 21 Junior Hemingway - (redshirt) Junior; 22 Darryl Stonum -Junior; 30 Doug Rogan - (redshirt) Junior; 81 Baquer Sayed -Freshman; 82 Ricardo Miller -Freshman; 83 Jerald Robinson -Freshman; 84 D.J. Williamson-Freshman; 85 Joe Reynolds - (redshirt) Freshman; 89 Patrick Collins - (redshirt) Sophomore; Tight ends: 40 Nate Allspach -Freshman; 41 John Haarer -Freshman; 42 Dylan Esterline -Freshman; 46 Jon Bills - (redshirt) Junior; 80 Martell Webb -Senior; 86 Kevin Koger -Junior; 88 Brandon Moore - (redshirt) Sophomore	Offensive line: 50 David Molk - (redshirt) Junior; 52 Stephen Schilling -Senior (C); 56 Ricky Barnum - (redshirt) Sophomore; 57 Elliot Mealer - (redshirt) Sophomore; 61 Zac Ciullo - (redshirt) Junior; 63 Rocko Khoury - (redshirt) Sophomore; 64 Christian Pace -Freshman; 65 Patrick Omameh - (redshirt) Sophomore; 69 Erik Gunderson - (redshirt) Freshman; 70 Kristian Mateus -Freshman; 72 Mark Huyge - (redshirt) Junior; 74 John Ferrara -Senior; 75 Michael Schofield - (redshirt) Freshman; 76 Quinton Washington - (redshirt) Freshman; 77 Taylor Lewan - (redshirt) Freshman; 79 Perry Dorrestein -Senior; Linebackers: 8 Jonas Mouton -Senior; 25 Kenny Demens - (redshirt) Sophomore; 26 Isaiah Bell - (redshirt) Freshman; 27 Mike Jones -Sophomore; 36 Rasheed Furrha - (redshirt) Junior; 37 Jake Ryan-Freshman; 42 J.B. Fitzgerald -Junior; 44 Mark Moundros -Senior (C); 45 Obi Ezeh -Senior; 52 Kevin Leach- (redshirt) Junior; 58 Brandon Herron - (redshirt) Junior; 59 Paul Gyarmati - (redshirt) Sophomore; 88 Craig Roh -Sophomore; 94 Jordan Paskorz-Freshman	Defensive ends: 41 Kenny Wilkins-Freshman; 53 Ryan Van Bergen - (redshirt) Junior; 55 Jibreel Black -Freshman; 81 Steve Watson - (redshirt) Junior; 93 Chris Eddins -Freshman; 99 Adam Patterson -Senior; Defensive tackles: 39 Will Heininger - (redshirt) Junior; 54 Richard Ash-Freshman; 62 Dominique Ware - (redshirt) Junior; 67 Nathan Brink - (redshirt) Freshman; 68 Mike Martin -Junior; 68 Alex Schwab - (redshirt) Sophomore; 73 William Campbell-Sophomore; 92 Greg Banks -Senior; 95 Renaldo Sagesse -Senior; 96 Terry Talbott-Freshman; Cornerbacks: 5 Courtney Avery-Freshman; 12 J.T. Floyd - (redshirt) Sophomore; 17 Tony Anderson - (redshirt) Junior; 18 James Rogers -Senior; 22 Terrence Talbott-Freshman; 24 Cullen Christian-Freshman; 29 Troy Woolfolk -Senior; 38 Al Backey - (redshirt) Freshman; Safeties: 3 Marvin Robinson-Freshman; 4 Cameron Gordon - (redshirt) Freshman; 6 Josh Furman-Freshman; 7 Brandin Hawthorne -Sophomore; 13 Carvin Johnson-Freshman; 15 Thomas Gordon - (redshirt) Freshman; 20 Ray Vinopal-Freshman; 21 Jordan Reilly - (redshirt) Junior; 23 Floyd Simmons - (redshirt) Sophomore; 28 Matthew Cavanaugh - (redshirt) Sophomore; 31 Jared Van Slyke - (redshirt) Junior; 32 Jordan Kovacs - (redshirt) Sophomore; 35 Karl Tech - (redshirt) Junior; 36 Zac Johnson - (redshirt) Junior; 40 Mike Williams - (redshirt) Junior; Punters: 43 Will Hagerup-Freshman; Place kickers: 34 Brendan Gibbons - (redshirt) Freshman; 93 Kris Pauloski - (redshirt) Freshman; 96 Jeremy Ross-Freshman; 97 Scott Schrimsher - (redshirt) Junior; Kickers: 46 Seth Broekhuizen - (redshirt) Freshman; Long snappers: 54 Jareth Glanda - (redshirt) Freshman; 66 George Morales - (redshirt) Sophomore; 91 Tom Pomarico - (redshirt) Junior; 94 Curt Graman - (redshirt) Freshman	Head coach: Rich Rodriguez; Coordinators/Assistant coaches: Calvin Magee – Associate head coach, offensive coordinator; Greg Robinson – Defensive coordinator, linebackers coach; Adam Braithwaite – Safeties coach; Tony Dews – Wide receivers coach; Greg Fry – Offensive line coach; Tony Gibson – Assistant head coach, defensive backs coach, special teams coach; Fred Jackson – Running backs coach; Rod Smith – Quarterbacks coach; Bruce Tall – Defensive line coach; Legend: (C) Team captain; Redshirt; Source: Last update: 2010-12-14
