= Patrick Omameh =

American football player (born 1989)

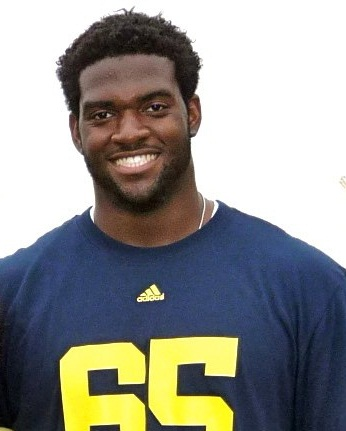
- Omameh with the Michigan Wolverines

No. 66, 65, 77, 70, 60, 78, 63
- Position: Guard

Personal information
- Born: December 29, 1989 (age 36); Columbus, Ohio, U.S.
- Listed height: 6 ft 4 in (1.93 m)
- Listed weight: 305 lb (138 kg)

Career information
- High school: St. Francis DeSales (Columbus)
- College: Michigan
- NFL draft: 2013: undrafted

Career history
- San Francisco 49ers (2013)*; Tampa Bay Buccaneers (2013–2014); Chicago Bears (2015); Jacksonville Jaguars (2016–2017); New York Giants (2018); Jacksonville Jaguars (2018); New Orleans Saints (2019); Las Vegas Raiders (2020); New Orleans Saints (2020); Kansas City Chiefs (2020); Las Vegas Raiders (2021)*; Carolina Panthers (2021)
- * Offseason or practice squad member only

Awards and highlights
- First-team All-Big Ten (2012)

Career NFL statistics
- Games played: 89
- Games started: 58
- Stats at Pro Football Reference

Patrick Chuba Omameh Jr. (born December 29, 1989) is an American former professional football player who was an offensive guard in the National Football League (NFL). The son of Nigerian immigrants to the United States, he played college football for the Michigan Wolverines from 2009 to 2012. He progressed from being the program's lowest-ranked prospect to starting 41 consecutive games for the team.

Omameh went undrafted in 2013, and signed with the San Francisco 49ers of the National Football League (NFL) as a free agent. He subsequently played for the Tampa Bay Buccaneers from 2013 to 2014; his later teams included the Chicago Bears, Jacksonville Jaguars, New York Giants, New Orleans Saints, Las Vegas Raiders, Kansas City Chiefs and Carolina Panthers. Omameh ended his career after being released by the Panthers in 2022, having appeared in 89 regular season NFL games and four playoff games.

== Early life ==
When Omameh was in fourth grade, he did not know what American football was and when he asked his father about it, his father brought out a soccer ball. One of the football coaches persuaded Patrick's parents to let him play, offering to take him to and from practice every day. On the first day of football practice, he wore sandals and a wristwatch. As a senior at St. Francis DeSales High School in Columbus, Ohio, Omameh was selected as a 2007 Division II All-Ohio first team offensive lineman and member of The Columbus Dispatch All-metro team. He was a straight-A student recruited by the likes of Princeton University and Massachusetts Institute of Technology. Omameh matriculated at Michigan as the lowest rated prospect in the 24-man entering class of 2008 according to Rivals.com. He also earned three varsity letters in track & field and one in basketball.

College recruiting
Name	Hometown	School	Height	Weight	40^{‡}	Commit date
Patrick Omameh; OG	Columbus, Ohio	St. Francis de Sales High School (OH)	6 ft 4.5 in (1.94 m)	238 lb (108 kg)	4.85	Feb 5, 2008
Patrick Omameh; OG	Recruit ratings: Scout: Rivals: (69)					
Overall recruit ranking: Scout: 87 (OT) ESPN: 113 (OT)
Note: In many cases, Scout, Rivals, 247Sports, On3, and ESPN may conflict in their listings of height and weight.; In these cases, the average was taken. ESPN grades are on a 100-point scale.; Sources: "Michigan Football Commitments". Rivals.; "2008 Michigan Football Commits". Scout.; "ESPN". ESPN.; "Scout.com Team Recruiting Rankings". Scout.; "2008 Team Ranking". Rivals.com.

== College career ==
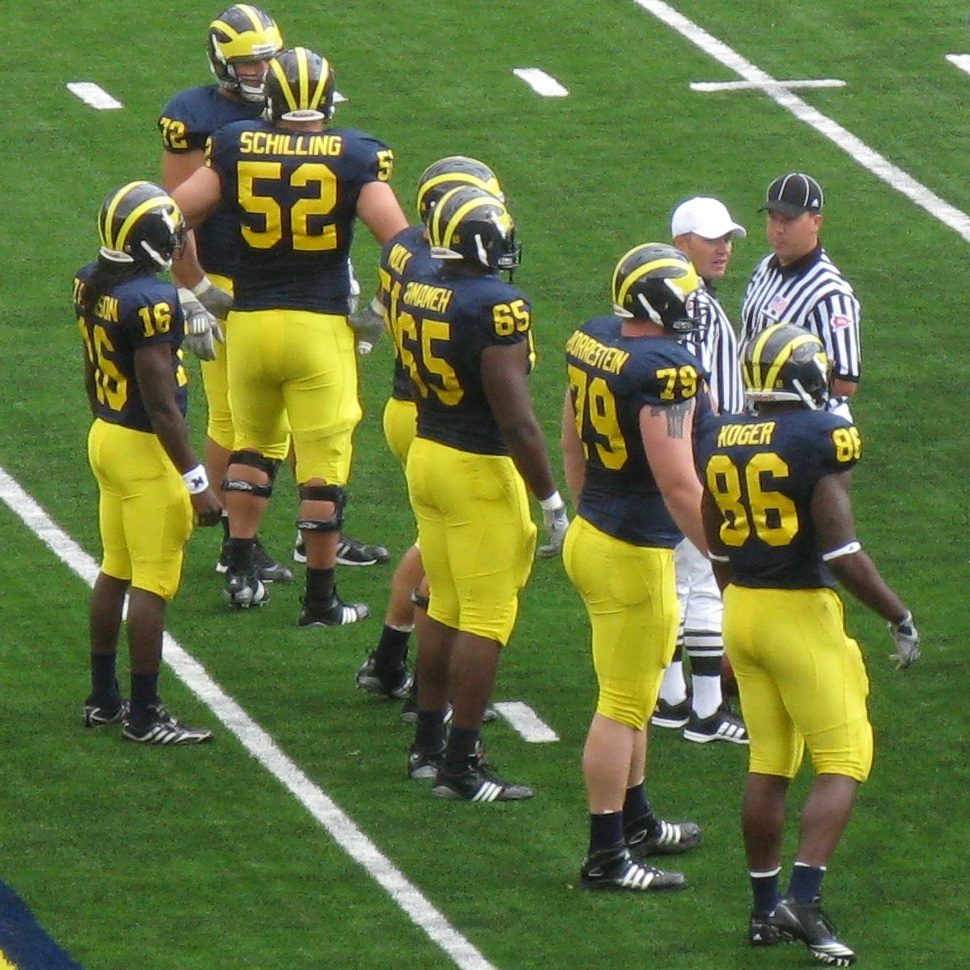
2010 Michigan offense including No. 16 Denard Robinson, No. 86 Kevin Koger, No. 52 Stephen Schilling, and No. 50 David Molk as well as No. 79 Perry Dorrestein, No. 65 Omameh, and No. 72 Mark Huyge

Omameh redshirted as a freshman for the 2008 Michigan Wolverines. He made his first career start on November 7, 2009, when Perry Dorrestein was sidelined with a back injury against Purdue, and Omameh stayed in the starting lineup for the final two games of the season for the 2009 team. Despite being Michigan's lowest rated prospect in the entering class of 2008, he went on to start for the team for three and a half seasons. By the end of the 2012 Michigan–Ohio State game, Omameh had started 41 consecutive games. Omameh played both left and right offensive tackle before starting 41 games at guard.

Omameh has been known for eating prowess since high school, once eating 30 White Castle hamburgers. Even other offensive linemen, such as teammate Taylor Lewan, marveled at his appetite. This helped Omameh bulk up from about 240 pounds (110 kg) as a freshman to over 300 pounds (140 kg) two years later when he became a regular starting offensive lineman.

At Michigan, he had difficulty understanding quarterback Denard Robinson's playcalling in the huddle because of Robinson's rapid speech pattern. In 2010, Omameh was a nominee to be the University of Michigan homecoming king. Omameh was an Academic All-Big Ten in both 2010 and 2011.

On September 18, 2012, Omameh was named to the 11-man Allstate American Football Coaches Association (AFCA) Good Works Team. His Good Works team recognition was for his weekly appearances at the C.S. Mott Children's Hospital. He joins Zoltan Mesko as the only two Michigan players to ever receive the AFCA Good Works Team recognition. On November 13, Omameh was named a finalist for the 2012 Pop Warner National College Football Award. Omameh was a first team All-Big Ten selection by the coaches and an honorable mention selection by the media. He earned his third consecutive Academic All-Big Ten recognition in 2012.

== Professional career ==
Pre-draft measurables
Height	Weight	Arm length	Hand span	Wingspan	40-yard dash	10-yard split	20-yard split	20-yard shuttle	Three-cone drill	Vertical jump	Broad jump	Bench press
6 ft 4 1/8 in (1.93 m)	303 lb (137 kg)	34 5/8 in (0.88 m)	9 1/2 in (0.24 m)	6 ft 11 3/4 in (2.13 m)	5.23 s	1.81 s	3.03 s	4.66 s	7.94 s	27.0 in (0.69 m)	8 ft 11 in (2.72 m)	22 reps
All values from Pro Day

=== Early career as a regular starter ===
Omameh signed an undrafted free agent contract with the San Francisco 49ers following the 2013 NFL draft. Omameh was cut during the final preseason roster moves on August 31, and signed to the practice squad two days later. He spent some time playing tackle. On October 11, the Tampa Bay Buccaneers signed Omameh off of the 49ers' practice squad. They activated him for the final game of the season. During the offseason, he worked with LeCharles Bentley and two dozen other offensive linemen at Bentley's performance facility in Arizona. He started all 16 games for the Buccaneers at the right guard position during the 2014 season. The Buccaneers cut Omameh before the 2015 season on September 5, 2015. On September 6, Omameh was signed the following day to the Chicago Bears after he cleared waivers. After playing 679 snaps for the Bears, he became an unrestricted free agent, but was expected to return to the team.

Omameh signed with the Jacksonville Jaguars on June 2, 2016. Despite not looking that good to coach Doug Marrone in practices, Omameh made the roster over Mackenzy Bernadeau and others. When left guard Luke Joeckel had season-ending surgery in October, Omameh took his place. He was placed on injured reserve on November 21 after sustaining a left foot injury in Week 11 against the Detroit Lions. According to Ryan O'Halloran of The Florida Times-Union, despite his mediocre pass protection performance, in Omameh's six starts (453 snaps) at left guard, he performed superior to the other four people who started in 2016 at that position for the team.

On March 7, 2017, Omameh re-signed with the Jaguars. He started thirteen regular season games and three playoff games at left guard for the Jaguars in 2017. On March 14, 2018, Omameh signed a three-year, $15 million contract with the New York Giants with $5.5 million guaranteed. He entered the season slated as the Giants starting right guard. He started the first six games before missing Week 7 with a knee injury. He was then released by the Giants on November 10, which freed up about $3 million on the salary cap. Prior to his release, Pro Football Focus graded Omameh as the 67th offensive guard. On November 13, Omameh was signed by the Jacksonville Jaguars. Starter Andrew Norwell was placed on injured reserve on November 26, and Omameh was named the starting left guard in Week 13 (December 2) for Chris Reed who had replaced Norwell when he left the game on November 25.

=== Late career ===
Omameh was signed by the New Orleans Saints on July 29, 2019. He appeared in 14 games for them during the 2019 season, starting one. On May 14, 2020, Omameh re-signed with the Saints. He was released on September 5. Omameh was signed to the Las Vegas Raiders practice squad on September 19, and was promoted to the active roster four days later. He was waived on December 14, after having played six games for them as a backup. On December 15, Omameh was claimed off waivers by the New Orleans Saints. He was waived on December 24, having not played in any games for them in his second stint with the team.

On December 26, 2020, Omameh was signed to the Kansas City Chiefs' practice squad. He was elevated to the active roster on January 2, 2021, for the team's Week 17 game against the Los Angeles Chargers, and reverted to the practice squad after the game. The Chiefs lost Super Bowl LV to Tampa Bay. His practice squad contract with the team expired after the season on February 16. On May 24, Omameh signed with the Las Vegas Raiders. He was released on August 31. On November 10, 2021, Omameh was signed to the Carolina Panthers practice squad. He was released on January 4, 2022, having appeared in one game for the team.

Omameh finished his career having appeared in 89 regular season games, 58 of which he started. He also appeared in four playoff games, three as a starter.

== Personal life ==
Omameh's parents, Phyllis and Patrick Sr., moved to Columbus, Ohio from Nigeria in the early 1980s. His father is 5 foot 10 inches (1.78 m) and his mother is 5 foot 6 inches (1.68 m).
