= Cameron Gordon =

Cameron Gordon may refer to:

- Cameron Gordon (mathematician), professor of mathematics at the University of Texas, Austin
- Cam Gordon, Green Party councillor for Minneapolis, Minnesota
- Cameron Gordon (American football) (born 1991), American football linebacker

== See also ==
- Gordon Cameron (disambiguation)
- Cam Gordon (rugby union), Australian rugby union player whose full name is George Campbell Gordon
