= Darryl Stonum =

American football player (born 1990)

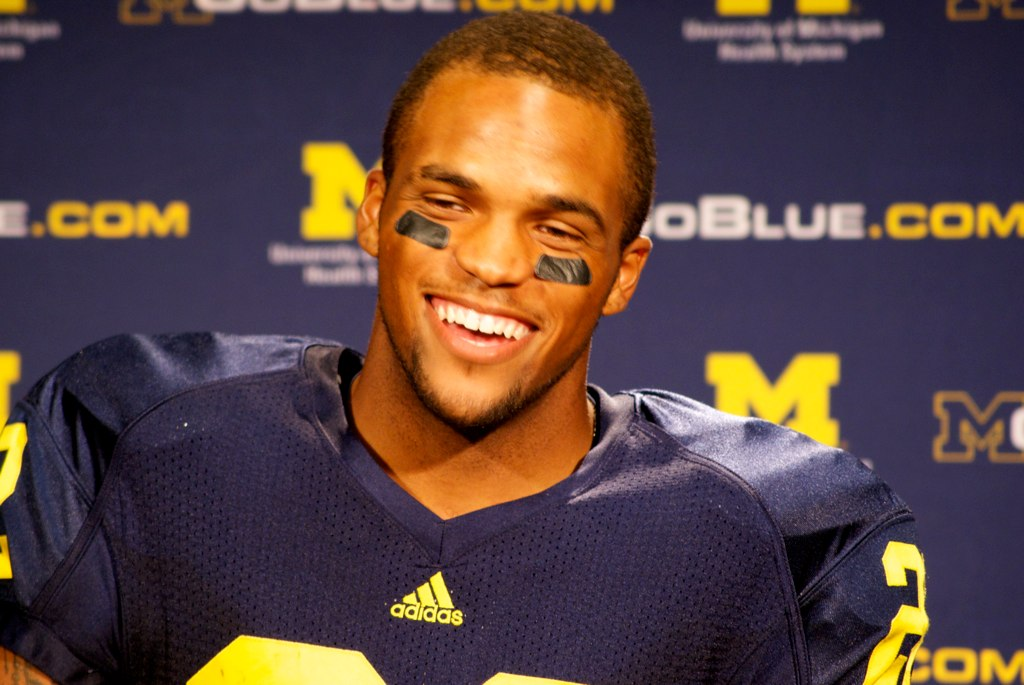

No. 22, 7
- Position: Wide receiver

Personal information
- Born: February 14, 1990 (age 36)
- Listed height: 6 ft 1 in (1.85 m)
- Listed weight: 205 lb (93 kg)

Career information
- High school: Dulles (Sugar Land, Texas)
- Stats at ESPN

Darryl Stonum (born February 14, 1990) is an American former football return specialist and wide receiver. He played at the University of Michigan from 2008 to 2010 and set the Michigan Wolverines football record for most kickoff return yards in a single season with 1,001 yards as a member of the 2009 team. He was the second leading receiver on the 2010 team. He was suspended for the full season from the 2011 team for alcohol-related offenses for which he was placed on probation. Stonum played his final year of collegiate athletic eligibility for the 2012 Baylor Bears football team.

== Early life ==
A native of Stafford, Texas, Stonum attended Dulles High School in Sugar Land, Texas. He was rated as a four-star recruit by rivals.com.

== University of Michigan ==
He enrolled early at the University of Michigan in January 2008. He played as a wide receiver and kick return specialist for the Michigan Wolverines football team from 2008 to 2010. Stonum is 6 feet, 2 inches and weighs 195 pounds. He has been described as having "a prototypical outside receiver's body and uncommon speed for his size."

=== 2008 season ===
As a freshman in 2008, Stonum started 10 games at wide receiver for the Wolverines, catching 14 passes for 176 yards. He caught a 30-yard pass against Notre Dame and had a 51-yard touchdown on a catch-and-run play against Purdue.

=== 2009 season ===
During the 2009 season, he broke Steve Breaston's single-season record with 39 kickoff returns for 1,001 yards. He had a 94-yard kickoff return for a touchdown against Notre Dame—the sixth longest kickoff return in Michigan school history. He also caught 13 passes for 199 yards and one touchdown. Playing against Indiana, Stonum returned seven kicks for 218 yards, the second highest single-game total in school history and three yards short of the school record of 221 yards. He had a career-high 97 receiving yards on five receptions against Michigan State, including a 60-yard touchdown reception.

=== 2010 season ===
2010 Michigan Wolverines football team offense

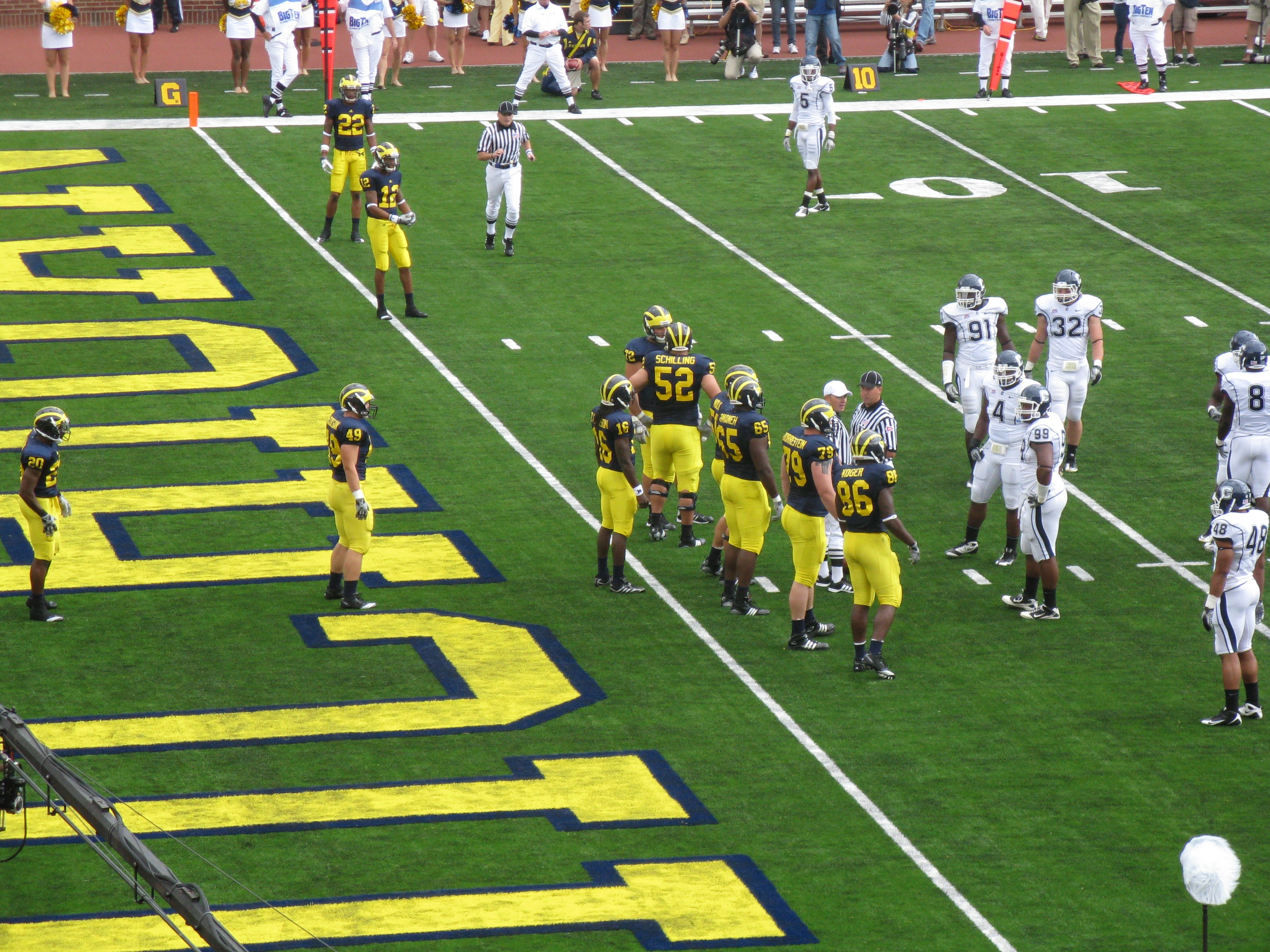
#16 Denard Robinson, #20 Michael Shaw, #22 Stonum, #12 Roy Roundtree, #86 Kevin Koger, #52 Stephen Schilling, and #50 David Molk as well as #79 Perry Dorrestein, #65 Patrick Omameh, and #72 Mark Huyge

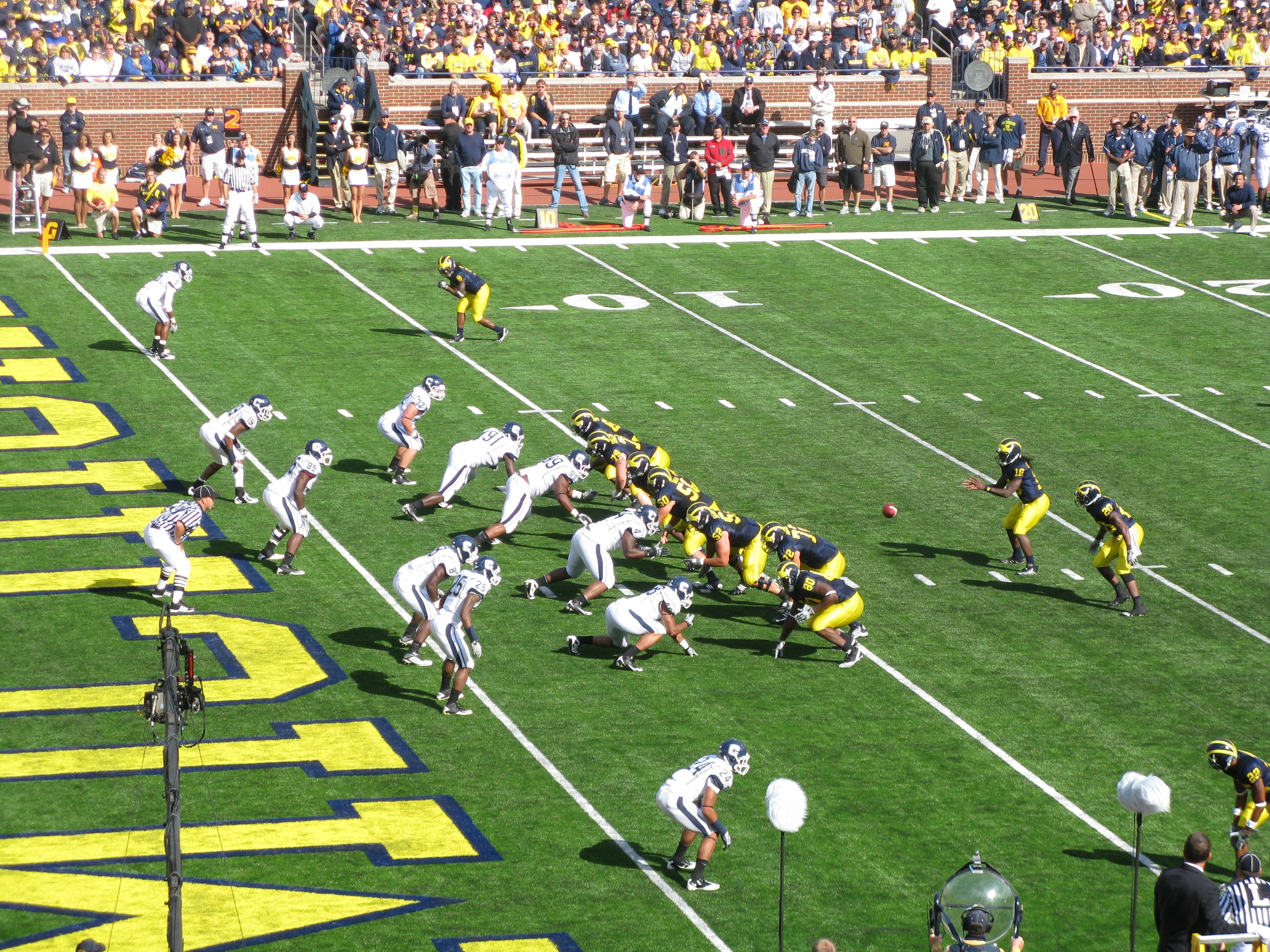
#16 Denard Robinson, #20 Michael Shaw, #22 Stonum, #9 Martavious Odoms, #52 Stephen Schilling, #50 David Molk as well as #79 Perry Dorrestein, #80 Martell Webb, and #72 Mark Huyge

Stonum received press attention when he served three days in Washtenaw County Jail during June 2010 for violating his probation following a September 2008 charge of operating a vehicle while visibly impaired. The probation violation resulted from a failure to submit to the required amount of random alcohol tests and leaving the state without consent. After his release, Stonum told a reporter, "It was a good learning experience. It's something I can look back on and learn from and obviously get better at and make sure that doesn't happen again."

Following an eye exam in the summer of 2010, Stonum learned that he needed contact lenses. Interviewed by The Detroit News in August 2010, Stonum noted, "The first day of camp I had my contacts in, and I could see everything like in HD. ... My deep ball skills got a lot better because I can see the ball from when it's in the air until it gets in my hands." At the end of summer practice, the Detroit Free Press wrote that Stonum had made "significant leaps on and off the field" and credited the contact lenses in part for his "breakthrough."

Stonum appeared in all 13 games for the 2010 team. He was the team's second leading receiver with 49 catches for 633 yards and four touchdowns. Through his first three seasons at Michigan, Stonum had accumulated over 2,500 all-purpose yards, including 1,538 yards on kickoff returns and 1,008 receiving yards.

=== 2011 suspension ===
In May 2011, Stonum was suspended from the football team indefinitely for legal issues. Head coach Brady Hoke stated to the press that before he would let Stonum back on the team, he must "fulfill all his commitments he has to the legal system and our program." Stonum violated probation in a drunken-driving case and was scheduled for a January 6, 2012 probation compliance hearing. At the hearing for driving on a drunken-driving arrest-related revoked driver's license, he was sentenced to 10 days in jail, which he began serving immediately, marking his fourth alcohol-related offense and second prison term for drunken-driving probation violation by age 21. Stonum was determined to have not made any payment toward the $1950 in court fees and to have failed to attend any 12-step meetings in the prior two weeks. He had been on a two-year probation in the courtroom and a full-season suspension from the football team. Following his jail term, he was dismissed from the football team.

== Baylor University ==
On July 22, Texas native Stonum announced that he was a current wide receiver for the Baylor Bears, by thanking his fans and retweeting multiple stories to that effect. He was expected to be granted immediate eligibility under the graduate-school exception if he enrolled in a Baylor graduate program not offered at Michigan.

== Professional career ==
Pre-draft measurables
Height	Weight	Arm length	Hand span	Wingspan	40-yard dash	10-yard split	20-yard split	20-yard shuttle	Three-cone drill	Vertical jump	Broad jump	Bench press
6 ft 1 1/2 in (1.87 m)	205 lb (93 kg)	32 3/8 in (0.82 m)	9 3/8 in (0.24 m)	6 ft 5 3/4 in (1.97 m)	4.57 s	1.59 s	2.63 s	4.64 s	7.26 s	36.5 in (0.93 m)	10 ft 3 in (3.12 m)	16 reps
All values from Pro Day

After going undrafted in the 2013 NFL draft, Stonum attended rookie minicamp on a tryout basis with the Kansas City Chiefs. He later played for the Duke City Gladiators.
