= Jonas Mouton =

American football player (born 1988)

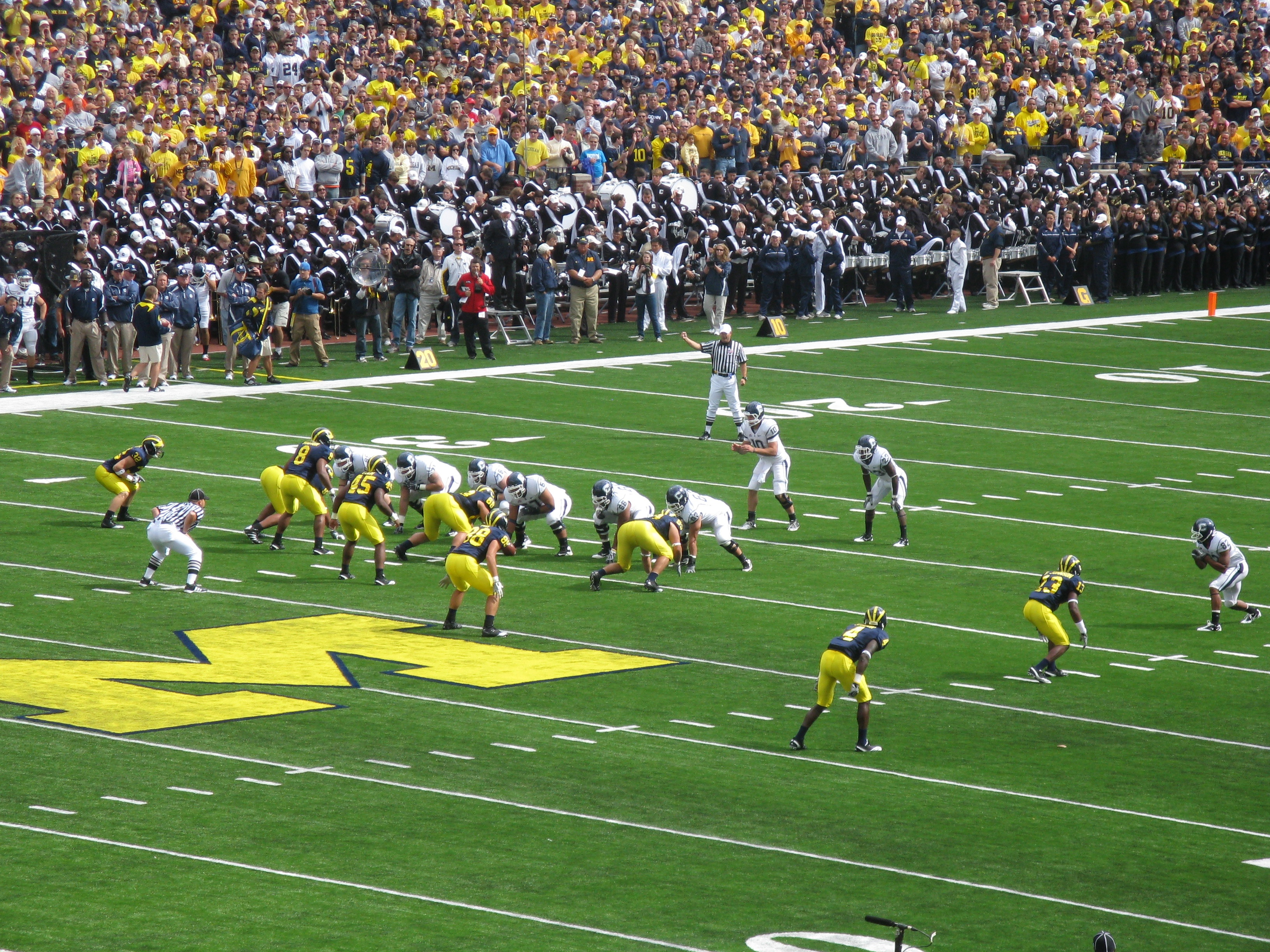
- Mouton as a standup defender toward left side of the defensive line for Michigan vs. 2010 Connecticut Huskies

No. 57
- Position: Linebacker

Personal information
- Born: March 17, 1988 (age 38); Kaplan, Louisiana, U.S.
- Listed height: 6 ft 2 in (1.88 m)
- Listed weight: 240 lb (109 kg)

Career information
- High school: Venice (Los Angeles, California)
- College: Michigan
- NFL draft: 2011: 2nd round, 61st overall pick

Career history
- San Diego Chargers (2011−2013)

Awards and highlights
- Second-team All-Big Ten (2010)

Career NFL statistics
- Total tackles: 1
- Stats at Pro Football Reference

Jonas Mouton (born March 17, 1988) is an American former professional football player who was a linebacker for the San Diego Chargers of the National Football League (NFL). He played his college football for the Michigan Wolverines. He started at weakside linebacker and was previously a highly rated safety for Venice High School.

He led the Big Ten Conference in tackles for the 2010 NCAA Division I FBS football season. He was the starting weakside linebacker for the 2008, 2009 team and 2010 teams. Mouton was named on the preseason watch list for the 2010 Butkus Award for linebackers and was a postseason 2010 All-Big Ten Conference second-team selection by the media. In high school, he played safety in the U.S. Army All-American Bowl.

== Early life ==
Mouton played as a defensive back at Venice High School. In September 2005, the Los Angeles Times ran a feature story about his accomplishments at Venice. The Times story opened as follows:

"The hardest-working player on the Venice High football team is Jonas Mouton, and he has ability to match. A 6-foot-2, 215-pound senior defensive back with linebacker-like hitting skills, a quarterback's awareness of the field and the shifty quickness of a running back, Mouton could rely on natural abilities and coast through high school. But he out-hustled, out-ran and out-lifted just about everyone else during spring practice his sophomore year to earn a spot on varsity. He hasn't slowed since."

The major high school rating reports evaluated him as a safety. Rivals.com listed him as the third best safety in the class of 2006, the seventh best California football player and the 45th best player in the nation. Scout.com ranked him as the sixth best safety. ESPN ranked him as the 14th best safety and 128th best high school football player in the 2006 class. He participated in the January 7, 2006 U.S. Army All-American Bowl.

College recruiting
Name	Hometown	School	Height	Weight	40^{‡}	Commit date
Jonas Mouton; S	Los Angeles, California	Venice (CA)	6 ft 2 in (1.88 m)	210 lb (95 kg)	4.55	Feb 1, 2006
Jonas Mouton; S	Recruit ratings: Scout: Rivals: (81)					
Overall recruit ranking: Scout: 6 (S) Rivals: 45, 3 (S), 7 (CA) ESPN: 128, 14 (S)
Note: In many cases, Scout, Rivals, 247Sports, On3, and ESPN may conflict in their listings of height and weight.; In these cases, the average was taken. ESPN grades are on a 100-point scale.; Sources: "Michigan Football Commitments". Rivals.; "2006 Michigan Football Commits". Scout.; "ESPN". ESPN.; "Scout.com Team Recruiting Rankings". Scout.; "2006 Team Ranking". Rivals.com.

== College career ==
He redshirted in 2006 and made his career debut on September 15, 2007, against Notre Dame. On January 1, 2008, in the Capital One Bowl against Florida he had a 20-yard kickoff return.

On September 6, 2008, he made his first career start against Miami (OH). On September 27, 2008, he had his first quarterback sack in an eight-tackle effort against Wisconsin. Mouton had his first ten-tackle game (eight solo and two assists) on October 18, 2008, against Penn State. On November 15, 2008, against Northwestern he set a new career high with eleven tackles (six solo and five assists). Over the course of the season, he started eleven of the twelve games at weakside linebacker. That season, he finished second on the Wolverines in tackles. However, following the season he was unavailable when 2009 spring practice began due to an injured shoulder.

In the September 12, 2009 Michigan – Notre Dame rivalry game Mouton punched a Notre Dame player and was suspended. Twice in 2009 he had ten tackles (five solo and six assists on September 26, 2009, v. Indiana and two solo and nine assists on November 21, 2009, v. Ohio State). Both games matched his career-high tackles total and against Ohio State, he added an interception. He started at weakside linebacker in all eleven games that he played in.

Mouton was one of fifty-one players named on the preseason watch list for the 2010 Butkus Award for linebackers. On September 11, 2010, Mouton set a career-high with thirteen tackles (6 solo and 7 assists) v. Notre Dame. In that game, he made an interception that led to a one-play thirty-one-yard Michigan touchdown drive. At the midpoint of Michigan's 12-game 2010 regular season schedule, he ranked second in the Big Ten Conference in tackles and tied for sixth in interceptions. He took over the lead in tackles after Michigan's eighth game. Then with a career-high fourteen tackles against Illinois in the ninth game of the season on November 6, he retained his first place rank in the conference and moved up from 32nd to 20th on the national list. Coupled with the 12 tackles on October 30 against Penn State, it was the first time he had back-to-back double digit tackle performances. Mouton was unavailable for the Purdue game on November 13 due to a chest injury. However, the following week against Wisconsin he resumed his streak of double digit tackle performances with thirteen. This moved him up to 17th in the nation in tackles. Mouton ended the 2010 Big Ten Conference football season as the leader in tackles. Following the Big Ten conference regular season he was a second-team All-Conference selection by the media. He was named the 2010 winner of The Roger Zatkoff Award as the team's top linebacker.

== Professional career ==
Pre-draft measurables
Height	Weight	Arm length	Hand span	Wingspan	40-yard dash	10-yard split	20-yard split	20-yard shuttle	Three-cone drill	Vertical jump	Broad jump	Bench press
6 ft 1 in (1.85 m)	239 lb (108 kg)	31 1/2 in (0.80 m)	9 3/4 in (0.25 m)	6 ft 5 1/2 in (1.97 m)	4.89 s	1.64 s	2.79 s	4.34 s	7.08 s	31.5 in (0.80 m)	9 ft 7 in (2.92 m)	17 reps
All values from NFL Combine/Pro Day

Mouton was one of 32 linebackers invited to participate in the February 24 – March 1, 2011 NFL Scouting Combine. He ranked twelfth in the Standing long jump with a distance of 9 feet 7 inches (2.92 m). He ranked eleventh in the 3 cone drill with a time of 7.08. He ranked fourteenth in the 20-yard shuttle with a time of 4.34.

Mouton was selected by the San Diego Chargers with the 61st overall pick in the 2011 NFL draft. The Chargers originally obtained the pick in a trade that sent Antonio Cromartie to the New York Jets. In week 3 of the 2011 NFL season, the Chargers put Mouton on injured reserve for the season. Mouton began the 2012 season inactive. He made his NFL debut on December 2 against the Cincinnati Bengals.

On July 26, 2013, Mouton suffered a torn ACL during training camp. As a result, Mouton was eliminated for the entire 2013 season.

On July 23, 2014, Mouton was waived.
