= Michael Shaw (American football) =

American football player (born 1989)

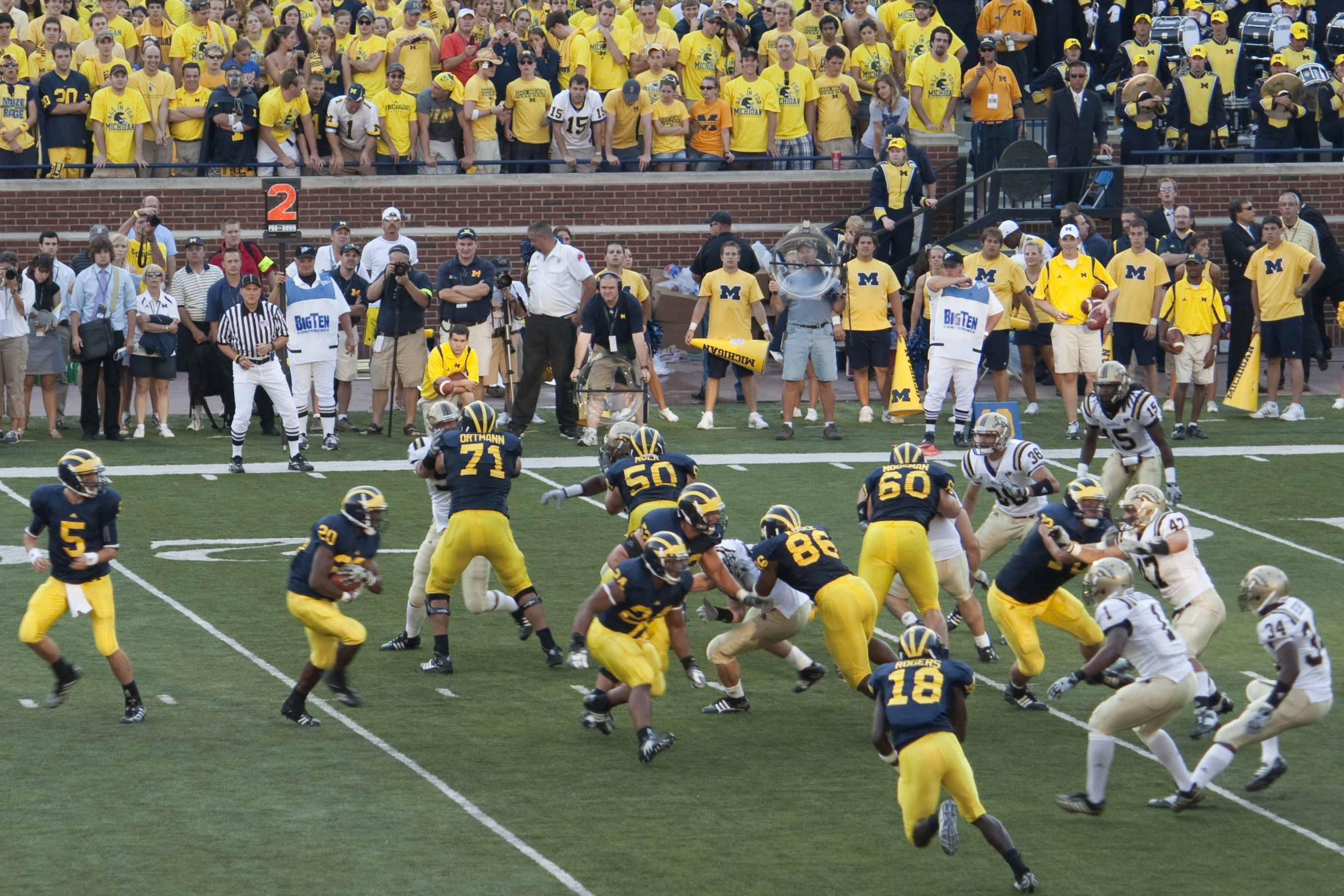
- Shaw (#20) rushes against Western Michigan, 2009

No. 20
- Position: Running back

Personal information
- Born: November 24, 1989 (age 36)
- Listed height: 5 ft 10 in (1.78 m)
- Listed weight: 195 lb (88 kg)

Career information
- High school: Trotwood-Madison (Trotwood, Ohio)
- College: Michigan
- NFL draft: 2012: undrafted

Career history
- Washington Redskins (2012)*
- * Offseason or practice squad member only

Michael Shaw (born November 24, 1989) is an American former football running back. He was signed as an undrafted free agent by Washington Redskins in 2012. He played college football for the Michigan Wolverines football team.

== Early life ==
Shaw was raised and played high school football in Trotwood, Ohio. He played high school football with Roy Roundtree at Trotwood-Madison High School where his coach was longtime National Football League veteran Maurice Douglass. In high school, he was ranked as the nation's seventh-best, 29th-best and 58th-best running back recruit according to Rivals.com, Scout.com and ESPN respectively. He was rated as the sixth-best player in the state of Ohio by Rivals.com.

== College career ==
Shaw was a running back for the Michigan Wolverines football team. As a freshman for the 2008 Michigan Wolverines football team, Shaw started two games and totaled 215 yards on 42 carries. As a sophomore for the 2009 Wolverines, Shaw started four games, and he appeared in nine games for Michigan, rushing for 185 yards on 42 carries for an average of 4.4 yards per carry. That season, he, Roundtree and Trotwood-Madison teammate Brandon Moore were roommates. During the first game of the 2008 Wolverine season, Shaw recorded his first career touchdown against Miami (OH) on September 6, 2008.

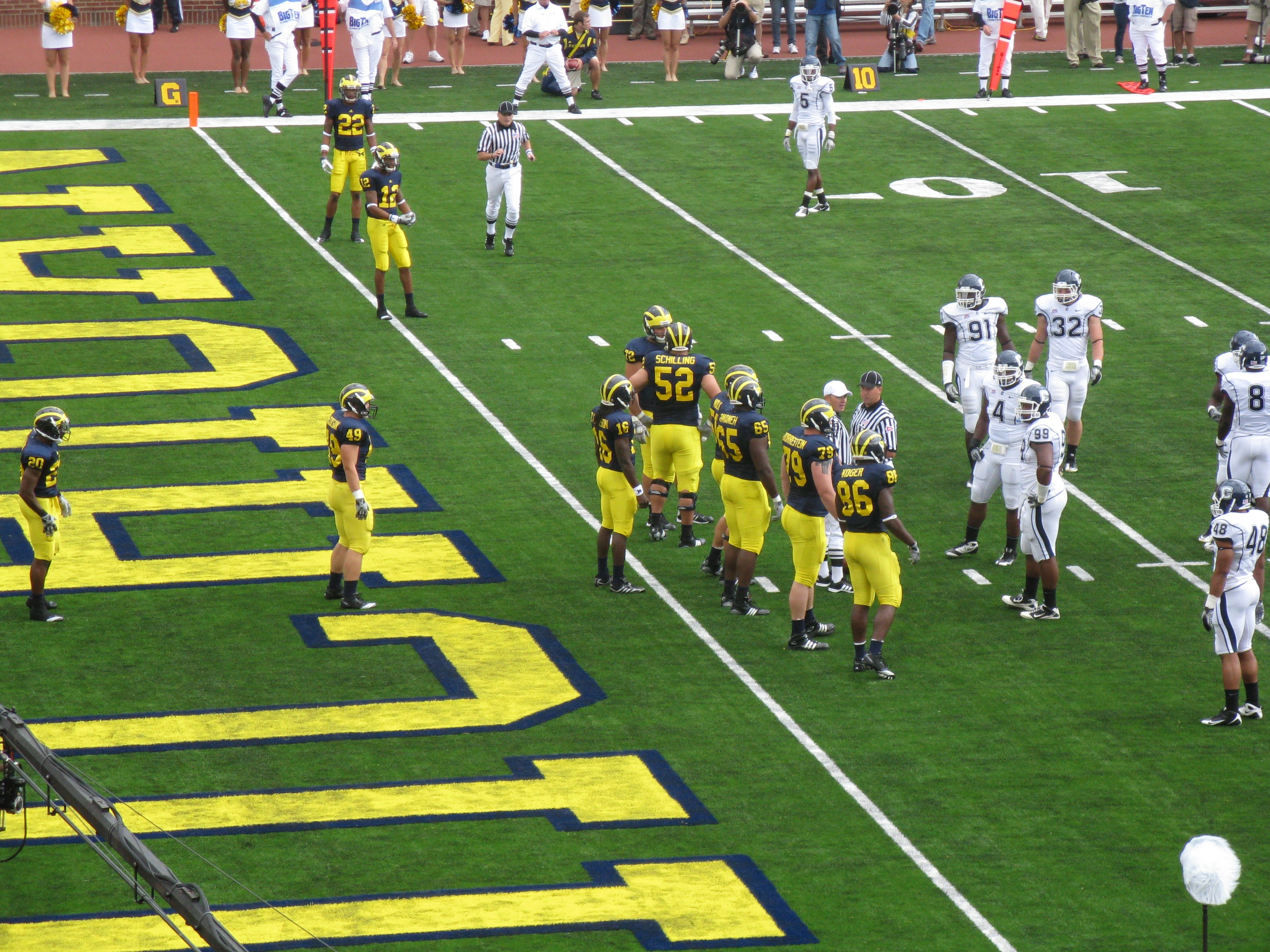
2010 Michigan Wolverines football team offense including #16 Denard Robinson, #20 Shaw, #22 Darryl Stonum, #12 Roy Roundtree, #86 Kevin Koger, #52 Stephen Schilling, and #50 David Molk as well as #79 Perry Dorrestein, #65 Patrick Omamehand, and #72 Mark Huyge

During the regular season in 2010, Shaw ranked second among Michigan's running backs with 383 rushing yards on 71 carries for an average of 5.4 yards per carry. He had nine rushing touchdowns in 2010, including three in a single game against both UMass and Illinois. Against Illinois, he scored two overtime touchdowns including the game-winning touchdown in the third overtime. Against UMass, he recorded a career-high 126 yards rushing and 133 yards from scrimmage.

During the 2011 season, Shaw rushed for 54 yards and a touchdown in Michigan's season opener against Western Michigan. He carried the ball only three times for zero net yards in Michigan's second and third games during the 2011 season. He did not play in Michigan's fourth game against San Diego State. He returned to the lineup against Minnesota, gaining 61 yards and scoring a touchdown on eight carries. For the 2011 regular season, Shaw rushed for 214 yards and three touchdowns.

During his career at Michigan, Shaw carried the ball 90 times, rushing for 1,001 yards and 14 touchdowns.

== Professional career ==
Pre-draft measurables
| Height | Weight | 40-yard dash | 10-yard split | 20-yard split | Vertical jump | Broad jump | Bench press |
|---|---|---|---|---|---|---|---|
| 5 ft 10 1/4 in (1.78 m) | 195 lb (88 kg) | 4.50 s | 1.60 s | 2.58 s | 35.0 in (0.89 m) | 9 ft 7 in (2.92 m) | 16 reps |
All values from Pro Day

Shaw was signed as an undrafted free agent by the Washington Redskins on April 29, 2012. He was released by the Redskins on May 4, 2012, the first day of the team's rookie mini-camp.
