= Gordon Cameron =

Gordon Cameron may refer to:

- Gordon Robertson Cameron (1921–2010), businessman and political figure in the Yukon, Canada
- Gordon Stewart Cameron (1916–1994), Scottish painter
- Gordon Cameron (footballer) (1922–1995), Australian rules footballer
- Gordon Cameron (economist) (1937–1990), British land economist and master of Fitzwilliam College, Cambridge

== See also ==
- William Gordon Cameron (1827–1913), British soldier and colonial administrator
- Cameron Gordon (disambiguation)
