= Kevin Koger =

American football player and coach (born 1989)

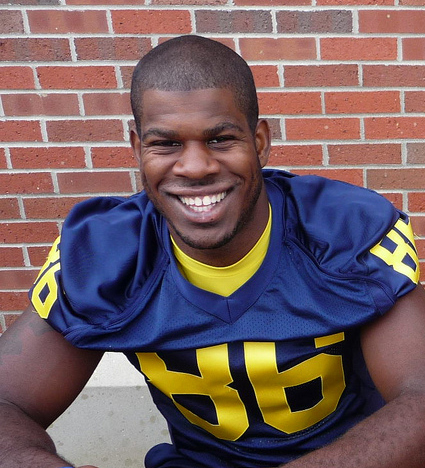
- Koger in 2010

Atlanta Falcons
- Title: Tight ends coach

Personal information
- Born: December 12, 1989 (age 36); Toledo, Ohio, U.S.
- Listed height: 6 ft 4 in (1.93 m)
- Listed weight: 253 lb (115 kg)

Career information
- Position: Tight end
- High school: Whitmer (Toledo, Ohio)
- College: Michigan (2008–2011)
- NFL draft: 2012: undrafted

Career history
- Saline H.S. (2012) Tight ends coach; Michigan (2013–2014) Graduate assistant; Tennessee (2015) Graduate assistant; Eastern Kentucky (2016–2018) Wide receivers coach & special teams coordinator; Green Bay Packers (2019–2020) Offensive quality control coach; Los Angeles Chargers (2021–2023) Tight ends coach; Atlanta Falcons (2024–present) Tight ends coach

Kevin Jamaal Koger (born December 12, 1989) is an American football coach and former college tight end who is currently the tight ends coach for the Atlanta Falcons of the National Football League (NFL). He was a 2011 All-Big Ten honorable mention. In 2012, Koger began working as a coach in Saline, Michigan. Just before signing day in February 2015, Koger joined Butch Jones’s staff at the University of Tennessee as a graduate assistant.

== Early life ==
Koger played high school football at Whitmer High School in Toledo. He holds the school record with 1,190 career receiving yards on 75 receptions. He finished his career with 16 offensive touchdowns. He recorded 151 tackles, 28 tackles for loss, 16 sacks, two forced fumbles, three fumble recoveries, two interceptions, and one interception return for a touchdown during his career. In his senior year, Koger made 31 receptions for 361 yards, scored five touchdowns, and contributed 48 tackles and seven sacks.

=== Honors and rankings ===
- PrepStar Magazine All-American.
- Four-star prospect, the nation's fourth-best tight end and the No. 10 player in the state of Ohio according to Rivals.com.
- Four-star prospect and the sixth-best tight end nationally according to Scout.com.
- Rated No. 5 on the Detroit Free Press Best of the Midwest rankings.
- 107th-best defensive end nationally by ESPN.com.
- Gained All-Ohio first team accolades at defensive end as a senior.
- Earned all-city honors as a tight end and defensive end as a junior.

== College career ==
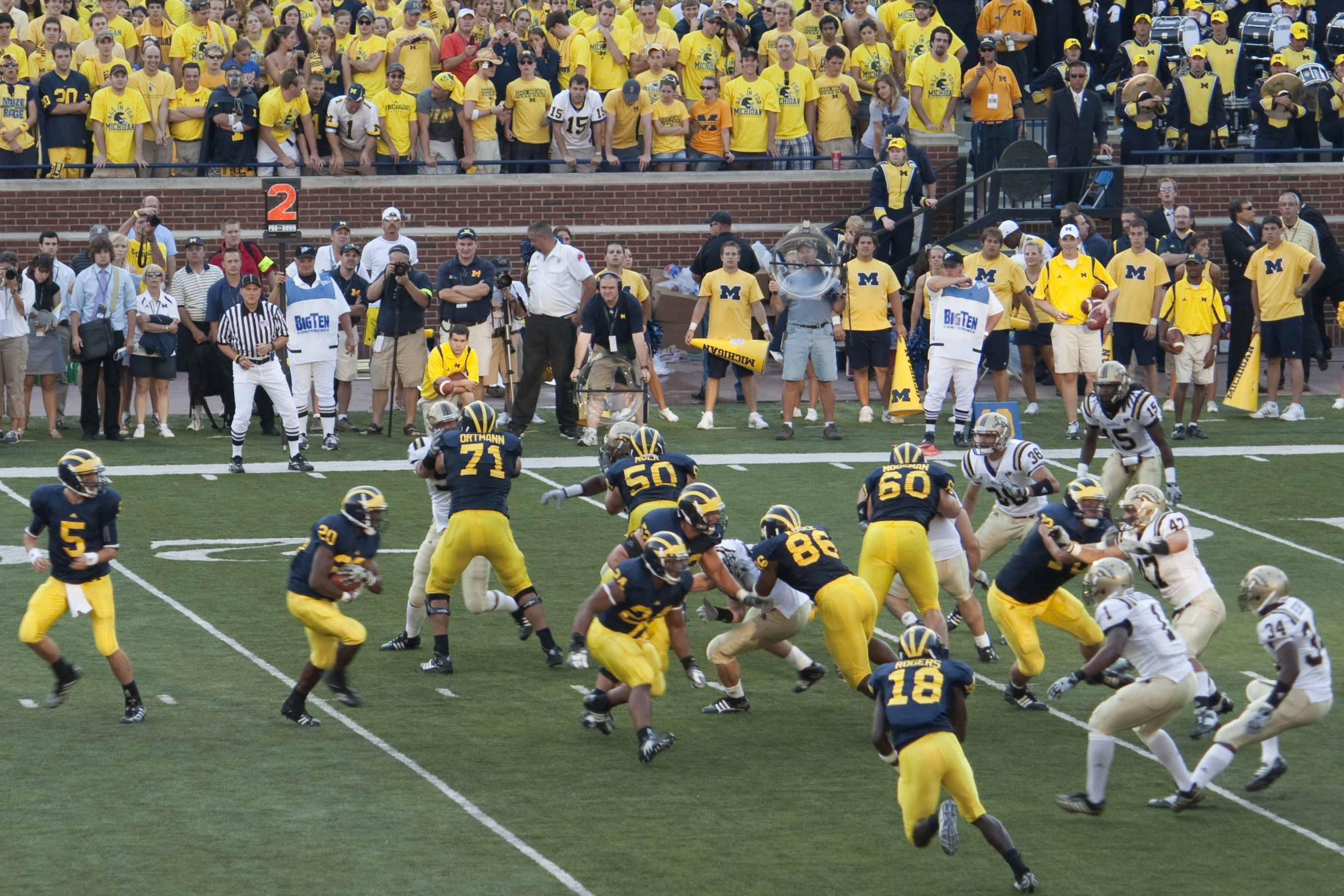
2009 Michigan Wolverines football team offense Koger (86) blocks for Michael Shaw (20) along with Mark Ortmann (71), David Molk (50), Mark Huyge (72), David Moosman (60), Steven Schilling (52), and Kevin Grady.

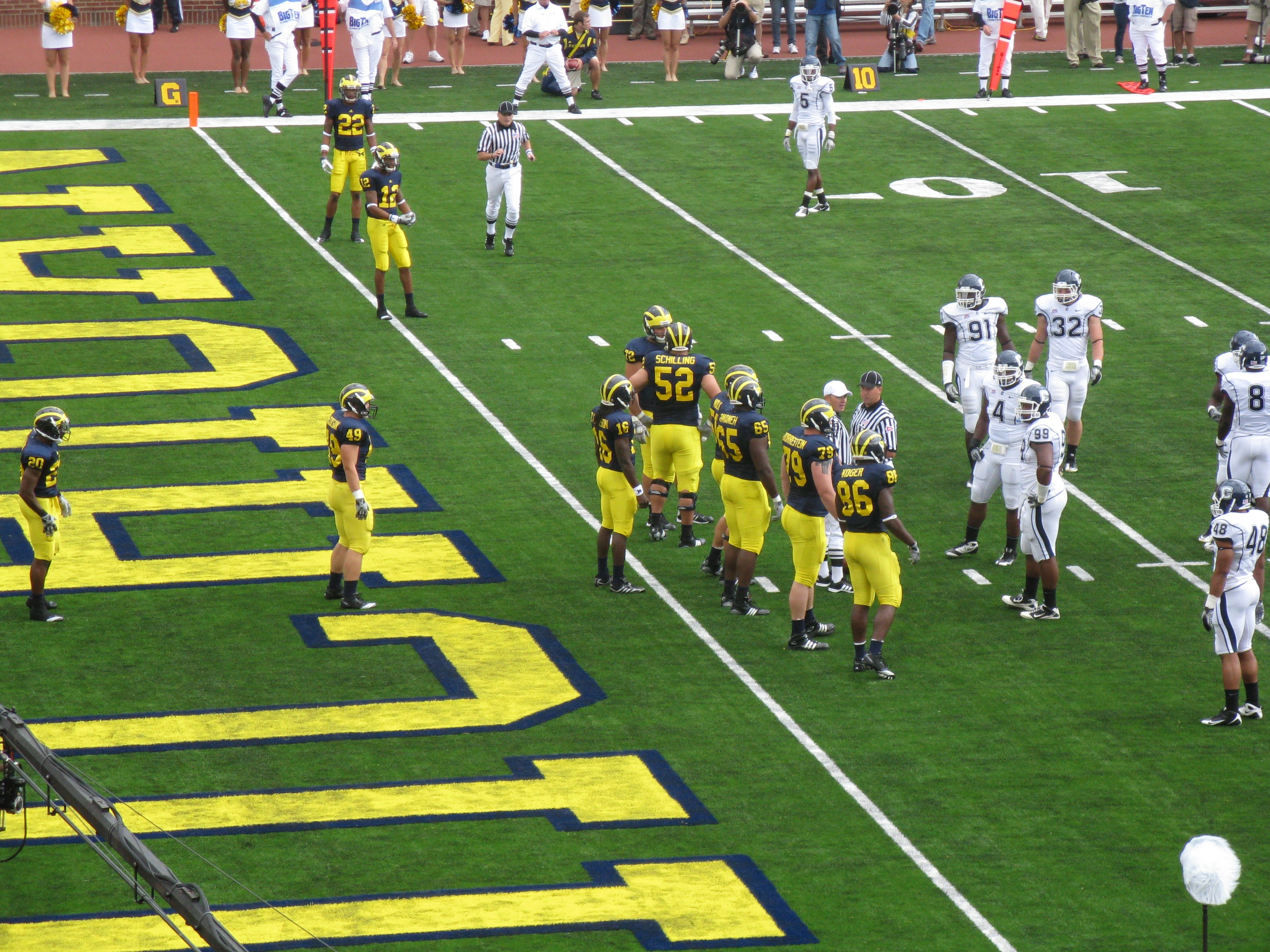
2010 Michigan Wolverines football team offense including #16 Denard Robinson, #20 Michael Shaw, #22 Darryl Stonum, #12 Roy Roundtree, #86 Koger, #52 Stephen Schilling, and #50 David Molk as well as #79 Perry Dorrestein, #65 Patrick Omamehand, and #72 Mark Huyge

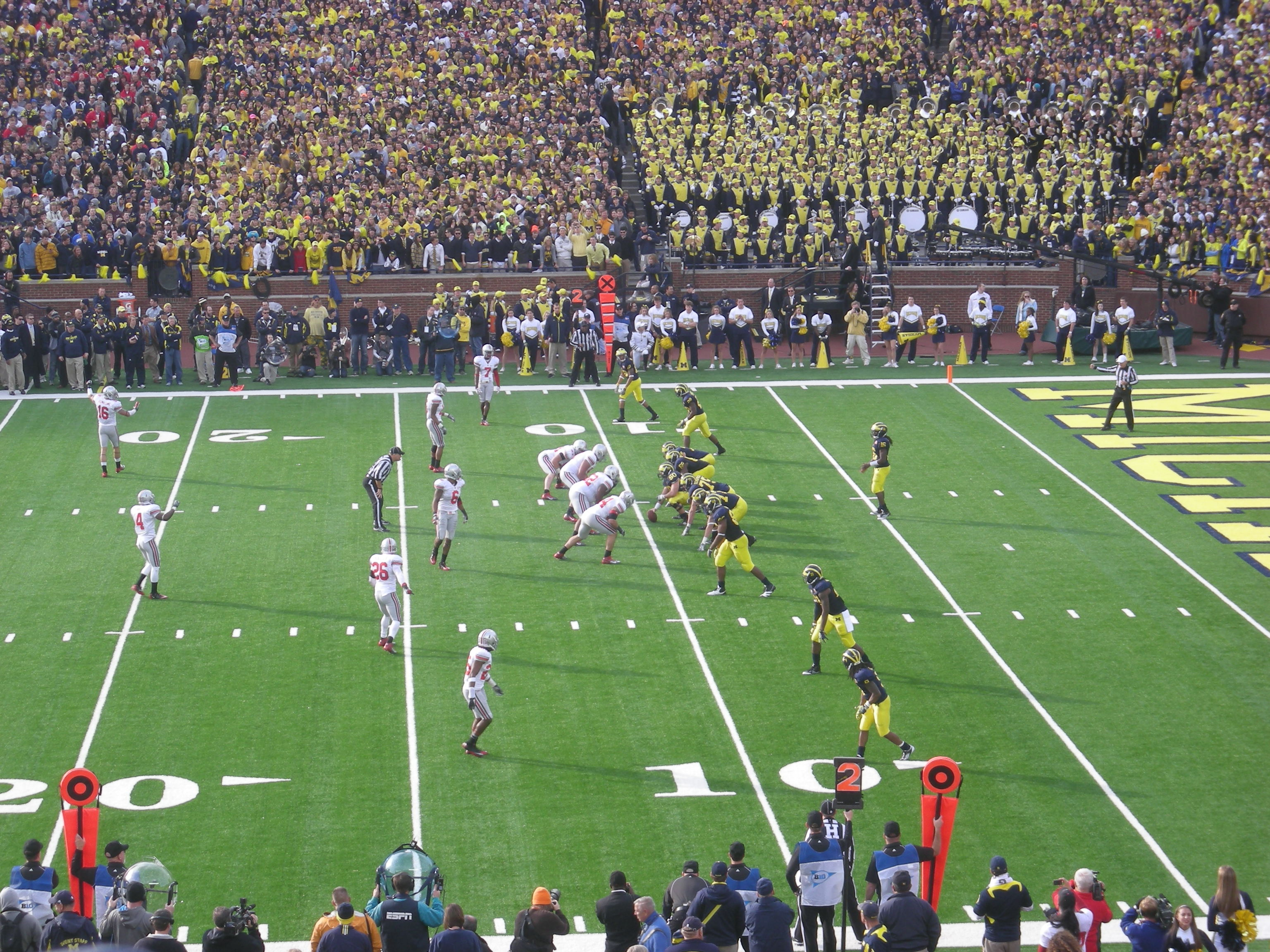
Koger at tight end during the 2011 Michigan-Ohio State rivalry game

Koger accepted a scholarship to play at the University of Michigan, where he enrolled in the division of kinesiology. He caught his first pass on September 27, 2008, against Wisconsin, which went for 26 yards and a touchdown. He took over starting tight end job in fifth week of the season against Illinois.

As a junior in 2010, Koger was watchlisted on the John Mackey Award list for tight ends.

As a senior in 2011, Koger caught 21 passes for 235 yards and four touchdowns. He had his best game of the year against Ohio State, totaling four catches for 40 yards and a touchdown. Following the 2011 Big Ten Conference football season, he earned All-Big Ten Conference honorable mention recognition.

On March 22, Koger endured a torn achilles tendon while doing plyometrics. He had surgery on March 27. The injury requires a five- to eight-month rehabilitation period.

Pre-draft measurables
Height	Weight	20-yard shuttle	Vertical jump	Broad jump	Bench press
6 ft 3 3/4 in (1.92 m)	253 lb (115 kg)	4.53 s	33.5 in (0.85 m)	9 ft 2 in (2.79 m)	21 reps
All values from Pro Day

Koger went undrafted in the April 2012 NFL draft.

== Coaching career ==
Koger coached at Saline High School in Saline, Michigan, before joining the University of Michigan staff as a graduate assistant. In early February 2015, Koger was brought on at the University of Tennessee to serve as a graduate assistant on Butch Jones's staff. On February 15, 2019, Koger was hired as an offensive quality control coach for the Green Bay Packers. On February 11, 2021, Koger was hired as the tight ends coach of the Los Angeles Chargers. On February 1, 2024, he was hired in the same role by the Atlanta Falcons.
