= Josh Furman =

American football player (born 1991)

No. 41
- Position: Safety

Personal information
- Born: November 1, 1991 (age 35); Annapolis, Maryland, U.S.
- Listed height: 6 ft 2 in (1.88 m)
- Listed weight: 210 lb (95 kg)

Career information
- High school: Old Mill (Millersville, Maryland)
- College: Michigan (2010–2013); Oklahoma State (2014)
- NFL draft: 2015: 7th round, 252nd overall pick

Career history
- Denver Broncos (2015)*
- * Offseason or practice squad member only
- Stats at Pro Football Reference

Josh Furman (born November 1, 1991) is an American former professional football safety. He played college football at the University of Michigan and Oklahoma State.

== Early life ==
Furman attended Old Mill High School in Millersville, Maryland, where he was coached by Damian Ferragamo. He played running back and defensive back. As a junior, he had 87 tackles, 25 tackles for loss, eight sacks, six forced fumbles and two blocked punts. As a senior, he played 11 games. He had 60 tackles, nine tackles for loss, three sacks, three forced fumbles, three interceptions and two fumble recoveries. He carried the ball 239 times for 2,285 yards and scored 31 touchdowns. He rushed 42 times for 414 yards and six touchdowns in a 58–55 double-overtime victory against Arundel High School in the playoffs. Furman was four-star recruit and the No. 19 safety prospect nationally by Scout.com, and a three-star prospect and the No. 38 athlete nationally according to Rivals.com. He rated as the 10th-best player in the state of Maryland by Rivals.com and four-star prospect and the seventh-best safety nationally according to Scout.com. During his senior year, he was named Capital-Gazette Communications' Co-Football Player of the Year, The Baltimore Sun Co-Offensive Player of the Year, and Rhodes Trophy winner as the Anne Arundel County Player of the Year.

== College career ==
Furman redshirted his first year with Michigan in 2010.

His freshman year playing in 2011, he was a varsity letterman on Michigan's Sugar Bowl-champion team. He appeared in 12 games – two as a reserve safety and 12 on special teams, blocking a punt.

His sophomore season, he saw action as a reserve safety and on special teams, recording a season-high three tackles against Iowa and had one tackle in five other games.

As a junior, Furman recorded 11 tackles and broke up a pass and a first career start came against Central Michigan, against whom he made a career-high five tackles. He had three tackles against both Nebraska and Ohio State and broke up a pass against the Buckeyes.

For his senior season, Furman transferred from Michigan to Oklahoma State. Furman had 64 tackles, 14 for loss, seven sacks, and one forced fumble his senior season.

== Professional career ==
Furman was selected by the Denver Broncos in the 7th round of the 2015 NFL draft as the 252nd overall pick. He was cut on September 5, 2015.

He participated in The Spring League in 2017.
