= Cameron Gordon (American football) =

American football player and former police trooper (born 1991)

No. 45
- Position: Linebacker

Personal information
- Born: June 5, 1991 (age 35)
- Listed height: 6 ft 3 in (1.91 m)
- Listed weight: 240 lb (109 kg)

Career information
- High school: Inkster (MI)
- College: Michigan
- NFL draft: 2014: undrafted

Career history
- New England Patriots (2014); Kansas City Chiefs (2016)*
- * Offseason or practice squad member only

Awards and highlights
- Super Bowl champion (XLIX)
- Stats at Pro Football Reference

Cameron Gordon (born June 5, 1991) is an American former football linebacker and current FBI Agent. He played college football for Michigan. He signed as an undrafted free agent with the New England Patriots in 2014.

== Professional career ==
=== New England Patriots ===
After going unselected in the 2014 NFL draft, Gordon signed with the New England Patriots on May 12, 2014. On August 26, 2014, he was placed on the team's injured reserve.

Gordon won Super Bowl XLIX with the Patriots after they defeated the defending champion Seattle Seahawks, 28–24.

Gordon was waived by the Patriots on August 27, 2015.

=== Kansas City Chiefs ===
On January 5, 2016, Gordon signed a futures contract with the Kansas City Chiefs.

=== Law Enforcement Career ===
On June 4, 2017, Gordon began recruit training with the Michigan State Police 133rd Trooper Recruit School. Gordon had just been cut by the Kansas City Chiefs and was "team hopping" in the National Football League when he found his second calling. Gordon stated, "I came to the realization that I just wasn't performing the way that I once was, So I said, 'What is another career that will allow me to have an impact, have influence on younger kids and also leave behind a positive legacy?' Instantly, state trooper — law enforcement — jumped into my mind. On November 30, 2017, Gordon completed Trooper Recruit School training and was assigned to the Michigan State Police Metro South Post."
