= 2012 Michigan Wolverines football team =

American college football season

2012 Michigan Wolverines football

Outback Bowl, L 28–33 vs. South Carolina
- Conference: Big Ten Conference
- Legends Division

Ranking
- AP: No. 24
- Record: 8–5 (6–2 Big Ten)
- Head coach: Brady Hoke (2nd season)
- Offensive coordinator: Al Borges (2nd season)
- Offensive scheme: Spread, pro-style
- Defensive coordinator: Greg Mattison (4th season)
- Base defense: 4–3
- MVP: Jordan Kovacs
- Captains: Denard Robinson; Jordan Kovacs; Cameron Gordon; Jake Ryan
- Home stadium: Michigan Stadium

2012 Big Ten Conference football standings
	Conf.			Overall
Team	W		L	W		L
Legends Division
No. 25 Nebraska xy	7	–	1	10	–	4
No. 24 Michigan	6	–	2	8	–	5
No. 17 Northwestern	5	–	3	10	–	3
Michigan State	3	–	5	7	–	6
Iowa	2	–	6	4	–	8
Minnesota	2	–	6	6	–	7
Leaders Division
No. 3 Ohio State* x	8	–	0	12	–	0
Penn State*	6	–	2	8	–	4
Wisconsin y$	4	–	4	8	–	6
Purdue	3	–	5	6	–	7
Indiana	2	–	6	4	–	8
Illinois	0	–	8	2	–	10
Championship: Wisconsin 70, Nebraska 31
$ – BCS representative as conference champion; x – Division champion/co-champions; * Ohio State and Penn State ineligible for conference championship game and post-season bowl games due to NCAA sanctions.; Rankings from AP Poll

The 2012 Michigan Wolverines football team, also known as Team 133 in reference to the 133rd year of the Michigan football program, represented the University of Michigan in the sport of college football during the 2012 NCAA Division I FBS football season.

Under second-year head coach Brady Hoke, Michigan played in the Legends Division of the Big Ten Conference and played its home games at Michigan Stadium in Ann Arbor, Michigan. Highlights of Michigan's season included Michigan becoming the first college football program to win 900 games in NCAA history with its victory over Michigan State and snapping a four-game losing streak to Michigan State as well, as well as a come-from-behind victory against Northwestern.

Taylor Lewan was named Big Ten Offensive Lineman of the Year and All-American, while Will Hagerup was named the Big Ten Punter of the Year. Patrick Omameh also earned first team All-Big Ten recognition. Craig Roh, co-captain Jordan Kovacs and Jake Ryan earned second team recognition. Although they split the quarterbacking duties, both Devin Gardner and co-captain Denard Robinson earned multiple Big Ten Player of the Week awards with Robinson rewriting record books along the way. Following the season, Kovacs was voted team MVP.

== Preseason ==
The 2011 Michigan Wolverines football team compiled an 11–2 record under first-year head coach Brady Hoke and defeated Virginia Tech in the 2012 Sugar Bowl, 23–20 in overtime. In recognition of the team's drastic improvement from the 2010 season, Brady Hoke won Big Ten Coach of the Year awards from both the coaches and media.

Michigan returned 13 out of 22 starters — six on offense and seven on defense. Michigan had also expected to see the return of wide receiver Darryl Stonum, who was redshirted the previous season for disciplinary reason, but Stonum was dismissed from the team on January 17, 2012, for a violation of team rules. He transferred to Baylor. Michigan was forced to replace captains center David Molk, defensive tackle Mike Martin, and tight end Kevin Koger, as well as starters defensive end Ryan Van Bergen, defensive tackle Will Heininger, safety Troy Woolfolk, offensive tackle Mark Huyge, long snapper Tom Pomarico and wide receiver Junior Hemingway, as well as the 2011 team's leading kickoff returner Martavious Odoms.

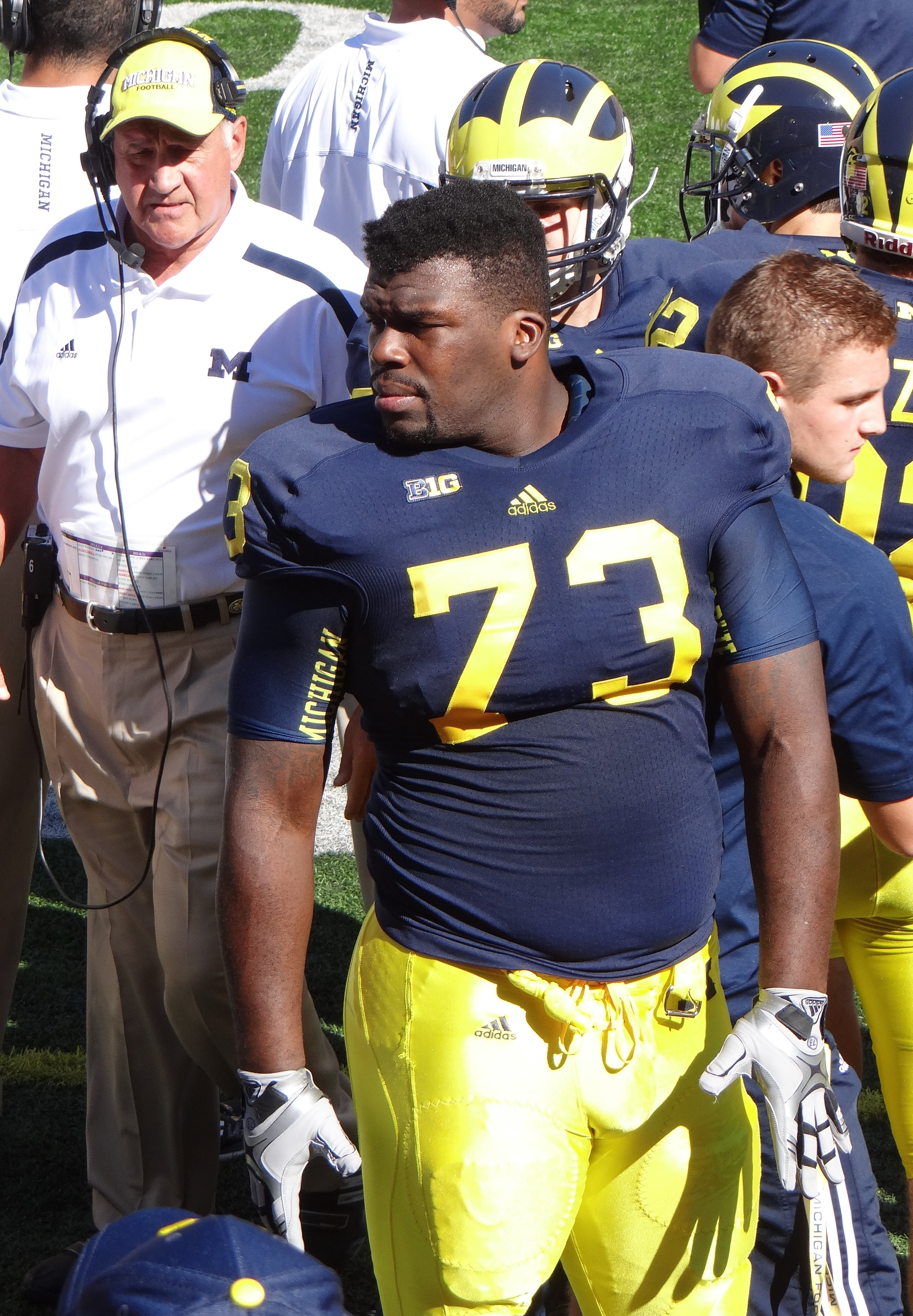
Will Campbell

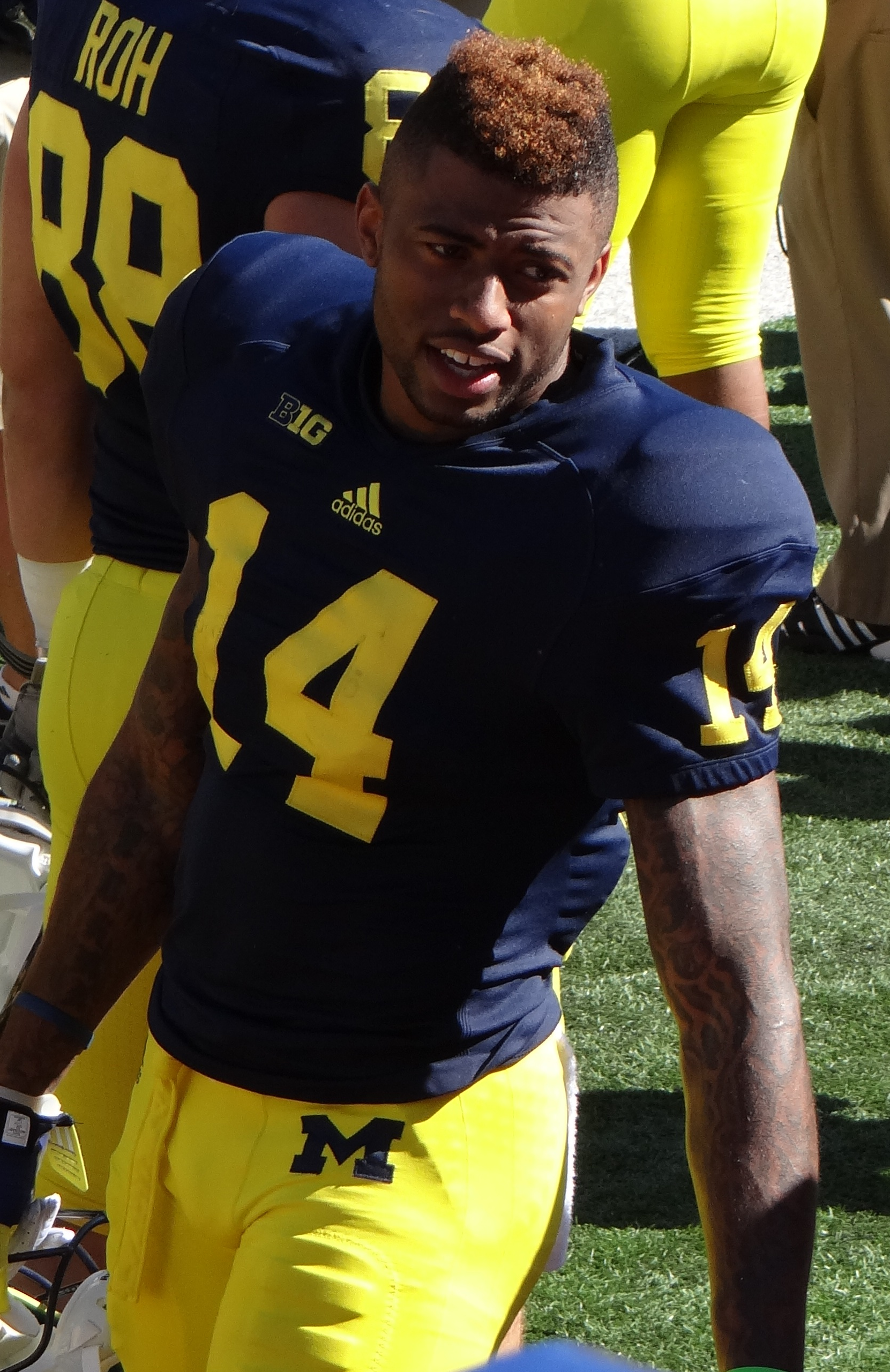
Josh Furman

Safety Josh Furman was arrested February 11, 2012 and faced three misdemeanor charges (illegal entry, assault and battery, and domestic violence) in court. He declined the offer of a plea agreement of domestic violence. He was found not guilty of all three charges on April 26, 2012. On April 30 he was reinstated to the team. In late May 2012, defensive lineman Will Campbell was charged with felony malicious-destruction-of-property arising out of an incident on April 7 in which the six foot, five inch, 322-pound athlete "slid across the hood" of a Lincoln Towncar, causing damage to the hood. On June 14, Campbell reached a plea deal in which the felony charge was waived in exchange for a guilty plea to a misdemeanor charge and an agreement to pay $2,100 in restitution to the vehicle's owner. On July 23, Toussaint was suspended from the team following a July 21 arrest for driving under the influence.

Eight Michigan players were named to pre-season award watch lists: (1) Denard Robinson for the Walter Camp Award (best college), the Maxwell Award (best offensive player), the Davey O'Brien Award (best quarterback), the Manning Award (best quarterback as judged by the Sugar Bowl committee), as well as a Big Ten player to watch, (2) Fitzgerald Toussaint for the Maxwell Award and the Doak Walker Award (best running back), (3) Taylor Lewan for the Outland Trophy (best lineman), the Lombardi Award (best lineman or linebacker), as well as a Big Ten player to watch, (4) Jordan Kovacs for the Bronko Nagurski Trophy (best defensive player), (5) Roy Roundtree for the Biletnikoff Award (best receiver), (6) Brendan Gibbons for the Lou Groza Award (best placekicker), (7) Kenny Demens for the Lombardi Award, and (8) Craig Roh for the Ted Hendricks Award (best defensive end). In addition, Patrick Omameh was nominated for the 2012 Allstate AFCA Good Works Team, which is awarded for community service. On August 26, the team voted Denard Robinson and Jordan Kovacs as its captains for the season.

== Recruiting ==
=== Recruits ===
Michigan's recruiting class was ranked No. 4 by Scout and No. 7 by both Rivals and ESPN. The program received 25 letters of intent on National Signing Day, February 1, 2012.

College recruiting
Name	Hometown	School	Height	Weight	40^{‡}	Commit date
Blake Bars; OL	Nashville, Tennessee	Montgomery Bell Academy	6 ft 5 in (1.96 m)	275 lb (125 kg)	–	Jun 26, 2011
Blake Bars; OL	Recruit ratings: Scout: Rivals: (79)					
Joe Bolden; LB	Cincinnati, Ohio	Colerain H.S.	6 ft 2.5 in (1.89 m)	227.5 lb (103.2 kg)	–	Apr 29, 2011
Joe Bolden; LB	Recruit ratings: Scout: Rivals: (80)					
Ben Braden; OL	Rockford, Michigan	Rockford H.S.	6 ft 6 in (1.98 m)	302 lb (137 kg)	–	Mar 24, 2011
Ben Braden; OL	Recruit ratings: Scout: Rivals: (79)					
Jehu Chesson; WR	St. Louis, Missouri	Ladue Horton Watkins H.S.	6 ft 3 in (1.91 m)	178.5 lb (81.0 kg)	4.5	Dec 21, 2011
Jehu Chesson; WR	Recruit ratings: Scout: Rivals: (79)					
Jeremy Clark; DB	Madisonville, Kentucky	Madisonville North Hopkins H.S.	6 ft 4 in (1.93 m)	205 lb (93 kg)	4.485	Jun 24, 2011
Jeremy Clark; DB	Recruit ratings: Scout: Rivals: (76)					
Amara Darboh; WR	West Des Moines, Iowa	Dowling Catholic H.S.	6 ft 2 in (1.88 m)	195 lb (88 kg)	4.42	Dec 4, 2011
Amara Darboh; WR	Recruit ratings: Scout: Rivals: (78)					
Devin Funchess; TE	Farmington Hills, Michigan	Harrison H.S.	6 ft 4.5 in (1.94 m)	205 lb (93 kg)	–	Apr 22, 2011
Devin Funchess; TE	Recruit ratings: Scout: Rivals: (80)					
Allen Gant; DB	Sylvania, Ohio	Sylvania Southview H.S.	6 ft 2 in (1.88 m)	207.5 lb (94.1 kg)	4.6	May 31, 2011
Allen Gant; DB	Recruit ratings: Scout: Rivals: (75)					
Matt Godin; DT	Novi, Michigan	Detroit Catholic Central H.S.	6 ft 6 in (1.98 m)	267.5 lb (121.3 kg)	5.0	May 12, 2011
Matt Godin; DT	Recruit ratings: Scout: Rivals: (79)					
Willie Henry; DT	Cleveland, Ohio	Glenville H.S.	6 ft 2.5 in (1.89 m)	271.5 lb (123.2 kg)	–	Jan 31, 2012
Willie Henry; DT	Recruit ratings: Scout: Rivals: (75)					
Sione Houma; RB/FB	Salt Lake City, Utah	Highland H.S.	6 ft 0.5 in (1.84 m)	172.5 lb (78.2 kg)	4.515	Jul 25, 2011
Sione Houma; RB/FB	Recruit ratings: Scout: Rivals: (74)					
Royce Jenkins-Stone; LB	Detroit, Michigan	Cass Tech H.S.	6 ft 2 in (1.88 m)	215 lb (98 kg)	–	Apr 16, 2011
Royce Jenkins-Stone; LB	Recruit ratings: Scout: Rivals: (80)					
Drake Johnson; RB	Ann Arbor, Michigan	Pioneer H.S.	6 ft 1 in (1.85 m)	202.5 lb (91.9 kg)	–	Nov 8, 2011
Drake Johnson; RB	Recruit ratings: Scout: Rivals: (72)					
Kyle Kalis; OL	Lakewood, Ohio	St. Edward H.S.	6 ft 5 in (1.96 m)	303.5 lb (137.7 kg)	–	Jul 10, 2011
Kyle Kalis; OL	Recruit ratings: Scout: Rivals: (80)					
Erik Magnuson; OL	Carlsbad, California	La Costa Canyon H.S.	6 ft 6 in (1.98 m)	275 lb (125 kg)	–	Jun 10, 2011
Erik Magnuson; OL	Recruit ratings: Scout: Rivals: (79)					
Dennis Norfleet; RB	Detroit, Michigan	Martin Luther King H.S.	5 ft 7 in (1.70 m)	167.5 lb (76.0 kg)	–	Feb 1, 2012
Dennis Norfleet; RB	Recruit ratings: Scout: Rivals: (75)					
Mario Ojemudia; DE	Farmington Hills, Michigan	Farmington Hills Harrison H.S.	6 ft 2.5 in (1.89 m)	217.5 lb (98.7 kg)	4.675	May 7, 2011
Mario Ojemudia; DE	Recruit ratings: Scout: Rivals: (80)					
Ondre Pipkins; DT	Kansas City, Missouri	Park Hill H.S.	6 ft 3 in (1.91 m)	322.5 lb (146.3 kg)	5.05	Aug 8, 2011
Ondre Pipkins; DT	Recruit ratings: Scout: Rivals: (80)					
Terry Richardson; DB	Detroit, Michigan	Cass Tech H.S.	5 ft 9.25 in (1.76 m)	162.5 lb (73.7 kg)	4.5	May 19, 2011
Terry Richardson; DB	Recruit ratings: Scout: Rivals: (81)					
Kaleb Ringer; LB	Clayton, Ohio	Northmont H.S.	6 ft 0.5 in (1.84 m)	222 lb (101 kg)	–	Apr 12, 2011
Kaleb Ringer; LB	Recruit ratings: Scout: Rivals: (78)					
James Ross; LB	Orchard Lake, Michigan	St. Mary's Preparatory	6 ft 0.5 in (1.84 m)	212 lb (96 kg)	4.5	Feb 1, 2011
James Ross; LB	Recruit ratings: Scout: Rivals: (80)					
Tom Strobel; DE	Mentor, Ohio	Mentor H.S.	6 ft 6 in (1.98 m)	255 lb (116 kg)	4.8	Jun 10, 2011
Tom Strobel; DE	Recruit ratings: Scout: Rivals: (78)					
A.J. Williams; TE/OT	Cincinnati, Ohio	Sycamore H.S.	6 ft 6 in (1.98 m)	267.5 lb (121.3 kg)	4.9	Apr 22, 2011
A.J. Williams; TE/OT	Recruit ratings: Scout: Rivals: (77)					
Jarrod Wilson; DB	Akron, Ohio	Buchtel H.S.	6 ft 2 in (1.88 m)	190 lb (86 kg)	–	Jul 8, 2011
Jarrod Wilson; DB	Recruit ratings: Scout: Rivals: (80)					
Chris Wormley; DE	Toledo, Ohio	Whitmer H.S.	6 ft 4.5 in (1.94 m)	252.5 lb (114.5 kg)	4.8	Jun 10, 2011
Chris Wormley; DE	Recruit ratings: Scout: Rivals: (80)					
Overall recruit ranking: Scout: 4 Rivals: 7 ESPN: 7
‡ Refers to 40-yard dash; Note: In many cases, Scout, Rivals, 247Sports, On3, and ESPN may conflict in their listings of height, weight and 40 time.; In these cases, the average was taken. ESPN grades are on a 100-point scale.; Sources: "Michigan Football Commitments". Rivals.; "2012 Michigan Football Commits". Scout.; "ESPN". ESPN.; "Scout.com Team Recruiting Rankings". Scout.; "2012 Team Ranking". Rivals.com.

== Rankings ==
Entering the season, Michigan was ranked No. 8 in both the AP Poll and the Coaches' Poll. Following its opening week loss to Alabama, Michigan dropped to No. 19 in both polls, but rose to No. 18 in the Coaches' Poll and No. 17 in the AP Poll following its victory against Air Force. After its victory against Massachusetts, Michigan rose to No. 17 in the Coaches' Poll, but fell to No. 18 in the AP Poll. Michigan dropped out of the rankings following its loss to Notre Dame, and then stayed unranked following the bye week. Michigan re-entered the AP Poll at No. 25 following its win against Purdue, but remained unranked in the Coaches' Poll. Following its victory over Illinois, Michigan rose to No. 23 in the AP Poll and re-entered the Coaches' Poll at No. 25. Michigan rose to No. 20 in both polls following its victory over Michigan State and entered the BCS rankings at No. 22. Michigan fell out of the rankings after its loss to Nebraska, and remained unranked following its victory over Minnesota. Michigan re-entered the rankings after its overtime win against Northwestern at No. 23 in both the AP Poll and the Coaches' Poll and No. 21 in the BCS poll. After its victory over Iowa, Michigan moved up to No. 20 in both the AP and Coaches' Polls and No. 19 in the BCS Poll. Michigan fell to No. 21 in the AP Poll and No. 24 in the Coaches' Poll, but remained at No. 19 in the BCS Poll after its loss to Ohio State. Michigan rose to No. 19 in the AP Poll and No. 22 in the Coaches' Poll after a bye week. After its loss to South Carolina in the Outback Bowl, Michigan finished the season ranked No. 24 in the AP Poll and unranked in the Coaches' Poll.

Ranking movements Legend: ██ Increase in ranking ██ Decrease in ranking — = Not ranked RV = Received votes т = Tied with team above or below ( ) = First-place votes
	Week															
Poll	Pre	1	2	3	4	5	6	7	8	9	10	11	12	13	14	Final
AP	8 (1)	19	17	18	RV	RV	25	23	20	RV	RV	23T	20	21	19	24
Coaches	8	19	18	17	RV	RV	RV	25	20	RV	RV	23	20	24	22	—
Harris	Not released						RV	RV	20	RV	RV	24	20	23	22	Not released
BCS	Not released							—	22	—	—	21	19	19	18	Not released

*Source: ESPN.com: 2012 NCAA Football Rankings

== Schedule ==
Date	Time	Opponent	Rank	Site	TV	Result	Attendance	Source
September 1	8:00 p.m.	vs. No. 2 Alabama*	No. 8	Cowboys Stadium; Arlington, TX (Cowboys Classic, College GameDay)	ABC	L 14–41	90,413	
September 8	3:30 p.m.	Air Force*	No. 19	Michigan Stadium; Ann Arbor, MI	ABC, ESPN2	W 31–25	112,522	
September 15	3:30 p.m.	UMass*	No. 17	Michigan Stadium; Ann Arbor, MI	BTN	W 63–13	110,708	
September 22	7:30 p.m.	at No. 11 Notre Dame*	No. 18	Notre Dame Stadium; Notre Dame, IN (rivalry)	NBC	L 6–13	80,795	
October 6	4:00 p.m.	at Purdue		Ross–Ade Stadium; West Lafayette, IN	BTN	W 44–13	50,105	
October 13	3:30 p.m.	Illinois^{†}	No. 25	Michigan Stadium; Ann Arbor, MI (rivalry)	ABC, ESPN	W 45–0	110,922	
October 20	3:30 p.m.	Michigan State	No. 23	Michigan Stadium; Ann Arbor, MI (rivalry)	BTN	W 12–10	113,833	
October 27	8:00 p.m.	at Nebraska	No. 20	Memorial Stadium; Lincoln, NE	ESPN2	L 9–23	86,160	
November 3	12:00 p.m.	at Minnesota		TCF Bank Stadium; Minneapolis, MN (Little Brown Jug)	BTN	W 35–13	48,801	
November 10	12:00 p.m.	No. 24 Northwestern		Michigan Stadium; Ann Arbor, MI (rivalry)	ESPN	W 38–31 ^{OT}	112,510	
November 17	12:00 p.m.	Iowa	No. 23	Michigan Stadium; Ann Arbor, MI	ESPN	W 42–17	113,016	
November 24	12:00 p.m.	at No. 4 Ohio State	No. 20	Ohio Stadium; Columbus, OH (The Game)	ABC	L 21–26	105,899	
January 1, 2013	1:00 p.m.	vs. No. 11 South Carolina*	No. 19	Raymond James Stadium; Tampa, FL (Outback Bowl)	ESPN	L 28–33	54,527	
*Non-conference game; ^{†}Homecoming; Rankings from AP Poll released prior to the game; All times are in Eastern time

== Radio ==
Radio coverage for all games will be broadcast statewide on The Michigan Wolverines Football Network and on Sirius XM Satellite Radio. The radio announcers are Frank Beckmann with play-by-play, Jim Brandstatter with color commentary, and Doug Karsch with sideline reports.

== Game summaries ==
=== Vs. Alabama ===
Michigan vs. Alabama
(Cowboys Classic)

Team	1	2	3	4	Total
#8 Wolverines	0	7	7	0	14
• #2 Crimson Tide	21	10	3	7	41

- Date: September 1
- Location: Cowboys Stadium
  Arlington, Texas
- Game start: 8:12 p.m. EDT
- Elapsed time: 3:14
- Game attendance: 90,413
- Game weather: Indoors
- Referee: Reggie Smith
- TV announcers (ABC): Brent Musburger, Kirk Herbstreit & Heather Cox

Scoring summary
1	6:56	ALA	Michael Williams 2-yard pass from A. J. McCarron (Jeremy Shelley kick)	ALA 7–0
1	4:59	ALA	DeAndrew White 51-yard pass From A. J. McCarron (Jeremy Shelley kick)	ALA 14–0
1	1:24	ALA	Eddie Lacy 9-yard Run (Jeremy Shelley kick)	ALA 21–0
2	9:53	ALA	Jeremy Shelley 22-yard field goal	ALA 24–0
2	4:31	ALA	C. J. Mosley 16-yard Interception Return (Jeremy Shelley kick)	ALA 31–0
2	2:20	MICH	Denard Robinson 6-yard run (Brendan Gibbons kick)	ALA 31–7
3	2:34	ALA	Cade Foster 51-yard field goal	ALA 34–7
3	0:14	MICH	Devin Gardner 44-yard pass from Denard Robinson (Brendan Gibbons kick)	ALA 34–14
4	5:32	ALA	T. J. Yeldon 1-yard run (Jeremy Shelley kick)	ALA 41–14

To open the season, Michigan traveled to Arlington, Texas to face the defending BCS Champion, the Alabama Crimson Tide, in the Cowboys Classic. This game was the first between the two teams since the 2000 Orange Bowl, which saw Michigan beat Alabama in overtime 35–34 after Alabama missed the tying extra point.

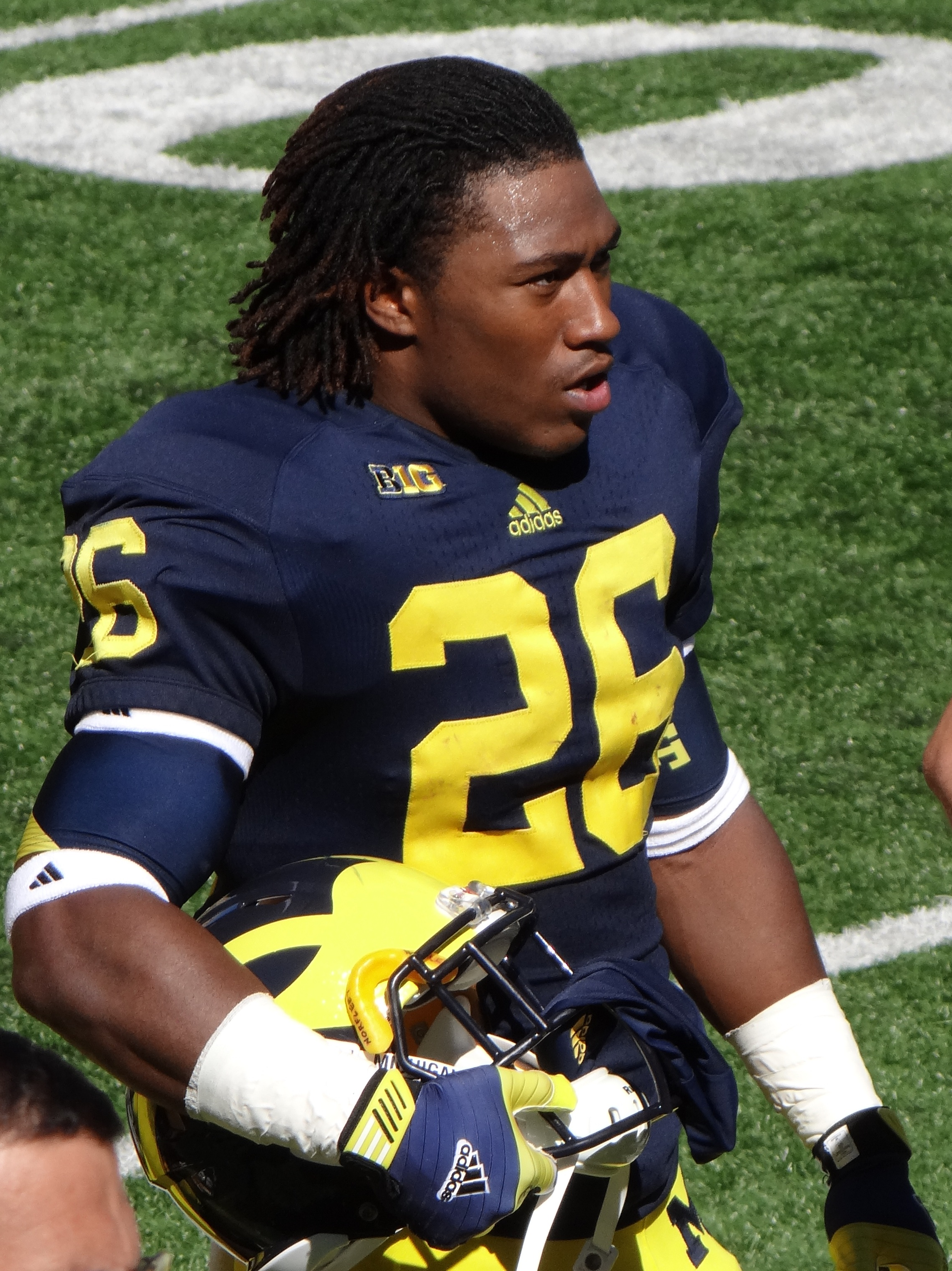
Freshman Dennis Norfleet led Michigan with 177 all-purpose yards against Alabama.

Alabama dominated the Wolverines in the first game of the season, winning 41–14. Alabama opened the scoring and scored 21 points in the first quarter, with Michael Williams catching a two-yard touchdown pass from A. J. McCarron, DeAndrew White catching a 51-yard touchdown pass from McCarron, and Eddie Lacy rushing nine yards for a score. Alabama added ten points in the second quarter as a result of a Jeremy Shelley 22-yard field goal and a C. J. Mosley 16-yard interception return for a touchdown. Michigan scored its first points at the end of the first half on a Denard Robinson six-yard touchdown run, making the halftime score 31–7. In the third quarter, Cade Foster kicked a 51-yard field goal for Alabama, while Michigan responded via a 44-yard touchdown pass from Robinson to Devin Gardner. Those were Michigan's final points of the game. Alabama scored its final points of the game in the fourth quarter as a result of a T. J. Yeldon one-yard run.

The game was Michigan's first season opener at a neutral venue. The loss was Michigan's first in September since September 13, 2008, against Notre Dame. Michigan's record against Alabama fell to 2–2. Jeremy Gallon's 71-yard reception in the second quarter set a record for the longest play in Cowboys Classic history, while Will Hagerup's 61-yard punt also set the record for longest punt in Cowboys Classic history. Thomas Gordon led Michigan's defense with nine tackles and forced one fumble.

=== Vs. Air Force ===
Air Force at Michigan

Team	1	2	3	4	Total
Falcons	3	7	7	8	25
• #19 Wolverines	7	7	14	3	31

- Date: September 8
- Location: Michigan Stadium
  Ann Arbor, Michigan
- Game start: 3:30 p.m. EDT
- Elapsed time: 3:14
- Game attendance: 112,522
- Game weather: 67 °F (19 °C), Partly cloudy, NW 15 mph (24 km/h)
- Referee: Greg Burks
- TV announcers (ABC/ESPN2): Bob Wischusen, Danny Kanell & Maria Taylor

Scoring summary
1	8:39	MICH	Denard Robinson 79-yard run (Brendan Gibbons kick)	MICH 7–0
1	3:44	AFA	Parker Harrington 22-yard field goal	MICH 7–3
1	7:34	MICH	Devin Funchess 30-yard pass from Denard Robinson (Brendan Gibbons kick)	MICH 14–3
2	1:20	AFA	Cody Getz 5-yard run (Parker Harrington kick)	MICH 14–10
3	14:36	MICH	Denard Robinson 58-yard run (Brendan Gibbons kick)	MICH 21–10
3	9:50	AFA	Cody Getz 1-yard run (Parker Harrington kick)	MICH 21–17
3	6:18	MICH	Devin Gardner 7-yard pass from Denard Robinson (Brendan Gibbons kick)	MICH 28–17
4	12:01	AFA	Cody Getz 8-yard run (Cody Getz to Marcus Hendricks pass)	MICH 28–25
4	7:58	MICH	Brendan Gibbons 31-yard field goal	MICH 31–25

Following its trip to Arlington, Michigan hosted the Air Force Falcons in its home opener. This was the first meeting between the teams since Michigan's season opener in 1964, which the Wolverines won 24–7. Pre-game festivities featured a trio of flyovers: a flight by three University of Michigan Survival Flight helicopters, a flight by the bald eagle Challenger, and a B-2 stealth bomber. Prior to the game, Michigan reactivated Bennie Oosterbaan's number (#47) and honored him as a Michigan Football Legend. Linebacker Jake Ryan was given Oosterbaan's number following the conclusion of the ceremony.

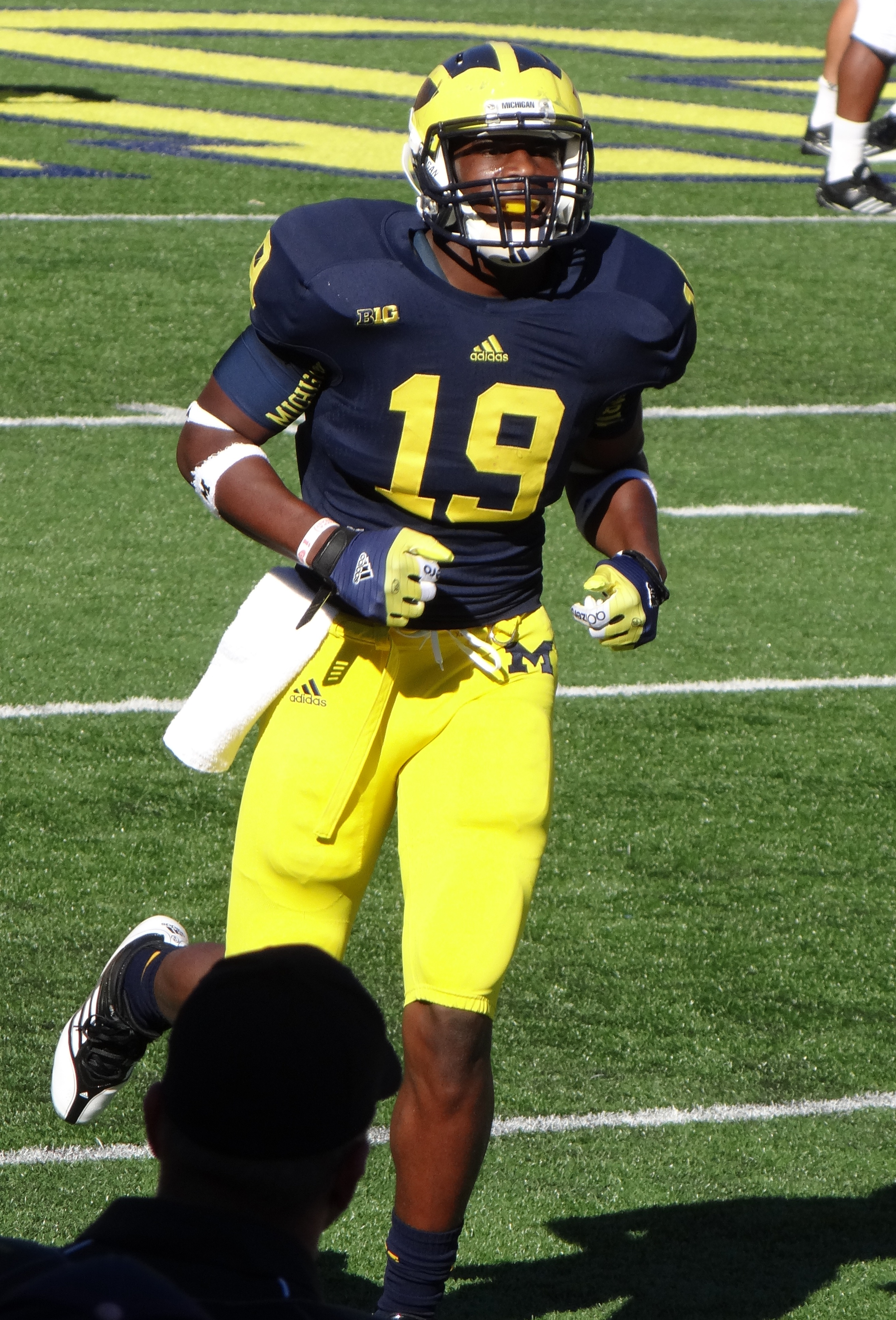
Freshman tight end Devin Funchess scored his first Michigan touchdown against Air Force.

The Wolverines won the game, 31–25. Following a missed field goal on Air Force's opening drive, Denard Robinson ran 79 yards for a touchdown. Air Force responded with a 22-yard field goal from Parker Herrington. In the second quarter, Michigan expanded its lead via a 30-yard Robinson to Devin Funchess touchdown pass. Air Force responded with a five-yard touchdown run from Cody Getz, ending the half trailing 14–10. In the third quarter, Robinson expand Michigan's lead to 11 with a 58-yard touchdown run. Air Force responded with a Getz one-yard run, but Michigan once again increased its lead to 11 points with a Robinson to Devin Gardner seven-yard touchdown pass. In the fourth quarter, Air Force responded with a Getz eight-yard run and converted the two-point conversion attempt on a Getz to Marcus Hendricks pass. Michigan ended the scoring with a Brendan Gibbons 31-yard field goal. Air Force had the ball late in the fourth quarter when linebacker Jake Ryan batted down a pass on fourth down with 1:28 left in the game to secure the victory for Michigan.

Denard Robinson became the first Division-I FBS player to have three career games with at least 200 yards passing and 200 yards rushing. Robinson ran for 218 yards and two touchdowns, and passed for 208 yards and two touchdowns, his eight career game with at least four touchdowns. He was also the first Michigan player to have two touchdown runs of 50 or more yards since Tyrone Wheatley in the 1993 Rose Bowl against Washington. Freshman tight end Devin Funchess became the first Michigan tight end to have at least 100 receiving yards since 1997, when Jerame Tuman had 126 receiving yards against Colorado. Jake Ryan led the Wolverines' defense with 11 tackles, while Joe Boldon posted a career best 10 tackles. The effort moved Robinson into eighth place on the NCAA all-time career quarterback rushing yards list and seventh on the Michigan all-time rushing list. Denard Robinson's September 8, performance earned him his eighth Big Ten Offensive Player of the week recognition as well as College Football Performance Award National Player of the Week and National Quarterback of the Week honors. The same week Devin Funchess earned Freshman of the week honors. By earning his eighth Big Ten Offensive Player of the week recognition, he tied Drew Brees for second on the all-time career list.

=== Vs. Massachusetts ===
Massachusetts at Michigan

Team	1	2	3	4	Total
Minutemen	0	13	0	0	13
• #17 Wolverines	14	28	14	7	63

- Date: September 15
- Location: Michigan Stadium
  Ann Arbor, Michigan
- Game start: 3:40 p.m. EDT
- Elapsed time: 3:20
- Game attendance: 110,708
- Game weather: 71 °F (22 °C), Mostly clear, NW 7 mph (11 km/h)
- Referee: Alex Kemp
- TV announcers (BTN): Eric Collins, Derek Rackley & Lisa Byington

Scoring summary
1	10:39	MICH	Devin Funchess 26-yard pass from Denard Robinson (Brendan Gibbons kick)	MICH 7–0
1	3:10	MICH	Fitzgerald Toussaint 11-yard run (Brendan Gibbons kick)	MICH 14–0
2	13:44	UMASS	Brendon Levengood 25-yard field goal	MICH 14–3
2	13:05	MICH	Vincent Smith 5-yard run (Brendan Gibbons kick)	MICH 21–3
2	9:49	UMASS	Christian Birt 32-yard interception return (Brendon Levengood kick)	MICH 21–10
2	6:47	MICH	Devin Gardner 42-yard pass from Denard Robinson (Brendan Gibbons kick)	MICH 28–10
2	4:00	MICH	Denard Robinson 36-yard run (Brendan Gibbons kick)	MICH 35–10
2	2:07	UMASS	Brendon Levengood 32-yard field goal	MICH 35–13
2	0:19	MICH	Taylor Lewan recovered fumble In end zone (Brendan Gibbons kick)	MICH 42–13
3	10:25	MICH	Roy Roundtree 18-yard pass from Denard Robinson (Brendan Gibbons kick)	MICH 49–13
3	2:58	MICH	Vincent Smith 9-yard run (Brendan Gibbons kick)	MICH 56–13
4	8:24	MICH	Justice Hayes 1-yard run (Brendan Gibbons kick)	MICH 63–13

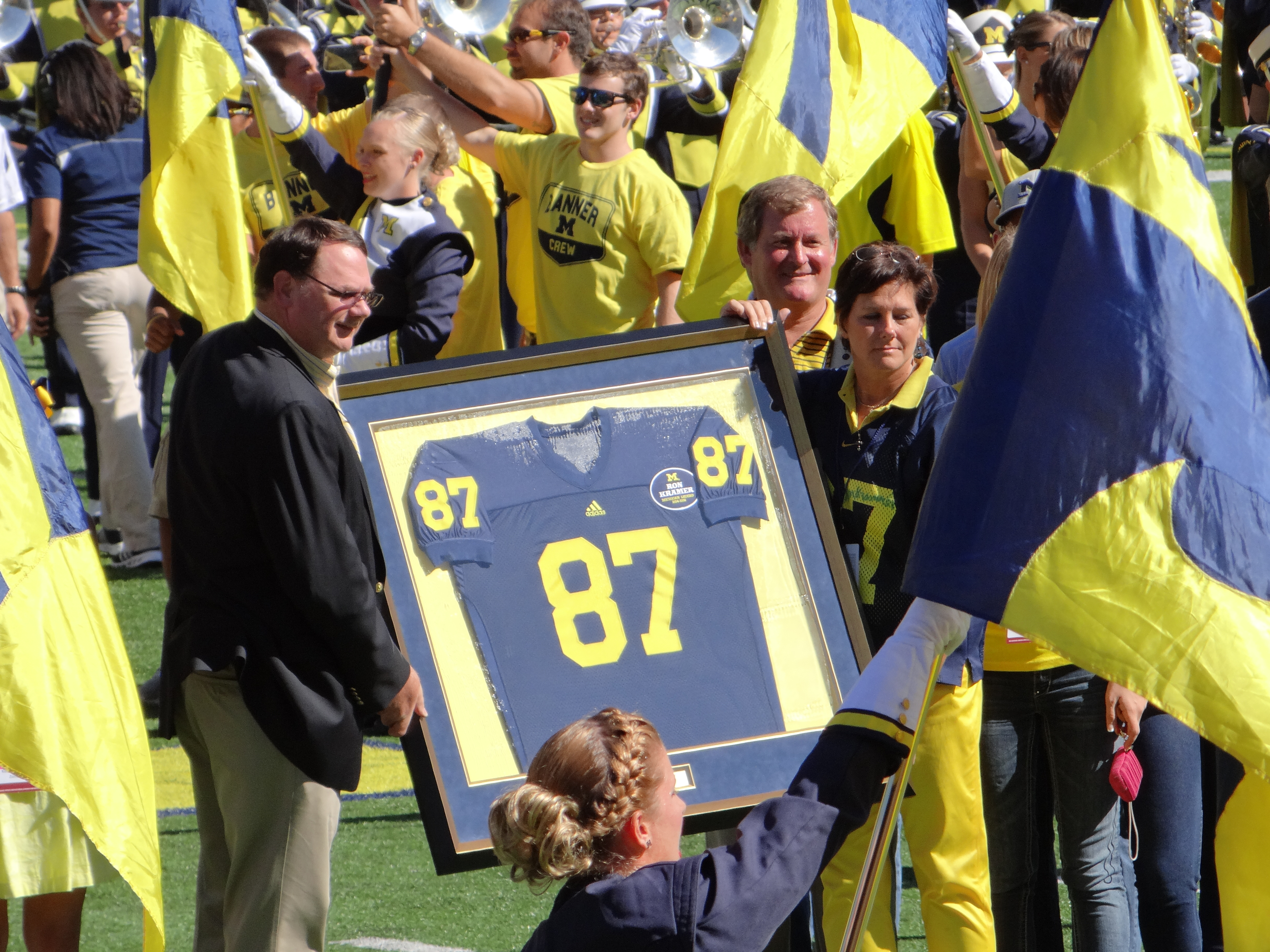
Legends ceremony for Ron Kramer

Following its game against Air Force, Michigan hosted the Massachusetts (UMass) Minutemen for the first time since 2010. In the previous meeting, Michigan won 42–37. Prior to the game, Michigan reactivated Ron Kramer's number (#87) and honored him as a Michigan Football Legend. It was given to tight end Brandon Moore.

Michigan dominated the game throughout the game, winning 63–13. Michigan scored twice in the first quarter via a 26-yard touchdown pass from Denard Robinson to Devin Funchess and an 11-yard run from Fitzgerald Toussaint. The teams traded scores in the second quarter. Brendon Levengood kicked a 25-yard field goal for UMass's first points of the game, but Michigan responded with a five-yard touchdown run from Vincent Smith. UMass responded with a Christian Birt 32-yard interception return for a touchdown, but Michigan countered with 42-yard touchdown pass from Robinson to Devin Gardner, and then expanded its lead via a 36-yard run from Robinson. UMass responded with a 32-yard field goal from Levengood (its final points of the game), but Michigan closed the scoring in the first half with a Taylor Lewan fumble recovery in the endzone for a touchdown. Michigan entered halftime with a 42–13 lead. In the second half, Michigan added two scores in the third quarter via an 18-yard Robinson to Roy Roundtree pass and a Vincent Smith nine-yard run, and ended the scoring in the fourth quarter on a one-yard run from Justice Hayes.

Eight different players scored touchdowns for Michigan. Michigan's 63 points were the most points scored since 2010, when the Wolverines defeated Illinois 67–65 in triple overtime. Its 42 first-half points were the most first-half points scored since 2009, when Michigan played Delaware State. Jake Ryan recorded another tackle for a loss, making this game the ninth straight game (dating back to the previous season) in which he has recorded at least one tackle for a loss. Lewan's touchdown was his first career collegiate touchdown. Denard Robinson moved into second place on the list of Michigan's all-time career yardage leaders after the game.

=== At Notre Dame ===
Michigan at Notre Dame
(Michigan – Notre Dame rivalry game)

Team	1	2	3	4	Total
#18 Wolverines	0	0	0	6	6
• #11 Fighting Irish	0	10	0	3	13

- Date: September 22
- Location: Notre Dame Stadium
  South Bend, Indiana
- Game start: 7:40 p.m. EDT
- Elapsed time: 3:10
- Game attendance: 80,975
- Game weather: 53 °F (12 °C), Partly cloudy, W 7 mph (11 km/h)
- Referee: Bill LeMonnier
- TV announcers (NBC): Tom Hammond, Mike Mayock & Alex Flanagan

Scoring summary
2	10:09	ND	Kyle Brindza 33-yard field goal	ND 3–0
2	1:21	ND	Tommy Rees 1-yard run	ND 10–0
4	13:10	MICH	Brendan Gibbons 33-yard field goal	ND 10–3
4	6:46	ND	Kyle Brindza 39-yard field goal	ND 13–3
4	3:27	MICH	Brendan Gibbons 31-yard field goal	ND 13–6

Following its meeting with UMass, Michigan traveled to South Bend to face the Notre Dame Fighting Irish. In the previous meeting—the first ever night game at Michigan Stadium—Michigan came back from a 17-point deficit to lead Notre Dame 28–24 with 1:12 remaining, and after surrendering a touchdown with 30 seconds remaining, beat Notre Dame 35–31 on a Denard Robinson to Roy Roundtree touchdown pass with two seconds remaining in the game.

Notre Dame won a turnover filled game, 13–6. After a scoreless first quarter, Notre Dame opened the scoring with a 33-yard field goal from Kyle Brindza and added to its lead before halftime via a two-yard touchdown run from Tommy Rees. Notre Dame led 10–0 at halftime. After a scoreless third quarter, Michigan scored its first points of the game via a 33-yard field goal from Brendan Gibbons. Notre Dame responded with a 39-yard field goal from Kyle Brindza, but Michigan added another field goal—a 31-yard kick from Gibbons—to cut the lead to seven. Notre Dame was able to run out the clock on the ensuing drive, ending the game and ending a three-game losing streak to Michigan.

Denard Robinson moved into first place on Michigan's career total yardage list, passing Chad Henne, but accounted for five of Michigan's six turnovers with four interceptions and a fumble. His 1,197 yards of offense against Notre Dame makes him the opponent to have gained the most yards against Notre Dame in history. Kenny Demens and Jordan Kovacs led Michigan's defense with seven tackles each.

=== At Purdue ===
Michigan at Purdue

Team	1	2	3	4	Total
• Wolverines	7	21	3	13	44
Boilermakers	0	10	0	3	13

- Date: October 6
- Location: Ross–Ade Stadium
  West Lafayette, Indiana
- Game start: 4:00 p.m. EDT
- Elapsed time: 3:00
- Game attendance: 50,105
- Game weather: 48 °F (9 °C), Sunny, NW 10 mph (16 km/h)
- Referee: Bill LeMonnier
- TV announcers (BTN): Eric Collins, Derek Rackley & J Leman

Scoring summary
1	4:40	MICH	Fitzgerald Toussaint 1-yard run (Brendan Gibbons kick)	MICH 7–0
2	14:28	MICH	Fitzgerald Toussaint 1-yard run (Brendan Gibbons kick)	MICH 14–0
2	12:43	MICH	Ramon Taylor 63-yard interception return (Brendan Gibbons kick)	MICH 21–0
2	7:01	PUR	Paul Griggs 40-yard field goal	MICH 21–3
2	3:14	MICH	Devin Gardner 23-yard pass from Denard Robinson (Brendan Gibbons kick)	MICH 28–3
2	:10	PUR	O.J. Ross 4-yard pass from Caleb TerBush (Paul Griggs kick)	MICH 28–10
3	6:37	MICH	Brendan Gibbons 29-yard field goal	MICH 31–10
4	12:46	PUR	Paul Griggs 37-yard field goal	MICH 31–13
4	10:14	MICH	Brendan Gibbons 42-yard field goal	MICH 34–13
4	6:02	MICH	Brendan Gibbons 27-yard field goal	MICH 37–13
4	2:04	MICH	Thomas Rawls 7-yard run (Brendan Gibbons kick)	MICH 44–13

After its trip to South Bend, and its bye week, Michigan traveled to West Lafayette, Indiana to face the Purdue Boilermakers. In the previous meeting, Michigan dominated Purdue and won by a score of 36–14.

Michigan again dominated the game, winning 44–13. Michigan scored the only points of the first quarter on a one-yard touchdown run from Fitzgerald Toussaint. Michigan then extended its lead in the second quarter with another one-yard touchdown run from Toussaint and then via 63-yard interception return from Ramon Taylor. Purdue responded with a 40-yard field goal from Paul Griggs, but Michigan extended its lead on a 23-yard touchdown pass from Denard Robinson to Devin Gardner. Purdue ended the first half scoring with its only touchdown of the game, a four-yard pass from Caleb TerBush to O.J. Ross. The only points in the third quarter came from Michigan via a 37-yard field goal from Gibbons. In the fourth quarter, Griggs kicked a 37-yard field goal for Purdue, but Michigan responded with two field goals of its own from Gibbons: one from 42 yards and one from 27 yards. Michigan's final points came from on a Thomas Rawls seven-yard touchdown run.

Denard Robinson became the Big Ten's all-time leading rusher as a quarterback with his 235-yard performance, passing Antwaan Randle El in the process. The game was also Robinson's fifth game of more than 200 yards rushing, which tied Mike Hart as the leader for most 200 yard games. Michigan's opening drive lasted 17 plays and 8:48 in time of possession. Michigan has now won 30 of its last 31 Big Ten openers, including its last seven. Robinson was named the Maxwell Award's player of the week and Manning Award Player of the Week (with a record setting vote total) for his efforts during the game. Robinson also earned a ninth career Big Ten Offensive Player of the Week award, which tied Ron Dayne's career record.

=== Vs. Illinois ===
Illinois at Michigan
(Homecoming game)

Team	1	2	3	4	Total
Fighting Illini	0	0	0	0	0
• #25 Wolverines	10	7	21	7	45

- Date: October 13 Final Score: 45–0
- Location: Michigan Stadium
  Ann Arbor, Michigan
- Game start: 3:35 p.m. EDT
- Elapsed time: 2:57
- Game attendance: 110,922
- Game weather: 57 °F (14 °C), Overcast with rain, SE 15 mph (24 km/h)
- Referee: John O'Neill
- TV announcers (ABC/ESPN): Bob Wischusen, Danny Kanell & Lewis Johnson

Scoring summary
1	8:12 Team=MICH	{{{Team}}}	Jeremy Gallon 71-yard touchdown pass from Denard Robinson (Brendan Gibbons kick)	MICH 7–0
1	:54	MICH	Brendan Gibbons 18-yard field goal	MICH 10–0
2	4:41	MICH	Denard Robinson 6-yard run (Brendan Gibbons kick)	MICH 17–0
3	12:11	MICH	Denard Robinson 49-yard run (Brendan Gibbons kick)	MICH 24–0
3	10:10	MICH	Devin Funchess 8-yard pass from Denard Robinson (Brendan Gibbons kick)	MICH 31–0
3	3:43	MICH	Fitzgerald Toussaint 2-yard run (Brendan Gibbons kick)	MICH 38–0
4	6:01	MICH	Thomas Rawls 65-yard run (Brendan Gibbons kick)	MICH 45–0

Following its trip to West Lafayette, Michigan returned home for its homecoming game against the Illinois Fighting Illini. In the previous meeting, Michigan won by a score of 31–14. Prior to the game, Michigan reactivated Gerald Ford's number (#48) and honored him as a Michigan Football Legend. Linebacker Desmond Morgan was given the number following its reactivation.

Michigan shut out Illinois, winning 45–0. In the first quarter, Jeremy Gallon caught a 71-yard touchdown pass from Denard Robinson to open the scoring for Michigan. Brendan Gibbons followed that with an 18-yard field goal. The only scoring in the second quarter came on a six-yard run from Robinson. In the third quarter, Robinson scored on a 49-yard run and then threw an eight-yard touchdown pass to Devin Funchess. Fitzgerald Toussaint ended the third quarter scoring with a two-yard run. Michigan's final points came in the fourth quarter on a 65-yard run from Thomas Rawls.

The shutout was Michigan's first since its 58–0 victory against Minnesota in 2011. Denard Robinson became the eighth player in NCAA history to rush for 40 touchdowns and pass for 40 touchdowns in his career. Nine different players recorded receptions during the game, while Jake Ryan recorded 11 tackles, including three and a half tackles for a loss. Russell Bellomy and Jack Kennedy both completed their first career collegiate passes during the fourth quarter. Ryan was named the Big Ten's defensive player of the week for his efforts.

=== Vs. Michigan State ===
Michigan State at Michigan
(Paul Bunyan Trophy)

Team	1	2	3	4	Total
Spartans	0	0	7	3	10
• #23 Wolverines	0	6	0	6	12

- Date: October 20
- Location: Michigan Stadium
  Ann Arbor, Michigan
- Game start: 3:31 p.m. EDT
- Elapsed time: 3:12
- Game attendance: 113,833
- Game weather: 55 °F (13 °C), Cloudy, W 15 mph (24 km/h)
- Referee: Dave Witvoet
- TV announcers (BTN): Matt Devlin, Glen Mason & J Leman

Scoring summary
2	10:20	MICH	Brendan Gibbons 24-yard field goal	MICH 3–0
2	1:07	MICH	Matt Wile 48-yard field goal	MICH 6–0
3	7:19	MSU	Paul Lang 2-yard pass from Andrew Maxwell (Dan Conroy kick)	MSU 7–6
4	13:37	MICH	Brendan Gibbons 21-yard field goal	MICH 9–7
4	5:48	MSU	Dan Conroy 19-yard field goal	MSU 10–9
4	:05	MICH	Brendan Gibbons 38-yard field goal	MICH 12–10

After homecoming against Illinois, Michigan hosted its in-state rival, the Michigan State Spartans, for the Paul Bunyan Trophy. Michigan State won the previous game by a score of 28–14. Michigan honored Willis Ward before the game.

Michigan won a low-scoring defensive battle, 12–10. Following a scoreless first quarter, Michigan opened the scoring in the second quarter with a 24-yard field goal from Brendan Gibbons, and added to its lead before halftime with a 48-yard field goal from Matt Wile. Michigan State scored its first points of the game and took the lead in the third quarter on a two-yard touchdown pass from Andrew Maxwell to Paul Lang. Michigan answered in the fourth quarter and regained the lead via a 21-yard field goal from Gibbons, but Michigan State answered with a 19-yard field goal from Dan Conroy. Michigan won the game with a last minute 38-yard field goal from Gibbons.

With the victory, Michigan became the first team in college football to reach 900 wins in program history. Michigan improved its record to 68–32–5 against Michigan State and recorded its first victory against the Spartans since 2007. This was Michigan's first victory without scoring a touchdown since a 5–0 win against Purdue in 1995. Matt Wile's 48-yard field goal was his first career field goal and Michigan's longest since 2009, when Jason Olesnavege kicked a 51-yard field goal against Purdue. Jordan Kovacs had an interception and posted his 300th career tackle during the game. Desmond Morgan led the Wolverines with 11 tackles. Gibbons was named the Big Ten's Special Teams Player of the Week in recognition of his efforts.

=== At Nebraska ===
Michigan at Nebraska

Team	1	2	3	4	Total
#20 Wolverines	0	6	3	0	9
• Cornhuskers	0	7	9	7	23

- Date: October 27
- Location: Memorial Stadium
  Lincoln, Nebraska
- Game start: 8:01 p.m. EDT
- Elapsed time: 3:15
- Game attendance: 86,160
- Game weather: 41 °F (5 °C), Cloudy, SW 13 mph (21 km/h)
- Referee: Dan Capron
- TV announcers (ESPN2): Mark Jones, Brock Huard & Jessica Mendoza

Scoring summary
2	13:17	NEB	Kenny Bell 37-yard pass from Taylor Martinez (Brett Maher kick)	NEB 7–0
2	8:21	MICH	Brendan Gibbons 52-yard field goal	NEB 7–3
2	2:38	MICH	Brendan Gibbons 24-yard field goal	NEB 7–6
3	11:48	NEB	Brett Maher 19-yard field goal	NEB 10–6
3	8:41	NEB	Brett Maher 51-yard field goal	NEB 13–6
3	4:43	NEB	Brett Maher 31-field goal	NEB 16–6
3	5:31	MICH	Brendan Gibbons 38-yard field goal	NEB 16–9
4	10:19	NEB	Ameer Abdullah 12-yard run (Brett Maher kick)	NEB 23–9

Following its clash with Michigan State, Michigan traveled to Lincoln for the first time since 1911 to face the Nebraska Cornhuskers. Michigan dominated the previous meeting, winning 45–17.

Following an injury to Denard Robinson in the first half, Nebraska controlled the game and won 23–9. After a scoreless first quarter, Nebraska opened the scoring in the second quarter with a 37-yard touchdown pass from Taylor Martinez to Kenny Bell. Michigan responded with two Brendan Gibbons field goals before halftime, one from 52 yards and one from 24 yards. In the third quarter, Nebraska added three field goals from Brett Maher, from 19, 51, and 31 yards respectively. Michigan answered with a 38-yard field goal from Brendan Gibbons. Nebraska ended the scoring in the fourth quarter on a 12-yard touchdown run from Ameer Abdullah.

The attendance of 86,160 was the second largest in Memorial Stadium history. Gibbons' 52-yard field goal was a career long and was the longest by a Michigan kicker since 2001, when Hayden Epstein kicked a 57-yard field goal against Michigan State. Craig Roh posted two tackles-for-a-loss, including one sack. Kenny Demens led the team with ten tackles.

=== At Minnesota ===
Michigan at Minnesota
(Little Brown Jug)

Team	1	2	3	4	Total
• Wolverines	0	14	7	14	35
Golden Gophers	0	7	0	6	13

- Date: November 3
- Location: TCF Bank Stadium
  Minneapolis
- Game start: 12:01 p.m. EDT
- Elapsed time: 3:09
- Game attendance: 48,801
- Game weather: 37 °F (3 °C), Overcast, E 5 mph (8.0 km/h)
- Referee: Todd Geerlings
- TV announcers (BTN): Kevin Kugler, Chris Martin & Jon Jansen

Scoring summary
2	14:55	MINN	John Rabe 10-yard pass from Philip Nelson (Jordan Wettstein kick)	MINN 7–0
2	7:50	MICH	Drew Dileo 47-yard pass from Devin Gardner (Brendan Gibbons kick)	Tie 7–7
2	:45	MICH	Thomas Rawls 2-yard run (Brendan Gibbons Kick)	MICH 14–7
3	5:05	MICH	Jeremy Gallon 10-yard pass from Devin Gardner (Brendan Gibbons kick)	MICH 21–7
4	13:50	MINN	Jordan Wettstein 26-yard field goal	MICH 21–10
4	9:17	MICH	Devin Gardner 2-yard run (Brendan Gibbons kick)	MICH 28–10
4	5:31	MINN	Jordan Wettstein 19-yard field goal	MICH 28–13
4	3:05	MICH	Fitzgerald Toussaint 41-yard run (Brendan Gibbons kick)	MICH 35–13

After its trip to Lincoln, Michigan traveled to Minneapolis to meet the Minnesota Golden Gophers in the annual battle for the Little Brown Jug. In the previous meeting, Michigan posted its first shutout since 2007, beating the Golden Gophers 58–0. The 2012 game was Michigan's first at TCF Bank Stadium, which opened in 2009.

With Devin Gardner starting his first game as Michigan's quarterback, the Wolverines dominated the Golden Gophers and won the game, 35–13. Following a scoreless first quarter, Minnesota opened the scoring with a ten-yard touchdown pass from Philip Nelson to John Rabe. Michigan responded with a 47-yard touchdown pass from Gardner to Drew Dileo. Michigan added to its lead with a two-yard touchdown run from Thomas Rawls shortly before halftime. Michigan scored only points of the third quarter on a ten-yard touchdown pass from Gardner to Jeremy Gallon. Minnesota answered with a 26-yard field goal from Jordan Wettstein, but Michigan expanded its lead with a two-yard touchdown run from Devin Gardner. Minnesota responded with a 19-yard field goal from Wettstein. Michigan ended the scoring with a 41-yard touchdown run from Fitzgerald Toussaint.

Gardner made his first career start at quarterback in place of Denard Robinson, who sustained an injury to his ulnar nerve in the previous week's game against Nebraska. Michigan sustained two drives of 90 or more yards for only the second time in program history; it was the first time this had occurred on consecutive drives. This game was the sixth time in the season in which Michigan held an opponent to 13 points or less. Kenny Demens led the team with ten tackles and a tackle for a loss. Jake Ryan had nine tackles, with three of those for a loss. The game was Michigan's first in Minnesota that had been played outdoors in 41 years.

=== Vs. Northwestern ===
Northwestern at Michigan

Team	1	2	3	4	OT	Total
Wildcats	7	7	10	7	0	31
• Wolverines	7	7	7	10	7	38

- Date: November 10
- Location: Michigan Stadium
  Ann Arbor, Michigan
- Game start: 12:01 p.m. EST
- Elapsed time: 3:28
- Game attendance: 112,510
- Game weather: 55 °F (13 °C), Cloudy, SSE 7 mph (11 km/h)
- Referee: Alex Kemp
- TV announcers (ESPN): Dave Pasch, Brian Griese & Jenn Brown

Scoring summary
1	8:19	NW	Venric Mark 3-yard run (Jeff Budzien kick)	NW 7–0
1	2:27	MICH	Devin Gardner 8-yard run (Brendan Gibbons kick)	Tie 7–7
2	6:17	MICH	Thomas Rawls 1-yard run (Brendan Gibbons kick)	MICH 14–7
2	:25	NW	Cameron Dickerson 19-yard pass from Trevor Siemian (Jeff Budzien kick)	Tie 14–14
3	11:00	NW	Dan Vitale 23-yard pass from Kain Colter (Jeff Budzien kick)	NW 21–14
3	3:57	NW	Jeff Budzien 34-yard field goal	NW 24–14
3	1:43	MICH	Fitzgerald Toussaint 28-yard pass from Devin Gardner (Brendan Gibbons kick)	NW 24–21
4	8:45	MICH	Devin Funchess 8-yard pass from Devin Gardner (Brendan Gibbons kick)	MICH 28–24
4	3:59	NW	Tony Jones 15-yard pass from Trevor Siemian (Jeff Budzien kick)	NW 31–28
4	:02	MICH	Brendan Gibbons 26-yard field goal	Tie 31–31
OT		MICH	Devin Gardner 1-yard run (Brendan Gibbons)	MICH 38–31

Following its game against Minnesota, Michigan returned to Ann Arbor to face the Northwestern Wildcats. Michigan rallied to win the previous meeting 42–24 after being down 24–14 at halftime. Prior to the game, Michigan reactivated the previously retired jersey (#11) that had been worn by the three Wistert brothers (Francis, Alvin and Albert) as a Michigan Football Legends jersey. Jordan Kovacs was given the number to wear for the remainder of his career.

Michigan won the game 38–31 in overtime. Northwestern opened the scoring in the first quarter on a three-yard touchdown run by Venric Mark, but Michigan tied the score on an eight-yard touchdown run from Devin Gardner. In the second quarter, Michigan took a 14–7 lead on a one-yard touchdown run from Thomas Rawls, but Northwestern tied the score on a 19-yard touchdown pass from Trevor Siemian to Cameron Dickerson. Northwestern regained the lead in the third quarter on a 23-yard pass from Kain Colter to Dan Vitale, and then expanded its lead on a 34-yard field goal from Jeff Budzien. Michigan responded with a 28-yard touchdown pass from Gardner to Fitzgerald Toussaint and then regained the lead in the fourth quarter on an eight-yard touchdown pass from Gardner to Devin Funchess. Northwestern regained the lead on a 15-yard touchdown pass from Siemian to Tony Jones. With 18 second remaining, Gardner completed a 53-yard pass to Roy Roundtree at the Northwestern eight-yard line. Brendan Gibbons tied the game on a 26-yard field goal with two seconds remaining. Michigan scored the only points of the overtime period on a one-yard touchdown run by Gardner.

Michigan improved its record to 8–1 overall in overtime games and 4–0 in home overtime games. It was Michigan's first overtime game since the 2012 Sugar Bowl and the first home overtime game since the game against Illinois in 2010. Northwestern's touchdown on its opening drive was the first opening drive touchdown Michigan allowed during the 2012 season. Gardner completed 16 of 29 passes for two touchdowns and a career-high 286 yards. Roundtree caught five passes for 139 receiving yards, and Jeremy Gallon caught seven passes for 94 yards. Fitzgerald Toussaint contributed 93 rushing yards and 28 receiving yards. Thomas Gordon led the defense with 11 tackles, while Craig Roh added one sack for the Wolverines. Kenny Demens had nine tackles for Michigan. Gardner was named the Big Ten's Co-Offensive Player of the Week for his efforts. Gardner was also named the Manning Award Player of the Week.

=== Vs. Iowa ===
Iowa at Michigan

Team	1	2	3	4	Total
Hawkeyes	7	3	0	7	17
• #23 Wolverines	7	21	14	0	42

- Date: November 17
- Location: Michigan Stadium
  Ann Arbor, Michigan
- Game start: 12:01 p.m. EST
- Elapsed time: 3:06
- Game attendance: 113,016
- Game weather: 55 °F (13 °C), Partly cloudy, calm
- Referee: Dennis Lipski
- TV announcers (ESPN): Dave Pasch, Brian Griese & Jenn Brown

Scoring summary
1	8:27	MICH	Devin Gardner 1-yard run (Brendan Gibbons kick)	MICH 7–0
1	1:44	IOWA	Coble Krieger 16-yard pass from James Vandenberg (Mike Myer kick)	Tie 7–7
2	13:05	MICH	Roy Roundtree 37-yard touchdown pass from Devin Gardner (Brendan Gibbons kick)	MICH 14–7
2	9:26	IOWA	Mike Myer 27-yard field goal	MICH 14–10
2	5:20	MICH	Devin Gardner 1-yard run (Brendan Gibbons kick)	MICH 21–10
2	:40	MICH	Vincent Smith 18-yard pass from Devin Gardner (Brendan Gibbons kick)	MICH 28–10
3	8:41	MICH	Devin Gardner 3-yard run (Brendan Gibbons kick)	MICH 35–10
3	4:33	MICH	Devin Funchess 29-yard pass from Devin Gardner (Brendan Gibbons kick)	MICH 42–10
4	2:12	IOWA	Mark Weisman 13-yard pass from James Vandenberg (Mike Myer kick)	MICH 42–17

After its game against Northwestern, Michigan completed the home portion of its schedule against the Iowa Hawkeyes. Iowa won the previous meeting, 24–16, and had won three straight games against Michigan. Michigan had last beaten Iowa in the 2006 season. Michigan honored former coach Gary Moeller during the game.

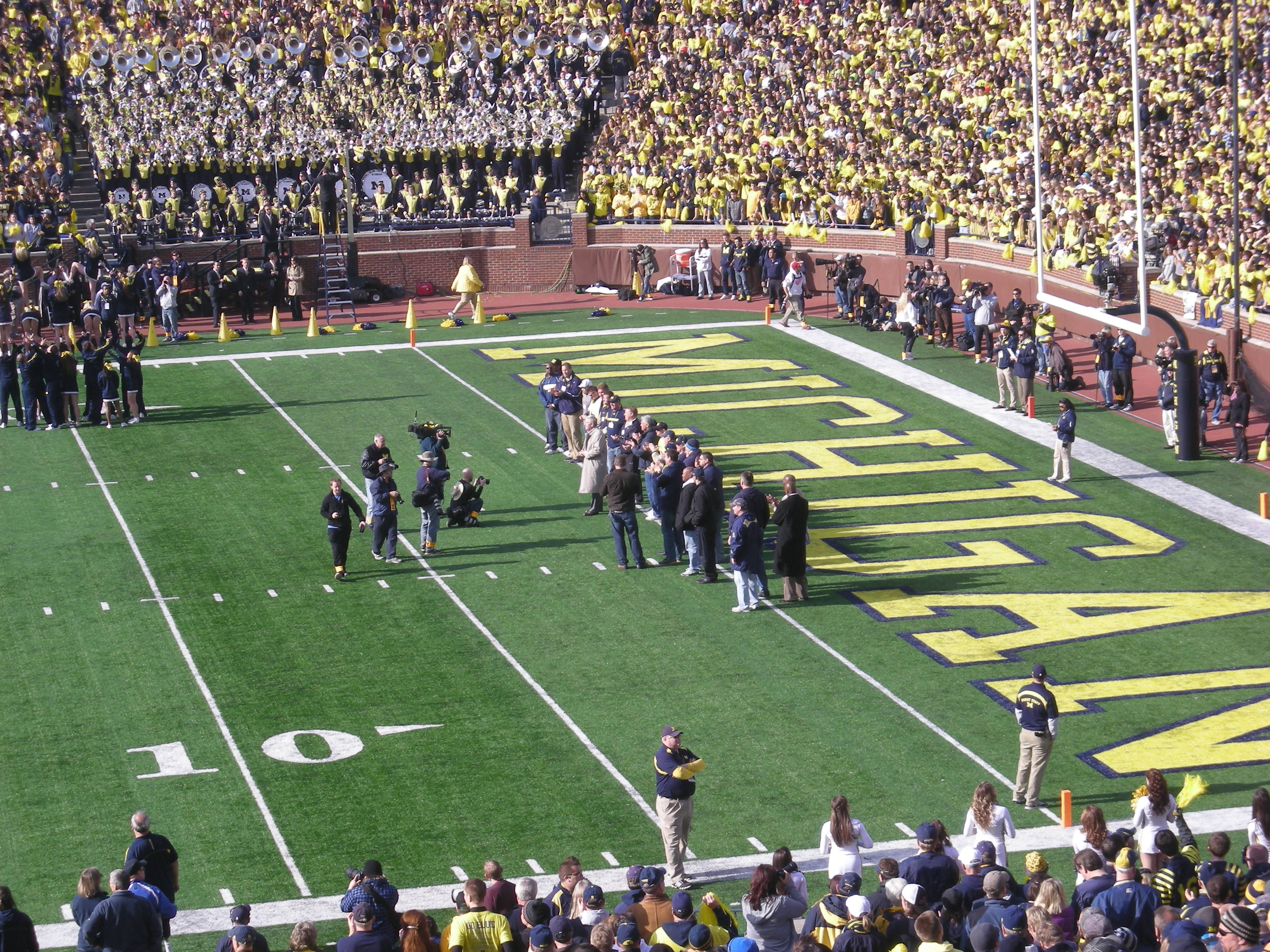
Michigan honors Gary Moeller and his teams during the first quarter.

Michigan won the game, 42–17. On Michigan's opening drive, running back Fitzgerald Toussaint sustained a leg injury which required surgery later in the day. The Wolverines went on to score a touchdown on the opening drive on a one-yard run from Devin Gardner. Iowa tied the score on the following drive on a 16-yard touchdown pass from James Vandenburg to Coble Krieger. Michigan scored three touchdowns in the second quarter, starting with a 37-yard touchdown pass from Gardner to Roy Roundtree followed by a one-yard run from Gardner and an 18-yard pass from Gardner to Vincent Smith. Iowa was limited to a field goal in the second quarter, and Michigan led 28–10 at halftime. Michigan added two touchdowns in the third quarter on a three-yard touchdown run from Gardner and a 29-yard touchdown pass from Gardner to Devin Funchess. Iowa ended the scoring with a 13-yard touchdown run from Mark Weisman.

Devin Gardner accounted for all six of Michigan's touchdowns, three rushing and three passing, and became the first Michigan player to account for six touchdowns in a game since Steve Smith accomplished the feat against Minnesota in 1983. Gardner completed 18 of 23 passes for 314 yards and three touchdowns. He also rushed for 37 yards and scored three touchdowns. His total of 314 passing yards ranks 16th all-time in Michigan's record book for a single game. Jeremy Gallon led the receivers with five passes for 133 yards. On defense, Joe Bolden recorded two tackles-for-loss, while Kenny Demens also had a tackle-for-loss. Denard Robinson returned after missing the two previous games with an injury to the ulnar nerve in his right elbow, started at running back, and also played quarterback and wide receiver, recording two catches for 24 yards and rushing 13 times for 98 yards. Gardner was named the Big Ten's Co-Offensive Player of the Week for his efforts, while James Ross was named the Big Ten's Co-Freshman of the Week for his performance. Gardner was also named the Manning Award Player of the Week.

=== At Ohio State ===
Michigan at Ohio State
(The Game)

Team	1	2	3	4	Total
#20 Wolverines	7	14	0	0	21
• #4 Buckeyes	10	10	3	3	26

- Date: November 24
- Location: Ohio Stadium
  Columbus, Ohio
- Game start: 12:08 p.m. EST
- Elapsed time: 3:11
- Game attendance: 105,899
- Game weather: 33 °F (1 °C), Cloudy with flurries, W 17 mph (27 km/h)
- Referee: John O'Neill
- TV announcers (ABC): Sean McDonough, Chris Spielman & Quint Kessenich

Scoring summary
1	12:41	OSU	Carlos Hyde 3-yard run (Drew Basil kick)	OSU 7–0
1	7:10	MICH	Roy Roundtree 75-yard pass from Devin Gardner (Brendan Gibbons kick)	Tie 7–7
1	:37	OSU	Drew Basil 41-yard field goal	OSU 10–7
2	11:48	MICH	Devin Gardner 2-yard run (Brendan Gibbons kick)	MICH 14–10
2	1:30	OSU	Corey Brown 14-yard pass from Braxton Miller (Drew Basil kick)	OSU 17–14
2	:40	MICH	Denard Robinson 67-yard run (Brendan Gibbons kick)	MICH 21–17
2	:00	OSU	Drew Basil 52-yard field goal	MICH 21–20
3	8:12	OSU	Drew Basil 28-yard field goal	OSU 23–21
4	6:26	OSU	Drew Basil 25-yard field goal	OSU 26–21

Following its home finale against Iowa, Michigan traveled to Columbus to face arch-rival Ohio State in the 109th meeting of "The Game". Michigan snapped its seven-game losing streak to the Buckeyes the previous year, winning 40–34.

Michigan lost 26–21 after leading 21–20 at halftime, ensuring they would not have a share of the Legends Division title. Ohio State opened the scoring on its opening drive with a three-yard touchdown run from Carlos Hyde. Michigan responded later in the first quarter with a 75-yard touchdown pass from Devin Gardner to Roy Roundtree. Ohio State responded with a 37-yard field goal from Drew Basil and led 10–7 after one quarter. Michigan took the lead in the second quarter with a two-yard run from Devin Gardner, but Ohio State regained the lead with 1:30 left in the half via a 14-yard pass from Braxton Miller to Corey Brown. Michigan regained the lead with :47 seconds left on a Denard Robinson 67-yard touchdown run. Ohio State ended the half with a 52-yard field goal from Basil, which cut Michigan's lead to 21–20 halftime. Ohio State scored the only points of the second half on two Basil field goals: a 28-yard field goal in the third quarter and a 25-yard field goal in the fourth quarter.

With his 67-yard touchdown run, Denard Robinson became Michigan's all-time touchdown leader with 91 total touchdowns, passing Chad Henne. He also passed Brad Smith for second place on the all-time quarterback rush list, trailing only Pat White. Roy Roundtree recorded his third straight game with at least 80 receiving yards. Jake Ryan forced two fumbles, setting a new Michigan single season record with five forced fumbles. Desmond Morgan led the defense with 11 tackles, while Will Campbell recorded ten tackles. Craig Roh made his 50th straight start, tying Jon Jansen for the school record of most career starts.

=== Vs. South Carolina ===
Michigan vs South Carolina
(Outback Bowl)

Team	1	2	3	4	Total
• #11 Gamecocks	14	7	0	12	33
#19 Wolverines	3	10	9	6	28

- Date: January 1
- Location: Raymond James Stadium
  Tampa, Florida
- Game start: 1:00 p.m. EST
- Elapsed time: 3:45
- Game attendance: 54,527
- Game weather: 75 °F (24 °C), Sunny, SW 12 mph (19 km/h)
- Referee: Jeff Maconaghy
- TV announcers (ESPN): Mike Tirico, Jon Gruden & Shannon Spake

Scoring summary
1	13:26	SCAR	Damiere Byrd 56-yard pass from Connor Shaw (Adam Yates kick)	SCAR 7–0
1	7:28	MICH	Brendan Gibbons 39-yard field goal	SCAR 7–3
1	3:29	SCAR	Ace Sanders 63-yard punt return (Adam Yates kick)	SCAR 14–3
2	12:41	MICH	Drew Dileo 5-yard pass from Devin Gardner (Brendan Gibbons kick)	SCAR 14–10
2	10:54	SCAR	Ace Sanders 4-yard pass from Dylan Thompson (Adam Yates kick)	SCAR 21–10
2	2:47	MICH	Brendan Gibbons 40-yard field goal	SCAR 21–13
3	6:54	MICH	Matt Wile 52-yard field goal	SCAR–21-16
3	:02	MICH	Jeremy Gallon 10-yard pass from Devin Gardner (Two-point conversion attempt failed)	MICH 22–21
4	8:06	SCAR	Ace Sanders 31-yard pass from Connor Shaw (Two-point conversion attempt failed)	SCAR 27–22
4	3:29	MICH	Jeremy Gallon 17-yard pass from Devin Gardner (Two-point conversion attempt failed)	MICH 28–27
4	:11	SCAR	Bruce Ellington 32-yard pass from Dylan Thompson (Two-point conversion attempt failed)	SCAR 33–28

On December 2, Michigan was selected to play in the Outback Bowl in Tampa, Florida against the South Carolina Gamecocks. This was the first meeting between the two schools since Michigan traveled to South Carolina in 1985, which Michigan won 34–3, and Michigan's first trip to the Outback Bowl since 2003, when Michigan defeated Florida 38–30. Junior starting fullback Stephen Hopkins left the team prior to the bowl game after not regaining his starting role following recovery from a midseason injury, while J.T. Floyd, Brandin Hawthorne, and Will Hagerup were suspended for the game for a violation of team rules.

Michigan lost 33–28 on a last minute touchdown from Dylan Thompson to Bruce Ellington. South Carolina opened the scoring in the first quarter via a 56-yard touchdown pass from Connor Shaw to Damiere Byrd. Michigan responded with a 39-yard field goal from Brendan Gibbons, but South Carolina extended its lead to 11 points from an Ace Sanders 63-yard punt return for a touchdown. Michigan answered with a 5-yard touchdown pass from Devin Gardner to Drew Dileo in the second quarter, making the score 14–10, but South Carolina responded with a 4-yard pass from Thompson to Sanders. Gibbons added a 40-yard field goal for Michigan before halftime, making the score 21–13 at halftime. Michigan scored the first points of the second half in the third quarter on a 52-yard field goal from Matt Wile and then added another touchdown via a 10-yard pass from Gardner to Jeremy Gallon, making the score 22–21 after a failed two-point conversion attempt. South Carolina responded with a 31-yard touchdown pass from Shaw to Sanders, but its two-point conversion attempt also failed. Michigan regained the lead 28–27 via a 15-yard touchdown pass from Gardner to Gallon, but once again failed on its two-point conversion attempt. South Carolina ended the scoring with 11 seconds left on a 32-yard touchdown pass from Thompson to Ellington, and also saw its two-point conversion attempt fail.

Michigan's bowl record fell to 20–22 and 3–2 in the Outback Bowl. Denard Robinson broke the all-time record for quarterback rushing yards with his 100-yard performance, eclipsing Pat White's record of 4,480 yards, and setting the new record at 4,495 yards. Robinson also finished second in rushing in school history with only Mike Hart's 5,040 yards surpassing Robinson's rushing total of 4,495 yards. Gallon's nine receptions and 145 receiving yards were both career highs. Jake Ryan recorded one and a half tackles for a loss, including half of a sack. Wile's 52-yard field goal was a career long and set a record for the longest field goal in the Outback Bowl, surpassing Philip Doyle's record of 51 yards for Alabama in 1988.

== Awards and honors ==
Taylor Lewan was named to Sports Illustrated's midseason All-American team. On September 18, Patrick Omameh was named to the Allstate American Football Coaches Association (AFCA) Good Works Team. On October 22, Denard Robinson was named a Davey O'Brien Award semifinalist. On November 1, Denard Robinson was named one of 10 finalists for the 2012 Johnny Unitas Golden Arm Award. On November 5, Brendan Gibbons was named a Lou Groza Award semifinalist. On November 13, Patrick Omameh was named a finalist for the 2012 Pop Warner National College Football Award. On November 27, Jordan Kovacs was named a finalist for the Burlsworth Trophy.

Lewan was named Big Ten Conference Offensive lineman of the Year, while Will Hagerup was the Conference Punter of the Year. Lewan and Omameh were named first team All-Big Ten by the coaches. Lewan and Hagerup were named first team by the media, while Craig Roh and Jordan Kovacs were second team by the coaches. Jake Ryan was named second team by the media. J. T. Floyd, Jeremy Gallon, Brendan Gibbons, Hagerup, Roy Roundtree, and Ryan were coaches honorable mention, while Will Campbell, Floyd, Devin Funchess, Gallon, Gibbons, Kovacs, Omameh, Robinson, Roh and Roundtree were honorable mention by the media. Lewan was a 2012 College Football All-America Team selection by the Associated Press (1st team), ESPN (1st team), Walter Camp Football Foundation (1st team), Lindy's Sports (1st team), Sports Illustrated (1st team), CBSSports.com (2nd team), FoxSportsNext.com (Scout.com 2nd team), and Pro Football Weekly (honorable mention). CBSSports.com also named Lewan along with Hagerup to their All-Big Ten team. Kovacs earned team MVP for the season. Lewan was named Big Ten Conference Offensive Lineman of the Year, while Will Hagerup was the Conference Punter of the Year. Lewan and Omameh were named first team All-Big Ten by the coaches. Lewan and Hagerup were named first team by the media, while Craig Roh and Jordan Kovacs were second team by the coaches. Jake Ryan was named second team by the media. J. T. Floyd, Jeremy Gallon, Brendan Gibbons, Hagerup, Roy Roundtree, and Ryan were coaches honorable mention, while Will Campbell, Floyd, Devin Funchess, Gallon, Gibbons, Kovacs, Omameh, Robinson, Roh and Roundtree were honorable mention by the media. Lewan was a 2012 College Football All-America Team selection by the Associated Press (1st team), ESPN (1st team), Walter Camp Football Foundation (1st team), Lindy's Sports (1st team), Sports Illustrated (1st team), CBSSports.com (2nd team), FoxSportsNext.com (Scout.com 2nd team), and Pro Football Weekly (honorable mention). CBSSports.com also named Lewan along with Hagerup to their All-Big Ten team. Kovacs earned team MVP for the season. 60 Minutes aired a 13-minute college football segment hosted by Armen Keteyian on November 18 that featured Michigan football. Athletic director Dave Brandon, Brady Hoke, Denard Robinson and Jordan Kovacs were interviewed. Only Brandon, Hoke and Robinson appeared in the on air segment and its online extra companion piece.

The following players were Academic All-Big Ten: Courtney Avery, Brennen Beyer, Seth Broekhuizen, Joey Burzynski, Jareth Glanda, Jeremy Jackson, Joe Kerridge, Jordan Kovacs, Mike Kwiatkowski, Desmond Morgan, Patrick Omameh, Joe Reynolds, Craig Roh, Matt Wile, Steve Wilson, and Charlie Zeller. Devin Funchess was a College Football News and FoxSportsNext Freshman All-America Second Team selection (behind Penn State's Kyle Carter). Robinson played in the 2013 Senior Bowl. Campbell and Roh were invited to the 2013 East–West Shrine Game.

== Statistics ==
Michigan finished the regular season ranked eighth in the Big Ten in total offense and fifth in scoring offense. Defensively, the team finished second in total defense in the Big Ten and 13th in the country, as well as second in the Big Ten in sacks allowed and fifth nationally in pass defense.

Denard Robinson finished third in the conference in rushing with an average of 115.09 yards per game. Dennis Norfleet finished second in the conference with an average of 28.21 yards per kick return. Desmond Morgan led the team in tackles with 7.36 per game, while Jake Ryan finished third in tackles-for-a-loss in the conference with an average of 1.23 tackles-for-a-loss per game. The per game team rankings below include 120 Football Bowl Subdivision teams and 12 Big Ten Conference teams.

Category	National rank	Actual	National leader	Actual	Conference rank	Big Ten Conference leader	Actual
Rushing Offense	41	183.77	Army	369.83	5	Nebraska	253.36
Passing Offense	94	199.31	Marshall	365.08	6	Indiana	311.17
Total offense	78	383.08	Louisiana Tech	577.92	7	Nebraska	460.79
Scoring Offense	57	29.85	Louisiana Tech	51.50	5	Ohio State	37.17
Rushing Defense	51	150.54	Alabama	76.36	6	Michigan State	98.62
Pass Efficiency Defense	50	127.83	Florida State	95.43	9	Michigan State	98.84
Total Defense	13	320.00	Alabama	250.00	2	Michigan State	274.38
Scoring Defense	20	19.85	Alabama	10.93	4	Michigan State	16.31
Net Punting	84	35.70	Louisiana Tech	43.51	8	Illinois	39.22
Punt returns	60	8.81	Boston College	22.87	5	Northwestern	16.55
Kickoff returns	58	22.05	Kansas State	29.24	5	Purdue	22.93
Turnover Margin	99	-.69	Oregon	1.62	10	Northwestern	1.08
Pass Defense	5	169.46	Florida State	161.86	2	Nebraska	168.14
Passing Efficiency	69	131.91	Alabama	174.32	5	Nebraska	140.21
Sacks	T-78	1.69	Stanford	4.07	9	Penn State	2.83
Tackles For Loss	48	6.08	Arizona State	9.00	3	Indiana	7.17
Sacks Allowed	28	1.38	North Texas	.50	2	Northwestern	1.23

The per game rankings below include players who played in 75% of teams' games and were ranked in the top 100 national leaders and top 25 conference leaders:

Category	Player	National rank	Actual	National leader	Actual	Conference rank	Big Ten Conference leader	Actual
Rushing	Denard Robinson	15	115.09	Ka'Deem Carey	148.38	3	Le'Veon Bell	137.92
	Fitzgerald Toussaint		51.40			16		
Passing Efficiency (Min. 15 Att./Game)	Denard Robinson	70	126.64	A. J. McCarron	175.28	6	Martinez (Nebraska)	141.59
Total offense	Denard Robinson	60	235.00	Johnny Manziel	393.54	5	Martinez (Nebraska)	277.86
	Devin Gardner		101.54			15		
	Fitzgerald Toussaint		51.40			25		
Receptions Per Game	Jeremy Gallon		3.77	Tommy Shuler (Marshall)	9.17	T-11	Allen Robinson	6.42
Receiving Yards Per Game	Jeremy Gallon	63.77	Terrence Williams	140.92	4	Robinson (Penn State)	101.51	
	Roy Roundtree		44.62			14		
Interceptions	Thomas Gordon		.15	Phillip Thomas (Fresno State)	.62	T-25	Travis Howard (Ohio State	.33
	Raymon Taylor		.15			T-25		
Punting (Min. 3.6 Punts/Game)				Ryan Allen (Louisiana Tech)	48.04		Mike Sadler (Michigan State)	43.32
Punt returns (Min. 1.2 Ret./Game)				Tramaine Thompson (Kansas State	19.75		Corey Brown (Ohio State)	12.28
Kickoff returns (Min. 1.2 Ret./Game)	Dennis Norfleet	43	23.63	Quincy McDuffie (UCF)	34.24	3	Jordan Cotton (Iowa)	28.21
Field goals	Brendan Gibbons	T-45	1.23	Quinn Sharp	2.15	6	Dan Conroy (Michigan State)	1.77
	Matt Wile		.15			12		
Scoring	T-|83	7.15	Kenneth Dixon (Louisiana Tech)	14.00	8	Carlos Hyde (Ohio State)	10.20	
	Devin Gardner		5.08			20		
	Denard Robinson		3.82			25		
All-Purpose Runners	Denard Robinson	45	117.91	Antonio Andrews (Western Kentucky)	248.08	5	Venrick Mark (Northwestern)	166.62
	Jeremy Gallon		75.77			19		
	Dennis Norfleet		68.69			25		
Sacks	Jake Ryan		.35	Quanterus Smith (Western Kentucky)	1.25	T-18	John Simon (Ohio State)	.82
	Craig Roh		.31			T-24		
Tackles	Desmond Morgan		7.36	Marvin Burdette (UAB)	13.08	14	Anthony Hitchens (Iowa)	11.27
	Jake Ryan		6.77			21		
Tackles For Loss	Jake Ryan	T-32	1.23	Jarvis Jones	2.04	3	Ryan Shazier (Ohio State)	1.42
	Frank Clark		.82			T-17		

== Depth chart ==
Starters and backups against Alabama. Following Blake Countess's injury, Courtney Avery replaced him atop the depth chart beginning in the second week of the season, while Ramon Taylor replaced Avery atop the depth chart beginning in the sixth week of the season. Fitzgerald Toussaint was injured in the win against Iowa and missed the rest of the season. Thomas Rawls replaced him at the top of the depth chart for the final two games of the season. Brandon Moore was injured during the first game of the season, but was not replaced atop the depth chart until Week 10 against Northwestern, which saw Mike Kwiatkowski become the starting tight end.

Defense

FS
Thomas Gordon
Jarrod Wilson
Josh Furman

WLB	MLB	SLB
Desmond Morgan	Kenny Demens	Jake Ryan
James Ross	Joe Bolden	Cam Gordon
Brandin Hawthorne	Mike Jones	⋅

SS
Jordan Kovacs
Marvin Robinson
Floyd Simmons

CB
J.T. Floyd
Ramon Taylor
Delonte Hollowell

DE	DT	DT	DE
Craig Roh	Quinton Washington	Will Campbell	Jibreel Black
Nathan Brink	Richard Ash	Nathan Brink	Brennen Beyer
⋅	⋅	⋅	⋅

CB
Blake Countess
Courtney Avery
Terry Richardson

Offense

WR
Roy Roundtree
Jerald Robinson
Devin Gardner

LT	LG	C	RG	RT
Taylor Lewan	Elliott Mealer	Ricky Barnum	Patrick Omameh	Michael Schofield
Erik Magnuson	Joey Burzynski	Jack Miller	Joey Burzynski	Erik Gunderson
⋅	⋅	⋅	⋅	⋅

TE
Brandon Moore
Mike Kwiatkowski
A.J. Williams

WR
Jeremy Gallon
Drew Dileo
Jeremy Jackson

QB
Denard Robinson
Devin Gardner
Russell Bellomy

RB
Fitzgerald Toussaint
Thomas Rawls
Vincent Smith

FB
Stephen Hopkins
Joe Kerridge
⋅

Special teams
PK Brendan Gibbons
PK Matt Wile
P Will Hagerup
KR Dennis Norfleet/Josh Furman
PR Jeremy Gallon
LS Jareth Glanda
H Drew Dileo

== 2013 NFL draft ==
The 2013 NFL Draft ran from on April 25 to April 27. Michigan players eligible to be drafted were Denard Robinson, Jordan Kovacs, Roy Roundtree, Kenny Demens, Ricky Barnum, Elliott Mealer, Vincent Smith, Patrick Omameh, Mike Kwiatkowski, Brandon Moore, Brandin Hawthorne, J.T. Floyd, Will Campbell, Craig Roh, Steve Wilson, Jack Kennedy, Paul Gyarmati, Matthew Cavanaugh, and Floyd Simmons. Taylor Lewan decided to return for his senior season, despite being considered a potential first round pick in the draft. Denard Robinson was invited to the 2013 Senior Bowl as a wide receiver.

Robinson and Campbell were selected in the fifth and sixth rounds of the draft. Undrafted free agent signees were Kovacs (Dolphins), Roh (Panthers), Roundtree (Bengals), Mealer (Saints), Omameh (49ers), Demens (Texans) and Barnum (Redskins).

Rnd.	Pick	Team	Player	Pos.	College	Notes
5	135	Jacksonville Jaguars	Denard Robinson	WR	Michigan	
6	178	New York Jets	William Campbell	G	Michigan	

== Roster ==
2012 Michigan Wolverines football team roster
Players
Coaches
Offense

Pos.	#	Name	Class
RB	2	Vincent Smith	Sr
WR	3	Bo Dever	Fr
QB	4	Steve Wilson	Sr
RB	5	Justice Hayes	RFr
QB	6	Brian Cleary	Fr
QB	8	Russell Bellomy	RFr
WR	9	Drew Dileo	Jr
WR	10	Jeremy Gallon	Jr
QB	12	Devin Gardner	Jr
QB	13	Alex Swieca	RFr
QB	14	Jack Kennedy	Sr
QB	16	Denard Robinson (C)	Sr
WR	17	Jeremy Jackson	Jr
WR	18	Devon Micou	RFr
TE	19	Devin Funchess	Fr
WR	21	Roy Roundtree	Sr
RB	26	Dennis Norfleet	Fr
WR	27	Jonathan Keizer	RFr
RB	28	Fitzgerald Toussaint	Jr
RB	29	Drake Johnson	Fr
FB	31	Paul Gyarmati	Sr
RB	33	Stephen Hopkins	Jr
FB	36	Joe Kerridge	RFr
RB	38	Thomas Rawls	So
FB	39	Sione Houma	Fr
TE	40	Nate Allspach	So
TE	42	Dylan Esterline	So
OL	52	Ricky Barnum	Sr
OL	56	Joey Burzynski	So
OL	57	Elliott Mealer	Sr
OL	58	Chris Bryant (injured)	RFr
OL	60	Jack Miller	RFr
OL	61	Graham Glasgow	RFr
OL	62	Blake Bars	Fr
OL	63	Ben Pliska	Fr
OL	65	Patrick Omameh	Sr
OL	67	Kyle Kalis	Fr
OL	69	Erik Gunderson	Jr
OL	70	Kristian Mateus	So
OL	71	Ben Braden	Fr
OL	75	Michael Schofield	Jr
OL	77	Taylor Lewan	Jr
OL	78	Erik Magnuson	Fr
OL	79	Dan Gibbs	Fr
TE	80	Ricardo Miller	So
TE	81	Mike Kwiatkowski	Sr
WR	82	Amara Darboh	Fr
WR	83	Jerald Robinson	So
TE	84	A.J. Williams	Fr
WR	85	Joe Reynolds	Jr
WR	86	Jehu Chesson	Fr
TE	87	Brandon Moore	Sr
TE	91	David Mitropoulos-Rundus	RFr
TE	93	Chris Eddins	So
TE	94	Jordan Paskorz	So

Defense

Pos.	#	Name	Class
S	3	Marvin Robinson	Jr
LB	4	Cameron Gordon	Jr
CB	5	Courtney Avery	Jr
DB	6	Raymon Taylor	So
S	7	Brandin Hawthorne	Sr
CB	8	J. T. Floyd	Sr
S	11	Jordan Kovacs (C)	Sr
DB	12	Allen Gant	Fr
CB	13	Terry Richardson	Fr
S	14	Josh Furman	So
LB	15	James Ross	Fr
DB	18	Blake Countess (injured)	So
S	19	Charlie Zeller	Jr
S	22	Jarrod Wilson	Fr
S	23	Floyd Simmons	Sr
DB	24	Delonte Hollowell	So
LB	25	Kenny Demens	Sr
LB	27	Mike Jones	Jr
S	28	Matthew Cavanaugh	Sr
S	30	Thomas Gordon	Jr
S	31	Andrew Offerdahl	Fr
S	34	Jeremy Clark	Fr
LB	35	Joe Bolden	Fr
CB	38	Al Backey	Jr
LB	40	Antonio Poole (injured)	RFr
DT	41	Kenny Wilkins	So
DE	43	Chris Wormley (injured)	Fr
S	46	Chris Maye	Fr
LB	47	Jake Ryan	So
LB	48	Desmond Morgan	So
LB	49	Kaleb Ringer (injured)	Fr
DE	50	Tom Strobel	Fr
LB	52	Royce Jenkins-Stone	Fr
DE	53	Mario Ojemudia	Fr
DT	54	Richard Ash	So
DE	55	Jibreel Black	Jr
DT	56	Ondre Pipkins	Fr
DE	57	Frank Clark	So
LB	59	Mark Lawson	Fr
DT	67	Nathan Brink	Jr
DT	69	Willie Henry	Fr
DT	73	William Campbell	Sr
DT	76	Quinton Washington	Jr
DE	88	Craig Roh	Sr
DE	92	Keith Heitzman	RFr
DL	96	Ryan Glasgow	Fr
LB	97	Brennen Beyer	So
DT	99	Matt Godin	Fr

Special teams

Pos.	#	Name	Class
PK	34	Brendan Gibbons	Jr
P	43	Will Hagerup	Jr
PK	45	Matt Wile	So
PK	46	Seth Broekhuizen	Jr
LS	54	Jareth Glanda	Jr
P	91	Kenneth Allen	Fr
LS	94	Curt Graman	So
PK	95	Anthony Capatina	Jr

Head coach

- Brady Hoke

Coordinators/assistant coaches

- Al Borges (Offensive coordinator / quarterbacks)
- Greg Mattison (Defensive coordinator)
- Dan Ferrigno (Tight ends / special teams)
- Darrell Funk (Offensive line)
- Jeff Hecklinski (Wide receivers)
- Fred Jackson (Running backs)
- Curt Mallory (Defensive backs)
- Jerry Montgomery (Defensive line)
- Mark Smith (Linebackers)
- Ernie Lawson (Defensive graduate assistant)
- Aubrey Pleasant (Defensive graduate assistant)
- Adam Stenavich (Offensive graduate assistant)

Legend

- (C) Team captain
- (S) Suspended
- (I) Ineligible
- Injured
- Redshirt

Roster
Last update: November 10, 2012
