= Matt Wile =

American football player (born 1992)

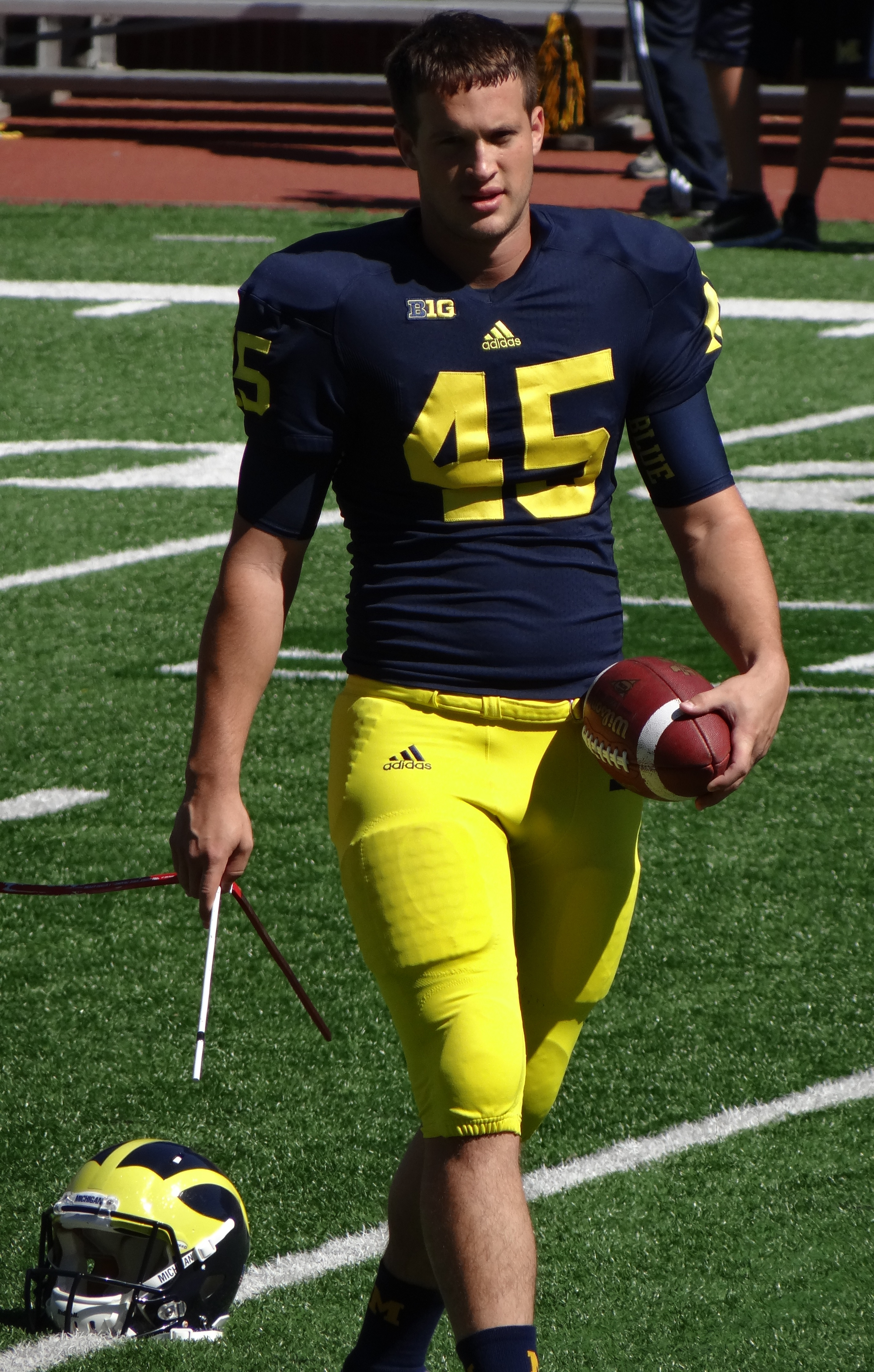
- Wile with the Michigan Wolverines in 2012

No. 6, 4
- Position: Punter

Personal information
- Born: June 20, 1992 (age 34); San Diego, California, U.S.
- Listed height: 6 ft 2 in (1.88 m)
- Listed weight: 223 lb (101 kg)

Career information
- High school: Francis Parker School (San Diego)
- College: Michigan (2011–2014)
- NFL draft: 2015: undrafted

Career history
- Carolina Panthers (2015)*; Dallas Cowboys (2016)*; Atlanta Falcons (2016); Arizona Cardinals (2016); Pittsburgh Steelers (2018)*; Minnesota Vikings (2018); Atlanta Falcons (2019); Detroit Lions (2019)*; Tampa Bay Buccaneers (2020)*
- * Offseason or practice squad member only

Awards and highlights
- Super Bowl champion (LV); U.S. Army All-American Bowl, 2011; 2011 ESPN.com and BTN.com Big Ten All-Freshman

Career NFL statistics
- Punts: 90
- Punting yards: 4,098
- Average punt: 45.5
- Longest punt: 70
- Inside 20: 32
- Stats at Pro Football Reference

Matthew Blake Dickinson Wile (born June 20, 1992) is an American former professional football player who was a punter in the National Football League (NFL). He played college football for the Michigan Wolverines from 2011 to 2014. In four years at Michigan, he had 91 punts for 3,658 yards, an average of 40.2 yards per punt. He converted 20 of 29 field goal attempts and was successful on 33 of 33 extra point attempts.

== Early life ==
Wile began kicking at the age of 8. He attended the Francis Parker School in San Diego, California, where he played high school football as a punter, placekicker, linebacker, and defensive end. As a senior in 2010, he made 10 of his 13 field goal attempts, and 91 of his 101 kickoffs resulted in touchbacks. After his senior year, Wile played as a punter in the U.S. Army All-American Bowl.

== College career ==
=== Recruiting and commitment ===
After the team's placekickers converted only 4 of 14 field goal attempts in 2010, signing a placekicker was one of the top priorities for the Michigan Wolverines football team. When Brady Hoke was named the team's new head coach in January 2011, Wile became Hoke's top kicking target. Wile had multiple connections to Hoke and Michigan. His father, grandfather, great-grandfather, and great-great-grandfather all attended the University of Michigan Medical School. Additionally, Wile's father, Dr. Peter Wile, was the team doctor for the San Diego State Aztecs football team, the team Hoke coached during the 2010 season. After Wile announced his commitment to Michigan in late January 2011, his high school coach John Morrison joked about Wile's five generation legacy at Michigan: "Talk about a Michigan man. He's as close as possible." Wile had a career-long 63-yard field goal in high school and was Michigan's highest rated kicking prospect since Garrett Rivas in 2003. He majored in Industrial and Operations Engineering.

=== 2011 season ===
Recruited principally as a placekicker, Wile was slated to handle kickoffs for the 2011 Michigan Wolverines football team. However, the team's regular punter, Will Hagerup, was given a four-game suspension for violation of team rules before the season started. As a result, Wile was given dual responsibility for kickoffs and punting as a true freshman. On picking up the additional duty, Wile said, "I hadn't really been practicing punting. When I got here, they asked me to start practicing."

When Michigan faced San Diego State in September 2011, Wile's father (who had been San Diego State's team doctor since 1986) told reporters that "blood is thicker than water," and he would therefore be rooting for his son and the Wolverines in the game. Wile averaged 49 yards on four punts against San Diego State.

During the 2011 season, Wile has handled all 79 kickoffs for the Wolverines, totaling 5,054 yards and an average of 64.0 yards per kickoff. He also handled 17 punts for 707 yards with an average of 41.6 yards and a long punt of 58 yards. He also made four solo tackles in the 2011 season. For the season, he earned 2011 Big Ten Conference All-Freshman team recognition from both ESPN.com and BTN.com.

=== 2012 season ===
Following spring practice in April 2012, head coach Brady Hoke said Wile and Will Hagerup were "neck and neck" for the position as the starting punter. During the 2012 season, Wile was successful on two of three field goal attempts and handled 12 punts for an average of 35.9 yard with nine of his 12 punts pinning opponents inside their 20-yard line.

=== 2013 season ===
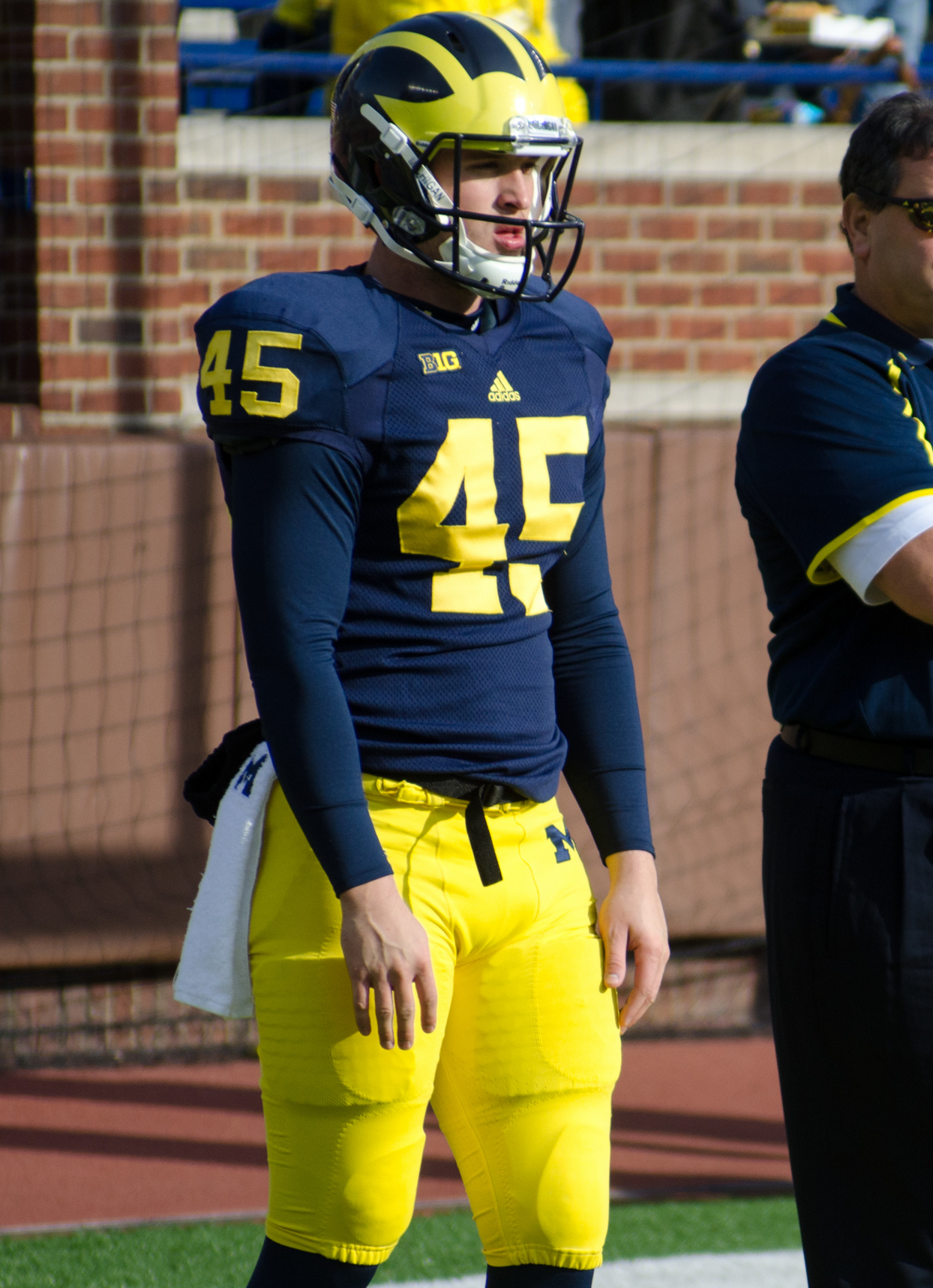
Wile in 2013

In 2013, Wile became Michigan's principal punter, handling 61 punts for an average of 40.6 yards, including 10 punts in excess of 50 yards and 16 punts pinning opponents inside the 20-yard line. He also converted three of five field goal attempts in the 2013 season.

=== 2014 season ===
As a senior in 2014, Wile handled only one punt but became the Wolverines' principal placekicker. He was 28 of 28 on extra point attempts and 15 of 21 on field goal attempts with two blocks.

== Professional career ==
=== Carolina Panthers ===
Wile signed as an undrafted free agent with the Carolina Panthers May 8, 2015. He was waived on June 10, 2015. He was re-signed on July 30, but was waived again on August 5. On August 17, 2015, he was re-signed by the Panthers. On August 30, 2015, Wile was released by the Panthers.

=== Dallas Cowboys ===
On March 31, 2016, Wile signed with the Dallas Cowboys. On September 3, 2016, he was released by the Cowboys.

=== Atlanta Falcons (first stint) ===
On November 22, 2016, Wile signed with the Atlanta Falcons. On November 29, 2016, he was released by the Falcons.

=== Arizona Cardinals ===
On December 6, 2016, Wile was signed to the practice squad of the Arizona Cardinals. He was promoted to the active roster on December 13, 2016. He was released on September 4, 2017.

=== Pittsburgh Steelers ===
On January 19, 2018, Wile signed a reserve/future contract with the Pittsburgh Steelers. Wile was released on September 1, 2018.

=== Minnesota Vikings ===
On September 2, 2018, Wile was claimed off waivers by the Minnesota Vikings. Wile was released on September 1, 2019.

=== Atlanta Falcons (second stint) ===
On September 17, 2019, Wile was signed to the Falcons practice squad. He was promoted to the active roster on September 21, 2019, following an injury to Matt Bosher. He was released on September 23 and re-signed to the practice squad. He was released on October 1. He was re-signed to the active roster on October 5 following another injury to Bosher. He was waived on October 15.

=== Detroit Lions ===
On November 6, 2019, Wile was signed to the Detroit Lions practice squad, but was released three days later. On November 16, he was re-signed to the practice squad. He was released on December 5. On December 30, 2019, Wile was signed to a reserve/future contract. He was released on April 27, 2020.

=== Tampa Bay Buccaneers ===
On December 31, 2020, Wile was signed to the Tampa Bay Buccaneers' practice squad. His practice squad contract with the team expired after the season on February 16, 2021.
