= Drew Dileo =

American football and baseball player (born 1992)

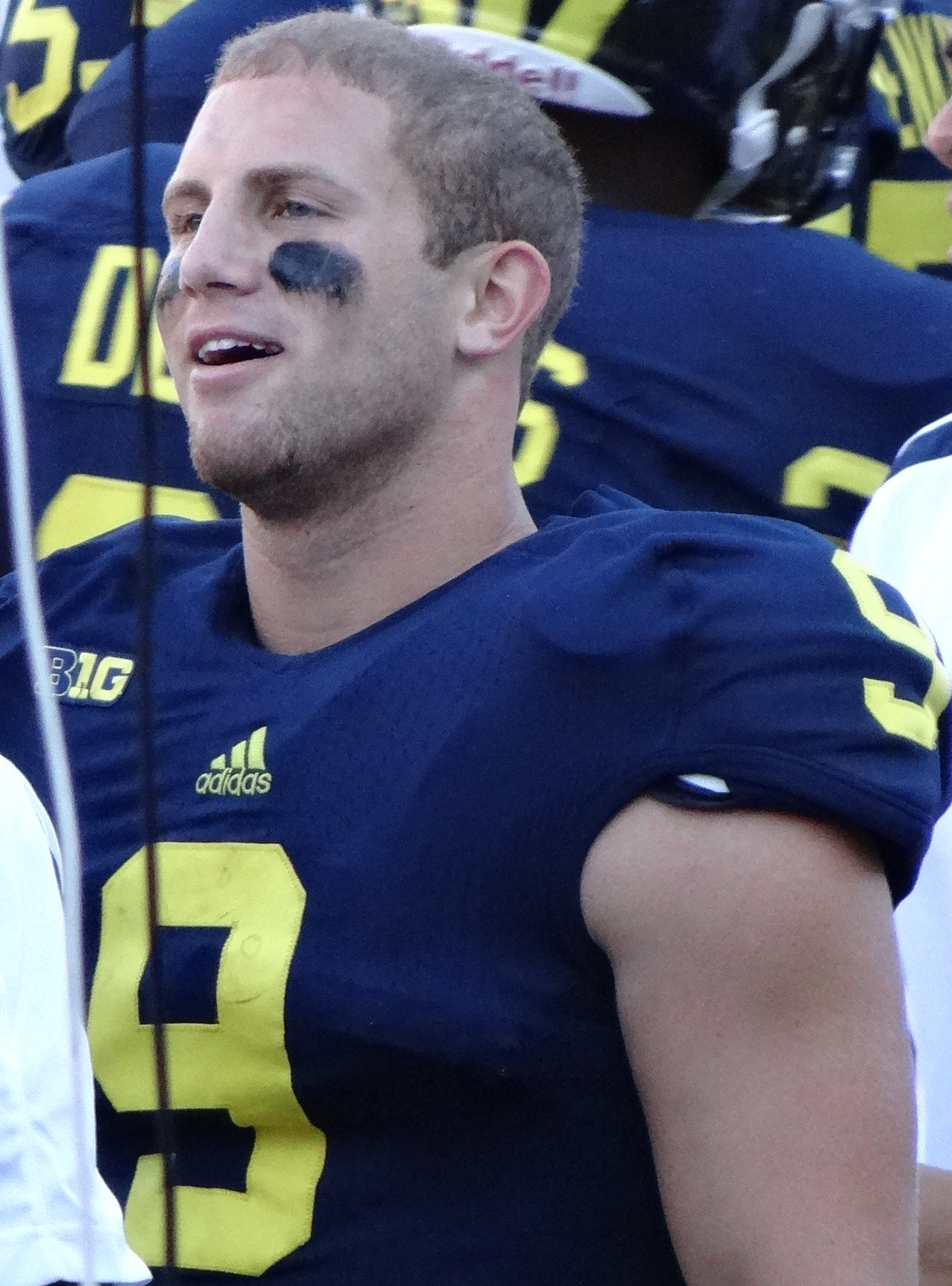
- Dileo at Michigan Stadium, October 2012

No. 9
- Position: Wide receiver

Personal information
- Born: April 27, 1992 (age 34); Greenwell Springs, Louisiana, U.S.
- Listed height: 5 ft 10 in (1.78 m)
- Listed weight: 180 lb (82 kg)

Career information
- High school: Baton Rouge (LA) Parkview Baptist
- College: University of Michigan (2010–2013)

Awards and highlights
- Sugar Bowl champion (2012)
- Stats at ESPN

Andrew Michael Dileo (born April 27, 1992) is an American college football wide receiver. He was a member of the Michigan Wolverines football team from 2010 through the 2013 season. He has completed his senior season as a wide receiver for the 2013 Michigan team.

== Early life ==
A native of Greenwell Springs, Louisiana, Dileo attended Parkview Baptist High School in Baton Rouge, where he became the only player in the school's history to accumulate 1,000 receiving yards and 5,000 all-purpose yards. He set the school's records with 73 catches for 1,193 yards and 14 touchdowns. He also played baseball as a second baseman and led the school's baseball team to consecutive state championships.

== University of Michigan ==
=== 2010 and 2011 seasons ===
Dileo committed to play for the University of Michigan in April 2009 and enrolled in 2010. As a true freshman, Dileo appeared in seven games for the 2010 Michigan Wolverines football team. As a sophomore, he appeared in all 13 games for the 2011 Michigan Wolverines football team, including Michigan's victory in the 2012 Sugar Bowl. He scored his first touchdown for Michigan on a 19-yd pass from Denard Robinson with 1:05 left in the 3rd quarter to give Michigan a 28-3 lead which led to a 31-3 win against Eastern Michigan on September 17, 2011. On October 1, 2011, he caught a 17-yd touchdown pass thrown by running back Vincent Smith with 14:52 left in the 2nd quarter to give Michigan a 21-0 lead in a 58-0 victory over Minnesota. In Michigan's Sugar Bowl victory over Virginia Tech, Dileo threw a pass on a faked field goal that was tipped and caught by Michigan's long snapper for a first down at the Hokies' eight yard line. Dileo was also the holder on the game-winning field goal as time expired in the Sugar Bowl which led to a 23-20 win over Virginia Tech.

=== 2012 season ===
As a junior for the 2012 Michigan Wolverines football team, Dileo appeared in all 13 games and caught 20 passes for 331 yards (16.5 yards per reception) and two touchdowns. Playing against UMass on September 15, 2012, Dileo recorded a career-high 91 receiving yards, including a 66-yard reception in a 63-13 win. In a 12-10 victory over Michigan State on October 20, 2012, Dileo improved on his career high with 94 receiving yards. Clutch receptions by Dileo set up three field goals for Michigan against Michigan State. Michigan trailed 10-9 when Dileo's 20-yard reception with 18 seconds remaining set up the game-winning field goal. Dileo also scored on a 45-yard touchdown pass from Devin Gardner in Michigan's 35-13 victory over Minnesota on November 3, 2012. In the broadcast of the Michigan-Minnesota game, the television announcers from the Big Ten Network "compared Dileo to Wes Welker, the New England Patriots' hustle man."

In addition to receiving duty, Dileo also returned punts and kickoffs for Michigan, and was the holder on extra points and placekicks. His versatility and work ethic have earned him the nickname, "Mr. Get It Done." Michigan's offensive coordinator Al Borges said of Dileo: "You need something done, send Drew. Whether it's holding for field goals, or needing an extra punt returner or running an option route, send Drew. He'll do it. Drew isn't going to make any errors. He's going to catch anything he can get to."

=== 2013 season ===
As a senior during the 2013 season, Dileo continued to serve multiple roles as a wide receiver, kickoff return specialist, and holder on extra points and kickoffs. He had a 36-yard reception against Central Michigan on August 31, 2013, and scored Michigan's final touchdown with 4:18 remaining in Michigan's 41-30 victory over Notre Dame on September 7, 2013. Dileo finished the season with 16 receptions for 174 yards and two touchdowns.
