= J. T. Floyd =

American football player (born 1989)

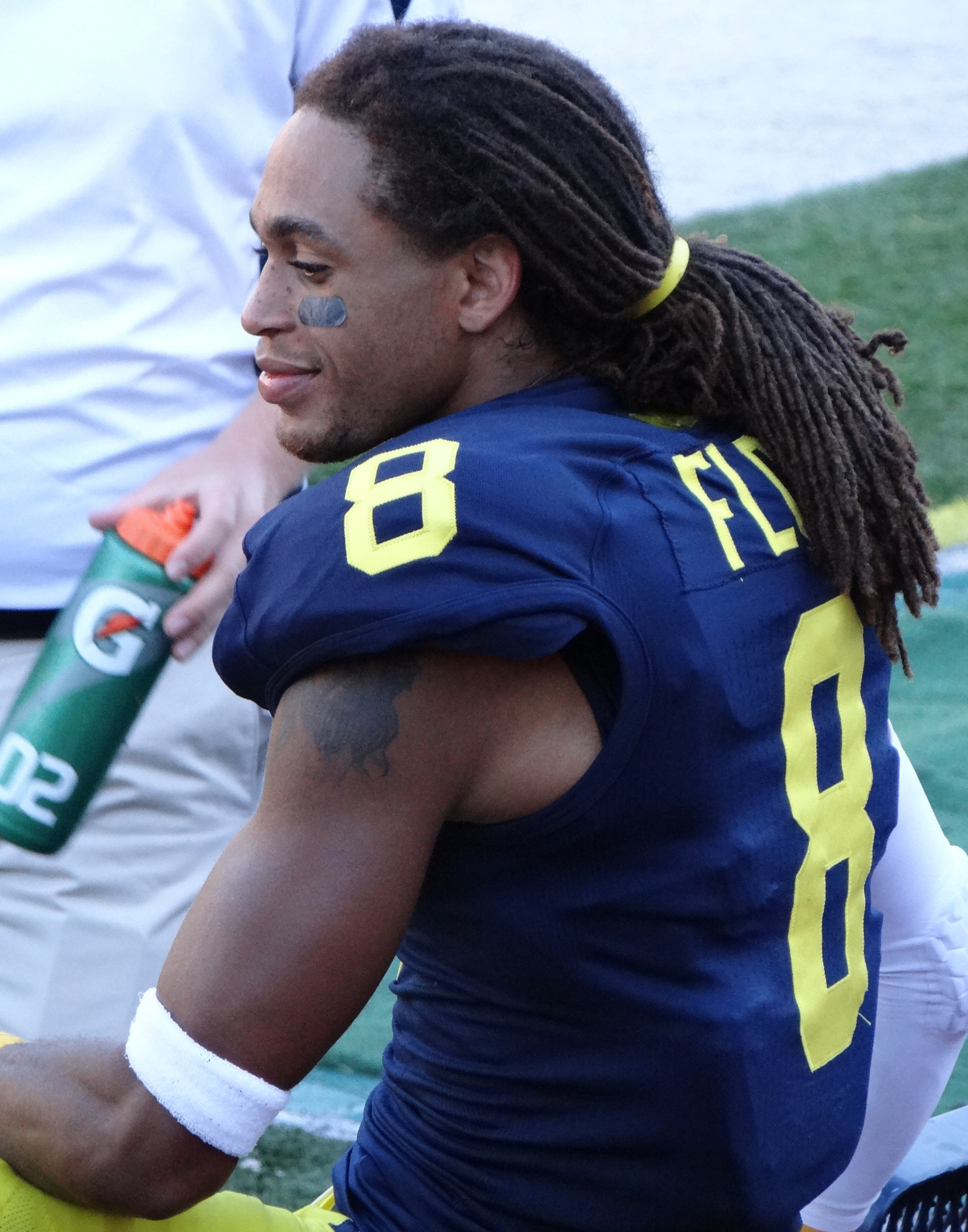
- Floyd on sidelines against UMass, 2012

No. 8
- Position: Cornerback

Personal information
- Born: December 8, 1989 (age 36)
- Listed height: 6 ft 0 in (1.83 m)
- Listed weight: 185 lb (84 kg)

Career information
- High school: J. L. Mann High School
- College: Michigan Wolverines football (2008–2012)

James Thomas "J. T." Floyd III (born December 8, 1989) is a cornerback who played his redshirt senior season for the Michigan Wolverines football team in 2012. He was an honorable mention All-Big Ten Conference selection for the 2011 and 2012 teams.

== High school ==
He was a first team All-State defensive back as a junior and first team All-state wide receiver as a senior.

College recruiting
Name	Hometown	School	Height	Weight	40^{‡}	Commit date
J. T. Floyd; CB	Greenville, South Carolina	Mann (SC)	5 ft 11.75 in (1.82 m)	179.5 lb (81.4 kg)	4.615	Jan 31, 2008
J. T. Floyd; CB	Recruit ratings: Scout: Rivals: (75)					
Overall recruit ranking: Scout: 75 (S) Rivals: 20 (SC) ESPN: 75 (ATH), 29 (SC)
Note: In many cases, Scout, Rivals, 247Sports, On3, and ESPN may conflict in their listings of height and weight.; In these cases, the average was taken. ESPN grades are on a 100-point scale.; Sources: "Michigan Football Commitments". Rivals.; "2008 Michigan Football Commits". Scout.; "ESPN". ESPN.; "Scout.com Team Recruiting Rankings". Scout.; "2008 Team Ranking". Rivals.com.

== College ==
Made his career debut against Western Michigan on September 5, 2009 as a redshirt freshman for the 2009 Wolverines. For the 2010 team his 66 tackles ranked sixth in the conference per game for the 2010 Big Ten Conference football season. Floyd notched a key forced fumble in the opening game against Connecticut on September 4. He made his first interception in the 28–24 September 11, 2010 rivalry game victory against Notre Dame. He posted 7 solo tackles and six assists on October 2, 2010 against Indiana and then posted 10 solo tackles and 3 assists the following week in the Paul Bunyan Trophy game against Michigan State on October 9. Floyd accumulated no statistics in the final five games of the season. He suffered ankle ligament damage on Tuesday November 2 during practice that required season-ending surgery.

Floyd did not recover from his injury in time for spring practice and found himself battling for a starting position prior to his fourth-year junior season. He switched from #12 to #8 (formerly worn by Jonas Mouton) prior to the 2011 season. He made his second interception the against Notre Dame on September 10, 2011 in the first night game at Michigan Stadium. He added another interception against Illinois on November 12. The interception came when Michigan was protecting a 17–7 lead in the fourth quarter. He was an honorable mention 2011 All-Big Ten Conference selection by both the coaches and the media for the 2011 Wolverines. Floyd finished among the conference leaders in passes defended/game (.77, t-5th). Floyd started 12 games in 2012, recording 48 tackles and 5 pass break ups. He was also a 2012 All-Big Ten honorable mention selection by both the coaches and the media for the 2012 Wolverines.

Coach Brady Hoke has suspended J.T. Floyd for undisclosed reasons, and he will not travel with the team to the January 1, 2013 Outback Bowl.
