= Dennis Norfleet =

American football player (born 1993)

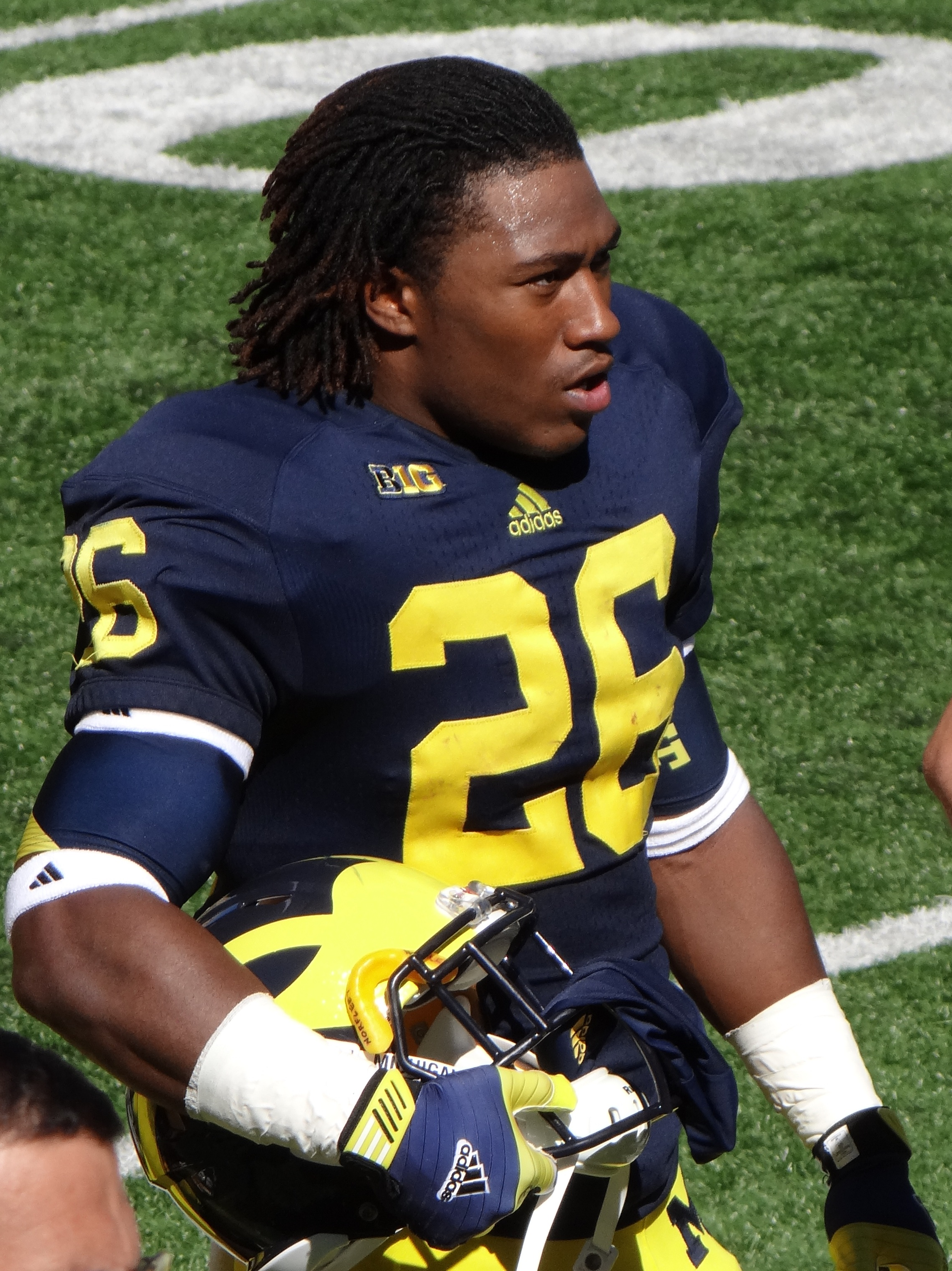
- Norfleet at Michigan Stadium, September 2012

No. 23, 26
- Positions: Wide receiver, running back

Personal information
- Born: February 8, 1993 (age 33)
- Listed height: 5 ft 7 in (1.70 m)
- Listed weight: 169 lb (77 kg)

Career information
- High school: Martin Luther King (Detroit, Michigan)
- College: Michigan (2012–2014); Tuskegee (2015)
- Stats at ESPN

Dennis Sheldon Norfleet (born February 8, 1993) is an American former football player.

== Early life ==
Norfleet played high school football at Detroit's Martin Luther King High School. As a senior in 2011, he rushed for 2,033 yards and 27 touchdowns. As a junior, he rushed for 254 yards against regional football power Brother Rice in the 2010 season opener. A versatile player, he played at running back, slot receiver, defensive back, kick returner, punter and placekicker in high school. Detroit King head coach Dale Harvel said of Norfleet, "What can I say? He does everything for us. He plays wherever we need him. Call him Jim Thorpe."

In August 2011, the Detroit Free Press named Norfleet as the most exciting player in Michigan high school football, calling him "lightning quick and more powerful than many think." Tom Markowski of The Detroit News added, "Pound for pound, if he's not the state's best football player, he's the most exciting."

Norfleet was a three-sport star at Detroit King, also playing as a guard on the basketball team and running as a sprinter on the track team. He captured the state title in the 100-meter dash event at the 2010 State Class 2-A Meet, recording a personal-best time of 10.60 seconds.

== University of Michigan ==
Norfleet initially committed in August 2011 to play for the University of Cincinnati Bearcats, but he switched his commitment on February 1, 2012, after receiving a late offer from Michigan.

Norfleet was kicked off the team prior to the 2015 season and transferred to Division II Tuskegee.

=== 2012 season ===
As a true freshman, Norfleet became Michigan's kickoff return specialist. In his first game for Michigan, Norfleet led the Wolverines with 177 all-purpose yards, including a 33-yard kickoff return, against Alabama. After the loss to Alabama, Michael Rothstein of ESPN.com wrote: "About the only positive for Michigan in the first half was the play of freshman kick returner Dennis Norfleet, who showed good instincts and speed."

On November 10, 2012, Norfleet passed Steve Breaston to move into second place in Michigan's record book in both number of kickoff returns in a season and kickoff return yards in a season. He trails only Darryl Stonum in Michigan's record book; Stonum returned 39 kickoffs for 1,001 yards for the 2009 team. Through the first 11 games of the 2012 season, Norfleet had returned 33 kickoffs for 768 yards, an average of 23.5 yards per return.

Norfleet also returned two punts for 53 yards, including a 42-yard return against Illinois, for an average of 26.5 yards per return. His 43-yard punt return against Illinois nearly resulted in a touchdown, but Norfleet ran into the punter and fell before scoring. He saw little action as a running back during his time as a freshman. In his first carry as a running back, Norfleet ran for 14 yards against UMass on September 15, 2012.

== Professional career ==
In the spring of 2016, Norfleet participated in Michigan's Pro Day.

Norfleet signed with the Saskatchewan Roughriders of the Canadian Football League (CFL) on April 26, 2017 and was released shortly thereafter on May 1, 2017.
