= Vincent Smith (American football) =

American football player (born 1990)

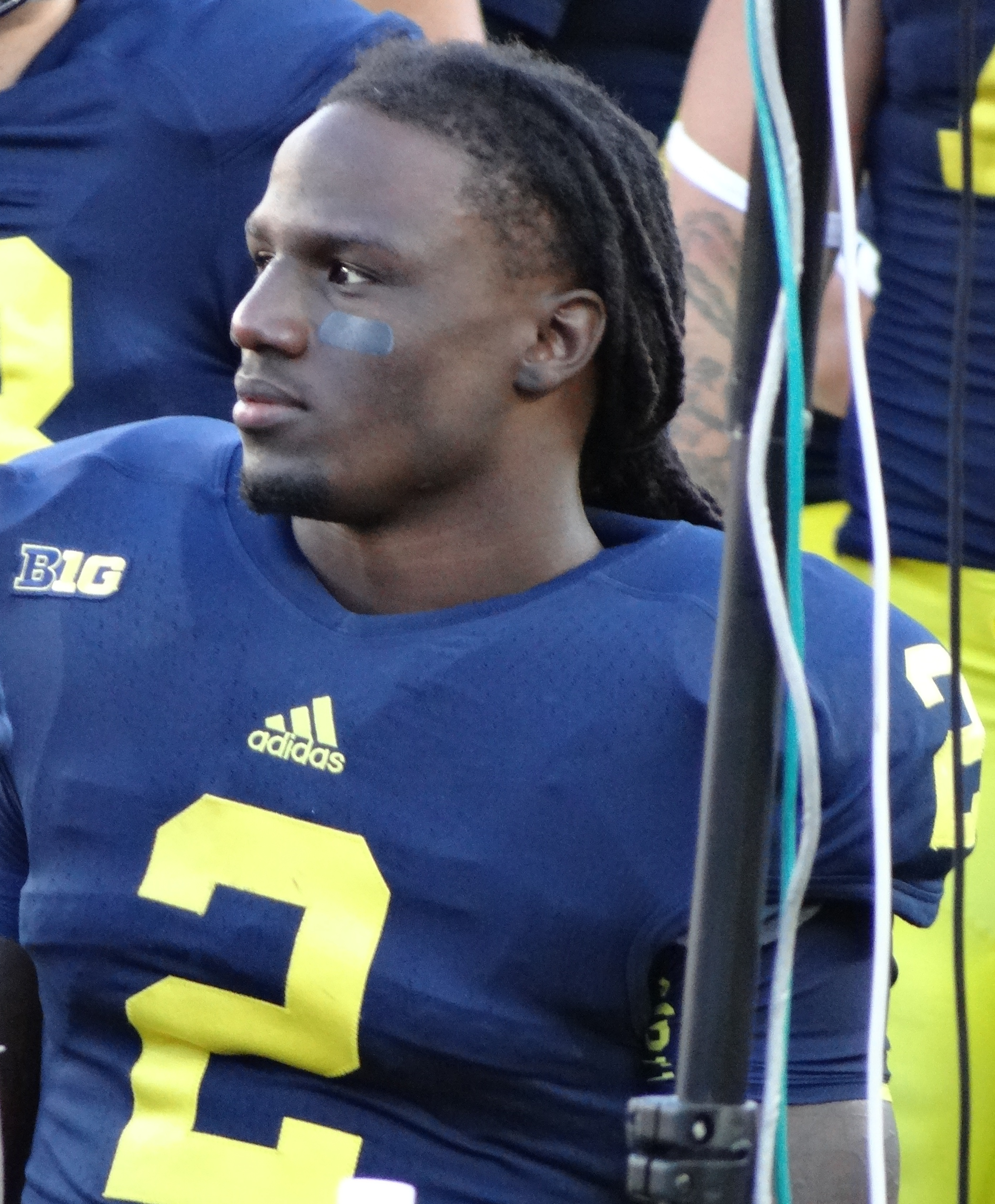
- Smith in September 2012

No. 2
- Positions: Running back, return specialist

Personal information
- Born: February 7, 1990 (age 36); Pahokee, Florida, U.S.
- Listed height: 5 ft 6 in (1.68 m)
- Listed weight: 176 lb (80 kg)

Career information
- High school: Pahokee (Pahokee, Florida)
- College: University of Michigan (2009–2012)
- Stats at ESPN

Vincent Smith (born February 7, 1990) is a former collegiate American football running back and return specialist. He played college football at the University of Michigan from 2009 to 2012. He led Michigan's running backs in rushing yardage during the 2010 season.

== Early life ==
Smith grew up in Pahokee, Florida and played high school football at Pahokee High School. He totaled 4,677 yards and 58 touchdowns at Pahokee, including more than 2,000 rushing yards and 29 touchdowns as a senior.

== College career ==
=== 2009 season ===
Smith accepted a football scholarship to attend the University of Michigan. As a freshman in 2009, Smith appeared in eight games for the Wolverines. He gained 166 yards on 17 carries against Delaware State on October 17, 2009. He had 276 rushing yards, 82 receiving yards and three touchdowns in 2009.

=== 2010 season ===
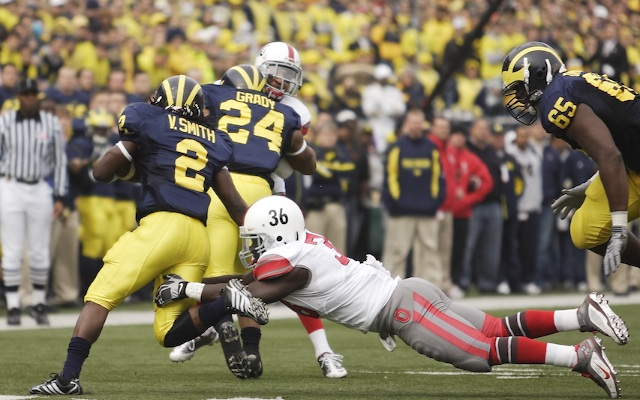
Smith against Ohio State, 2009

As a sophomore in 2010, Smith led the Michigan running backs with 601 rushing yards. (Quarterback Denard Robinson led the team with 1,702 rushing yards.) Smith also had 130 receiving yards and scored 7 touchdowns.

=== 2011 season ===
As a junior in 2011, Smith ran for 118 yards against Eastern Michigan on September 17, the second 100-yard rushing game of his collegiate career. After the Eastern Michigan game, head coach Brady Hoke named Smith as the Wolverines starting running back, adding that Smith had "earned that right." Against Minnesota on October 1, 2011, Smith became the first football player in Michigan history to score rushing, passing and receiving touchdowns in the same game. He was the first Division I FBS player to accomplish the feat since 2009. Smith's touchdown pass came on a 17-yard throw to sophomore receiver Drew Dileo. During the 2011 season, Smith had 296 rushing yards, 142 receiving yards, 17 passing yards, and five touchdowns (two rushing, two receiving touchdowns, and one passing).

=== 2012 season ===
Smith saw reduced playing time during the 2012 season. In the third game of the season, Smith scored two touchdowns on three carries against UMass, averaging 6.7 yards per carry. In his final game at Michigan Stadium, a 42-17 victory over Iowa, Smith scored a touchdown on an 18-yard catch and run. Through the first 11 games of the 2012 season, Smith gained 88 rushing yards and scored three touchdowns. Jadeveon Clowney's tackle of Smith in the 2013 Outback Bowl, which resulted in a fumble and sent Smith's helmet flying five yards downfield, became an Internet sensation as it was one of the most brutal hits of all time. Smith said of the hit: "I couldn't duck or try anything. My head wasn't even down and that's why my helmet popped off."

== Post-playing career ==
Following his playing career, Smith and Sonya Sutherland co-founded a non-profit company called Team Gardens, which aims to provide a source of healthy food for neighborhoods and build a sense of community. On December 17, 2020, Smith received the Dungy-Thompson Humanitarian Award for his project.
