= Will Hagerup =

American football player (born 1991)

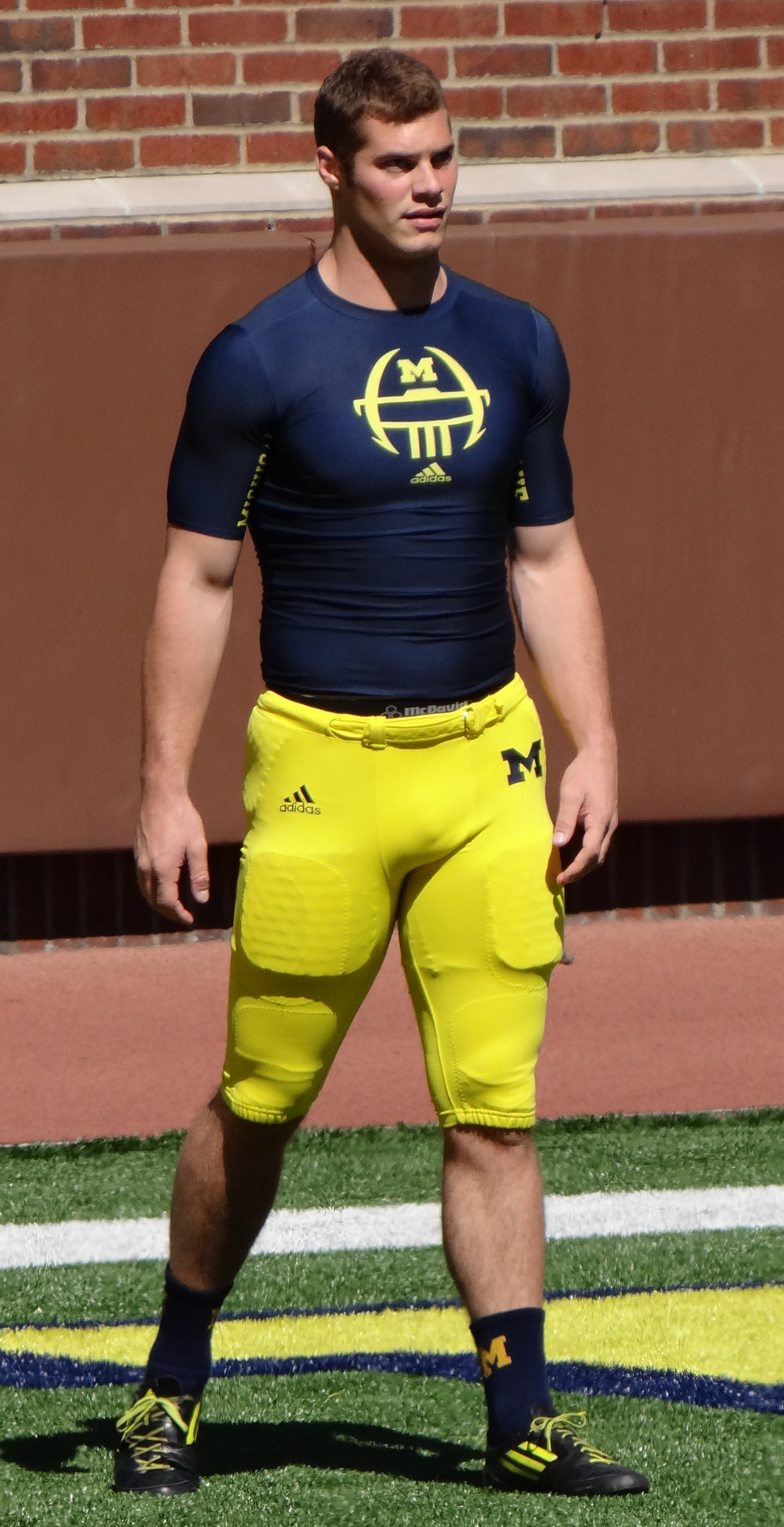

No. 43
- Positions: Placekicker, Punter

Personal information
- Born: December 1991 (age 34)
- Listed height: 6 ft 4 in (1.93 m)
- Listed weight: 227 lb (103 kg)

Career information
- High school: Whitefish Bay (WI)
- College: University of Michigan (2010–2014)

Awards and highlights
- Big Ten Punter of the Year (2012); First-team All-Big Ten (2012); Michigan single-season average punting yardage record: 45.03 yards (2012)

William Hagerup (born December 1991) is a former college football punter for the Michigan Wolverines. He holds the single-season average punting yards record and was the Big Ten Punter of the Year in 2012.

== High school ==
He started for the varsity football team at Whitefish Bay High School at punter, placekicker and tight end as a junior and senior. He was an All-American selection by Sporting News, PrepStar and SuperPrep and played in the U.S. Army All-American Game. Hagerup committed to Michigan on September 27, 2009. Once he committed, he was projected to be the most likely Wolverine to be a true freshman starter, because starting punter Zoltan Mesko was graduating. He signed his National Letter of Intent with Michigan on February 3, 2010. He attended Michigan's spring football practice on March 23. Upon graduating, he was considered to be the third best placekicker in the national high school class of 2010 by ESPN and Rivals.com and the fourth best punter by Scout.com. However, he was more highly decorated as a punter: he received first team All-state recognition as a punter.

College recruiting
Name	Hometown	School	Height	Weight	40^{‡}	Commit date
Will Hagerup; P/PK	Whitefish Bay, Wisconsin	Whitefish Bay (WI)	6 ft 4 in (1.93 m)	212.5 lb (96.4 kg)	4.8	Sep 27, 2009
Will Hagerup; P/PK	Recruit ratings: Scout: Rivals: (79)					
Overall recruit ranking: Scout: 4 (P) Rivals: 3 (PK), 10 (WI) ESPN: 3 (PK)
Note: In many cases, Scout, Rivals, 247Sports, On3, and ESPN may conflict in their listings of height and weight.; In these cases, the average was taken. ESPN grades are on a 100-point scale.; Sources: "Michigan Football Commitments". Rivals.; "2005 Michigan Football Commits". Scout.; "ESPN". ESPN.; "Scout.com Team Recruiting Rankings". Scout.; "2010 Team Ranking". Rivals.com.

== College ==
When Hagerup kicked a 72-yard punt for the 2010 Michigan team that stopped on the 3-yard-line against Purdue on November 13, 2010, it was the longest punt by a Wolverine since Monte Robbins' 82-yard punt on December 6, 1987, against Hawaii. Hagarup did not travel with the team due to a violation of team rules on for the Michigan–Ohio State football rivalry game on November 27 against Ohio State. In 2010, although true freshman Hagerup placed fourth in the conference in overall punting average (43.6 yards/punt), he led the conference in conference games punting average (46.0).

He was suspended for the first four games of the season with the 2011 Michigan Wolverines football team. In the October 15, 2011 Michigan–Michigan State football rivalry game against Michigan State, he had four of his seven punts downed inside the 20-yard line (10, 5, 5, 15).

He was the 2012 Big Ten Punter of the Year and the First Team All-Conference selection (media) for the 2012 Wolverines. That year, he led the conference in overall punting average (45.0). Hagerup did not attend the 2013 Outback Bowl due to a violation of team rules. Hagerup's 45.03 yards per punt average surpassed Mesko's school single-season record of 44.46 yards per punt.

On May 7, 2013, his suspension from the team was lifted although he was designated to sit out the 2013 season. He was a 2014 All-Big Ten honorable mention selection by the coaches.

== Personal ==
He is the brother of former Indiana Hoosiers punter, Chris Hagerup, who was a redshirt junior during Will's true freshman season. Chris, who was three classes ahead of Will at Whitefish Bay High School, earned a college football scholarship in high school, inspiring Will. Hagerup also performs as a rhythm guitarist.
