= Tate Forcier =

American football player (born 1990)

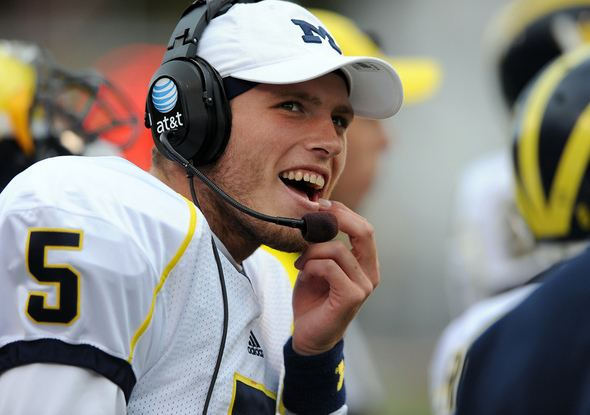

No. 5
- Position: Quarterback

Personal information
- Born: August 7, 1990 (age 36); San Diego, California, U.S.
- Listed height: 6 ft 0 in (1.83 m)
- Listed weight: 185 lb (84 kg)

Career information
- High school: Charter School of San Diego/Scripps Ranch High School, San Diego, California
- College: Michigan; San Jose State

Career history
- 2012: Hamilton Tiger-Cats*
- * Offseason or practice squad member only

Awards and highlights
- Sporting News All-Freshman Big Ten team (2009); Michigan single-game completion percentage (12-for-12) record

Robert “Tate” Forcier (/ˈfɔːrsieɪ/ FOR-see-ay; born August 7, 1990) is an American former football player. He was the starting quarterback for the 2009 Michigan Wolverines football team ahead of Denard Robinson, and Robinson's backup for the 2010 Michigan Wolverines football team. He left the program in January 2011 when head coach Rich Rodriguez was replaced by Brady Hoke. He was no longer enrolled at the university when the new term began following the semester break. On February 9, 2011, Forcier announced his transfer to the University of Miami. He originally intended to redshirt the 2011 season and play for the Miami Hurricanes football team in the 2012 and 2013 season but instead transferred to San Jose State University to play for the Spartans football team. He then attended training camp with the Hamilton Tiger-Cats of the Canadian Football League.

Forcier is from a family of quarterbacks with two older brothers who played Pacific-10 Conference football and a father who also played quarterback in college. His oldest brother, Jason, played briefly for Michigan before transferring to Stanford University. Following in the footsteps of his brothers and father, Forcier has been a quarterback since his Junior PeeWee Pop Warner Football days.

== Youth career ==
Forcier began working with athletic training guru Marv Marinovich as a third-grader. In 2001, Forcier quarterbacked the Carlsbad Charging Lancers to the four-team National Pop Warner Football Championship at the Disney's Wide World of Sports Complex in Orlando, Florida in the Junior PeeWee division. On December 5, Carlsbad defeated the Dorchester (Boston, Massachusetts) 15–12 in the national semifinals. Then Carlsbad lost to the Oak Grove Rage (San Jose, California) 34–6 on December 9.

Forcier is the youngest and smallest of three quarterback brothers. While he was in middle school, the family moved 60 miles (97 km) from San Diego to San Clemente, after football powerhouse Mater Dei High School, which is Matt Leinart's alma mater, recruited his oldest brother, Jason. Meanwhile, the family ran the San Diego Bus and Limousine Company, the family business in San Diego. With the parents commuting, Tate was often on his own as the little man of the house. The lack of academic attention left Tate with poor study skills and, by his sophomore year, he had to enroll at Charter School of San Diego.

=== High school ===
As a freshman, he and his brother Chris, who was then a junior, played high school football for St. Augustine High School. During his sophomore year Forcier began attending high school at the Charter School of San Diego, which did not have a football team, making him eligible to play for Scripps Ranch High School, where he completed 529-of-760 passes (69.6 pct.) for 7,448 yards and 61 touchdowns in his career. As a sophomore, he and Chris were opposing quarterbacks for a game. That season, Tate led his team to the San Diego Section Division II playoffs, and CalHiSports.com named him to the state All-sophomore team. As a junior, he led his team back to the San Diego Section Division II playoffs where they won their first game. CalHiSports.com named him to the state All-junior team. While he was in high school, he visited his brother Jason at Michigan about a half dozen times and got to know many of the players.

During May 2008, which was prior to his senior season, he was a nominee to play in the January 3, 2009 U.S. Army All-American Bowl at the Alamodome. That June, The Oklahoman described him as "a San Diego quarterback who holds [scholarship] offers from just about everyone". He made news by posting his Oregon Ducks football scholarship letter from Mike Bellotti as well as other letters on his www.qbforce.com website. The text of the Bellotti letter that was on his website said that the "offer is made in good faith," but that, "If this offer is not accepted by a date which is agreeable to us, the agreement may have to be altered with additional scholarships." He is considered the first high school football player to post his scholarship offer letters on the internet. Over 25 scanned letters were included. Later in June, he was among the highest scorers at the Elite 11 regional camp attended by the likes of Nick Montana (son of Joe Montana) and Jack Lomax (son of Neil Lomax). In August, he was listed on the ESPNU 150 Class of 2009 football prospect list as well as the SuperPrep preseason All-America team. He was regarded as one of the top five dual-threat quarterback recruits of the 2009 class. On August 30, 2008, he attended the game between the Michigan Wolverines and the Utah Utes, and he became the 17th verbal commitment on August 31. After a junior season with a 77% pass completion rate, Rivals.com ranked him as the most accurate passer in the nation, and as he entered his Division II semifinal playoff game, he was the nation's leader in passing yards. Although his team lost in the San Diego Section Division II semifinals, he finished the season as a third team all-state selection by Cal-Hi Sports.

College recruiting
Name	Hometown	School	Height	Weight	40^{‡}	Commit date
Tate Forcier; QB	San Diego, California	Charter School of San Diego and Scripps Ranch (CA) / University of Michigan	6 ft 0 in (1.83 m)	175 lb (79 kg)	4.58	Aug 31, 2008
Tate Forcier; QB	Recruit ratings: Scout: Rivals: (81)					
Overall recruit ranking: Scout: 15 (QB) Rivals: 164, 5 (dual threat QB), 18 (CA) ESPN: 144, 14 (QB)
Note: In many cases, Scout, Rivals, 247Sports, On3, and ESPN may conflict in their listings of height and weight.; In these cases, the average was taken. ESPN grades are on a 100-point scale.; Sources: "Michigan Football Commitments". Rivals.; "2009 Michigan Football Commits". Scout.; "ESPN". ESPN.; "Scout.com Team Recruiting Rankings". Scout.; "2009 Team Ranking". Rivals.com.

== College career ==
=== Michigan ===
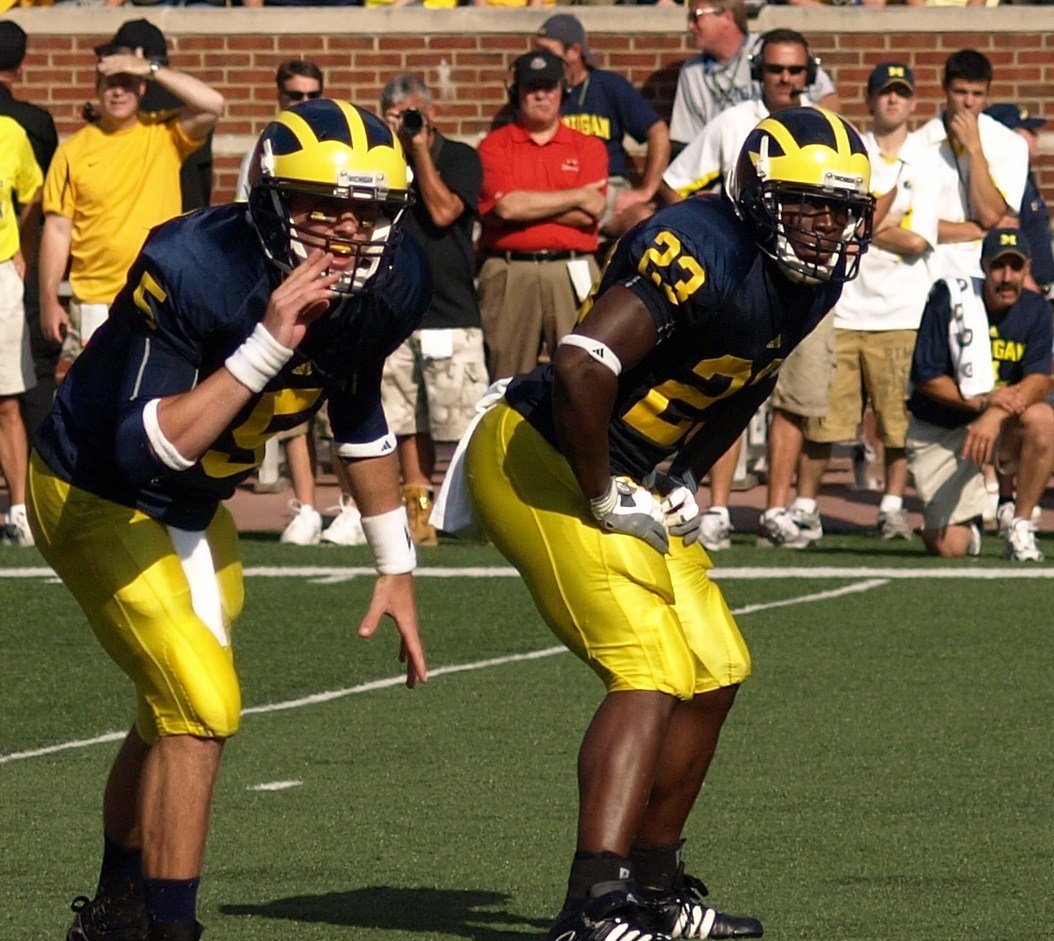
Forcier calling signals in the backfield with Carlos Brown during the 2009 Michigan – Notre Dame rivalry game

==== 2009 season ====
Forcier, at the encouragement of his brother, Jason, enrolled early during the winter 2009 semester at the University of Michigan. He was one of seven 2009 recruits to enroll early, according to the university directory, along with Vladimir Emilien, Brandin Hawthorne, Vincent Smith, Anthony LaLota and Michael Jones who began classes on January 7 and William Campbell, who was expected to join them soon thereafter. Forcier was awarded the starting job before Michigan's season opener against Western Michigan, becoming only the third true freshman to start a season opener at quarterback for Michigan. He eventually became the regular starting quarterback. After his first season, he was named part of the All-Freshman Big Ten team. Tate's freshman year started 4–0 before ending the season 5–7 overall. He finished 2009 with a 128.1 passer rating, ranking ninth out of 11 starting Big Ten Conference quarterbacks on the season.

==== 2010 season ====
Though Forcier started each game in the 2009 season, he was a member of the second-string offense during the annual Michigan Spring Game. Fellow sophomore quarterback Denard Robinson started in place of Forcier on the first-team offense. On September 4, 2010, he began the season third on the quarterback depth chart, behind Robinson and true freshman Devin Gardner.

On September 25, while playing against Bowling Green, Forcier set a Michigan record for pass completion percentage (with a minimum of 10 attempts) by throwing a perfect 12 for 12. In Michigan's 67–65 triple overtime victory over Illinois on November 6, Forcier led the team to a game-tying fourth-quarter touchdown drive and three overtime touchdown-scoring drives, including a pass for the game-winning two-point conversion. The game gave Michigan its sixth victory, clinching bowl game eligibility.

=== Transfer ===
In athletic director Dave Brandon's announcement of the University of Michigan's new head football coach, Brady Hoke, it was also reported that Forcier was no longer with the program. On January 20, 2011, Forcier announced in a press release issued over Twitter that he intended to transfer. He did not identify the school to which he intended to transfer. His initial list of schools included FBS schools Miami, Washington, Baylor, San Diego State, Middle Tennessee State and New Mexico as well as lower division schools such as Montana, South Carolina State and Florida A&M. On February 9, Forcier announced that he would be transferring to the University of Miami after narrowing his list to Kansas State, Washington, Arizona, Miami and Montana. In May 2011, sources reported that he would not be transferring to Miami. Although he had signed a financial aid agreement, he never matriculated at the university. By July, he was considering the Hawaii Warriors football team and planned a visit.

=== San Jose State ===
On July 26, 2011, Forcier announced that he had committed to play football at San Jose State University.

=== Statistics ===
			Passing							Rushing
Season	Team	GP	Rating	Comp	Att	Pct	Yds	TD	INT	Att	Yds	TD
2009 2010	Michigan Michigan	12 8	128.1 130.2	165 54	281 84	58.7 64.3	2050 597	13 4	10 4	118 22	240 51	3 1

== Professional career ==
On May 17, 2012, it was announced that Forcier had signed with the Hamilton Tiger-Cats. On June 15, 2012, he was released by the Tiger-Cats.

== Family ==
Forcier's oldest brother, Jason, redshirted in 2005, and was the backup quarterback behind Chad Henne in 2006 at Michigan before transferring in May 2007 to play for Stanford during the 2008 season. Jason, a graduate student at the time of his youngest brother's Michigan enrollment, was Tate's first year roommate. Tate's other brother, Chris, transferred from UCLA to Furman University in 2009 after Rick Neuheisel took over as head coach at UCLA and recruited Kevin Craft to be his starting quarterback. Chris had run the UCLA scout team as a redshirt, but lost the starting quarterback battle. The Forcier brothers' parents, Mike and Sue Forcier, are both lifelong Michigan Wolverines fans. They work at San Diego Limo Buses, which is a family-owned bus and limousine company. Mike was once a quarterback with modest achievements at San Diego City College and the University of San Diego.

== See also ==
- Michigan Wolverines football statistical leaders
