= Denard Robinson =

American football player (born 1990)

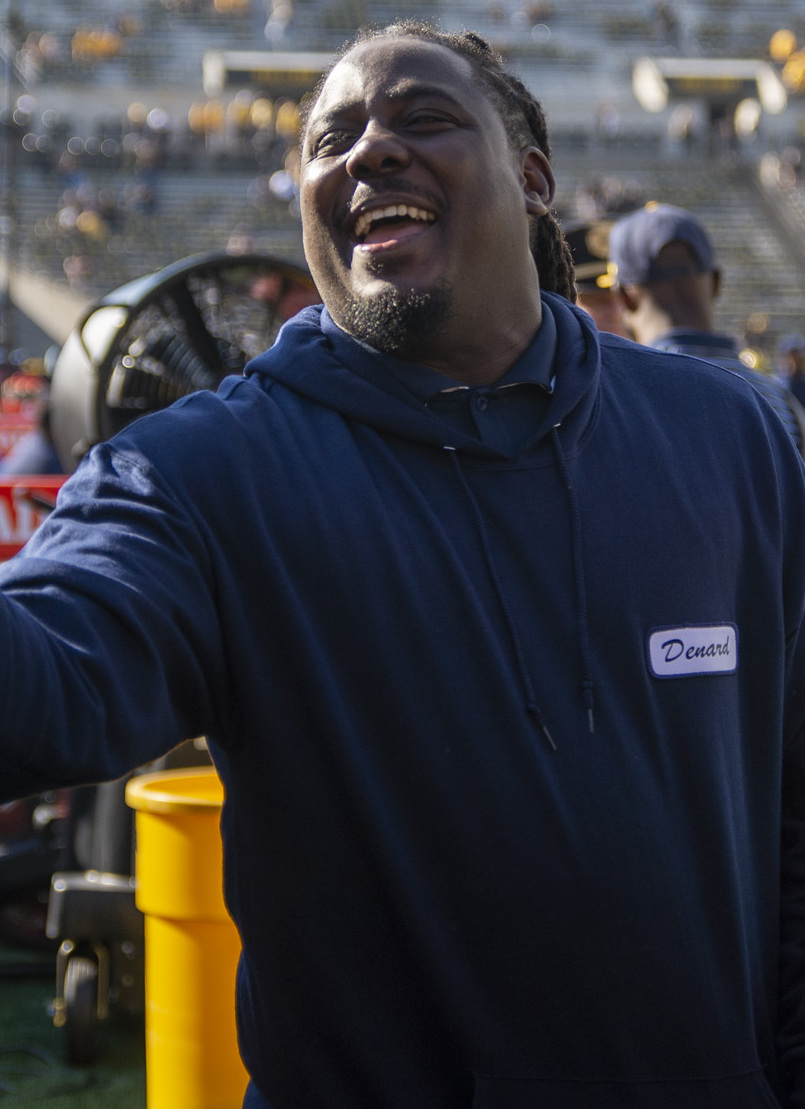
- Robinson with Michigan in 2022

No. 16
- Positions: Running back, quarterback

Personal information
- Born: September 22, 1990 (age 36); Deerfield Beach, Florida, U.S.
- Listed height: 5 ft 11 in (1.80 m)
- Listed weight: 213 lb (97 kg)

Career information
- High school: Deerfield Beach
- College: Michigan (2009–2012)
- NFL draft: 2013: 5th round, 135th overall pick

Career history

Playing
- Jacksonville Jaguars (2013–2016); Atlanta Legends (2019)

Coaching
- Jacksonville University (2019) Offensive analyst; Jacksonville Jaguars (2020) Offensive quality control coach

Operations
- Jacksonville Jaguars (2021) Scouting assistant; Michigan (2022–2023) Assistant director of player personnel

Awards and highlights
- CFP national champion (2023); First-team All-American (2010); Big Ten Most Valuable Player (2010); Big Ten Offensive Player of the Year (2010); First-team All-Big Ten (2010); Second-team All-Big Ten (2011)

Career NFL statistics
- Rushing yards: 1,058
- Rushing average: 4.0
- Receptions: 47
- Receiving yards: 310
- Return yards: 155
- Total touchdowns: 5
- Stats at Pro Football Reference

Denard Xavier Robinson (born September 22, 1990) is an American former professional football player. He played four seasons as a running back in the National Football League (NFL), and was a college football All-American for the Michigan Wolverines as a quarterback. Robinson was selected by the Jacksonville Jaguars in the 2013 NFL draft. After his playing career, he was also a staff member for the Jacksonville Jaguars, Jacksonville University and the University of Michigan.

As a sophomore in 2010, Robinson set the single-season NCAA Division I Football Bowl Subdivision (FBS) record for rushing yards by a quarterback and became the only player in NCAA history to both pass and rush for 1,500 yards. Robinson broke the Big Ten Conference season record with 4,272 yards of total offense (2,570 yards passing and 1,702 yards rushing), while leading the conference in rushing. In his second start at quarterback against Notre Dame, he set the Michigan single-game record with 502 yards of total offense. He was awarded the 2010 Big Ten Most Valuable Player and was selected by the Football Writers Association of America (FWAA) as a first-team All-American. He also set the Big Ten single-game record for rushing yards by a quarterback.

As a junior in 2011, Robinson led a resurgent Michigan team to an 11–2 record and a victory over Virginia Tech in the 2012 Sugar Bowl. He threw for a career-high 338 passing yards in a come-from-behind victory over Notre Dame in the first ever night game played at Michigan Stadium. At the end of the 2011 season, Robinson had eight of the top ten highest single-game offensive totals in Michigan history, as well as 948 yards in two combined games against Notre Dame. His total offense output in 2010 (4,272 yards) and 2011 (3,348 yards) rank as the top two single-season totals in Michigan history. As a senior in 2012, Robinson became the only player in FBS history to both pass for 200 yards and rush for 200 yards in a regular season game three times (including twice in 2011).

== Early life ==
Robinson was born on September 22, 1990, the son of Dorothea Robinson and Thomas Robinson Sr.

=== Nickname ===
Robinson began playing pee-wee football by age 10 and played the game with his shoes untied, thus earning the nickname "Shoelace" as a child. Those who saw him play at Westside Park in Deerfield Beach recall

Kids would go for his shoes on tackles, and he'd come up to the huddle in just socks. His coach couldn't stand it at first and neither could his parents. They'd tie wristbands around his shoes. When that didn't work, they tried athletic tape. They even rolled his socks over his shoes. He was a marvel, and he wasn't even finished with the sixth grade.

Robinson continued to play football without tying his shoelaces and became known as "Shoelace." One reporter who visited his family to watch a Michigan game noted, "To everyone in Deerfield Beach – everyone but his mother, that is – there is no Denard, just Shoelace." Robinson's high school coach, Art Taylor, explained his rationale for accepting the practice

After 25 years coaching, if the kid can throw it 90 yards in the air and is accurate and the kid can run as fast as he does ... as long as he feels comfortable, not lacing his shoes, fine with me. The kid's been doing it all his life, why mess with it?

At the college level, his coaches at the University of Michigan also accepted Robinson's practice. After learning that Robinson could run the 100 meters in 10.4 seconds with his shoes untied, Michigan quarterbacks coach Rod Smith called it "the damnedest thing I've ever seen" and added, "Anybody that runs that fast I'm not going to tell him how to tie his shoes." Robinson wore Adidas Reggie2 Superfly shoes with Velcro straps to secure them to his feet.

== High school career ==
As a ninth grader, Robinson tried out for a spot as a defensive back for the varsity football team at Deerfield Beach High School in Deerfield Beach, Florida. The team's defensive coordinator at the time was former Buffalo Bills defensive back Manny Martin, who was also Robinson's algebra teacher. Martin later recalled that he had an experienced defensive backfield, but Robinson "was always in my ear: 'I can do it.'" Robinson did not win a spot on the varsity team and instead played quarterback for the junior-varsity team as a ninth grader.

Robinson became the starting quarterback for the Deerfield Beach varsity team as a sophomore and filled that position for three years from 2006 to 2008. Deerfield Beach head coach Art Taylor recalled, "As soon as he stepped on that field his sophomore year playing varsity, we knew we had something special."

In a 2007 state semifinal game played at the Orange Bowl, Robinson led his team to within two points of upsetting Miami Northwestern, the top-ranked high school team in the country. While warming up, Robinson noticed that a Miami Northwestern lineman had taped a photograph of Robinson onto the front of his helmet. Robinson started laughing and told the player, "You think that scares us?" Robinson had Deerfield ahead in the game, 12–7, but Miami Northwestern completed a 99-yard touchdown drive with 18 seconds left to give them a 14–12 win.

In October 2008 against St. Thomas Aquinas High School, Robinson was responsible for six touchdowns in a single game, passing for 342 yards and five touchdowns and rushing for 54 yards and a touchdown. As a three-year starter for Deerfield Beach, Robinson totaled nearly 6,000 yards of total offense with 4,784 passing yards (262 for 576 passing) and 1,132 rushing yards (5.2 yards per carry).

In addition, Robinson competed in track for Deerfield Beach. In March 2009, he ran the 100 meters sprint in 10.44 seconds, and finished third in the 100-meter dash at the 2008 Florida 4A Track & Field State Championships. He also ran the 40-yard dash in 4.32 seconds. He was also a member of the 2008 Florida High School Athletic Association state champion 4 × 100 metres relay team.

=== College recruitment ===
As a high school senior, ESPN ranked Robinson seventh in the country as a general athlete and 101st regardless of position. Rivals.com ranked him 14th as a general athlete and 188th overall. Scout.com categorized him as a cornerback and ranked him 16th in the nation. Robinson received scholarship offers from Florida, Georgia, Kansas State, Michigan, and other programs. Michigan initially recruited Robinson as a defensive back, and Robinson declined. Robinson recalled that it was one of his goals to play quarterback at the college level. After observing his passing abilities, Michigan recruited Robinson as a quarterback. On February 4, 2009, Robinson announced that he had signed a National Letter of Intent to attend Michigan.

College recruiting
| Name | Hometown | School | Height | Weight | 40^{‡} | Commit date |
|---|---|---|---|---|---|---|
| Denard Robinson; QB | Deerfield Beach, Florida | Deerfield Beach (FL) | 6 ft 0 in (1.83 m) | 205 lb (93 kg) | 4.44 | Feb 4, 2009 |
| Denard Robinson; QB | Recruit ratings: Scout: Rivals: (81) | | | | | |
Overall recruit ranking: Scout: 16 (CB); 14 (school) Rivals: 188 (national), 14 (athletic), 35 (FL); 8 (school) ESPN: 101 (national), 7 (athletic)
Note: In many cases, Scout, Rivals, 247Sports, On3, and ESPN may conflict in their listings of height and weight.; In these cases, the average was taken. ESPN grades are on a 100-point scale.; Sources: "Michigan Football Commitments". Rivals.; "2009 Michigan Football Commits". Scout.; "ESPN". ESPN.; "Scout.com Team Recruiting Rankings". Scout.; "2009 Team Ranking". Rivals.com.

== College career ==
=== 2009 football season ===
Robinson enrolled in the University of Michigan's School of Kinesiology in the fall of 2009. During Michigan's 2009 summer training camp, Robinson was in competition for the starting quarterback position with fellow freshman Tate Forcier and junior Nick Sheridan. Forcier, who enrolled early and participated in spring practice, was named the starting quarterback, but Robinson saw significant playing time as a true freshman, appearing in all 12 games.

On September 5, 2009, in Michigan's season opener against Western Michigan, Robinson scored a touchdown on his first collegiate snap, which was fumbled. As the ESPN television broadcast focused on his untied shoelaces, Robinson took the snap in the shotgun formation, ran to the right, broke a tackle at the 40-yard line, then cut left and ran 43 yards for a touchdown.

Two weeks later against Eastern Michigan, he ran quarterback draw plays for touchdowns of 13 and 36 yards, though he also threw two interceptions.

In Michigan's October 10 game against Iowa, Robinson replaced Forcier in the fourth quarter with the team trailing 30–21. He led the team on a 59-yard scoring drive capped by his own 3-yard touchdown run with 3:16 left to cut the lead to 30–28. However, on the following drive, Robinson's threw an interception at Michigan's 31-yard line with 44 seconds remaining in the game.

Robinson led the Wolverines on four scoring drives against Delaware State, throwing his first two collegiate touchdown passes and scoring a rushing touchdown as well. His only start of the season came on November 14 as a running back against Wisconsin.

During the 2009 season, Robinson completed 14-of-31 passes for 188 yards and two passing touchdowns. He also ran for 351 yards and five touchdowns in 69 attempts.

=== 2010 track season ===
Robinson also competed for the Michigan men's track and field team during his freshman year. In January 2010, Robinson told a reporter, "When I was getting recruited I always wanted to run track and play football. It helped me move faster on the football field." Michigan track coach Fred LaPlante said Robinson had one of the 10 fastest 100-meter high-school times in the United States in 2009 and described Robinson the sprinter as "one of the four or five best guys in the Big Ten." LaPlante emphasized Robinson's "quickness"

One thing in football that you don't see in track is quickness. He's incredibly quick and his lateral movement is unbelievable and his ability to go in one direction and get in another. The perception people have is that's speed. That's not speed, that's quickness."

Robinson won the 60-meter dash in his college track debut in "The Dual" against Ohio State on January 16, 2010. His time of 6.81 stood up as the best by a Wolverine for the season. He finished fifth in the 60-meter dash at the Meyo Invitational on February 6, 2010. He finished ninth in the event at the 2010 Big Ten Indoor Championships in late February 2010, failing to qualify for the finals by four-thousandths of a second.

LaPlante recalled becoming panic-stricken during a practice race when Robinson was "running so fast he was having trouble holding the turn." Concerned about an injury to the football team's quarterback, LaPlante yelled out, "Denard! Please, don't do that again! I'll be fired in 2 seconds!" LaPlante recalled Robinson's reaction: "He had that great big smile on his face."

==== Personal bests ====
| Event | Time (seconds) | Venue | Date |
|---|---|---|---|
| 60 meters | 6.81 | Ann Arbor, Michigan | January 16, 2010 |
| 100 meters | 10.44 | Coral Springs, Florida | March 28, 2008 |

=== 2010 football season ===
2010 Michigan offense vs. Connecticut

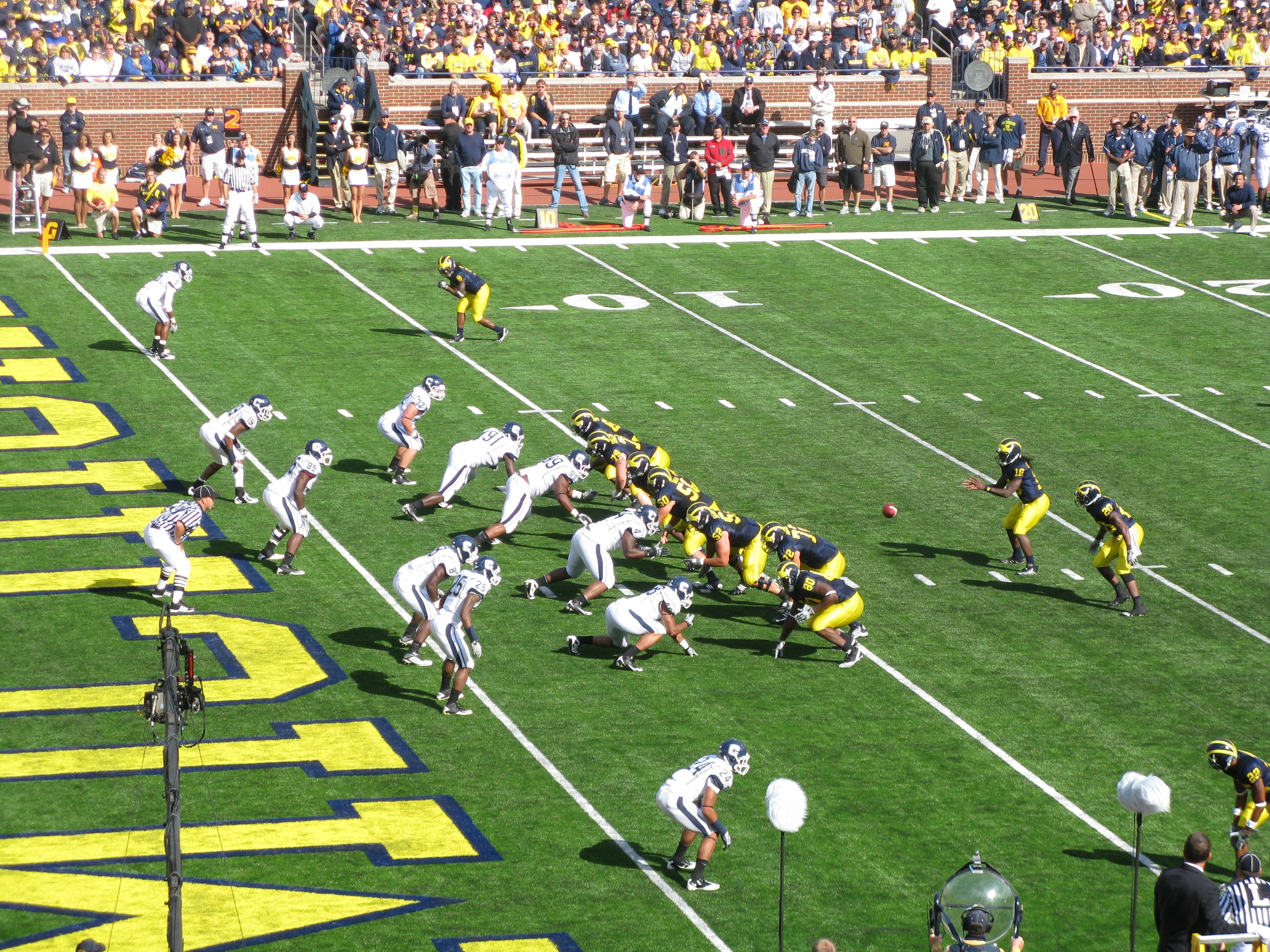
#16 Robinson takes the long snap for the 2010 Michigan Wolverines with #20 Michael Shaw, #22 Darryl Stonum, #9 Martavious Odoms, #52 Stephen Schilling, #50 David Molk as well as #79 Perry Dorrestein, #80 Martell Webb, and #72 Mark Huyge

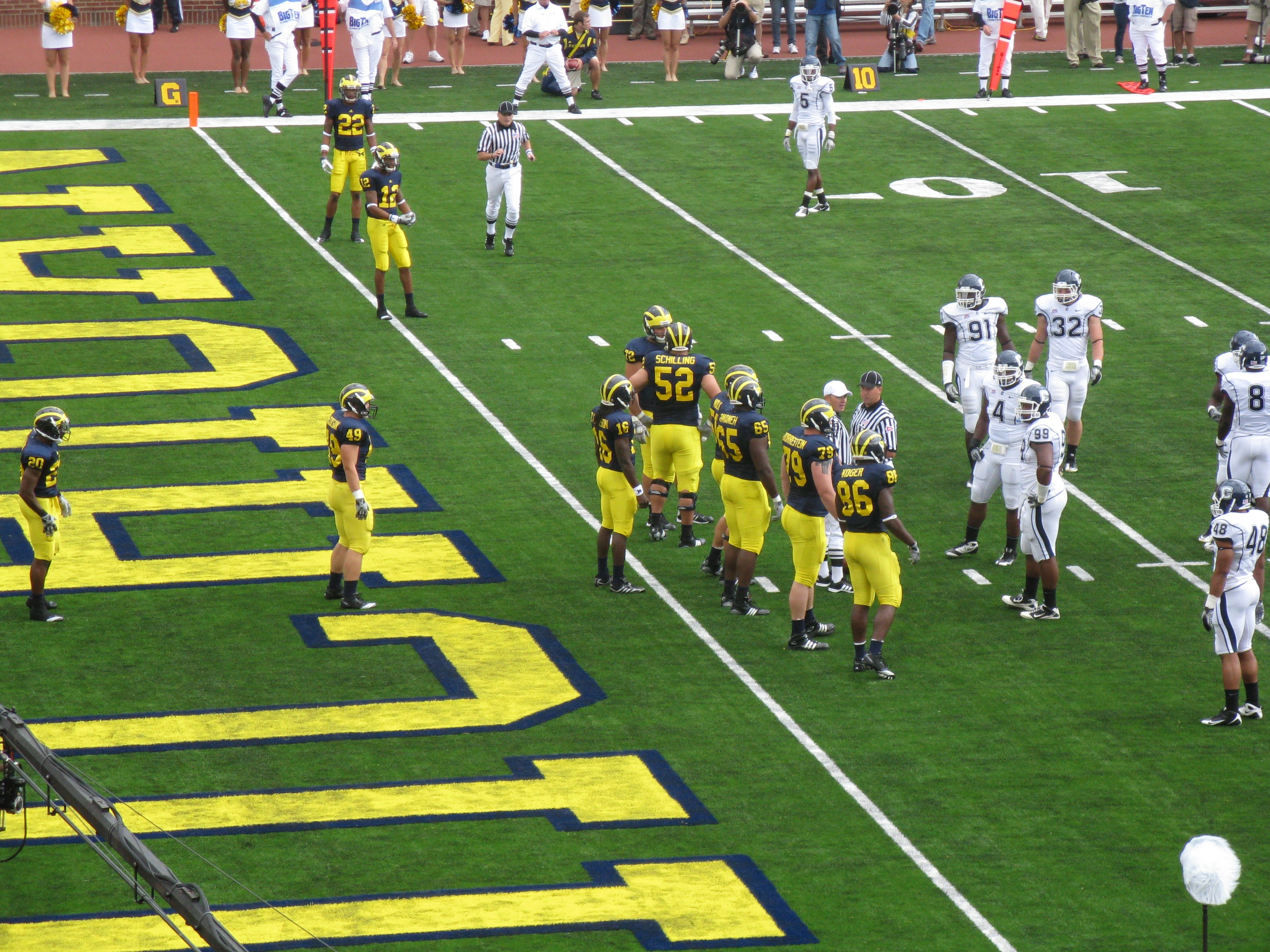
2010 Michigan Wolverines football team offense including #16 Robinson, #20 Michael Shaw, #22 Darryl Stonum, #12 Roy Roundtree, #86 Kevin Koger, #52 Stephen Schilling, and #50 David Molk as well as #79 Perry Dorrestein, #65 Patrick Omameh, and #72 Mark Huyge

==== Pre-season competition ====
During spring practice in April 2010, Robinson impressed coaches and observers, leading to speculation that Robinson would overtake Forcier as the starting quarterback. The competition continued through late August and early September 2010. In early September 2010, Angelique Chengelis profiled Robinson in The Detroit News: "The prevailing belief is that Robinson has worked hard enough and improved enough to earn the job. He took significant steps in spring practice, and from all accounts, he showed his teammates an incredible devotion to offseason conditioning and film viewing, all in the interest of honing his game and improving Michigan's chances."

Even on the morning of Michigan's season opener, the Chicago Sun-Times reported that "the mystery surrounding who would be the Wolverines' No. 1 quarterback was a major story line, with coach Rich Rodriguez keeping his decision secret until the very last minute."

==== A total offense record against UConn ====
Robinson did start Michigan's season opener against Connecticut. In the first half, he rushed for 131 yards and a touchdown on 15 carries for an average of 8.7 yards per carry. He finished the game with 383 yards of total offense, including 186 passing yards (19 of 22 passing) and 197 rushing yards on 29 carries (6.9 yards per carry). Robinson's rushing yardage against UConn was the most ever by a Michigan quarterback. He also broke Michigan's single-game record for total offense with 383 yards. For his efforts Robinson earned Big Ten Conference Offensive Player of the Week, AT&T ESPN All-America Player of the Week, and Walter Camp Football Foundation National Offensive Player of the Week recognition.

Less than a week after his performance in the Connecticut game, the New York Daily News wrote that Robinson had acquired "cult hero" status: "He has started only one game at quarterback for Michigan, but Denard Robinson is already a cult hero to the Wolverine faithful."

==== 502 yards of total offense against Notre Dame ====
In his second start at quarterback, Robinson led Michigan to a 28–24 win over Notre Dame against its traditional rival. He finished the game with 502 of Michigan's 532 yards of total offense (258 rushing yards and 244 passing yards), breaking the Michigan record he set in his first start. The record stood until Devin Gardner totaled 584 yards of total offense on October 19, 2013, against Indiana. In the first half, Robinson had an 87-yard touchdown run that at the time (surpassed on September 19, 2015, by C. J. Prosise) ranked as the longest run from scrimmage in Notre Dame Stadium's 80-year history, but remains as the longest run by a visitor in Notre Dame Stadium. He also scored the winning touchdown with 27 seconds remaining on a two-yard run, capping a 12-play, 72-yard drive. Robinson broke Mike Kafka's Big Ten Conference record for rushing yards by a quarterback and became the ninth quarterback in NCAA history (and the first since Pat White in 2006) to rush and pass for more than 200 yards in a single game. His rushing total also ranks as the all-time best in a road game by any Michigan player, regardless of position.

After the game, Brandon Graham, who played with Robinson at Michigan in 2009 and also played with Michael Vick on the Philadelphia Eagles told reporters that Robinson is even quicker than Vick: "Both of them are pretty fast, I just think Vick's older; he's not really that fast like how Shoelace is. I think Shoelace is more quick than Vick, but Vick, he gets away. He's pretty fast still. I think Shoelace might have got him by a couple steps."

Robinson's performance drew praise from the national media. The Wall Street Journal called Robinson "the breakout star of the young 2010 season" and drew attention to his "absurd rushing totals." Columnist Mitch Albom wrote: "Denard Robinson redefined the term 'offensive weapon' on Saturday against Notre Dame." ESPN college football analyst Kirk Herbstreit noted the "confident aura" around Robinson

The body language he exudes is, "I'm a winner." He's small in stature, but his heart you can almost see it pounding through his jersey. And then he has, like all the great ones, he plays with a swagger like, "You can't stop me."

Gregg Doyel, national columnist for CBSSports.com, proclaimed Robinson the front-runner for the Heisman Trophy: "Denard Robinson has earned the right to pole position in the Heisman race. It's not close. And if he stays healthy, I fully expect him to walk across a stage in New York City in December and take that trophy home."

For his performance against Notre Dame, Robinson was selected for the second consecutive week as the Walter Camp Football Foundation National Offensive Player of the Week, the AT&T ESPN All-America Player of the Week, the Big Ten Offensive Player of the Week, and the CBSSports.com Player of the Day. He is the first player to earn the Walter Camp honor two weeks in a row, and the fourth to do so twice in a season. He was also named the Capital One Cup Impact Performance of the Week. CBS Sports' Verne Lundquist joked: "He might become the first guy to win both the Davey O'Brien and the Doak Walker."

Robinson totaled 455 rushing yards and 885 yards of total offense in the first two games of the 2010 season, which led Division I FBS. Through the first two weeks of the season, Robinson had by himself outgained 87 of the 120 FBS teams in total offense.

==== Indiana: 494 yards of total offense ====
Playing against Indiana in the fifth game of the season, Robinson totaled 494 yards of total offense, the second-highest single-game total in Michigan history. He completed 10 of 16 passes for 277 yards and three touchdowns, and he gained 217 rushing yards on 19 carries for an average of 11.4 yards per carry. On Michigan's second play from scrimmage, Robinson ran 72 yards for a touchdown. On the second play of the second half, Robinson threw a 70-yard touchdown pass to Junior Hemingway, the longest of his career, to give Michigan a 28–21 lead. On Michigan's next drive, Robinson aggravated the knee injury sustained the prior week against Bowling Green and came out of the game for the remainder of the drive. He returned to the game and led Michigan on a game-winning, 65-yard touchdown drive in the final minute of the game. With 21 seconds remaining, Robinson completed a 32-yard pass to the 4-yard line. On the next play, Robinson scored on a 4-yard touchdown run with 17 seconds remaining.

With his performance against Indiana, Robinson became the first player in Division I FBS history to have two regular season games with 200 yards rushing and 200 yards passing. Seven others have accomplished the feat (including Pat White, Vince Young and Antwaan Randle El), but none have done so more than once in the regular season. Vince Young accomplished this feat once in the regular season and once in the Rose Bowl.

After the Indiana game, Dari Nowkhah wrote in ESPN's "Heisman Watch" column that Robinson was "running away with the Heisman Trophy" and compared him to 1988 Heisman Trophy winner Barry Sanders

We haven't seen this type of college football playmaker since ... Barry Sanders? I'm not saying Robinson reminds me of Sanders. (How could a quarterback remind me of a running back?) But there is a shocking resemblance between the diminutive playmakers in their speed, elusiveness and quickness. So is the effect the two have on my sense of what is right and wrong. Being that dominant on a football field somehow feels wrong. It's unfair.

On October 4, 2010, Robinson was named the Big Ten Offensive Player of the Week (for the third time in five weeks), and also received the Davey O'Brien Quarterback of the Week award (for the second time in four weeks). After five games, Robinson remained the nation's leading rusher in both total yards (905) and yards per game (181). He also ranked fourth in the country with a quarterback rating of 180.

==== Three consecutive mid-season losses ====
After leading Michigan to a 5–0 record and breaking the school's total offense records, Robinson was the front-runner for the Heisman Trophy. His Heisman prospects suffered after three consecutive losses to Michigan State, Iowa and Penn State.

In a 34–17 loss to Michigan State in the Paul Bunyan Trophy game, Robinson completed 17 of 29 passes for 215 passing yards but threw three interceptions. He was also limited to 86 rushing yards on 21 carries. Despite a "lackluster" performance against the Spartans, Sports Illustrated selected Robinson for its "September Heisman" following the Michigan State game. He was also selected by Mark Schlabach as the Offensive MVP in ESPN.com's Mid-Season Awards.

One week after the loss to Michigan State, the Wolverines lost to Iowa, 38–28. Robinson was limited to 96 passing yards and 105 rushing yards and threw his fifth interception of the season. In the third quarter, Robinson suffered a shoulder injury and did not return to the game.

Michigan's record dropped to 5–3 with a 41–31 loss to Penn State. Despite the loss, Robinson's offensive output rebounded against the Nittany Lions. He rushed for 191 yards on 27 carries (an average of 7.1 yards per carry) and passed for another 190 yards, including a 60-yard touchdown pass to Kevin Koger. With 191 rushing yards against Penn State, Robinson's season rushing total reached 1,287 yards, breaking Antwaan Randle El's Big Ten record of 1,270 rushing yards by a quarterback.

==== Offensive free-for-all against Illinois ====
In his ninth start, Robinson passed for a career-high 302 yards and ran for 62 yards against Illinois. On the first play from scrimmage, Robinson threw a 75-yard touchdown pass to Roy Roundtree. In the second quarter, Robinson also threw a 33-yard touchdown pass to Roundtree and another 75-yard pass to Roundtree to set up Michigan's third touchdown. Robinson set a school single-half record with 262 passing yards in the first half. Robinson came out of the game at the end of the third quarter after reporting concussion-like symptoms, including dizziness and headaches. Michigan went on to win the game 67–65. Robinson and substitute Tate Forcier combined to break Michigan's all-time, single-game record with 419 passing yards, surpassing the prior record of 396 yards by Tom Brady and Drew Henson against Michigan State in 1999. The following week, Robinson, was named as one of sixteen Maxwell Award semifinalists.

==== Consecutive losses to Wisconsin and Ohio State ====
Robinson's shot at the Heisman Trophy was lost with a disappointing performance against Purdue and consecutive blowout losses to Wisconsin and Ohio State.

In the Purdue game, Robinson turned the ball over four times (two interceptions and two lost fumbles) in heavy rain and gusting wind. Robinson was also held to a season-low 68 rushing yards against Purdue.

One week later, Michigan suffered a 48–28 loss to Wisconsin. Robinson passed for 239 yards and two touchdowns, rushed for 121 yards and two touchdowns, set the Division I FBS record for rushing yards by a quarterback and become the first NCAA player with 1,500 rushing yards and 2,000 passing yards in the same season. However, Robinson's individual performance was overshadowed by the 20-point loss to the Badgers.

In the final game of the regular season, Michigan lost by a 30-point margin (37–7) against Ohio State in The Game. Robinson failed to register a passing or rushing touchdown for the first time all season. Although he rushed for 105 yards on 18 carries, he was limited to 87 passing yards. After sustaining two dislocated fingers on his non-throwing hand, Robinson was replaced in the second half by Tate Forcier.

==== 2011 Gator Bowl ====
Michigan finished its 2010 season with a 52–14 loss to Mississippi State in the 2011 Gator Bowl, the worst defeat ever suffered by Michigan in a bowl game. Robinson completed 27 of 41 passes for 254 yards, two touchdowns and one interception. He added 59 rushing yards on 11 carries for 313 yards of total offense, enough to break Drew Brees' Big Ten single-season total offense record of 4,189 yards.

==== 2010 season statistics and awards ====
Robinson finished the 2010 season with 1,702 rushing yards (130.9 yards per game), which stood as an FBS single-season record for a quarterback until it was surpassed two years later by Jordan Lynch. He also passed for 2,570 yards and compiled 4,272 yards of total offense (328.6 yards per game). In the 10th game of the season against Purdue, Robinson passed John Navarre's Michigan single-season total offense record of 3,240 yards set in 2003. Against Wisconsin one week later, he broke the Division I FBS single-season quarterback rushing record of 1,494 yards previously held by Beau Morgan of Air Force. He also became the first person in NCAA (all divisions) history to record 1,500 yards rushing and passing in the same season.

At the end of the regular season, Robinson received the Chicago Tribune Silver Football trophy as the Most Valuable Player in the Big Ten Conference. He was also named Big Ten Offensive Player of the Year by the Big Ten coaches and media and by the College Football News. Robinson was also selected as a first-team All-American by the Football Writers Association of America as a running back, a third-team All-American by the Associated Press as an all-purpose player, and an honorable mention quarterback selection by Sports Illustrated and College Football News. He finished sixth in the 2010 Heisman Trophy voting, and was selected as a first-team All-Big Ten quarterback by both the Big Ten media and College Football News.

With 313 yards of total offense in the 2011 Gator Bowl, Robinson broke Drew Brees' Big Ten single-season total offense record of 4,189 yards. He fell 116 yards short of Tim Biakabutuka's Michigan school record of 1,818 rushing yards. However, he led the conference in both total offense and rushing yards per game.

=== 2011 football season ===
==== Decision to stay after coaching change ====
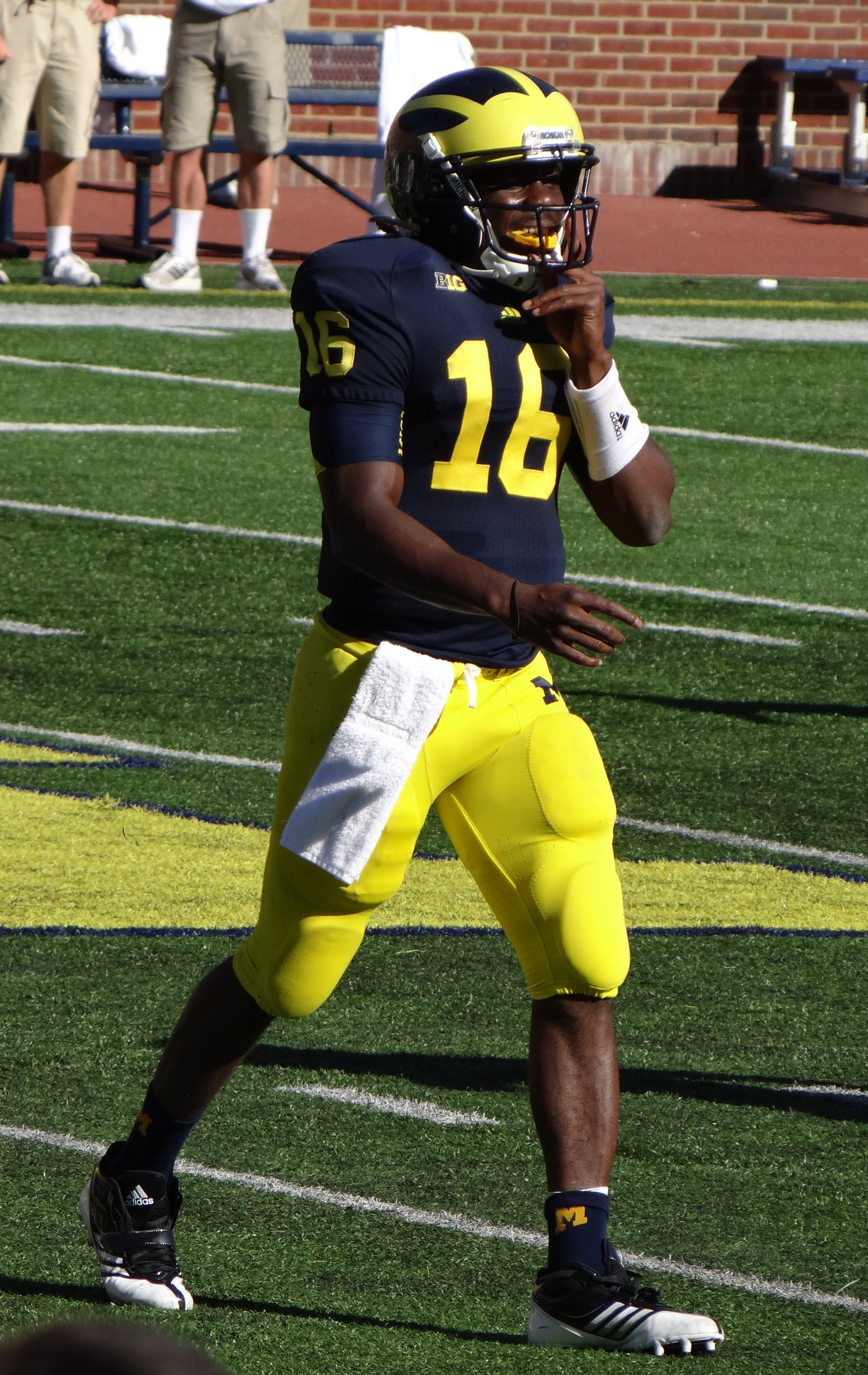
Robinson at Michigan Stadium

Following Michigan's season-ending loss in the 2011 Gator Bowl, head coach Rich Rodriguez was fired and replaced by Brady Hoke. As Robinson had thrived in Rodriguez's spread offense, the coaching change led to speculation that Robinson may transfer. On January 17, 2011, Robinson ended the speculation when he issued a statement confirming that he would stay at Michigan. In the video statement released by the University of Michigan, Robinson said he seriously considered transferring and noted that Rodriguez was one of the few coaches willing to give him the chance to play quarterback at the next level. Robinson explained his decision to stay at Michigan: "This is my family. This is my home now. ... I couldn't let it go." He also noted that he talked to his teammates and told them, "'You know, I can't just leave you out there.' I've been around these guys two years and we've bonded and it's like a family here. There's nothing like this."

==== Preseason focus on adaptability to new offense ====
Robinson entered the 2011 season on watchlists for the Maxwell Award, the Davey O'Brien Award, the Walter Camp Award, the Paul Hornung Award, and the Manning Award. In the weeks leading up to the 2011 season, the media focused on questions surrounding Robinson's ability to adapt to the pro-style offense being implemented by new offensive coordinator, Al Borges and also on Borges' willingness to adjust his game plan to take advantage of Robinson's running capability. Robinson noted that the running game would remain an option even in passing situations, adding, "If nobody's open, the broken play is probably the hardest play to stop in college football – in any football."

==== Regular season ====
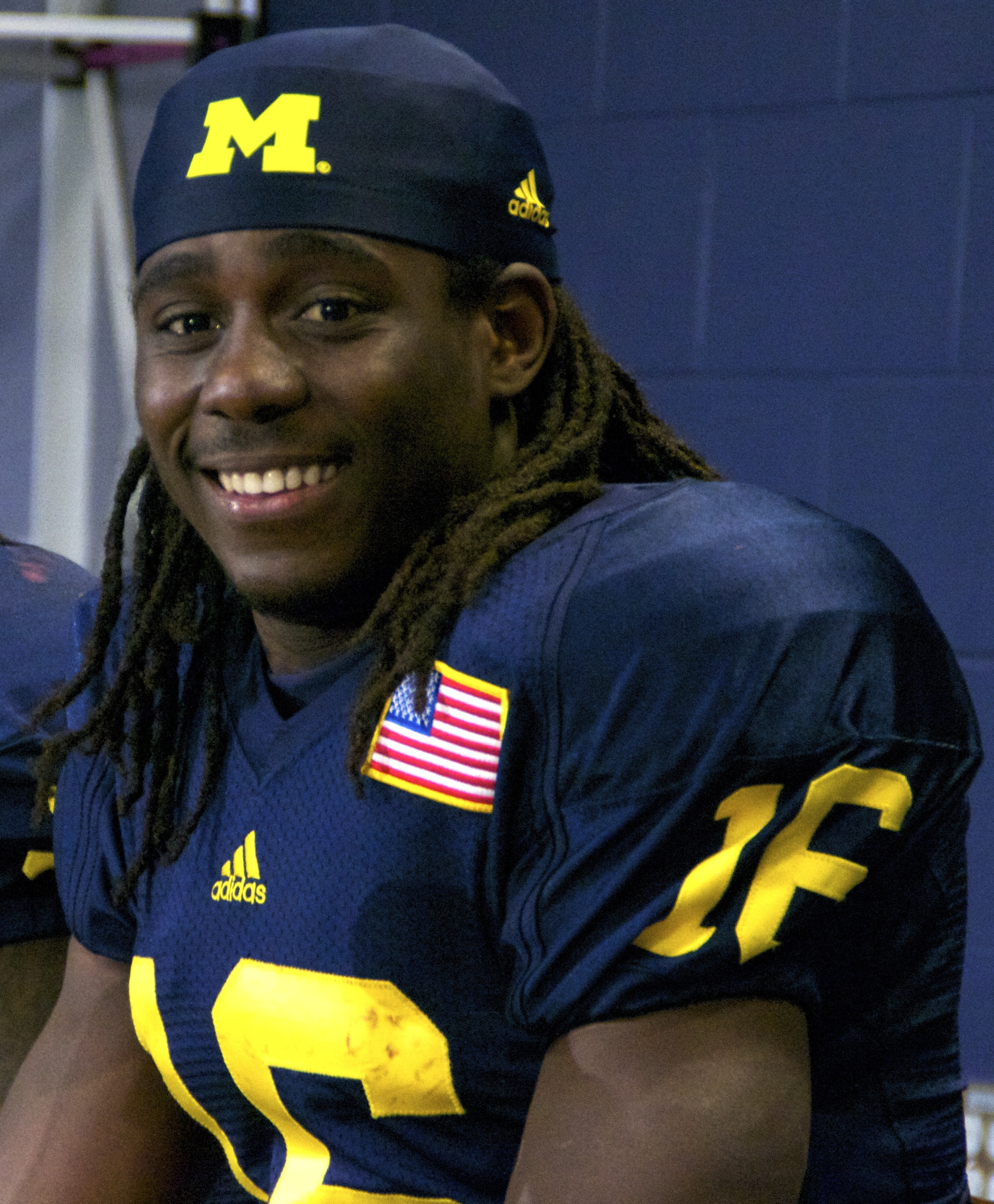
Robinson at a 2011 press conference.

In Michigan's 2011 season opener against Western Michigan, Robinson completed 9 of 13 passes for 98 yards and had 46 rushing yards on eight carries. The game was ended with 1:27 left in the third quarter due to inclement weather.

In Michigan's next game against Notre Dame, Robinson completed 11 of 24 passes for 338 yards with four touchdowns and had 108 yards rushing on 16 carries with a touchdown on a recovered fumble near the goal line. He threw the game-winning touchdown pass to Roy Roundtree with two seconds left in the fourth quarter to defeat the Irish 35–31. The performance moved Robinson into third place in Big Ten history for rushing yards by a quarterback. In recognition of his performance during the game, the Big Ten named Denard Robinson its Offensive Player of the Week, while the Davey O'Brien Award named him its Quarterback of the Week. He was also named Rivals.com's Big Ten and National Player of the Week and was nominated for the Capital One Cup Impact Performance of the Week, which he won by fan vote.

In Michigan's third game, against Eastern Michigan, Robinson posted 198 rushing yards giving him five of the top ten quarterback single-game rushing outputs in conference history.

In Michigan's fourth game, against San Diego State, Robinson tallied three touchdowns in the first half on his way to a 200-yard rushing effort. The effort moved him into second place in Big Ten history in career rushing yards by a quarterback, behind only Antwaan Randle El. He also earned Big Ten Conference Co-Offensive Player of the Week recognition.

On October 8, against Northwestern, Robinson contributed 454 yards of total offense with 337 yards passing and 117 rushing. He scored two rushing touchdowns and had two passing.

On October 15, against Michigan State Robinson was shut down by the Spartan defense throwing for just 123 yards completing 9 of 24 attempts and a costly interception that was returned for a touchdown with 4:31 left in the game. Robinson stated after the game "I got a little beat up," as he was knocked out of the game in the 28–14 loss, his third straight loss in the rivalry.

During Michigan's November 19 victory over Nebraska, Robinson posted 180 yards passing and 83 rushing yards with two rushing touchdowns and two passing touchdowns to earn Co-Big Ten Offensive Player of the Week honors from the conference. He also won the Rivals.com Big Ten Player of the Week and was a nominee for the Capital One Cup Impact Performances of the Week.

On November 26, in a victory over Ohio State, Fitzgerald Toussaint joined Robinson with 1,000 yards for the season, marking the first time since the 1975 team that Michigan had two 1,000-yard rushers. Robinson posted a five-touchdown performance (three passing and two rushing) and became the fourth player in NCAA history to gain 2,000 yards passing and 1,000 yards rushing in a season twice in his career. Robinson totalled 170 yards rushing and earned a share of his fourth Big Ten Offensive Player of the Week recognition for the season. He also repeated as the Rivals.com Big Ten Player of the Week and was a College Football Performance Awards honorable mention as the National Quarterback of the Week.

Following the 2011 Big Ten Conference football season, he earned second-team All-Conference recognition from the media. He was voted team MVP for the second year in a row. He was a Sports Illustrated All-American honorable mention selectee.

=== 2012 football season ===
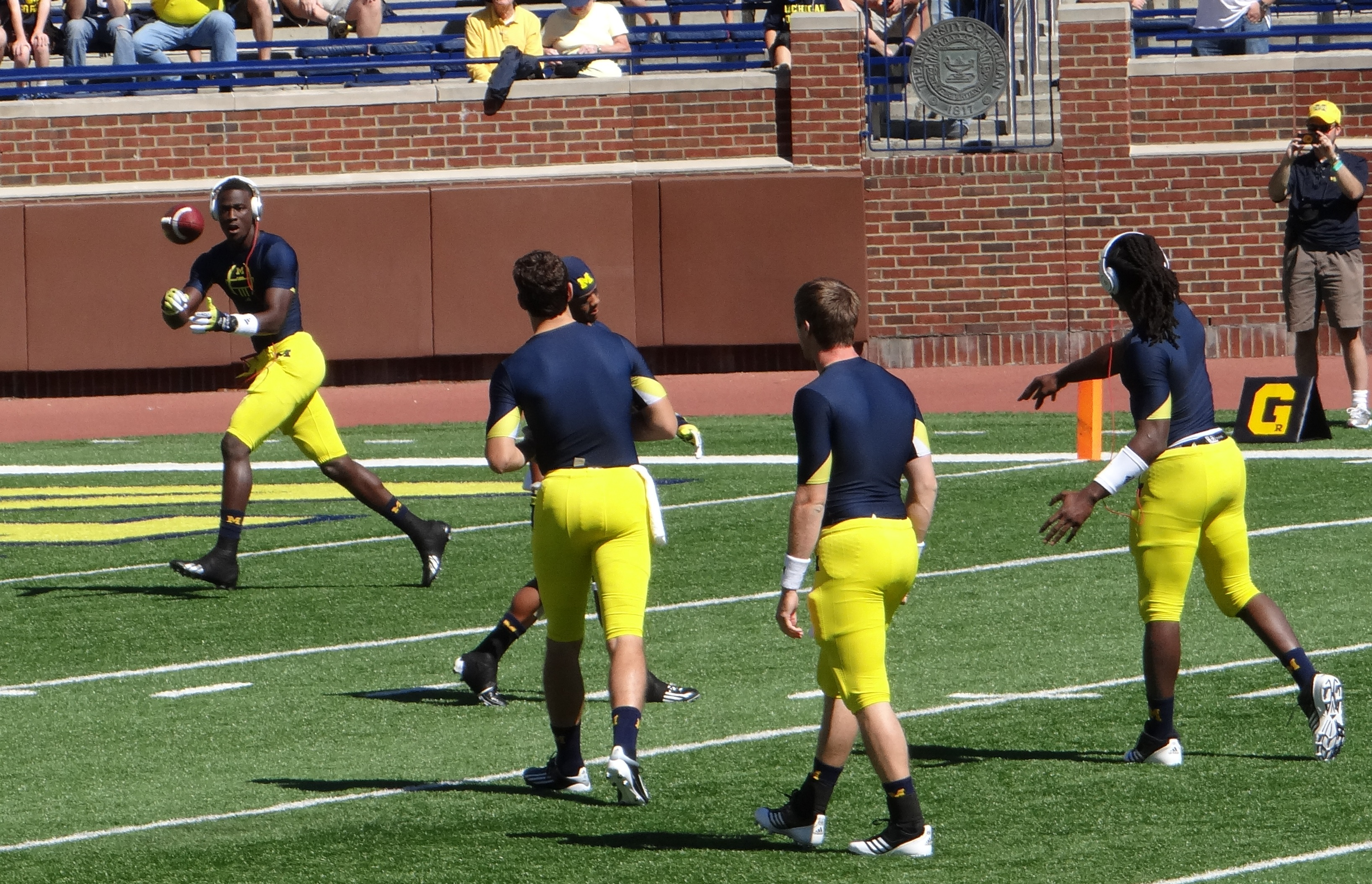
Robinson passing to converted quarterback Devin Gardner.

In August 2012, Robinson and teammate Taylor Lewan were selected by the media among the five "Players to Watch" in Big Ten Legends Division. Robinson was elected team captain.

After a disappointing performance in a season-opening, 41–14 loss to Alabama (27 rushing yards, 200 passing yards, and two interceptions), Robinson rebounded in Michigan's second game against Air Force. Robinson contributed 426 yards of total offense against Air Force (208 passing yards, 218 rushing yards, two rushing touchdowns, and two passing touchdowns). For his performance, he was named Big Ten Offensive Player of the Week and received College Football Performance Award honors as National Player of the Week and National Quarterback of the Week. He became the first NCAA athlete to both rush and pass for 200 yards in a game on three separate occasions. It marked the first time since the 1993 Rose Bowl performance by Tyrone Wheatley that a Michigan player had two rushing touchdowns of over 50 yards.

On September 15, 2012, playing against UMass, Robinson tallied 397 yards of total offense in three quarters of play, including 291 passing yards, three passing touchdowns, and 369 yards of total offense in the first half. With the performance against UMass, Robinson passed Tom Brady on Michigan's all-time passing yardage list.

On September 22, Robinson was responsible for five turnovers, four first-half interceptions and a lost fumble on the opening drive of the second half, in a 13–6 loss to Notre Dame. The Detroit Free Press called it "the worst game of his Michigan career."

On October 7, Robinson rushed for 235 yards on 24 carries and threw for 105 yards against Purdue. His performance gave him 3,905 career rushing yards, moving past Antwaan Randle El as the Big Ten career leader in rushing yards by a quarterback. He also tied Mike Hart's Michigan school record with his fifth career 200-yard rushing game. The 235 yards rushing was also a personal best for Robinson in a Big Ten game. The performance won him recognition as the Maxwell Award Player of the Week and a Manning Award "Star of the Week". It also earned him his ninth Big Ten Offensive Player of the Week award, tying a career record set in 1999 by Ron Dayne. Robinson was named a semifinalist for the Davey O'Brien Award and a finalist for the Johnny Unitas Golden Arm Award.

After suffering an injury and being knocked out of Michigan's game with Nebraska (a 23–9 loss to the Cornhuskers) on October 27, Robinson returned to the lineup for the last home game of the 2012 season, a 42–17 victory over Iowa. Playing in his final game at Michigan Stadium, Robinson split his playing time between the tailback, quarterback, and wide receiver positions. He accounted for 122 yards, including 98 rushing yards on 13 carries and 24 receiving yards on two receptions. With the injury to the ulnar nerve in his right elbow, Robinson did not throw the ball during the game and was forced to carry the ball in his right hand.

In his final regular season game, the annual Michigan–Ohio State rivalry game, Robinson rushed for 122 yards on 10 carries, including a 67-yard touchdown run with a minute to go in the first half. He was a 2012 All-Big Ten honorable mention selection by the media for the 2012 Wolverines. Denard played his final game at Michigan on January 1, 2013, in the Outback Bowl against South Carolina. In the game, he surpassed Pat White's FBS record for career rushing yards by a quarterback by 15 yards to reach a total of 4,495. On December 28, 2015, Keenan Reynolds achieved a total of 4,559, surpassing Robinson.

=== NCAA Football 14 cover vote ===
After Robinson's successful collegiate career, he was voted as the next athlete to be on the cover of NCAA Football 14. The contest achieved over six million votes making Robinson the first Michigan quarterback to be on the cover and third Wolverine overall. He is the first since Heisman Trophy winner Desmond Howard in 2006, with the other being Charles Woodson on the 1999 version of the game. The voting, which took place on social media websites such as Facebook and Twitter opened in mid December 2012, lasted until March 8, 2013. During this time, the contest had gone through several rounds of voting, until finally being shrunken down to the final two, where Robinson faced off against Texas A&M wide receiver Ryan Swope. Robinson lasted through all voting rounds, and outlasted Alabama Crimson Tide running back Eddie Lacy, and possible National Football League 1st round draft selections Jarvis Jones of the Georgia Bulldogs and standout tight end Tyler Eifert of the Notre Dame Fighting Irish. The contest gained attention worldwide, with former students and athletes vouching support for their former schools. Decorated Olympian Michael Phelps was one of many celebrities to publicly show his support for his former school (he attended the University of Michigan as a non-degree candidate while his coach Bob Bowman served as the university's swimming coach), as well as rap artist/celebrity Snoop Dogg, who does not have any ties to the university itself.

== Professional career ==
=== Pre-draft ===
After his final season at Michigan, Robinson stated that he was open to playing any position in the National Football League. Some suggested that he would have a better chance of being drafted by an NFL team if he switched to cornerback, receiver, running back or kick returner because of his quickness – 4.35 in the 40 yard dash. CBS Sports' Mike Freeman said his talents would be wasted on the defensive side of the ball.

Robinson participated in the 2013 Senior Bowl at wide receiver. In the game, Robinson caught two passes for 21 yards and rushed the ball once for a three-yard loss. His performance in the game and the preceding week of practice was regarded as unimpressive and his draft stock fell to the late rounds.

Robinson was the only Wolverine from the 2012–2013 team who was invited to participate in the NFL combine. He was not invited as a quarterback, but rather as a wide receiver, but he did intend to throw and return kickoffs and punts on his Pro Day. On the Pro Day, he did not do quarterback drills, but he did return punts, made catches while running routes, and also did running back drills. Scouts concluded he should become a running back first before developing into a wideout.

Pre-draft measurables
| Height | Weight | Arm length | Hand span | Wingspan | 40-yard dash | 10-yard split | 20-yard split | 20-yard shuttle | Three-cone drill | Vertical jump | Broad jump |
|---|---|---|---|---|---|---|---|---|---|---|---|
| 5 ft 10 1/2 in (1.79 m) | 199 lb (90 kg) | 32 5/8 in (0.83 m) | 9 in (0.23 m) | 6 ft 5 in (1.96 m) | 4.43 s | 1.58 s | 2.61 s | 4.22 s | 7.09 s | 36.5 in (0.93 m) | 10 ft 3 in (3.12 m) |
All values from NFL Combine

Robinson's 40-yard dash official time of 4.43 was the tenth fastest on February 24 (quarterback, running back and wide receiver day). After disappointing as a receiver at the Senior Bowl, Robinson caught every pass during the gauntlet drill.

=== 2013 season ===
Robinson was selected by the Jacksonville Jaguars in the 5th round of the 2013 NFL draft with the 135th overall selection. He was selected as a running back when his name was finally called. His position is referred to by the team as "offensive weapon", which involves playing running back, wide receiver, and kickoff returner. He was also to contribute as a quarterback in the Wildcat formation. In midseason, they moved Robinson to the number two position on the depth chart at running back. On November 24, he attempted a forward pass to Cecil Shorts III, but it was broken up by Johnathan Joseph of the Houston Texans. This was the first of only two total career pass attempts for Robinson in the NFL. As a rookie, Robinson played in all 16 games and totaled 66 yards rushing on 20 carries but no receptions for the 2013 Jacksonville Jaguars.

=== 2014 season ===
On September 7, 2014, in week 1 of the 2014 season, Robinson recorded his first NFL reception. On September 28, Robinson made his first career NFL start against the San Diego Chargers. On October 19 in week 7 of 2014, Robinson made his first start at running back in place of an injured Toby Gerhart. He had an NFL-career-high 127 yards rushing on 22 carries against the Cleveland Browns to help the 2014 Jacksonville Jaguars end a nine-game losing streak. It was the first 100-yard rushing game for the team for the season and the most rushing yards by a Jaguar in two seasons. He posted career highs in yards and carries and also scored his first NFL touchdown. When Robinson had 108 on 18 carries the following week against Miami, he became the first Jaguar to have back-to-back 100-yard games since Maurice Jones-Drew in 2011. On December 7, Robinson endured a foot sprain against the 2014 Houston Texans and he was placed on season-ending injured reserve on December 10. He finished 2014 with 135 carries, 582 yards, and 4 touchdowns.

=== 2015 season ===
On September 20, in the second week of the 2015 NFL season, Robinson endured a medial collateral ligament (MCL) sprain in his left knee against the Miami Dolphins while serving as a backup to T. J. Yeldon. The injury caused him to miss the next three games. On December 13, Yeldon suffered the same injury against the Indianapolis Colts making way for Robinson to tally 75 yards on 14 carries and his first and only touchdown of the season that day.

=== 2016–2017 ===
In May 2017, Robinson tried out with the Chicago Bears during their rookie minicamp. In June 2017, he tried out at the New York Jets minicamp.

=== Atlanta Legends ===
Robinson signed with the Atlanta Legends of the Alliance of American Football (AAF) as a running back for the league's inaugural 2019 season. He appeared in seven of the team's eight games, making one start. In Week 4 against the Arizona Hotshots, he recorded a season-high nine carries for 43 yards and scored his lone touchdown of the season. He finished the season with 24 carries for 66 yards and a touchdown while adding seven receptions for 37 yards.

== Career statistics ==
=== NFL ===
| Year | Team | Games | | Rushing | | | | | Receiving | | | | | Fumbles | |
| Year | Team | GP | GS | Att | Yds | Avg | Lng | TD | Rec | Yds | Avg | Lng | TD | Fum | Lost |
|---|---|---|---|---|---|---|---|---|---|---|---|---|---|---|---|
| 2013 | JAX | 16 | 0 | 20 | 66 | 3.3 | 24 | 0 | 0 | 0 | 0.0 | 0 | 0 | 3 | 2 |
| 2014 | JAX | 13 | 9 | 135 | 582 | 4.3 | 41 | 4 | 23 | 124 | 5.4 | 19 | 0 | 2 | 2 |
| 2015 | JAX | 13 | 3 | 67 | 266 | 4.0 | 31 | 1 | 21 | 164 | 7.8 | 16 | 0 | 3 | 2 |
| 2016 | JAX | 13 | 1 | 41 | 144 | 3.5 | 9 | 0 | 3 | 22 | 7.3 | 11 | 0 | 0 | 0 |
| Career | | 55 | 13 | 262 | 1,058 | 4.0 | 41 | 5 | 47 | 310 | 6.6 | 19 | 0 | 8 | 6 |

=== College ===
| Year | Team | Games | | | Passing | | | | | | | | Rushing | | | |
| Year | Team | GP | GS | Record (Note: Accounts for only GS as a QB. On 11/14/09 and 11/17/12 Robinson started at RB.) | Cmp | Att | Pct | Yds | Y/A | TD | Int | Rtg | Att | Yds | Avg | TD |
|---|---|---|---|---|---|---|---|---|---|---|---|---|---|---|---|---|
| 2009 | Michigan | 12 | 1 | — | 14 | 31 | 45.2 | 188 | 6.1 | 2 | 4 | 91.6 | 69 | 351 | 5.1 | 5 |
| 2010 | Michigan | 13 | 13 | 7–6 | 182 | 291 | 62.5 | 2,570 | 8.8 | 18 | 11 | 149.6 | 256 | 1,702 | 6.6 | 14 |
| 2011 | Michigan | 13 | 13 | 11–2 | 142 | 258 | 55.0 | 2,173 | 8.4 | 20 | 15 | 139.7 | 221 | 1,176 | 5.3 | 16 |
| 2012 | Michigan | 11 | 10 | 5–4 | 89 | 167 | 53.3 | 1,319 | 7.9 | 9 | 9 | 129.6 | 177 | 1,266 | 7.2 | 7 |
| Career | | 49 | 37 | 23–12 | 427 | 747 | 57.2 | 6,250 | 8.36 | 49 | 39 | 138.6 | 723 | 4,495 | 6.2 | 42 |

==== Michigan's all-time total offense leaders ====
===== Single game =====
As Michigan's starting quarterback, Robinson has seven of the top ten single-game performances in total yards in Michigan history, as reflected in the following list of the all-time, single-game leaders.

| Rank | Player | Year | Opponent | Passing yards | Rushing yards | Total offense |
| 1 | Devin Gardner | 2013 | Indiana | 503 | 81 | 584 |
| 2 | Jake Rudock | 2015 | Indiana | 440 | 64 | 504 |
| 3 | Denard Robinson | 2010 | Notre Dame | 244 | 258 | 502 |
| 4 | Denard Robinson | 2010 | Indiana | 277 | 217 | 494 |
| 5 | Devin Gardner | 2013 | Ohio State | 451 | 10 | 461 |
| 6 | Denard Robinson | 2011 | Northwestern | 337 | 117 | 454 |
| 7 | Denard Robinson | 2011 | Notre Dame | 338 | 108 | 446 |
| 8 | Denard Robinson | 2012 | Air Force | 208 | 218 | 426 |
| 9 | Denard Robinson | 2012 | UMass | 291 | 106 | 397 |
| 10 | Denard Robinson | 2010 | Connecticut | 186 | 197 | 383 |

===== Single season =====
Michigan's top five single-season performances in total offense are set forth below. Robinson holds the single-season record for total yards with 4272, set in 2010.

| Rank | Player | Year | Passing yards | Rushing yards | Total offense |
| 1 | Denard Robinson | 2010 | 2570 | 1702 | 4272 |
| 2 | Devin Gardner | 2013 | 2960 | 483 | 3443 |
| 3 | Denard Robinson | 2011 | 2173 | 1176 | 3348 |
| 4 | John Navarre | 2003 | 3331 | (91) | 3240 |
| 5 | John Navarre | 2002 | 2905 | (16) | 2889 |

==== Big Ten single-game quarterback rushing yards leaders ====
| Rank | Player | Date | Team | Opponent | Rushing yards |
| 1 | Denard Robinson | September 11, 2010 | Michigan | Notre Dame | 258 |
| 2 | Denard Robinson | October 7, 2012 | Michigan | Purdue | 235 |
| 3 | Denard Robinson | September 7, 2012 | Michigan | Air Force | 218 |
| T-4 | Mike Kafka | November 1, 2008 | Northwestern | Minnesota | 217 |
| T-4 | Denard Robinson | October 2, 2010 | Michigan | Indiana | 217 |
| 6 | Gary Danielson | September 23, 1972 | Purdue | Washington | 213 |
| 7 | Antwaan Randle El | October 21, 2000 | Indiana | Minnesota | 210 |
| 8 | Antwaan Randle El | November 4, 2000 | Indiana | Illinois | 209 |
| 9 | Taylor Martinez | November 3, 2012 | Nebraska | Michigan State | 205 |
| 10 | Denard Robinson | September 24, 2011 | Michigan | San Diego State | 200 |

== Career highlights ==
=== Awards and honors ===
College

- Chicago Tribune Silver Football (Big Ten MVP) (2010)
- Big Ten Offensive Player of the Year (2010)
- 2010 All-American (1st team – FWAA, 3rd team – AP, honorable mention – SI & CFN)
- First-team All-Big Ten (2010, media)
- Second-team All-Big Ten (2011, media)
- Led Big Ten in rushing (2010)
- Led Big Ten in total offense (2010)
- 2011 All-American (honorable mention – SI)
- Gator Bowl MVP (2011)
- 2012 All-Big Ten Conference honorable mention

High school

- FHSAA state champion 4 × 100 metres

=== Records ===
==== NCAA (all divisions) ====
- First 1500-yard passing/1500-yard rushing season
- Most rushing yards by a QB in a career

==== Division I FBS ====
- Division I FBS 200-yard passing/200-yard rushing regular season games (career and season)

==== Big Ten Conference ====
- Rushing yards by a QB (single-game, single-season and career)
- Total offense (single-season)
- Big Ten Offensive Player of the Week awards (career)

==== Michigan ====
- Total offense (career)
- Rushing yards on the road (single game)
- Passing yards (single half)
- 200-yard rushing games (career)
- Yards per carry (career, min 250 carries)

==== Other ====
- Notre Dame Stadium longest run from scrimmage

== Coaching and personnel career ==
=== Jacksonville University ===
On July 29, 2019, Jacksonville University announced the hiring of Robinson as an offensive analyst and assistant to special teams coordinator Steven Sylvester. On December 3, 2019, the university announced that they would be discontinuing their football program after the conclusion of the 2019 season.

=== Jacksonville Jaguars ===
On June 12, 2020, the Jacksonville Jaguars hired Robinson as an offensive quality control coach. After Urban Meyer was hired as the new Jaguars head coach, Robinson moved to the front office, where he served as a college scouting assistant.

=== University of Michigan ===
On February 23, 2022, the University of Michigan announced the hiring of Robinson as the assistant director of player personnel for the Michigan Wolverines football team, marking Robinson’s return to his alma mater. During the 2023 Michigan Wolverines football season, Robinson was implicated for having a potential role in the team's sign-stealing scandal. On May 14, 2024, Robinson resigned as a member of Michigan's staff as a result of an operating while intoxicated arrest one month earlier.

On August 15, 2025, the NCAA ruled that Robinson would received a three-year show-cause penalty running through January 2028. Robinson did not respond to the NCAA Notice of Allegations and did not attend the hearing.

== Personal life ==
In July 2016, Robinson was found passed out in a partially submerged vehicle. Police determined he was not impaired, and he was not charged with anything.

On April 15, 2024, Robinson was charged with operating while intoxicated in Ann Arbor. He was arrested after being involved in a single-vehicle crash, according to the Ann Arbor Police Department.

== See also ==
- Michigan Wolverines football statistical leaders
