= Greg Carter (American football) =

Greg Carter (born July 29, 1954) is an American football coach and former collegiate and professional baseball player. He is currently the head coach of the Oak Park High School Knights in Oak Park, Michigan in Metro Detroit. He previously coached the Inkster High School Vikings in Inkster, Michigan and the Saint Martin de Porres High School Eagles in Detroit, Michigan. He has been a coach on 12 Michigan state championship football teams, eight as an assistant coach and four as a head coach. Carter previously played baseball at Kentucky State University, where he was selected as a college baseball All-American, and in the Detroit Tigers minor league organization. In 2009, he was inducted in Kentucky State University Hall of Fame.

== High school and college ==
Carter was born in Detroit, Michigan. He was an All-American baseball player and quarterback at Mackenzie High School in Detroit. In his junior year of high school, he was part of both the Detroit Public School League championship baseball team and the Mackenzie football team that won the divisional title, both led by coach Ron "Thomp" Thompson.

After high school, Carter attended Kentucky State University. Carter played baseball as a catcher at Kentucky State and was selected as a college baseball All-American. He helped lead Kentucky State to its first NAIA baseball championship in 1976.

== Minor League Baseball ==
After playing baseball at Kentucky State, Carter played Minor League Baseball for one season, in 1976, in the Detroit Tigers farm system, having stints with the Montgomery Rebels, Lakeland Tigers, Bristol Tigers.

== Coaching career ==
=== St. Martin de Porres High School ===
In 1978, Carter starting coaching at Saint Martin de Porres High School as the assistant under his former football and baseball coach, Coach Ron "Thomp" Thompson. From 1978 to 1994, Carter won eight state championship titles as the assistant coach. In 1994, Carter became head coach, after the death of Thompson. As head coach, Carter kept the program going and led St. Martin de Porres to four more state championship titles and a runner up title. During Carter's tenure at St. Martin de Porres, he coached many talented players, including Notre Dame wide receiver David Grimes. Despite the success of the athletic program, the Archdiocese of Detroit closed the school in 2005.

=== Inkster High School ===
In 2005, Carter relocated to Inkster High School as the school's head football coach and athletic director. Before Carter came to Inkster, the school's football team had never been to the playoffs. In his first year as head coach, Carter led his team to the playoffs. In 2006, his team won the district and regional championships and was the runner-up in the state championship game at Ford Field. From 2005 to 2010, Carter went to the state finals three times. Carter coached many talented athletes at Inkster, including several who went on to play in for NCAA Division I Football Bowl Subdivision teams: Devin Gardner (quarterback for the Michigan Wolverines), Cameron Gordon (Michigan Wolverines football player), Joshua Howard (Ball State football player), Renty Rollins (Jackson State football player), Armond Stanten (Central Michigan football player), and Deon Butler (Central Michigan football player).

=== Oak Park High School ===
In February 2011, Carter was hired as the head football coach at Oak Park High School. In his first year as the head coach, Carter took a team that won only two games in 2010 and led them to a 5-4 record.

=== Coaching achievements ===
Carter has many achievements as an assistant and head coach. He has been a coach on 12 state championship teams, eight as an assistant coach and four as a head coach. His teams have advanced to the state finals 16 times.

== Awards ==
Carter has won numerous awards. He was inducted in the Catholic High School League Hall of Fame for coaches in 2003. He was named Ed Lauder Person of the Year through the Catholic High School League in 2005. Also, in 2009 he was inducted in Kentucky State University Hall of Fame for baseball.

== Personal life ==
Carter is married to Deborah Carter. They have two children Amber and Adam Carter.
