= Devin Gardner =

American gridiron football player (born 1991)

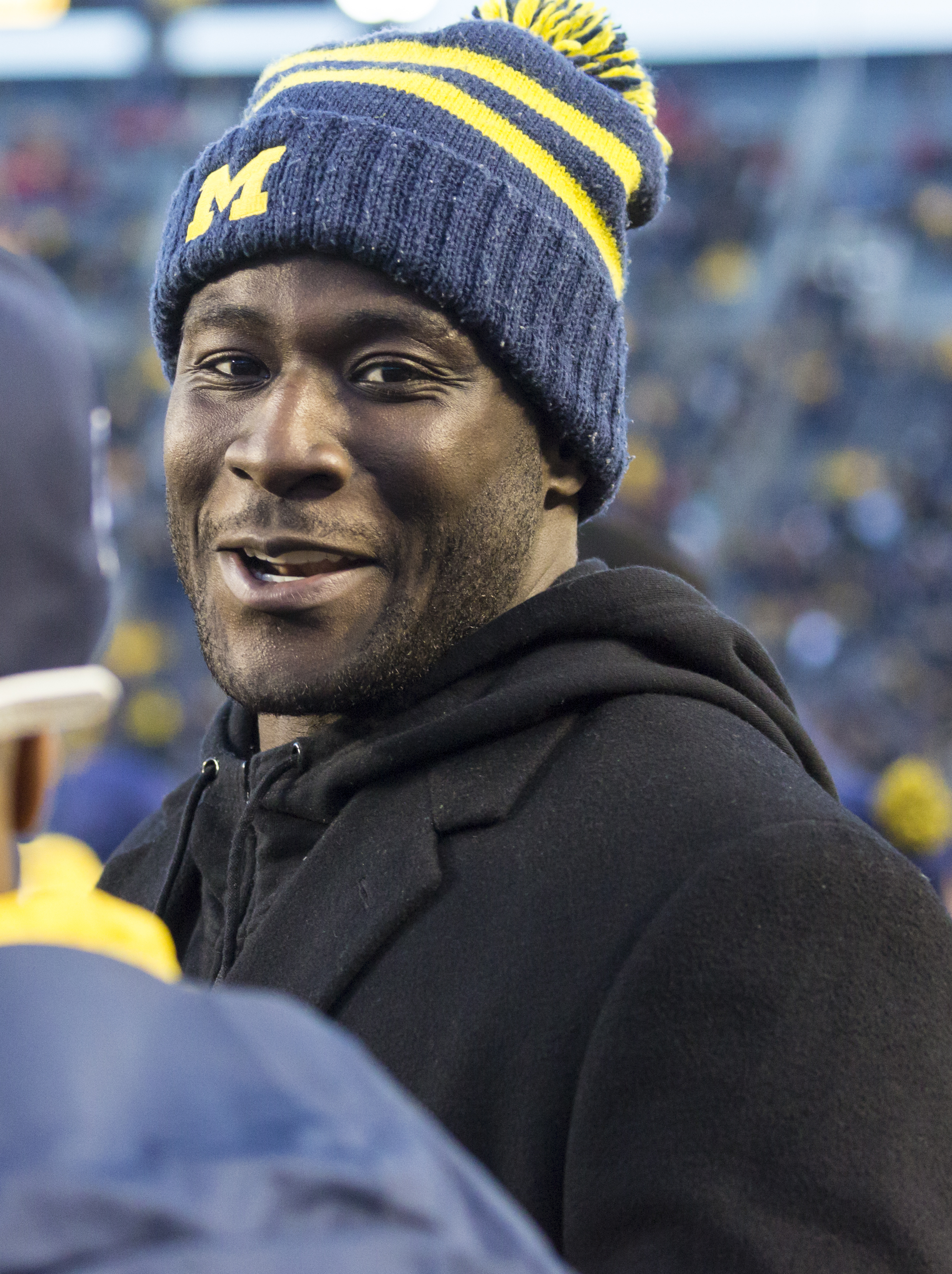
- Gardner in 2018

No. 7, 12, 98
- Position: Quarterback

Personal information
- Born: December 14, 1991 (age 34); Detroit, Michigan, U.S.
- Listed height: 6 ft 4 in (1.93 m)
- Listed weight: 218 lb (99 kg)

Career information
- High school: Inkster (Inkster, Michigan)
- College: Michigan (2010–2014)
- NFL draft: 2015: undrafted

Career history
- New England Patriots (2015)*; Pittsburgh Steelers (2015)*; Sagamihara Rise (2016–2017); Saskatchewan Roughriders (2018)
- * Offseason or practice squad member only

Awards and highlights
- X-League Rookie of the Year (2016)
- Stats at Pro Football Reference
- Stats at CFL.ca

Devin Jaymes Gardner (born December 14, 1991) is an American former football player. He played college football for the Michigan Wolverines. He was signed as an undrafted free agent by the New England Patriots of the National Football League (NFL). He played professionally in Japan for two seasons.

At the University of Michigan, Gardner was the starting quarterback for the Wolverines from 2012 to 2014. Early in the 2013 season, Gardner was awarded Tom Harmon's Michigan Football Legends jersey, becoming the first Michigan player to wear No. 98 in over 70 years. Through the first seven games of the 2013 season, Gardner had 1,779 passing yards, 660 rushing yards, and 22 touchdowns (13 passing, 9 rushing). On October 19, 2013, Gardner broke John Navarre's Michigan single-game record with 503 passing yards. He also broke Denard Robinson's Michigan single-game record with 584 yards of total offense.

As a high school senior, Gardner was rated as the No. 1 dual-threat quarterback in the United States by Rivals.com and the No. 5 quarterback by ESPNU. He enrolled at the University of Michigan in January 2010 and saw limited action in the 2010 and 2011 seasons. During the first half of the 2012 season, he converted to the wide receiver position, but switched back to quarterback after Denard Robinson sustained an elbow injury.

== Early life ==
=== University of Detroit Jesuit High School ===
As a sophomore in 2007, Gardner played football for the University of Detroit Jesuit High School and Academy. He missed five games during his sophomore year because of disciplinary issues, but returned for the final four games of the season. Gardner described the problems he experienced in his sophomore year as a turning point: "I had never sat out before, and that hurt a lot. It was a bad feeling, and I did a lot of growing up. I just knew I had to get better." After the coach of his team left, Gardner's grades began to decrease. He wanted to transfer to Saint Martin de Porres High School but the school had closed.

=== Inkster High School ===
Prior to his junior season, Gardner transferred to Inkster High School in Inkster, Michigan. He was Inkster's starting quarterback under head coach Greg Carter, who led Detroit's Saint Martin de Porres High School to three state championships.

As a junior in 2008, Gardner led Inkster to a state title game and was responsible for 48 touchdowns, 26 passing and 22 rushing. He also compiled 3,287 yards of total offense with 1,886 passing yards and 1,401 rushing yards. He also helped lead Inkster's basketball team to the state semifinals in March 2009.

As a senior in 2009, Gardner again led Inkster to the state finals game. In the second game of the season, Gardner compiled 340 yards passing and 101 yards rushing against East Kentwood High School. The highlight of Gardner's senior season came in Inkster's final regular season game against Steubenville High School in Steubenville, Ohio. Inkster needed a win to advance to the playoffs, and Steubenville had a 60-game home winning streak. Steubenville led 29–28 with 1:19 left in the game. With 39 seconds left, Gardner threw a 63-yard touchdown pass for the win. Gardner described the game-winning drive against Steubenville as follows:

"First I threw an out and we got out of bounds. (Receiver) Jonathan Taylor got hurt and so he had to come out. Another receiver came in and we did just a regular ol' route. We didn't do nothing special, but they all jumped the out route and left the fly on the outside wide open. I just threw it to (Vorheese Zanders) in between the safety and corner and he made a big play. He made one guy miss, another guy fell down, and he scored."

Gardner accounted for 330 yards (275 yards passing, 55 rushing) and five touchdowns (four passing) in the win over Steubenville.

After the win over Steubenville, Gardner led Inkster to four straight wins in the playoffs, including a 51–19 win over Dearborn Edsel Ford High School, a 50–28 win over Redford Thurston High School, and a 35–7 win over Southgate Anderson High School. Gardner led Inkster to its second straight state finals game. Inkster averaged 31 points per game in the 12 games before the final, but lost 27–6 against Lowell High School in the Division 2 title game. Gardner compiled only 134 passing yards in the title game and minus-26 rushing yards after being sacked three times.

In an interview with ESPN in the fall of 2009, Gardner described his passion for the quarterback position: "With me, you better prepare for everything you think could happen because anything can happen when I've got the ball in my hands. I've got the ball in my hands every play, and it's my show."

=== Combines and rankings ===
After compiling impressive statistics as a junior, Gardner was invited to a number of combines and camps in the Summer of 2009. In June 2009, Gardner participated in the Nike camp in Champaign, Illinois. In July 2009, Gardner participated in the Elite 11 quarterback camp at Soka University in Aliso Viejo, California, as one of the 12 invited quarterbacks. Gardner earned counselor awards for best footwork and work in the classroom at the Elite 11 camp. After watching Gardner perform at the Elite 11, JC Shurburtt wrote for ESPN.com that, "Gardner has also surprised many. His hustle, leadership and athleticism add up to a tremendous maturity that will help him compete early for playing time in Ann Arbor." Barry Every, national analyst for Rivals.com, ranked Gardner as the top overall quarterback at the Elite 11 camp based on long-term potential and the ability to win football games, and added, "He may not be as big or fast as current Ohio State quarterback Terrelle Pryor, but he is a close second."

In September 2009, Gardner was ranked as the top quarterback prospect in the United States by Rivals.com. He was ranked as the No. 4 quarterback nationally by Scout.com and the No. 5 quarterback in the ESPNU 150. In November 2009, Allen Trieu of Scout.com said of Gardner:

"He is considered one of the top handful of quarterbacks in the country and is firmly entrenched as a five-star prospect. As far as upside goes, I don't see many quarterbacks that have his potential. He has improved as a passer, but I think what is overlooked is that he has gotten faster and has broken longer runs. We've also seen several times where he has put this team on his shoulders and pulled out victories in tough situations."

College recruiting
Name	Hometown	School	Height	Weight	40^{‡}	Commit date
Devin Gardner; QB	Inkster, Michigan	Inkster (MI)	6 ft 4 in (1.93 m)	198 lb (90 kg)	4.57	Apr 3, 2009
Devin Gardner; QB	Recruit ratings: Scout: Rivals: (81)					
Overall recruit ranking: Scout: 43 (national), 5 (QB) Rivals: 132 (national), 1 (Dual-threat quarterback), 2 (MI) ESPN: 128 (national), 5 (QB)
Note: In many cases, Scout, Rivals, 247Sports, On3, and ESPN may conflict in their listings of height and weight.; In these cases, the average was taken. ESPN grades are on a 100-point scale.; Sources: "Michigan Football Commitments". Rivals.; "2010 Michigan Football Commits". Scout.; "ESPN". ESPN.; "Scout.com Team Recruiting Rankings". Scout.; "2010 Team Ranking". Rivals.com.

=== Under Armour All-America Game ===
At end of his senior year in high school, Gardner played in the Under Armour All-America Game. He threw an 11-yard touchdown pass to Darius White to help the White team win the contest. After his appearance in the All-America Game, Gardner said, "It was the greatest experience of my life. Even greater than the Steubenville win that (Inkster) had (during the regular season) – which was a monumental for the city of Inkster and the U.S. state of Michigan, even. This is just another monumental event."

Former NFL head coach Sam Wyche coached the opposing Black team and praised Gardner after the game. Wyche said, "Devin is going to be a big-time player at Michigan....Devin has a great smile. He is going to sell a lot of product for somebody. He's got a great personality. He's smart – you can change directions with him and it doesn't bother him at all. He is ready to go."

== College career ==
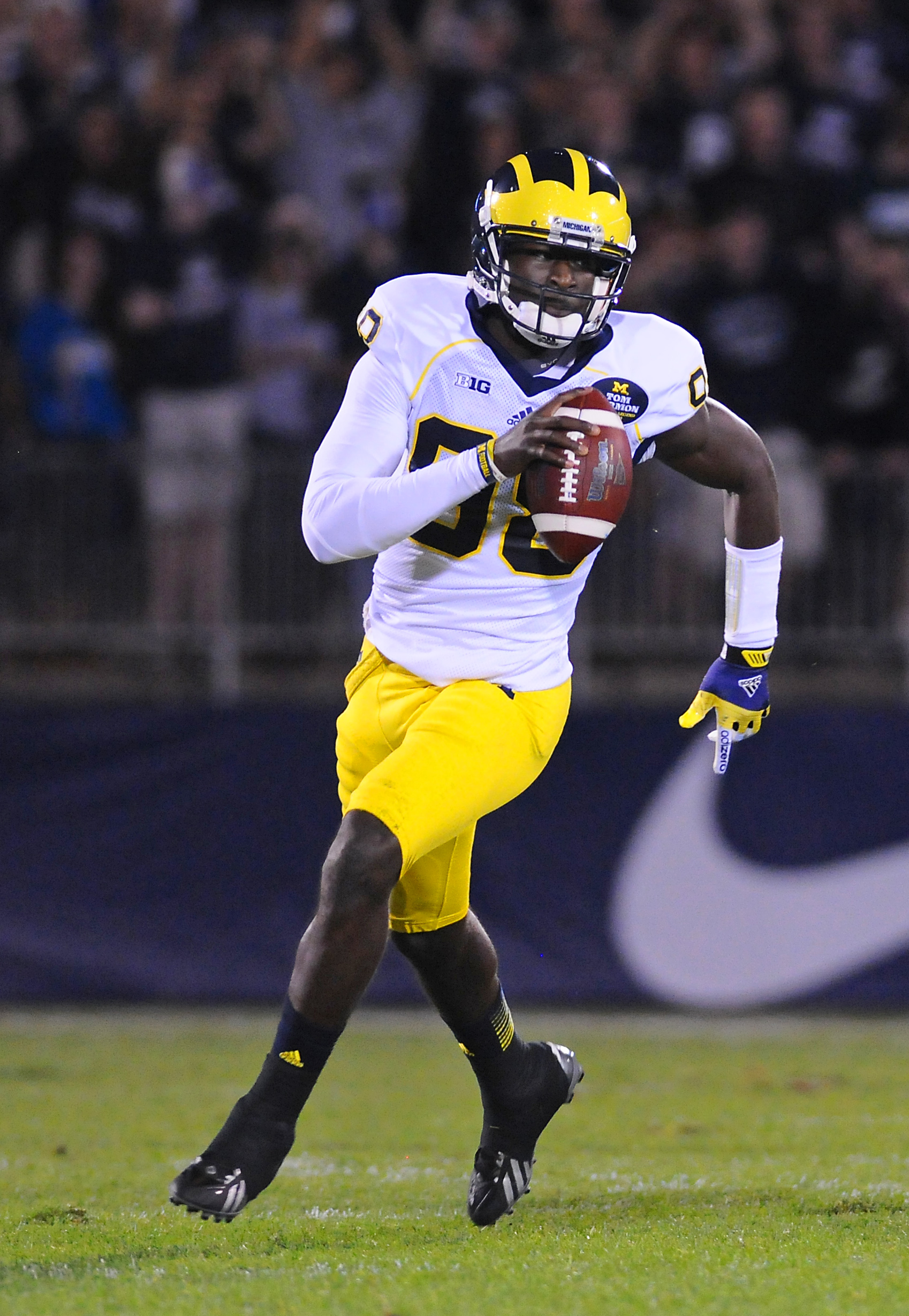
Gardner with the ball in 2013

=== Commitment to Michigan ===
In the spring of 2009, Gardner gave a verbal commitment to Michigan. Gardner explained his choice as follows: "I feel great, like there was no other place that I would be able to be as comfortable as I am now at a different school. It was just the only decision that I could think of. When I go up there it's like a family atmosphere. Sometimes at other schools it seems sort of fake if you will but at this school I felt like they were real. The big thing was that I was their first choice. They wanted other guys but expressed to me I was their top guy and that's the biggest factor." Gardner received offers from more than 15 colleges, including Notre Dame, Nebraska, Oregon, West Virginia, Cincinnati, Wisconsin, Iowa, Florida and LSU. He reported that his second choice was Florida and his third was LSU.

The Detroit Free Press wrote in September 2009 that Gardner's "dual-threat abilities make him an ideal candidate to run Rich Rodriguez's version of the spread offense. Inkster coach Greg Carter expected Gardner to thrive at Michigan: "We definitely have a similar offense. A lot of the things they do may be what made them think he could do well there. We run the spread, have four receivers at times, sometimes three receivers and two backs. So we play similar.... There was nothing we put in that he couldn't handle."

=== 2010 season ===
Gardner enrolled early in January 2010.

In December 2009, Tom Luginbill, national recruiting director of ESPN Scouts Inc., said he believed Gardner would compete for Michigan's starting quarterback job in 2010. Luginbill said, "There's no doubt he's got the physical tools to do so." When the Detroit Free Press asked Gardner in December 2009 whether he saw himself starting as a freshman, Gardner said, "Of course I see myself doing that." Gardner played in two games during his freshman season. He completed seven of ten passes for a total of 85 yards and one touchdown. Gardner also rushed for a total of 21 yards on seven rushing attempts, and finished with one rushing touchdown.

=== 2011 season ===
In Gardner's second season at Michigan, Gardner played as a backup behind starting quarterback Denard Robinson, for a second straight year. He appeared in eight of 13 games completing 11 of 23 passes for one touchdown, and rushing for a total of 53 yards with a total of one rushing touchdown. Gardner was featured mostly in offensive coordinator Al Borges' "deuce formation" featuring Denard Robinson in either the slot receiver position, or at running back, and with Devin Gardner at the quarterback position. He played against Northwestern, Michigan State, and Illinois due to an injury to Robinson, and he also appeared in victories over Nebraska and Minnesota. Gardner's touchdown pass to Martavious Odoms in Michigan's game against Illinois sealed a victory for the Wolverines.

=== 2012 season ===
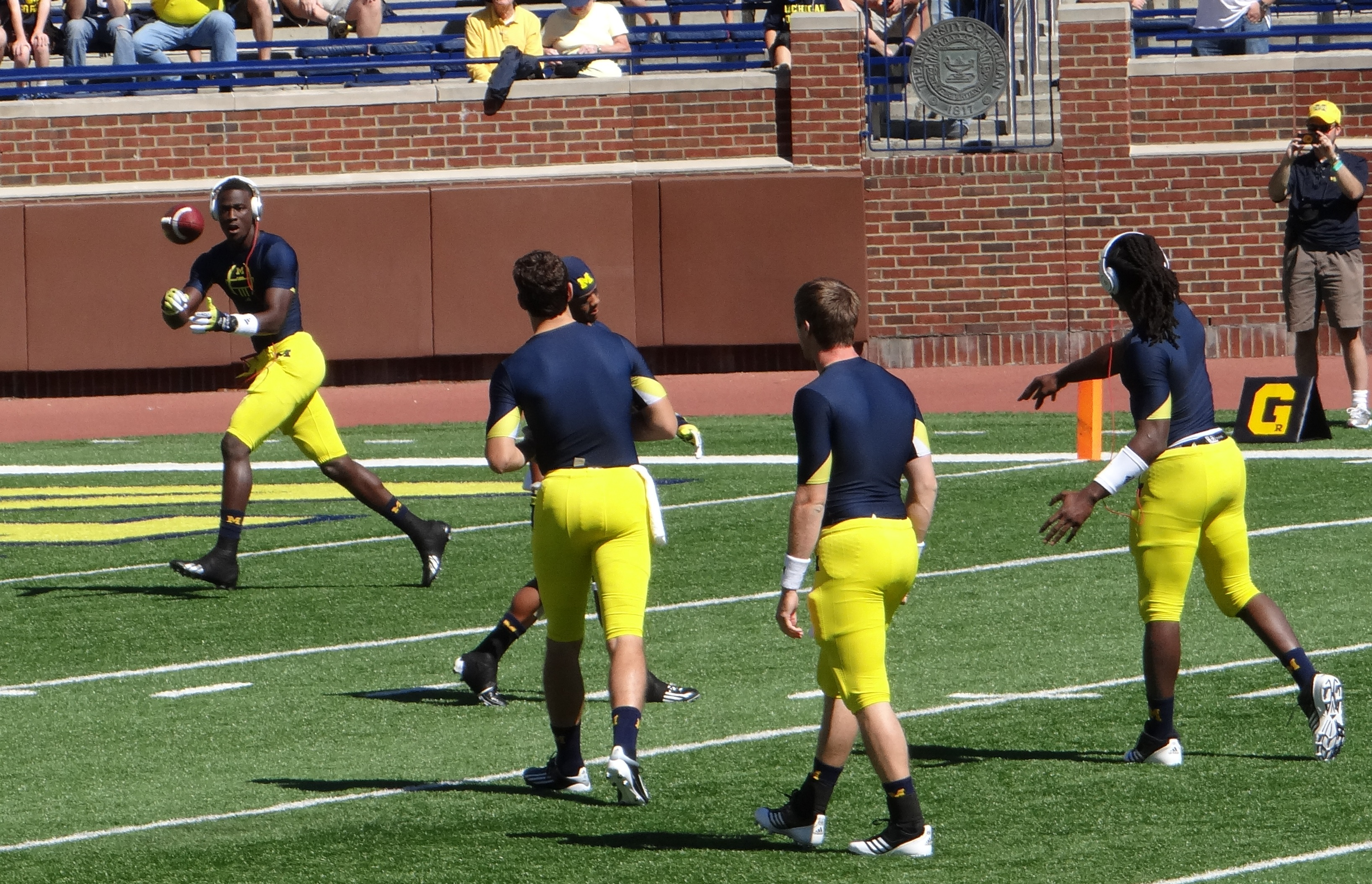
Denard Robinson passing to Gardner.

In Gardner's third season, he was converted to wide receiver. Through the first four games of the season, he was the team's leading receiver with 11 receptions for 195 yards and three touchdowns.

Following an injury to Denard Robinson's throwing arm in the eighth game of the season against Nebraska, Gardner returned to the quarterback position. He received his first start as Michigan's quarterback against Minnesota on November 3, 2012. Gardner ran for a touchdown and completed 12 of 18 passes for 234 yards and two touchdowns as Michigan defeated the Golden Gophers, 35–13. Four of the touchdown drives were longer than 75 yards.

In his second start at quarterback, Gardner led Michigan to a fourth-quarter comeback and a 38–31 overtime victory against Northwestern. He ran for 47 yards and two touchdowns and completed 16 of 29 passes for 286 yards and two touchdowns. With two seconds remaining in the game, Roy Roundtree caught a 53-yard pass from Gardner to set up a game-tying field goal. Gardner scored the winning touchdown in overtime on a one-yard run.

In the final home game of the 2012 season, Gardner accounted for a career-high six touchdowns in a 42–17 victory over Iowa. Gardner completed 18 of 23 passes for 314 yards and three touchdowns. He also rushed for 37 yards and scored three touchdowns. Gardner became the second quarterback in Michigan history to account for six touchdowns in a game, Steve Smith having accomplished the feat in 1981 and again in 1983.

=== 2013 season ===
Gardner was named the starting quarterback for the 2013 Michigan Wolverines football team. Through the first seven games of the 2013 season, Gardner had 1,779 passing yards, 660 rushing yards, and 22 touchdowns (13 passing, nine rushing).

In the season opener against Central Michigan, Gardner completed 10 of 15 passes for 162 yards and a touchdown, though he also threw two interceptions.

Prior to the 2013 Notre Dame game, Gardner was awarded the No. 98 Michigan Football Legends jersey in honor of Tom Harmon. He became the first player to wear the No. 98 jersey since Harmon's graduation after the 1940 season. In his first game wearing Harmon's jersey, Gardner led Michigan to a 41–30 victory over Notre Dame. Gardner completed 21 of 33 passes for 294 yards and four touchdowns while throwing one interception. Gardner contributed 376 yards of total offense against Notre Dame, eleventh best in Michigan history.

On October 19, 2013, against Indiana, Gardner broke John Navarre's Michigan single-game record with 503 passing yards. He also broke Denard Robinson's Michigan single-game record with 584 yards of total offense. Gardner and Robinson hold nine of the top ten positions on Michigan's all-time, single-game total yardage list (Jake Rudock has the other).

=== Statistics ===
			Passing							Rushing			
Season	Team	GP	Comp	Att	Comp %	Yards	Yards/Att	TD	INT	Att	Yards	Ave	TD
2010	Michigan	4	7	10	70.0	85	8.5	1	0	7	21	3.0	1
2011	Michigan	9	11	23	47.8	176	7.7	1	1	25	53	2.1	1
2012	Michigan	13	75	126	59.5	1,219	9.7	11	5	47	101	2.1	7
2013	Michigan	12	208	345	60.3	2,960	8.6	21	11	165	483	2.9	11
2014	Michigan	12	174	283	61.5	1,896	6.7	10	15	98	258	2.6	4
Career		50	475	787	60.4	6,336	8.05	44	32	342	916	2.7	24

== Professional career ==
Pre-draft measurables
Height	Weight	Arm length	Hand span	Wingspan	40-yard dash	10-yard split	20-yard split	20-yard shuttle	Three-cone drill	Vertical jump	Broad jump	Bench press
6 ft 3 1/2 in (1.92 m)	218 lb (99 kg)	33 1/8 in (0.84 m)	9 1/2 in (0.24 m)	6 ft 7 1/2 in (2.02 m)	4.65 s	1.58 s	2.65 s	4.42 s	6.96 s	35.5 in (0.90 m)	9 ft 9 in (2.97 m)	15 reps
All values from Pro Day

=== New England Patriots ===
After going undrafted in the 2015 NFL draft, Gardner agreed to a contract with the New England Patriots.

Gardner was released by the Patriots on May 18, 2015.

=== Pittsburgh Steelers ===
Gardner was claimed off waivers by the Pittsburgh Steelers on May 19, 2015. The Steelers practiced with Gardner as a quarterback instead of wide receiver. He did not make the team, and was released on August 17, 2015.

=== Nojima Sagamihara Rise ===
Gardner played for the Nojima Sagamihara Rise of Japan's X-League. The Rise would finish the season third in the Central division missing out on a playoff berth. Gardner however finished the season passing for 1,746 yards with 12 touchdowns and nine interceptions. He also had eight rushing touchdowns on 70 carries for 397 yards. For his efforts, he was awarded the 2016 X-League Rookie of the Year award.

=== Saskatchewan Roughriders ===
Gardner was signed by the Saskatchewan Roughriders of the Canadian Football League (CFL) on June 27, 2018. He was released by the team on August 15, 2018.

== Media career ==
In September 2019 it was announced that Gardner had joined Bally Sports Detroit to be part of their High School Football coverage. He also provides regional color commentary for Fox Sports 1's college football coverage.

== Personal ==
Gardner appeared in the Faces in the Crowd section of the November 16, 2009 issue of Sports Illustrated. He holds a Bachelor of Arts from the University of Michigan College of Literature, Science, and the Arts in Afro-American and African studies and is enrolled in the university's Master of Social Work Program.

== See also ==
- Michigan Wolverines football statistical leaders
