= 2014 Chicago Bears season =

95th season in franchise history

- Owner: The McCaskey Family
- General manager: Phil Emery
- Head coach: Marc Trestman
- Home stadium: Soldier Field

Results
- Record: 5–11
- Division place: 4th NFC North
- Playoffs: Did not qualify
- All-Pros: G Kyle Long
- Pro Bowlers: TE Martellus Bennett; G Kyle Long

Uniform
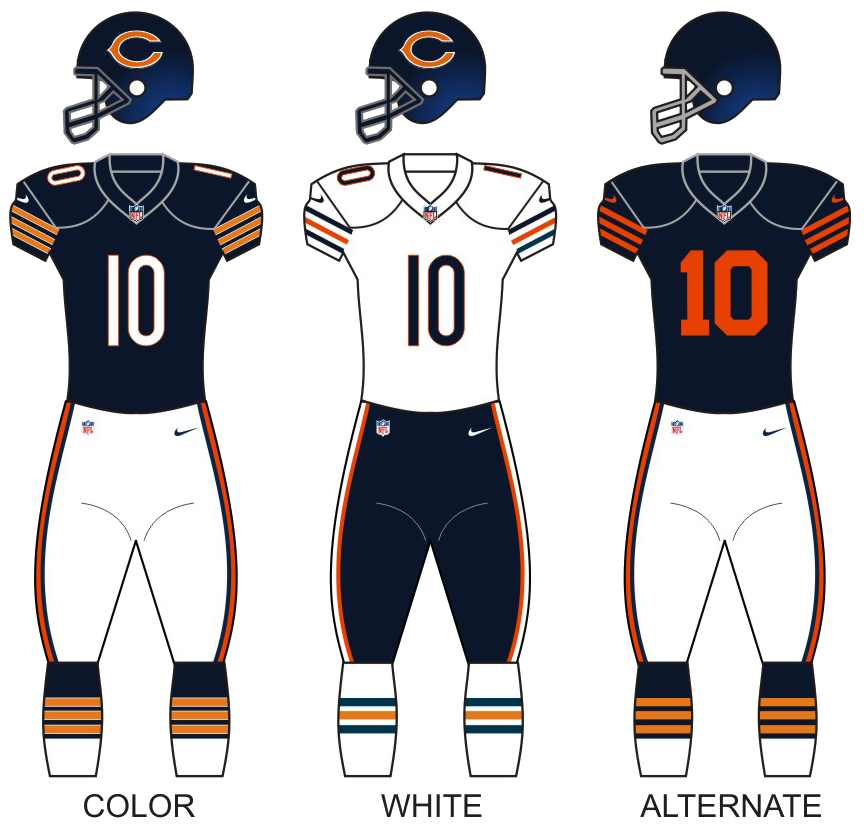

The 2014 season was the Chicago Bears' 95th in the National Football League (NFL), and their second and final season under head coach Marc Trestman. The Bears failed to qualify for the playoffs after being eliminated from contention in week 14, their fourth consecutive season without making the postseason.

The Bears entered 2014 with hopes of improving their 8–8 record in 2013. After losing the season opener to the Buffalo Bills, the Bears won their next two games. However, this would be the only week of 2014 that the Bears had a winning record, as they fell to 3–5 upon reaching the bye week. The Bears lost three of those games by more than one touchdown, and allowed more than 50 points in consecutive games against the New England Patriots and Green Bay Packers. The Bears won two straight games after the loss to the Packers, but ended the season with five consecutive losses, all but two (in the second games against the Detroit Lions and Minnesota Vikings) by more than two scores. The Bears ended the season 5–11, their first losing season since 2009 and first season with more than ten losses since 2004.

General manager Phil Emery was fired on December 29, and Trestman was fired later in the day.

== Offseason ==
=== Organizational changes ===
After the defense set franchise worsts in points (478), total yards (6,313) and rushing yards (2,583) allowed, defensive line coach Mike Phair and linebackers coach Tim Tibesar were fired by the team on January 12. Head coach Marc Trestman stated, "We need to improve in all areas defensively and that will be a focal point for us this offseason. The process starts with me as the head coach. Our search for a defensive line and linebackers coach has begun and we will be looking for the best candidates whose experience can bring the most out of our veteran and young players in both areas." On January 22, Houston Texans linebacker coach Reggie Herring was hired to take Tibesar's place, while former Dallas Cowboys defensive coordinator and Connecticut Huskies head coach Paul Pasqualoni became the defensive line coach. On January 25, assistant defensive line coach Michael Sinclair was replaced by Louisville defensive line coach Clint Hurtt. On February 12, assistant offensive line coach Pat Meyer was promoted to offensive line, while martial artist Joe Kim was hired as assistant strength/skill development coach.

On February 7, assistant head athletic trainer/director of rehabilitation Bobby Slater joined the Tampa Bay Buccaneers after 15 years of service with the Bears.

=== Roster changes ===
Position	Player	Free agency tag	Date signed	2014 team
QB	Jay Cutler	UFA	January 2	Chicago Bears
QB	Josh McCown	UFA	March 12	Tampa Bay Buccaneers
QB	Jordan Palmer	UFA	March 9	Chicago Bears
C	Roberto Garza	UFA	February 27	Chicago Bears
OG	Matt Slauson	UFA	January 2	Chicago Bears
OG	Taylor Boggs	ERFA	February 24	Chicago Bears
OT	Eben Britton	UFA	April 3	Chicago Bears
OT	Jonathan Scott	UFA	–	–
TE	Dante Rosario	UFA	February 27	Chicago Bears
DT	Henry Melton	UFA	March 18	Dallas Cowboys
DT	Landon Cohen	UFA	–	–
DT	Nate Collins	UFA	March 9	Chicago Bears
DT	Jeremiah Ratliff	UFA	March 5	Chicago Bears
DE	Corey Wootton	UFA	March 20	Minnesota Vikings
DE	Cheta Ozougwu	ERFA	May 18	New Orleans Saints
LB	James Anderson	UFA	June 4	New England Patriots
LB	D. J. Williams	UFA	March 11	Chicago Bears
LB	Blake Costanzo	UFA	June 3	San Francisco 49ers
CB	Charles Tillman	UFA	March 14	Chicago Bears
CB	Tim Jennings	UFA	January 2	Chicago Bears
CB	Zack Bowman	UFA	March 31	New York Giants
CB	Kelvin Hayden	UFA	February 28	Chicago Bears
CB	Derrick Martin	UFA	February 24	Chicago Bears
CB	Sherrick McManis	UFA	March 19	Chicago Bears
S	Major Wright	UFA	April 4	Tampa Bay Buccaneers
S	Craig Steltz	UFA	March 18	Chicago Bears
S	Anthony Walters	RFA	May 14	Arizona Cardinals
ST	Devin Hester	UFA	March 20	Atlanta Falcons
ST	Patrick Mannelly	UFA	June 20	Retired
RFA: Restricted free agent, UFA: Unrestricted free agent, ERFA: Exclusive rights free agent

The Bears enter the offseason with 27 players set to become free agents, 17 of whom are on defense, with safety Anthony Walters being a restricted free agent, while guard Taylor Boggs and defensive lineman Cheta Ozougwu are exclusive rights free agents. CBS Sports writer Joel Corry projected the Bears' salary cap to be $41,632,799, with an adjusted cap of $128,013,800, which ranked fourth in the league, behind the Cleveland Browns, Jacksonville Jaguars and Oakland Raiders. By February 22, the Bears' salary cap was approximately $2.7 million.

==== Acquisitions ====
The first acquisition of 2014 occurred on February 17, when defensive end Austen Lane was signed. The following day, cornerback Derricus Purdy was signed. On March 6, the Bears signed defensive end Trevor Scott. On March 11, the first day of free agency, the Bears signed defensive lineman Lamarr Houston, safety Ryan Mundy and linebacker Jordan Senn. On March 12, the Bears signed cornerback M. D. Jennings. On March 13, defensive end and wide receiver Willie Young and Domenik Hixon, respectively, were signed. Five days later, former Bears defensive end Israel Idonije and safety Danny McCray were signed. On March 26, the Bears signed Minnesota Vikings star defensive end Jared Allen. On April 6, center Brian de la Puente was signed. The following day, Chicago signed former Canadian Football League long snapper Chad Rempel. Washington Redskins receiver Josh Bellamy was acquired via waivers by the Bears, and tight end Matt Mulligan was signed, both on April 8. Thirteen days later, wide receiver Josh Morgan was signed, followed by running back Shaun Draughn three days after. On June 3, receivers Armanti Edwards and Micheal Spurlock were signed, and two weeks later, Chicago signed quarterback Jimmy Clausen. On June 19, defensive lineman Jamil Merrell and linebacker Conor O'Neill, both being undrafted free agents, were signed. Four days later, five-time Pro Bowl safety Adrian Wilson and tight end Jeron Mastrud were acquired, and were the final acquisitions by the Bears prior to Training Camp.

==== Departures ====
On March 5, the first departure of the year was punter Adam Podlesh. Five days later, running back Michael Bush was waived. Eleven days after signing, tight end Dante Rosario was released on March 10. On March 11, defensive end Julius Peppers was released after the Bears were unable to trade him. He later signed a deal with the Green Bay Packers. On March 18, receiver Earl Bennett was waived after refusing to have his salary reduced. On April 15, the Bears released defensive end Cheta Ozougwu. On June 3, linebacker Tana Patrick was waived. On June 19, quarterback Jerrod Johnson, tight end Fendi Onobun, defensive lineman Israel Idonije and safety Sean Cattouse were waived.

On March 12, unrestricted free agent quarterback Josh McCown signed a deal with the Tampa Bay Buccaneers. Six days later, defensive end Henry Melton joined the Dallas Cowboys. On March 20, special teamer Devin Hester and defensive lineman Corey Wootton were signed by the Atlanta Falcons and Vikings, respectively. Cornerback Zack Bowman joined the New York Giants on March 31. On April 4, safety Major Wright was signed by Tampa Bay. In May, Anthony Walters signed with the Arizona Cardinals and Ozougwu joined the New Orleans Saints on May 14 and 18, respectively. From June 3–4, linebacker Blake Costanzo was signed by the San Francisco 49ers, followed by James Anderson with the New England Patriots. On June 20, long snapper Patrick Mannelly retired after 16 seasons in the NFL, all with the Bears.

=== 2014 draft class ===
The Bears did not receive any compensatory picks for the draft. Profootballtalk.com's Michael David Smith wrote Chicago needed to draft players at four positions for the first round: defensive back, with first-round possibilities including Ha Ha Clinton-Dix and Justin Gilbert; linebacker, such as C. J. Mosley and Ryan Shazier; defensive tackle, like Aaron Donald. Additionally, Smith wrote the Bears could target a running back or quarterback with mid- to late-round draft picks, such as De'Anthony Thomas and James White, and Tom Savage, respectively.

With the 14th pick in the draft, the Bears selected Virginia Tech cornerback Kyle Fuller, who recorded 173 tackles, 4.5 sacks, six interceptions and 21 deflections during his college career. In round two, with the 51st pick, LSU defensive lineman Ego Ferguson was drafted; Ferguson had started only one full season in 2013, recording a sack, but had his season end due to an injury, which had prevented him from participating in the NFL Scouting Combine. In the following round, Chicago drafted defensive tackle Will Sutton of Arizona State with the 82nd pick; Sutton recorded 20.5 sacks in his college career, while leading the Pac-12 Conference with 10.5 sacks and 20 tackles for loss in 2012. The Bears held two fourth-rounders: the 117 and 131, the latter being acquired after a trade with the Denver Broncos. The former was used on Arizona running back Ka'Deem Carey, the school's career-leading rusher, and was considered as the best running back available by numerous experts. The 131st pick was used on Minnesota safety Brock Vereen. As a result of the trade with Denver, the Bears did not have a fifth-rounder. In the sixth round, with the 183rd pick, San Jose State quarterback David Fales was drafted, who holds every passing record in school history. The next round, with the 191st pick, Miami punter Pat O'Donnell was drafted; O'Donnell led the Atlantic Coast Conference and ranked second in the nation in punting average with 47.1 yards. The Bears' final pick, the 191st pick in the seventh round, was Boise State offensive lineman Charles Leno, who started 36 consecutive games since 2011.

Analysts gave above average grades for the draft class. James Neveau of WMAQ-TV graded the offensive selections as an "A", considering Carey as the "best value pick" by the Bears. On defense and special teams, Neveau gave the picks a "B+", praising Sutton's selection, but doubted the decision to take Ferguson in the second round. NFL.com's Bucky Brooks wrote Carey was the biggest steal of the draft among NFC North draft picks, ultimately giving the Bears' class a "B". Foxsports.com, who gave the Bears a "B", praised Carey, while stating that despite playing well in 2012, Sutton had been too heavy in 2013, and must be "at the right playing weight in 2014 to make a difference in the big leagues". Chris Burke and Doug Farrar of Sports Illustrated considered the Sutton and Carey selections as "a win for the team's Southwest area scout"; the two gave the class an "A−". ESPN analyst Mel Kiper Jr. awarded the class a "B", believing the team performed well in focusing on team needs, and stating he is fine with Fuller's selection, as Gilbert is not "superior to Fuller", though Clinton-Dix would've been a good selection; Todd McShay, another ESPN analyst, considered Vereen as the best NFC North selection.

All eight rookies were signed to four-year deals. Two days after the draft, on May 12, Vereen and Fales were signed. Ferguson, Carey, Fales, O'Donnell, and Leno were signed the following day, followed by Fuller the next day, and concluded with Sutton on May 15. The Bears were the first team to sign a draftee in 2014, and the first to complete signing their class.

After the draft, the Bears signed nine undrafted free agents: quarterback Jordan Lynch of Northern Illinois, who was listed as a running back; defensive tackles Brandon Dunn (Louisville) and Lee Pegues (East Carolina); guards Ryan Groy (Wisconsin) and James Dunbar (TCU); tackle Cody Booth (Temple); and linebackers Tana Patrick (Alabama), Christian Jones (Florida State) and Devekeyan Lattimore (USF).

**2014 Chicago Bears draft**
Round	Pick	Player	Position	College	Notes
1	14	Kyle Fuller *	Cornerback	Virginia Tech	
2	51	Ego Ferguson	Defensive tackle	LSU	
3	82	Will Sutton	Defensive tackle	Arizona State	
4	117	Ka'Deem Carey	Running back	Arizona	
4	131	Brock Vereen	Safety	Minnesota	from Denver
6	183	David Fales	Quarterback	San Jose State	
6	191	Pat O'Donnell	Punter	Miami	
7	246	Charles Leno *	Offensive tackle	Boise State	from Denver
Made roster † Pro Football Hall of Fame * Made at least one Pro Bowl during career

Notes

- The Bears acquired an additional sixth-round selection (No. 183 overall) in a trade that sent offensive tackle Gabe Carimi to the Tampa Bay Buccaneers.
- The Bears traded their seventh-round selection (No. 229 overall) to the Dallas Cowboys in exchange for tight end Dante Rosario.
- The Denver Broncos traded their fourth-round selection (No. 131 overall) and their seventh-round selection (No. 246 overall) to Chicago in exchange for Chicago's fifth-round selection (No. 156 overall) and 2015 fifth-round selection.

=== Offseason activities ===
The Bears began their offseason program on April 22, with a mandatory minicamp ending the program from June 17–19.

==== Rookie minicamp ====
The Bears began rookie minicamp on May 16, which lasted for three days, in the Walter Payton Center. Asides from the eight drafted rookies, the undrafted rookies signed after the draft, and 2013 rookies, 38 players were present for tryouts, including four Illinois-born players. At the end of the camp, punter Drew Butler was waived, while tryout players Senorise Perry, a running back from Louisville, and North Texas safety Marcus Trice were signed.

Chicago Bears 2014 Rookie minicamp roster
**Quarterbacks**: 12 **David Fales**; 4 **Jerrod Johnson**; 14 Adam Kennedy; **Running backs**: 25 **Ka'Deem Carey**; 35 Willie Carter; 36 Jordan Lynch; 27 Senorise Perry; **Wide receivers**: 80 Connor Dietz; 81 Darryle Hawkins; 82 Derrick Foster; 87 Torrance Hunt; 11 Rashard Smith; 13 Don Shumpert; 88 Diontae Spencer	**Tight ends**: 84 Andre McDonald; 86 Dustin Greenwell; **Offensive linemen**: 60 Larry Banks G; 73 Cody Booth T; 59 Kasen Carlson C; 70 **Rogers Gaines** T; 53 Ryan Groy G; 72 **Charles Leno** T; 79 **Joe Long** T; 58 F. N. Lutz C; 76 Richie Rebbman T; **Defensive linemen**: 70 Francis Bah DT; 79 Brandon Dunn DT; 95 **Ego Ferguson** DT; 78 Jesse Joseph DE; 91 Jamie Merrill DE; 78 Lee Pegues DT; 72 **Tracy Robertson** DE; 71 Brandon Sparrow DT; 93 **Will Sutton** DT; 98 Calvin Washington DE; 97 Anthony Wells DE; 92 Cameron Whigham DE	**Linebackers**: 62 Keenan Graham; 96 Christian Jones; 60 DeDe Lattimore; 52 Conor O'Neill; 64 Tana Patrick; 59 Doug Rigg; 49 **Lawrence Wilson**; **Defensive backs**: 32 Ciante Evans DB; 23 **Kyle Fuller** CB; 37 Greg Heban CB; 38 Larry King S; 36 Al Louis-Jean; 44 Derricus Purdy CB; 31 Kyle Sebetic DB; 27 Abdul Smith S; 24 Marcus Trice CB; 45 **Brock Vereen** S; 43 Anthony Watkins S	**Special teams**: 18 Tyler Campbell P; 8 Mitch Ewald K; 48 **Brandon Hartson** LS; 57 Craig Montgomery LS; 16 **Pat O'Donnell** P; 46 **Chad Rempel** LS; 1 **Tress Way** P; **Veterans in both italics and bold** **Drafted players in bold** Undrafted signees in italics 62 total, 8 drafted, 15 signed, 23 unsigned

==== Training Camp ====
Training Camp at Olivet Nazarene University in Bourbonnais, Illinois began on July 24, with the first practice the following day. The first two practices were held without pads; additional practices were held from July 27–28, and from July 30–August 1.

Kyle Long missed the seven practices due to a viral infection. Chris Conte and Craig Steltz did not participate on the first day due to a shoulder and groin injury, respectively; both were later placed on the active physically-unable-to-perform (PUP) list. The second day's practice featured Tim Jennings and Willie Young having quadriceps injuries, the latter participating, but leaving prior to the end. The next day, Jennings and Young returned, but the former left after the first play. Terrence Toliver didn't play due to a toe injury. Alshon Jeffery, Toliver, Conte, and Steltz skipped July 28 practice, Jeffery due to a sore foot. After a day off on July 29, Jeffery returned, while Jennings participated in individual drills. During the day, Eben Britton suffered a torn hamstring during a one-on-one drill with Jeremiah Ratliff. Despite being cleared to return, Long did not practice until Family Fest. Roberto Garza skipped the August 1 practice for "personal reasons".

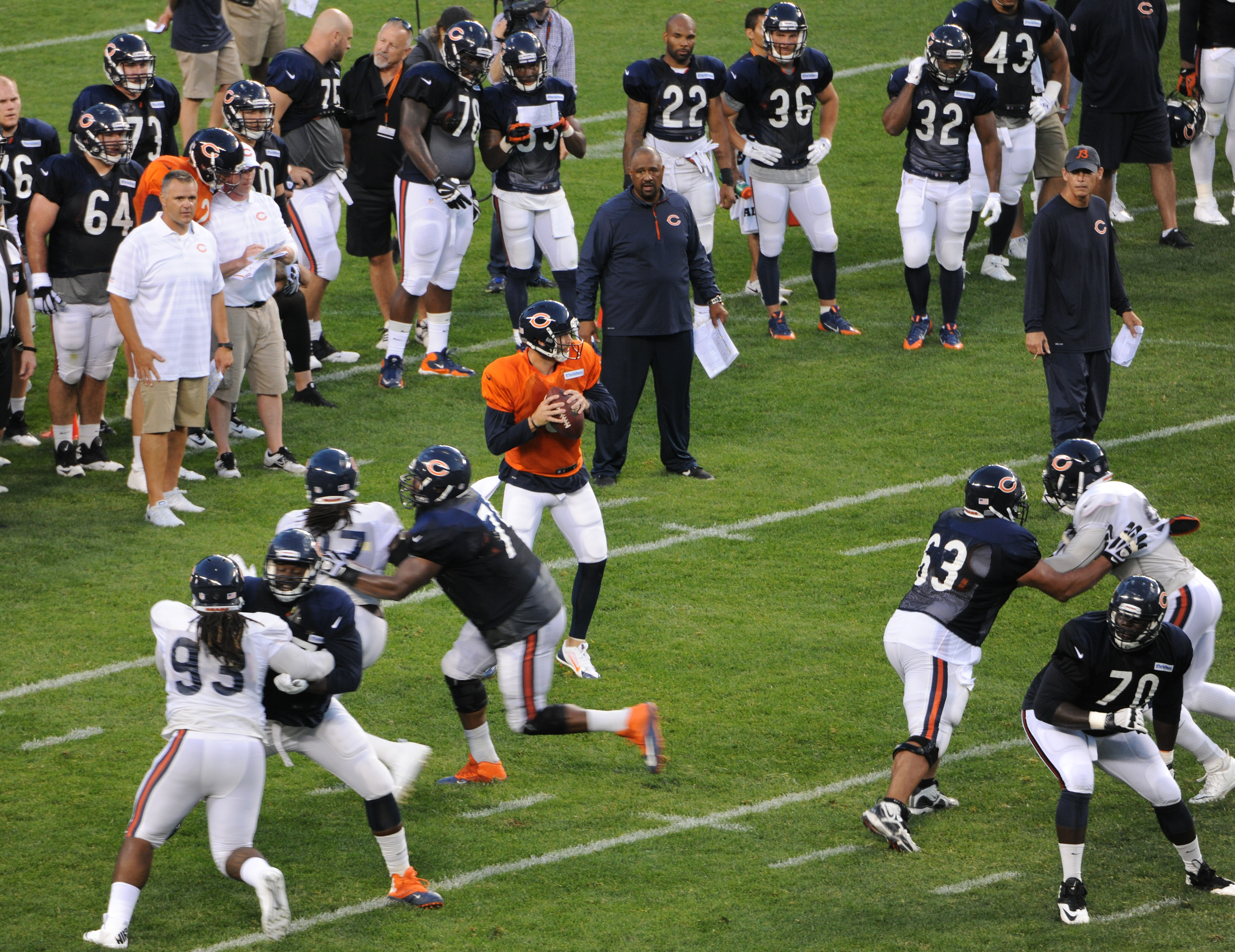
Jay Cutler prepares to pass during the Family Fest at Soldier Field

The annual Family Fest at Soldier Field was held on August 2 in front of 27,000 spectators. Long made his return at the event, along with Garza, while Shaun Draughn was not present for personal issues. Jared Allen and Ratliff were excused. Later practices were held in Bourbonnais from August 4–6, with the first preseason game on the following day. On August 4, Jeffery, Britton, Conte, Steltz, and Draughn did not practice, while Lance Briggs bruised a knee; the first major injury of Training Camp was Marquess Wilson's broken clavicle. During the session, a fight between Martellus Bennett and Kyle Fuller occurred: while attempting to force Bennett to fumble, Fuller grabbed Bennett's shoulder pad, pulling him down. In retaliation, Bennett body-slammed Fuller, causing Lamarr Houston, Matt Forte and Zach Miller, along with offensive coordinator Aaron Kromer to intervene. Head coach Marc Trestman would end the practice earlier than scheduled. The next day, Bennett was indefinitely suspended by the team. August 5's practice featured Britton, Briggs, Allen, and Draughn being absent, while Jordan Mills injured his foot prior to the end of the workout. On August 6, Long, Isaiah Frey, Mills, Britton, Jennings, Steltz, Conte, and Allen did not practice. The final practices would be held from August 10 to 12. Bennett was reinstated and practiced on August 10, while Steltz and Conte returned to practice. However, Mills, Britton, Chris Williams, Frey, and Brian de la Puente did not practice. The five, Wilson, and Briggs did not work out the next day, with Briggs being given a day off. August 12's practice had Williams, Britton, Mills, Wilson, Frey, Dante Rosario, Tillman, and Ratliff out.

On July 25, offensive lineman Dylan Gandy was signed, while Jamil Merrell was waived. James Dunbar was released two days later. On July 29, receiver Dale Moss was signed. Two days later, Toliver was released via an injury settlement, while offensive linemen Graham Pocic and Dennis Roland were signed. On August 6, Greg Herd was signed, while Conor O'Neil was released.

== Staff ==
2014 Chicago Bears staff
Front office: Secretary of the board of directors – Virginia Halas McCaskey; Chairman – George McCaskey; President/CEO – Ted Phillips; General manager – Phil Emery; Vice president of football administration/general counsel – Cliff Stein; Director of pro personnel – Kevin Turks; Assistant director of pro personnel – Dwayne Joseph; Director of college scouting – Marty Barrett; Head coaches: Head coach – Marc Trestman; Assistant head coach/special teams coordinator – Joe DeCamillis; Offensive coaches: Offensive coordinator – Aaron Kromer; Quarterbacks – Matt Cavanaugh; Running backs – Skip Peete; Wide receivers – Mike Groh; Tight ends – Andy Bischoff; Offensive line – Pat Meyer; Offensive quality control – Brendan Nugent; Offensive quality control – Carson Walch	Defensive coaches: Defensive coordinator – Mel Tucker; Defensive line – Paul Pasqualoni; Assistant defensive line – Clint Hurtt; Linebackers – Reggie Herring; Defensive backs – Jon Hoke; Defensive quality control – Chris Harris; Defensive quality control – Sean Desai; Special teams coaches: Assistant special teams – Dwayne Stukes; Strength and conditioning: Strength and conditioning – Mike Clark; Strength and conditioning assistant – Jim Arthur; Strength assistant/skill development coach – Joe Kim; Conditioning assistant – Phil Brauch

== Final roster ==
2014 Chicago Bears roster
Quarterbacks (QB): 6 Jay Cutler; 8 Jimmy Clausen; 12 David Fales; Running backs (RB): 25 Ka'Deem Carey; 22 Matt Forte; 32 Senorise Perry; 24 Montell Owens FB; Wide receivers (WR): 11 Josh Bellamy; 17 Alshon Jeffery; 80 Marc Mariani RS; 19 Josh Morgan; 10 Marquess Wilson; Tight ends (TE): 84 Blake Annen; 83 Martellus Bennett; 88 Dante Rosario	Offensive linemen (OL): 74 Jermon Bushrod T; 63 Roberto Garza C; 79 Ryan Groy G; 72 Charles Leno T; 75 Kyle Long G; 67 Jordan Mills T; 70 Michael Ola G/T; Defensive linemen (DL): 69 Jared Allen DE; 91 David Bass DE; 98 Brandon Dunn DT; 95 Ego Ferguson DT; 92 Stephen Paea DT; 90 Jeremiah Ratliff DT; 76 Trevor Scott DE; 73 Austen Lane DE; 93 Will Sutton DT; 94 Cornelius Washington DE	Linebackers (LB): 57 Jon Bostic; 52 Khaseem Greene OLB; 59 Christian Jones OLB; 96 DeDe Lattimore OLB; 50 Shea McClellin OLB; Defensive backs (DB): 47 Chris Conte FS; 23 Kyle Fuller CB; 30 Demontre Hurst CB; 26 Tim Jennings CB; 39 Al Louis-Jean CB; 29 Danny McCray SS; 27 Sherrick McManis CB; 20 Terrance Mitchell CB; 21 Ryan Mundy SS; 45 Brock Vereen FS; 49 Anthony Walters FS; Special teams (ST): 4 Jay Feely K; 9 Robbie Gould K; 16 Pat O'Donnell P; 44 Jeremy Cain LS	Practice squad: 71 Conor Boffeli G; 60 Taylor Boggs C; 81 B. J. Cunningham WR; 85 Jacob Maxwell TE; 78 Antoine McClain G; 48 Jonathan Brown LB; 35 Shamiel Gary S; 18 Rashad Lawrence WR; 60 Jamil Merrell DE; 73 Jason Weaver T; Reserve: 55 Lance Briggs OLB (IR); 62 Eben Britton (IR); 99 Lamarr Houston DE (IR); 86 Zach Miller TE (IR); 68 Matt Slauson G (IR); 33 Charles Tillman CB (IR); 15 Brandon Marshall WR (IR); 64 Brian de la Puente C/G (IR); 53 Darryl Sharpton MLB (IR); 58 D. J. Williams MLB (IR); 97 Willie Young DE (IR); Rookies in italics 52 active, 11 reserve, 10 practice squad

== Preseason ==
=== Transactions ===
Preseason roster changes

Additions

- On August 15, the Bears signed Kofi Hughes.
- On August 16, the Bears signed Santonio Holmes.
- On August 18, the Bears signed Darius Reynaud and Peyton Thompson.
- On September 1, the Bears signed Jeremy Cain.
- On September 2, the Bears signed Kelvin Hayden.

Departures

- On August 16, the Bears released Eric Weems.
- On August 18, the Bears released Chad Rempel and Tress Way.
- On August 24, the Bears released Jordan Palmer, Adrian Wilson, Nate Collins, Michael Ford, Derricus Purdy, Peyton Thompson, Dylan Gandy, Joe Long, Greg Herd, Kofi Hughes, Darius Reynaud, and Jordan Senn.
- On August 25, the Bears released Craig Steltz.
- On August 26, the Bears released James Brown and Isaiah Frey.
- On August 29, the Bears released Jordan Lynch, Armanti Edwards, Jeron Mastrud, Dennis Roland, and Rob Turner.
- On August 30, the Bears released Kelvin Hayden, Eben Britton, Chris Williams, Josh Bellamy, Dale Moss, Taylor Boggs, Brandon Dunn, Lee Pegues, Tracy Robertson, Jerry Franklin, DeDe Lattimore, Ryan Groy, Al Louis-Jean, C. J. Wilson, Austen Lane, and M. D. Jennings.
- On August 31, the Bears released Brandon Hartson.

Reserve lists

- On August 15, the Bears placed Zach Miller on injured reserve.
- On September 2, the Bears placed Marquess Wilson on injured reserve/recall.

Practice squad additions

- On September 1, the Bears added Josh Bellamy, Taylor Boggs, Brandon Dunn, Isaiah Frey, Ryan Groy, DeDe Lattimore, Al Louis-Jean, Terrance Mitchell, Roy Philon, and Rashad Ross to the practice squad.

=== Schedule ===
The Bears' preseason opponents were announced on April 9, 2014. The Bears began the preseason at home against the Philadelphia Eagles, who had hampered the Bears' playoff chances in 2013 after a 54–11 win. The next two games would be away games against the Jacksonville Jaguars on ESPN, followed by the defending Super Bowl champion Seattle Seahawks. The Bears would end the preseason against frequent opponent Cleveland Browns, marking the eleventh consecutive preseason closer between the two teams.

Week	Date	Opponent	Result	Record	Game site	GameBook	NFL.com recap
1	August 8	Philadelphia Eagles	W 34–28	1–0	Soldier Field	GameBook	Recap
2	August 14	Jacksonville Jaguars	W 20–19	2–0	Soldier Field	GameBook	Recap
3	August 22	at Seattle Seahawks	L 6–34	2–1	CenturyLink Field	GameBook	Recap
4	August 28	at Cleveland Browns	L 13–33	2–2	FirstEnergy Stadium	GameBook	Recap

=== Game summaries ===
In the preseason opener against the Eagles, Craig Steltz, Tim Jennings, Isaiah Frey, Chris Conte, Eben Britton, Jordan Mills, Jared Allen, Kyle Long, and Martellus Bennett did not participate. On the Eagles' first possession, Nick Foles was pressured by Willie Young and Lamarr Houston into having a pass intercepted by Ryan Mundy. However, Robbie Gould's 41-yard field goal was blocked by Damion Square. On Chicago's next drive, the offense traveled 69 yards, culminating in Jay Cutler's ten-yard touchdown pass to Zach Miller. Foles, who had thrown only two interceptions in 2012, would be intercepted again after his pass intended for Zach Ertz was intercepted by Sherrick McManis. In the second quarter, Matthew Tucker's 4-yard and 1-yard touchdown runs gave the Eagles the 14–7 lead. Jordan Palmer threw a 12-yard touchdown pass to Miller, but Josh Huff would return the following kickoff 102 yards for a touchdown to end the first half with the Eagles leading 21–14. In the third quarter, Khaseem Greene forced Tucker to fumble, with the Bears scoring on Gould's 26-yard field goal. Matt Barkley then threw a 14-yard touchdown pass to David Fluellen to increase the lead to 28–17, but the margin would be shortened with Jimmy Clausen's 73-yard touchdown pass to Chris Williams; the Bears would fail to score on the two-point conversion after Clausen's pass was batted. Chicago would claim the lead after Clausen's 22-yard touchdown pass to Micheal Spurlock, followed by Dante Rosario scoring on the two-point conversion to make the score 31–28. In the fourth quarter, David Fales threw a 41-yard pass to Josh Bellamy, but the drive ended after his pass for Bellamy was intercepted by Jaylen Watkins. The Bears would begin rushing to spend time, going 73 yards before Gould kicked a 25-yard field goal, the final points of the game.

Against Jacksonville, Marquess Wilson, Steltz, Isaiah Frey, Conte, Britton, Brian de la Puente, Mills, Williams, Rosario and Young were scratched from the game-day roster. The Jaguars scored first, off Josh Scobee's two field goals of 49 and 25 yards. On the latter play's ensuing kickoff, Eric Weems fumbled, and the ball was recovered by Will Blackmon; Jacksonville would capitalize on the recovery, with Chad Henne's six-yard touchdown pass to Marqise Lee. In the second quarter, the Bears scored their first points of the game with Cutler's four-yard touchdown pass to Brandon Marshall. Scobee would kick a 43-yard field goal, the last score of the half. The Bears' first drive of the second half ended with Clausen being intercepted by Josh Evans. Jacksonville would convert the takeaway into Kasey Redfern's 29-yard field goal, the lone score of the third quarter. On Chicago's first drive of the fourth quarter, Ka'Deem Carey scored on a one-yard run. With 50 seconds left in the game, Senorise Perry scored on a five-yard run, but failed the two-point conversion, making the score 20–19. With 27 seconds remaining, C. J. Wilson intercepted Stephen Morris to clinch the victory.

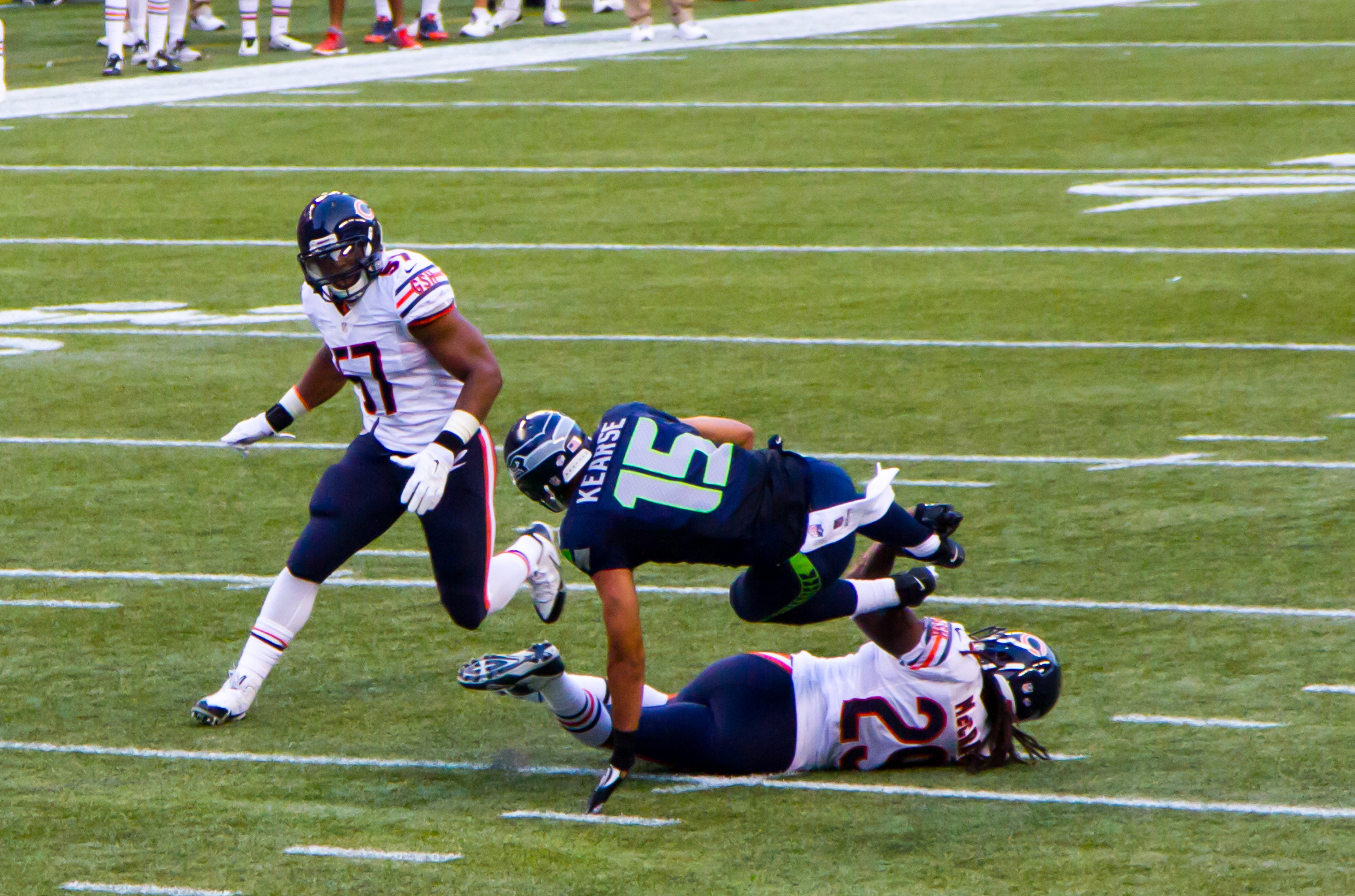
Jon Bostic and Danny McCray tackle Seahawk Jermaine Kearse

Wilson, Kyle Fuller, Frey, Britton, de la Puente, Mills, Allen, and Williams were inactive in Seattle. The Seahawks scored touchdowns on their first four drives: Marshawn Lynch and Russell Wilson's seven-yard touchdown runs in the first quarter and Wilson's touchdown passes to Jermaine Kearse and Christine Michael of seven- and 29 yards, respectively, in the second quarter. For the Bears' four first quarter drives, three ended in punts; on the team's final possession of the second quarter, Cutler's 23-yard touchdown pass to Bennett was nullified when Bennett was downed at the one-yard line. Cutler would throw a two-yard touchdown pass to Rosario, but a pass interference call on Marshall overturned the play; Cutler would be intercepted by Jeremy Lane; the Seahawks would convert the turnover into a Steven Hauschka 59-yard field goal to give the Seahawks a 31–0 lead. On Seattle's first drive of the second half, they failed to score for the first time of the game when Hauschka's 53-yard field goal hit the left upright; Gould would also miss a field goal, missing a 43-yarder wide right. Hauschka would record the only score of the third quarter, with a 38-yard field goal. In the final quarter, the Bears would reach the Seahawks' red zone, where Gould scored on a 30-yard kick. On Seattle's ensuing play, Terrelle Pryor was intercepted by C. J. Wilson, leading to a Gould 38-yard field goal to make the final score 34–6.

Visiting the Browns, the Bears sat their starters, having only 35 of 75 players participating, while the Browns kept their starters in the game. After the Bears scored on the opening drive off Gould's 39-yard field goal, the Browns took the lead off Ben Tate's one-yard touchdown run; Gould would eventually miss a 52-yarder wide right. On Cleveland's next drive, Terrance West fumbled, allowing M. D. Jennings to recover. Early in the second quarter, Fales threw a pass to Santonio Holmes, who escaped Justin Gilbert to score on the 32-yard play. The Bears scored again via Gould's 23-yard field goal, but the Browns took the 14–13 lead with Johnny Manziel's one-yard touchdown pass to Jim Dray. The Browns extended the lead on their final drive with Billy Cundiff's 22-yard field goal. On Cleveland's first drive of the third quarter, Cundiff scored on a 37-yarder, followed by 47- and 29-yard kicks to increase the margin by 13 points. In the fourth quarter, Fales would be intercepted by Robert Nelson. The Browns scored the final score of the game with Isaiah Crowell's 48-yard field goal, making the final score 33–13.

== Regular season ==
=== Transactions ===
Regular season roster changes

Additions

- On September 8, the Bears signed Ahmad Dixon.
- On September 9, the Bears signed Eben Britton.
- On September 13, the Bears promoted Josh Bellamy, Chris Williams, and Taylor Boggs to the active roster.
- On September 14, the Bears signed Tony Fiammetta.
- On September 16, the Bears promoted Isaiah Frey and Rashad Ross to the active roster.
- On September 18, the Bears signed Demontre Hurst.
- On September 25, the Bears signed Darryl Sharpton.
- On September 30, the Bears promoted Chris Williams to the active roster.
- On October 1, the Bears signed Teddy Williams.
- On October 7, the Bears promoted Al Louis-Jean to the active roster, while signing Shamiel Gary.
- On October 10, the Bears promoted DeDe Lattimore to the active roster.
- On October 11, the Bears promoted Terrell Manning to the active roster.
- On October 13, the Bears promoted Terrance Mitchell to the active roster.
- On November 8, the Bears promoted Blake Annen to the active roster.
- On November 10, the Bears promoted Ryan Groy to the active roster.
- On November 14, the Bears promoted Marquess Wilson to the active roster.
- On November 18, the Bears signed Marc Mariani.
- On November 26, the Bears promoted Brandon Dunn to the active roster.
- On November 29, the Bears signed Anthony Walters.
- On December 3, the Bears signed Jay Feely.
- On December 11, the Bears signed Montell Owens.
- On December 13, the Bears promoted David Fales to the active roster.
- On December 23, the Bears signed Austen Lane.
- On December 29, the Bears signed Conor Boffeli, Jonathan Brown, Rashad Lawrence, Jacob Maxwell, and Jason Weaver.
- On December 30, the Bears signed Jamil Merrill.

Departures

- On September 8, the Bears released Demontre Hurst.
- On September 9, the Bears released Micheal Spurlock.
- On September 12, the Bears released David Fales, Kelvin Hayden, and Tony Fiammetta.
- On September 16, the Bears released Shaun Draughn, Matthew Mulligan, and Chris Williams.
- On September 25, the Bears released Tony Fiammetta.
- On September 30, the Bears released Rashad Ross.
- On October 1, the Bears released Terrell Manning.
- On October 7, the Bears released David Bass and Isaiah Frey.
- On October 13, the Bears released Terrell Manning.
- On November 10, the Bears released Teddy Williams.
- On November 11, the Bears released Santonio Holmes.
- On November 18, the Bears released Ahmad Dixon.

Practice squad additions

- On September 9, the Bears added Greg Herd to the practice squad.
- On September 14, the Bears added David Fales to the practice squad.
- On September 17, the Bears added Chris Williams, Blake Annen, and Jordan Sullen to the practice squad.
- On October 2, the Bears added Conor Boffeli and Rashad Ross to the practice squad.
- On October 7, the Bears added DeDe Lattimore and Terrell Manning to the practice squad.
- On October 8, the Bears added David Bass to the practice squad.
- On November 3, the Bears added Jason Weaver to the practice squad.
- On November 11, the Bears added Rashad Lawrence to the practice squad.
- On November 12, the Bears added B.J. Cunningham and Antoine McClain to the practice squad.
- On November 29, the Bears added Jamil Merrill to the practice squad.
- On December 17, the Bears added Taylor Boggs to the practice squad.

Practice squad departures

- On September 9, the Bears removed Roy Philon from the practice squad.
- On October 2, the Bears removed Jordan Sullen from the practice squad.
- On October 9, the Bears removed Roy Philon and Rashad Ross from the practice squad.
- On November 11, the Bears removed Terrell Manning from the practice squad.

Reserve lists

- On September 15, the Bears placed Charles Tillman on injured reserve.
- On October 10, the Bears placed Taylor Boggs on waived/injured.
- On November 8, the Bears placed Matt Slauson on injured reserve.
- On November 26, the Bears placed Brian de la Puente on injured reserve.
- On November 28, the Bears placed Lance Briggs on injured reserve.
- On December 3, the Bears placed Chris Williams on waived/injured.
- On December 11, the Bears placed D. J. Williams on injured reserve.
- On December 13, the Bears placed Darryl Sharpton on injured reserve.
- On December 23, the Bears placed Willie Young on injured reserve.

=== Buildup ===
Michael C. Wright and Jeff Dickerson of ESPN made predictions regarding how the season goes for the Bears, believing the team will go 10–6 and 11–5, respectively.

John McMullen of The Miami Herald assigned grades for each position group but the quarterbacks entering the season, the highest being a B+ for the wide receivers and offensive line, while the lowest being a C+ for the linebackers and special teams. McMullen stated Jay Cutler's extension was "a prudent move", and while he "might not be in the Manning–Brady–Rodgers class but is on the tier below". Regarding the running backs, McMullen wrote that while Matt Forte is one of the top running backs, there is not an impressive depth behind him, while the wide receiving corps may be "the best in the business", but Marquess Wilson's injury led to a lack of depth; behind tight end Martellus Bennett, Zach Miller's injury led to Dante Rosario and Matthew Mulligan serving as backups, the former having "decent hands but just average speed", while the latter having "bounced around". The offensive line was considered the "most improved in 2013", with all five starters returning, while the defensive line has been refurbished with Jared Allen and Lamarr Houston's signings. For the linebackers, Lance Briggs and D. J. Williams would return as starters, while Shea McClellin, who had converted to linebacker, being written by McMullen as a move that "has a chance if defensive coordinator Mel Tucker lets McClellin go straight ahead as a disruptor and not expect the former Boise State star to play in space".

The Bears did not have team captains for 2014, breaking a seven-year trend. Head coach Marc Trestman stated he intended to select captains weekly.

=== Schedule ===
The schedule was announced on April 23. ESPN ranked the Bears' schedule as the 15th strongest in the league, with opponents having a combined winning percentage of .496. The Bears will open the season with six away games from weeks 2–10, due to three conflicting events in the Chicago area: week 2 is unavailable due to a NASCAR race and PGA golf tournament, week 6 due to the Chicago Marathon utilizing Soldier Field as a start/finish line, and week 9 due to a rugby union game at Soldier Field on Saturday night. To resolve the situation regarding week 9, league schedulers created a bye week for the Bears. The Bears will also play five prime time games, the most allowed by the league scheduling, and a Thanksgiving Day game during the season. In December, the Bears had three consecutive home games, the first since 2008 and the second since 1963. Although CBS, which airs AFC games against the Lions on Thanksgiving, held the rights to the game for 2014, the league's new "crossflexing" policy, which allows CBS and Fox to switch seven games, permitted the Bears to play Detroit.

Week	Date	Opponent	Result	Record	Game site	TV	GameBook	NFL.com recap
1	September 7	Buffalo Bills	**L** 20–23 (OT)	0–1	Soldier Field	Fox	Gamebook	Recap
2	September 14	at San Francisco 49ers	**W** 28–20	1–1	Levi's Stadium	NBC	Gamebook	Recap
3	September 22	at New York Jets	**W** 27–19	2–1	MetLife Stadium	ESPN	Gamebook	Recap
4	September 28	**Green Bay Packers**	**L** 17–38	2–2	Soldier Field	Fox	Gamebook	Recap
5	October 5	at Carolina Panthers	**L** 24–31	2–3	Bank of America Stadium	Fox	Gamebook	Recap
6	October 12	at Atlanta Falcons	**W** 27–13	3–3	Georgia Dome	Fox	Gamebook	Recap
7	October 19	Miami Dolphins	**L** 14–27	3–4	Soldier Field	CBS	Gamebook	Recap
8	October 26	at New England Patriots	**L** 23–51	3–5	Gillette Stadium	Fox	Gamebook	Recap
9	Bye							
10	November 9	at **Green Bay Packers**	**L** 14–55	3–6	Lambeau Field	NBC	Gamebook	Recap
11	November 16	**Minnesota Vikings**	**W** 21–13	4–6	Soldier Field	CBS	Gamebook	Recap
12	November 23	Tampa Bay Buccaneers	**W** 21–13	5–6	Soldier Field	Fox	Gamebook	Recap
13	November 27	at **Detroit Lions**	**L** 17–34	5–7	Ford Field	CBS	Gamebook	Recap
14	December 4	Dallas Cowboys	**L** 28–41	5–8	Soldier Field	NFLN	Gamebook	Recap
15	December 15	New Orleans Saints	**L** 15–31	5–9	Soldier Field	ESPN	Gamebook	Recap
16	December 21	**Detroit Lions**	**L** 14–20	5–10	Soldier Field	Fox	Gamebook	Recap
17	December 28	at **Minnesota Vikings**	**L** 9–13	5–11	TCF Bank Stadium	Fox	Gamebook	Recap
Note: Intra-division opponents are in **bold** text. Legend # Games played with color uniforms. # Games played with white uniforms. # Games played with 1940s throwback uniforms. – Light green background indicates a victory. – Light red background indicates a loss.

=== Game summaries ===
==== Week 1: vs. Buffalo Bills ====
Week One: Buffalo Bills at Chicago Bears – Game summary

Quarter	1	2	3	4	OT	Total
**Bills**	7	10	0	3	3	**23**
Bears	7	0	10	3	0	**20**

at Soldier Field, Chicago

- Date: September 7
- Game time: 12:00 p.m. CDT
- Game weather: 74 °F (23 °C), sunny
- Game attendance: 62,425
- Referee: Brad Allen
- TV announcers (Fox): Kenny Albert, Daryl Johnston and Tony Siragusa
- Recap, Gamebook

Game information

First quarter

- CHI – Martellus Bennett 12 yard pass from Jay Cutler, Robbie Gould XP good, 11:35 (CHI 7–0). **Drive: 4 plays, 66 yards, 1:55**
- BUF – E. J. Manuel 2 yard run, Dan Carpenter XP good, 6:52 (TIE 7–7). **Drive: 9 plays, 71 yards, 4:43**

Second quarter

- BUF – Dan Carpenter 50 yard field goal, 8:07 (BUF 10–7). **Drive: 6 plays, 14 yards, 3:23**
- BUF – C. J. Spiller 7 yard pass from E. J. Manuel, Dan Carpenter XP good, 5:30 (BUF 17–7). **Drive: 1 play, 7 yards, 0:06**

Third quarter

- CHI – Robbie Gould 41 yard field goal, 9:34 (BUF 17–10). **Drive: 11 plays, 57 yards, 5:26**
- CHI – Brandon Marshall 11 yard pass from Jay Cutler, Robbie Gould XP good, 2:30 (TIE 17–17). **Drive: 5 plays, 56 yards, 2:30**

Fourth quarter

- BUF – Dan Carpenter 33 yard field goal, 4:02 (BUF 20–17). **Drive: 8 plays, 37 yards, 3:50**
- CHI – Robbie Gould 37 yard field goal, 0:30 (TIE 20–20). **Drive: 12 plays, 61 yards, 3:32**

Overtime

- BUF – Dan Carpenter 27 yard field goal, 9:46 (BUF 23–20). **Drive: 7 plays, 69 yards, 3:34**

Top passers

- BUF – E. J. Manuel, 16/22, 173 yards, 1 TD, 1 INT
- CHI – Jay Cutler, 34/49, 349 yards, 2 TD, 2 INT

Top rushers

- BUF – Fred Jackson, 7 carries, 61 yards
- CHI – Matt Forté, 17 carries, 82 yards

Top receivers

- BUF – Robert Woods, 4 receptions, 78 yards
- CHI – Matt Forte, 8 receptions, 87 yards

Top tacklers

- BUF – Leodis McKelvin, 13 tackles
- CHI – Ryan Mundy, 6 tackles

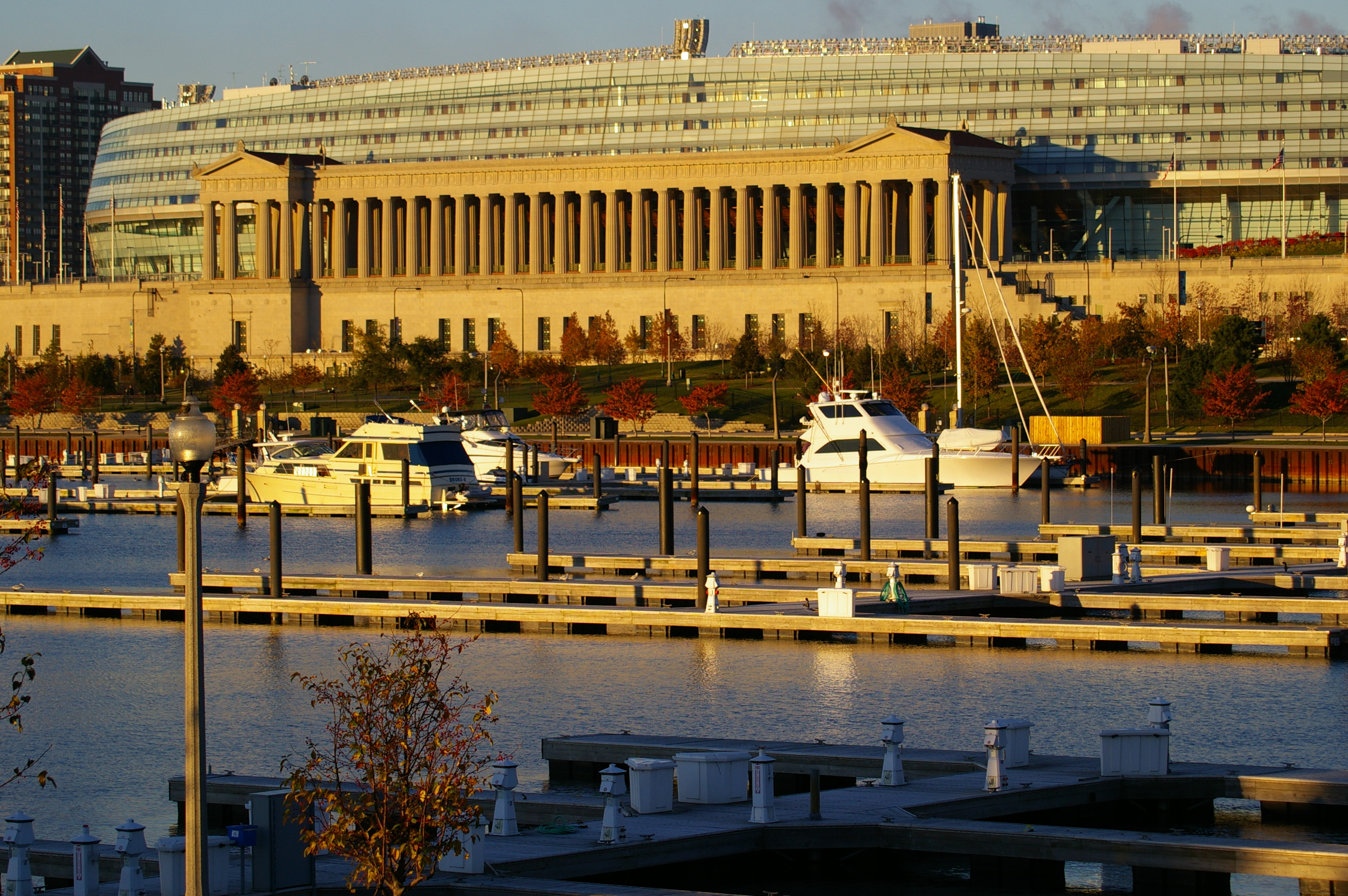
The Bears played all of their home games at Soldier Field

The Bears opened the season at home against the Buffalo Bills, who had a record of 6–10 in 2013. Entering the game, the Bears were 54–35–5 in season openers, the most wins of any team, and they had not lost an opening game since 2009, the most in the NFC and second-most in the NFL behind the New England Patriots. The Bears were 7–4 against the Bills, with their last meeting being a 22–19 victory in Toronto in 2010, while winning 40–7 in the last game between the two at Soldier Field; the Bears had won all five meetings between the two in Chicago. When comparing the two teams in 2013 statistically, the Bears had the advantage in three offensive categories (points scored, total offense, and passing offense), while the Bills had the second-best rushing offense, compared to the Bears' 16th-ranked rushing game. On defense, the Bears were outmatched in all three categories (total defense, rushing defense, and passing defense), but are one spot higher than Buffalo in turnover ratio (+5 to +3). Scout.com's Jeremy Stoltz writes that one of the players the Bears must contain is the defensive tackle duo of Mario Williams and Marcell Dareus, who had a combined 139 total tackles, 18.0 sacks and two forced fumbles during 2013. While the Bears' offensive line boasted the fourth-least sacks, none of the five starters played in the preseason. As a result, to combat the rush, the Bears need Jay Cutler to release the ball quickly. For the Bears' defense, Stoltz stated all the Bears needed to do was stop Buffalo's running backs Fred Jackson and C. J. Spiller, as the Bills had the second-best rushing attack in the league. The Bears were favored to win by seven points, the third-largest spread of the week. Matt Forté, Charles Tillman, and Robbie Gould were the captains for the game. David Fales, Kelvin Hayden, Tony Fiammetta, Khaseem Greene, Charles Leno, David Bass and Cornelius Washington were inactive for the game.

The Bears won the coin toss, and elected to kick. After Buffalo punted, Chicago scored on Cutler's 12-yard touchdown pass to Martellus Bennett, which the Bills retaliated with E. J. Manuel's two-yard touchdown run. On the Bears' first drive of the second quarter, Brandon Marshall fumbled, with linebacker Preston Brown recovering; the Bills would score on Dan Carpenter's 50-yard field goal. Afterwards, Cutler was intercepted by former Bear Corey Graham after Bennett did not "turn to look for the ball in time", with the Bills again capitalizing on the takeaway, with Manuel's seven-yard touchdown pass to Spiller, and the half ended with Buffalo leading 17–7. On the Bears' first possession of the third quarter, Gould kicked a five-yard field goal, and on the Bills' first drive of the half, Chris Conte read a pass intended for Marquise Goodwin, stepping in front of the pass to intercept the ball. On Chicago's ensuing drive, the offense rallied to tie the score on Cutler's 11-yard touchdown pass to Marshall. In the fourth quarter, the Bears drove from their own six-yard line to reach the Buffalo 34, but Cutler's forced pass intended for Bennett was intercepted by Kyle Williams; Carpenter would kick a 33-yard field goal, which the Bears responded with Gould's 37-yarder. The Bills would kneel to end regulation with a 20–20 score. After the Bears went three-and-out, the Bills started on their own 22-yard line, but drove to the Bears' 39. On the next play, Jackson found a hole in the line of scrimmage, getting past Lance Briggs. Conte reached Jackson at the 20-yard line, but was stiff-armed; Conte attempted to tackle again, but was knocked down, with Jackson being pushed out of bounds at the one-yard line. Two plays later, Carpenter kicked the game-winning 27-yard field goal.

Four of the Bears' offensive starters suffered injuries during the game: Roberto Garza (right ankle) and Matt Slauson (left ankle) did not play after the first half, Alshon Jeffery (hamstring) departed in the third quarter, while Marshall (right ankle) was hurt after being tackled. Conte received scrutiny after the game for failing to tackle Jackson, but defended himself by saying, "It was a play where it's the end of the game – I've got to get the ball out or something. If I hit him, it's a field goal no matter what, so I've got to try and get the ball out. It's a desperation play where I've got to try and punch the ball or something."

==== Week 2: at San Francisco 49ers ====
Week Two: Chicago Bears at San Francisco 49ers – Game summary

Quarter	1	2	3	4	Total
**Bears**	0	7	0	21	**28**
49ers	10	7	3	0	**20**

at Levi's Stadium, Santa Clara, California

- Date: September 14
- Game time: 7:30 p.m. CDT/5:30 p.m. PDT
- Game weather: 78 °F (26 °C), sunny
- Game attendance: 70,799
- Referee: Carl Cheffers
- TV announcers (NBC): Al Michaels, Cris Collinsworth and Michele Tafoya
- Recap, Gamebook

Game information

First quarter

- SF – Michael Crabtree 3 yard pass from Colin Kaepernick, Phil Dawson XP good, 12:42 (SF 7–0). **Drive: 3 plays, 8 yards, 0:34**
- SF – Phil Dawson 27 yard field goal, 2:48 (SF 10–0). **Drive: 14 plays, 72 yards, 7:44**

Second quarter

- SF – Frank Gore 8 yard run, Phil Dawson XP good, 2:22 (SF 17–0). **Drive: 4 plays, 30 yards, 1:03**
- CHI – Brandon Marshall 17 yard pass from Jay Cutler, Robbie Gould XP good, 0:13 (SF 17–7). **Drive: 7 plays, 80 yards, 2:09**

Third quarter

- SF – Phil Dawson 24 yard field goal, 5:56 (SF 20–7). **Drive: 14 plays, 84 yards, 9:04**

Fourth quarter

- CHI – Brandon Marshall 5 yard pass from Jay Cutler, Robbie Gould XP good, 13:35 (SF 20–14). **Drive: 13 plays, 80 yards, 7:21**
- CHI – Martellus Bennett 3 yard pass from Jay Cutler, Robbie Gould XP good, 13:14 (CHI 21–20). **Drive: 1 play, 3 yards, 0:03**
- CHI – Brandon Marshall 3 yard pass from Jay Cutler, Robbie Gould XP good, 6:55 (CHI 28–20). **Drive: 4 plays, 42 yards, 8:05**

Top passers

- CHI – Jay Cutler, 23/34, 176 yards, 4 TD
- SF – Colin Kaepernick, 21/34, 248 yards, 1 TD, 3 INT

Top rushers

- CHI – Jay Cutler, 5 carries, 25 yards
- SF – Colin Kaepernick, 9 carries, 66 yards

Top receivers

- CHI – Martellus Bennett, 7 receptions, 37 yards, 1 TD
- SF – Michael Crabtree, 7 receptions, 82 yards, 1 TD

Top tacklers

- CHI – Ryan Mundy, 6 tackles
- SF – Patrick Willis, 7 tackles

In the previous meeting between Chicago and San Francisco at Candlestick Park in 2012, the 49ers won 32–7. Entering the game, the 49ers led the all-time series 32–29–1; while the Bears had won five of the last eight meetings between the two since 2001, they had lost all eight road games against the 49ers since 1985. Comparing the two teams' week one rankings, the Bears had more total and passing yards than the 49ers, 427–319 and 341–192, respectively, while the 49ers had more rushing yards (127–86). Defensively, the 49ers allowed more yards (382–360) and allowed two more sacks than the Bears in week one. Writing for WBBM-TV, Bears radio play-by-play commentator Jeff Joniak stated the Bears' offense had a chance to utilize their running backs, as the 49ers had allowed the Dallas Cowboys to record 100 rushing yards in week one, the first time in 18 games, and with linebackers NaVorro Bowman and Aldon Smith inactive, the Bears had the chance to attack on the ground. For the Bears' passing game, recording short passes was important, while stating playing against the 49ers' defense "requires patience", with Vic Fangio utilizing zone defense blitzes. Additionally, Jay Cutler had struggled against the 49ers during his career, being 0–2, with one touchdown, six interceptions, and a 59.2 passer rating. On defense, the Bears had to contain Colin Kaepernick, who had thrown for two touchdowns the previous week and recorded his fourth-best passer rating (125.5), and in his first career start, had guided the 49ers to the victory over the Bears in 2012. The Bears also faced a challenge in 49ers' running backs Frank Gore and rookie Carlos Hyde, the former having become the 29th player to record 10,000 career rushing yards the previous week, and the latter averaged 7.1 yards and scored a touchdown. Against San Francisco's receivers, while Anquan Boldin and Michael Crabtree were not fast, their physicality allows them to make blocks and "bully defensive backs". The 49ers were favorites to win, with every ESPN analyst but former Bears head coach Mike Ditka to predict a 49ers victory. Jermon Bushrod, Lamarr Houston, and Sherrick McManis served as team captains. For the game, Josh Morgan, Khaseem Greene, Roberto Garza, Matt Slauson, Charles Leno, David Bass, and Cornelius Washington were scratched.

The 49ers won the coin toss, and decided to kick. On the Bears' first drive, Pat O'Donnell's punt was blocked by Aaron Lynch, and the 49ers scored on Kaepernick's three-yard touchdown pass to Crabtree, the first score in Levi's Stadium history after the play stood via review. On the 49ers' next drive, Kaepernick was intercepted by Charles Tillman, but the pick was overturned; Phil Dawson would kick a 27-yard field goal, the final score of the first quarter. On San Francisco's second drive of the second quarter, Kaepernick's pass for Boldin would be intercepted by a diving Chris Conte, though the Bears failed to take advantage, being forced to punt. Gore would then score on a 54-yard run, which was nullified by a holding call on Boldin, and two plays later, Kaepernick was stripped by Jared Allen, and the ball was recovered by Danny McCray, but the Bears would again be forced to punt. The 49ers extended the lead by ten points on Gore's eight-yard touchdown run, but the Bears managed to score for the first time in the half on Cutler's 17-yard touchdown pass to Brandon Marshall, who caught the pass with one hand. In the second half, the 49ers scored on Dawson's 24-yard kick, culminating a drive that took 9:04. On the Bears' next drive, Cutler threw a five-yard touchdown pass to Marshall, narrowing the score to 20–14. On the first play of San Francisco's next drive, Kaepernick's pass for Crabtree was pulled away by Kyle Fuller, with the Bears scoring on the first play with Cutler's three-yard touchdown to Martellus Bennett to give the Bears the 21–20 lead. Kaepernick was intercepted again by Fuller on the next drive after Fuller reached his pass intended for Derek Carrier, the Bears converting the pick into a Cutler three-yard touchdown to Marshall, increasing the lead by eight. On San Francisco's final drive, the offense reached Chicago's 17-yard line, but on 4th down, Kaepernick's pass to Crabtree fell incomplete, and Cutler kneeled twice to end the game.

The game featured 26 penalties, 10 by the Bears for 58 yards, and 16 by the 49ers for 118 yards. Late in the second quarter, Cutler, who had completed only 8 of 18 passes for 38 yards, was hit by Quinton Dial, and after the hit, Cutler completed 15 of 16 passes for 138 yards and four touchdowns. Fuller became the first rookie in Bears history to record two interceptions in a game since Chris Harris against the Green Bay Packers in 2005.

==== Week 3: at New York Jets ====
Week Three: Chicago Bears at New York Jets – Game summary

Quarter	1	2	3	4	Total
**Bears**	14	3	7	3	**27**
Jets	3	10	3	3	**19**

at MetLife Stadium, East Rutherford, New Jersey

- Date: September 22
- Game time: 8:30 p.m. EDT/7:30 p.m. CDT
- Game weather: 60 °F (16 °C), clear
- Game attendance: 78,160
- Referee: Jerome Boger
- TV announcers (ESPN): Mike Tirico, Jon Gruden and Lisa Salters
- Recap, Gamebook

Game information

First quarter

- CHI – Ryan Mundy 45 yard interception return, Robbie Gould XP good, 14:28 (CHI 7–0).
- CHI – Martellus Bennett 7 yard pass from Jay Cutler, Robbie Gould XP good, 9:54 (CHI 14–0). **Drive: 3 plays, 40 yards, 0:21**
- NYJ – Nick Folk 43 yard field goal, 3:42 (CHI 14–3). **Drive: 11 plays, 55 yards, 6:12**

Second quarter

- CHI – Robbie Gould 24 yard field goal, 13:54 (CHI 17–3). **Drive: 15 plays, 79 yards, 4:48**
- NYJ – Nick Folk 28 yard field goal, 9:57 (CHI 17–6). **Drive: 8 plays, 66 yards, 3:57**
- NYJ – Jeremy Kerley 19 yard pass from Geno Smith, Nick Folk XP good, 3:45 (CHI 17–13). **Drive: 9 plays, 77 yards, 3:36**

Third quarter

- CHI – Martellus Bennett 13 yard pass from Jay Cutler, Robbie Gould XP good, 11:28 (CHI 24–13). **Drive: 6 plays, 80 yards, 3:32**
- NYJ – Nick Folk 22 yard field goal, 0:27 (CHI 24–16). **Drive: 6 plays, 24 yards, 3:27**

Fourth quarter

- NYJ – Nick Folk 42 yard field goal, 9:52 (CHI 24–19). **Drive: 10 plays, 41 yards, 4:10**
- CHI – Robbie Gould 45 yard field goal, 3:10 (CHI 27–19). **Drive: 12 plays, 46 yards, 6:42**

Top passers

- CHI – Jay Cutler, 23/38, 225 yards, 2 TD
- NYJ – Geno Smith, 26/43, 316 yards, 1 TD, 2 INT

Top rushers

- CHI – Matt Forte, 13 carries, 33 yards
- NYJ – Chris Ivory, 10 carries, 44 yards

Top receivers

- CHI – Alshon Jeffery, 8 receptions, 105 yards
- NYJ – Jeremy Kerley, 7 receptions, 81 yards, 1 TD

Top tacklers

- CHI – Jon Bostic, 6 tackles
- NYJ – Demario Davis, 7 tackles

The Bears traveled to East Rutherford, New Jersey to play the New York Jets on Monday Night Football, the Bears having won the last three meeting between the two since 2001, the last being a 38–34 win in 2010, and the Bears led the all-time series 7–3. When comparing the two teams, Brad Gagnon of CBSSports.com stated they are "complete opposites", with Marc Trestman being a pass-first coach, while Rex Ryan prefers running first; as a result, while the Bears were ranked higher in passer rating (9th to 25th) and QB rating against (4th to 26th), the Jets had the advantage in yards per carry (5th to 23rd) and yards per carry against (3rd to 28th). In the running game, Gagnon writes the Bears' 23rd-ranked rushing offense would have trouble against the third-ranked Jets run defense, which had allowed only 2.8 yards per carry. He adds that as a result, the Bears would be forced to throw – 71 percent of Chicago's offensive plays had been passing, the most in the league, which Gagnon states is not a "good thing", as the five teams with the highest passing percentage in the NFL in 2013 had losing records. Additionally, the passing attack would have to defend against the rush, with the Jets blitzing 75 percent of the time; New York had recorded 47 sacks since week one of 2013, tied for the 10th most in the league, while Pro Football Focus ranked Muhammad Wilkerson and Sheldon Richardson as the top 12 pass-rushing 3–4 defensive ends in the NFL, with Quinton Coples having the most QB pressures of a 3–4 OLB with ten. However, Jay Cutler had completed 67 percent of passes under pressure, the second-most in the NFL. the Bears led the league in completions of four yards or more on first down with 21, and despite injuries to Brandon Marshall and Alshon Jeffery, the passing game could have a chance against a secondary that struggled in the previous week against the Packers. Matt Forte would also be a viable passing option, but the Jets had the fifth-fewest receiving yards by an RB allowed with 28.5 On defense, the Bears would have to stop the Jets' rushing game, which led the league with 358 total rushing yards, while tying for third in the NFL with 33 runs of four yards or more, and averaged 5.54 yards on first down. Chris Ivory also had the highest rushing average with 6.3 yards, while the Jets averaged 5 yards offensively, and the Bears were allowing 5.3 yards per carry, while allowing a total of 320 yards and four touchdowns on 60 carries. On special teams, the Bears had promoted Rashad Ross, who averaged 32 return yards with the Washington Redskins in the preseason, from the practice squad, which appeared to be an improvement over Senorise Perry, who had returned only two of eleven kickoffs in the first two games of the season. The betting line for the game was New York by -2.5. The Bears' captains were Cutler, Lance Briggs, and Danny McCray, while Sherrick McManis, Shea McClellin, Roberto Garza, Matt Slauson, Charles Leno, and Trevor Scott were not active.

The Bears won the coin toss, and deferred until the second half. On the second play of the Jets' first drive, Smith's fake screen pass was intercepted by Ryan Mundy, scoring on a 45-yard return. After the Jets punted, the Bears also were forced to punt, but Jalen Saunders muffed the punt, which was recovered by Ahmad Dixon. Four plays later, Jay Cutler threw a seven-yard touchdown pass to Martellus Bennett, with New York scoring the final points of the first quarter via Nick Folk's 43-yard field goal. Both teams exchanged field goals on their first drives of the second quarter. On the Jets' next drive, Smith connected with Jeremy Kerley on a 19-yard pass to make the score 17–13. On the Bears' following possession, Cutler was stripped by David Harris, with Demario Davis scoring on the return. However, the officials had believed Cutler was downed prior to losing the ball, and while a challenge ruled the play as a fumble, the touchdown was not recorded. Despite the takeaway, the Jets would be forced to punt. The half would end with no additional scoring. On Chicago's first drive of the second half, Cutler threw a 13-yard touchdown pass to Bennett. After both teams traded punts, Smith and the Jets reached the Bears' 18-yard line, but was his pass intended for David Nelson was intercepted by Kyle Fuller in the endzone. The Jets would later kick a 22-yard field goal. In the final quarter, Folk kicked a 42-yarder, with Robbie Gould kicking one of 45 yards on the next drive, the score becoming 27–19. On New York's final drive of the game, the offense reached the Bears' nine-yard line, but on 4th and 5, Smith's pass for Kerley was defended by rookie Brock Vereen, and despite catching the ball, Kerley was out of bounds. The Bears kneeled three times to end the game.

The game marked the first time since week 16 of 2012 against the Arizona Cardinals that the Bears allowed fewer than 20 points in a game. Fuller, who was making his first career start, became the first NFL player in the last 20 years to record three interceptions and two forced fumbles in the first three games.

==== Week 4: vs. Green Bay Packers ====
Week Four: Green Bay Packers at Chicago Bears – Game summary

Quarter	1	2	3	4	Total
**Packers**	7	14	10	7	**38**
Bears	7	10	0	0	**17**

at Soldier Field, Chicago, Illinois

- Date: September 28
- Game time: 12:00 p.m. CDT
- Game weather: 70 °F (21 °C), partly cloudy
- Game attendance: 61,736
- Referee: Terry McAulay
- TV announcers (Fox): Kevin Burkhardt, John Lynch and Pam Oliver
- Recap, Gamebook

Game information

First quarter

- CHI – Brandon Marshall 6 yard pass from Jay Cutler, Robbie Gould XP good, 6:30 (CHI 7–0). **Drive: 15 plays, 80 yards, 8:30**
- GB – Eddie Lacy 2 yard run, Mason Crosby XP good, 4:08 (TIE 7–7). **Drive: 6 plays, 81 yards, 2:22**

Second quarter

- CHI – Robbie Gould 23 yard field goal, 13:58 (CHI 10–7). **Drive: 13 plays, 75 yards, 5:10**
- GB – Jordy Nelson 3 yard pass from Aaron Rodgers, Mason Crosby XP good, 10:11 (GB 14–10). **Drive: 10 plays, 78 yards, 3:47**
- CHI – Alshon Jeffery 8 yard pass from Jay Cutler, Robbie Gould XP good, 3:50 (CHI 17–14). **Drive: 10 plays, 80 yards, 6:21**
- GB – Randall Cobb 22 yard pass from Aaron Rodgers, Mason Crosby XP good, 1:03 (GB 21–17). **Drive: 7 plays, 61 plays, 2:47**

Third quarter

- GB – Mason Crosby 53 yard field goal, 10:57 (GB 24–17). **Drive: 8 plays, 35 yards, 4:03**
- GB – Jordy Nelson 11 yard pass from Aaron Rodgers, Mason Crosby XP good, 4:28 (GB 31–17). **Drive: 6 plays, 35 yards, 3:01**

Fourth quarter

- GB – Randall Cobb 3 yard pass from Aaron Rodgers, Mason Crosby XP good, 14:52 (GB 38–17). **Drive: 4 plays, 11 yards, 1:41**

Top passers

- GB – Aaron Rodgers, 22/28, 302 yards, 4 TD
- CHI – Jay Cutler, 22/34, 256 yards, 2 TD, 2 INT

Top rushers

- GB – Eddie Lacy, 17 carries, 48 yards, 1 TD
- CHI – Matt Forte, 23 carries, 122 yards

Top receivers

- GB – Jordy Nelson, 10 receptions, 108 yards, 2 TD
- CHI – Martellus Bennett, 9 receptions, 134 yards

Top tacklers

- GB – Morgan Burnett, 12 tackles
- CHI – Ryan Mundy, 8 tackles

For week four, the Bears donned their 1940s throwbacks when they hosted the 1–2 Packers, the Bears having led the all-time series 93–89–2, but the Packers had won 9 of the previous 11 games. On offense, the Bears' worst-ranked rushing game (64 yards per game) had a chance to produce against the Packers, who were ranked 30th by allowing 156 yards per game, while opponents had run a league-most 37.3 times per game while scoring an also league-high five rushing touchdowns. Also, Matt Forte had recorded 336 yards and four touchdowns against the Packers in his last two games. The offense also was challenged by the pass defense, with defenders Sam Shields and Tramon Williams, who were stingy in man coverage. For the Bears' defense, the Packers had also struggled on the run, ranking 26th in the league with a 78-yard rushing average and the longest run being of 17 yards, while having averaged only 3.63 yards per carry. Additionally, Green Bay was ranked 28th in the league in yards. However, the team faced the Packers' passing attack, which featured the receiving duo of Jordy Nelson and Randall Cobb. The former led the league in targets (37) and first downs (16), while ranking second in receiving yards (351), while the Bears had struggled with covering slant and dig routes, both of which Nelson excelled at. The latter had three touchdowns in 2014, but was used primarily for hitch and stick routes. The Packers were two-point favorites. Sherrick McManis, Shea McClellin, Roberto Garza, Matt Slauson, Jared Allen, Charles Leno, and Jeremiah Ratliff were inactive. Kyle Long, Alshon Jeffery, and Ryan Mundy served as team captains for the game, while the honorary captains were Dick Butkus and Kurt Becker.

The Packers won the coin toss, and decided to kick. On the first drive, the Bears scored on Jay Cutler's six-yard touchdown pass to Brandon Marshall, which the Packers responded with Eddie Lacy's two-yard touchdown run. During Chicago's next drive, on 4th and 1, Cutler fumbled the snap, and upon picking up the ball, recorded a 16-yard run on an accidental fumblerooski. The drive continued into the second quarter, ended with Robbie Gould kicking a 23-yard field goal. The two teams exchanged touchdowns on the final three plays: Aaron Rodgers' three-yard pass to Nelson, Cutler's eight-yard pass to Jeffery, and Rodgers' 22-yard pass to Cobb. The Bears reached the Packers' nine-yard line by the final play of the first half; on the play, Cutler's pass for Bennett was ruled short of a touchdown. During the television review, Micah Hyde covered the camera angle, preventing the touchdown and ending the half with the Packers leading 21–17. In the third quarter, the Packers drove to the Bears' 34-yard line, where Rodgers completed a touchdown pass to Davante Adams, which would be nullified by a holding penalty on center Corey Linsley; Crosby would eventually kick a 53-yard field goal. Afterwards, Cutler's pass for Josh Morgan would be tipped by Williams and intercepted by Clay Matthews, with Green Bay capitalizing on the takeaway with Rodgers' 11-yard touchdown pass to Nelson. On the next drive, Shields intercepted Cutler, and Crosby kicked a 23-yard field goal; however, a holding penalty on Jon Bostic led to Rodgers' three-yard touchdown pass to Cobb. On Chicago's next drive, Williams intercepted Cutler, but the play would be nullified; the Bears would subsequently punt. On the Packers' next drive, they would reach the Bears' 20-yard line before Crosby's field goal was blocked by Willie Young, the first block by the Bears in over a year. Jimmy Clausen replaced Cutler on the final drive, and the Bears ran out the clock to end the game.

The Bears recorded 496 yards, the first time since 1979 against the Minnesota Vikings that the Bears recorded such yardage and lost. The last time the team recorded more than 496 yards and lost occurred in 1947 against the Los Angeles Rams and Chicago Cardinals. Additionally, the rushing attack recorded 102 yards in the first quarter, the first time Chicago recorded at least 100 rushing yards in the first quarter since 2010 against the Carolina Panthers. The game was only the second in NFL history to have no total punts.

==== Week 5: at Carolina Panthers ====
Week Five: Chicago Bears at Carolina Panthers – Game summary

Quarter	1	2	3	4	Total
Bears	14	7	3	0	**24**
**Panthers**	7	7	7	10	**31**

at Bank of America Stadium, Charlotte, North Carolina

- Date: October 5
- Game time: 1:00 p.m. EDT/12:00 p.m. CDT
- Game weather: 60 °F (16 °C), sunny
- Game attendance: 73,659
- Referee: Tony Corrente
- TV announcers (Fox): Thom Brennaman, David Diehl and Laura Okmin
- Recap, Gamebook

Game information

First quarter

- CAR – Philly Brown 79 yard punt return, Graham Gano XP good, 10:56 (CAR 7–0).
- CHI – Matt Forte 10 yard pass from Jay Cutler, Robbie Gould XP good, 4:31 (TIE 7–7). **Drive: 3 plays, 28 yards, 0:47**
- CHI – Jay Cutler 10 yard run, Robbie Gould XP good, 2:13 (CHI 14–7). **Drive: 3 plays, 13 yards, 1:21**

Second quarter

- CHI – Alshon Jeffery 25 yard pass from Jay Cutler, Robbie Gould XP good, 10:51 (CHI 21–7). **Drive: 8 plays, 68 yards, 5:20**
- CAR – Greg Olsen 12 yard pass from Cam Newton, Graham Gano XP good, 0:12 (CHI 21–14). **Drive: 7 plays, 74 yards, 1:39**

Third quarter

- CAR – Chris Ogbonnaya 1 yard run, Graham Gano XP good, 7:16 (TIE 21–21). **Drive: 10 plays, 86 yards, 4:00**
- CHI – Robbie Gould 45 yard field goal, 2:38 (CHI 24–21). **Drive: 8 plays, 53 yards, 4:38**

Fourth quarter

- CAR – Graham Gano 44 yard field goal, 4:29 (TIE 24–24). **Drive: 4 plays, 6 yards, 1:27**
- CAR – Greg Olsen 6 yard pass from Cam Newton, Graham Gano XP good, 2:18 (CAR 31–24). **Drive: 6 plays, 23 yards, 2:00**

Top passers

- CHI – Jay Cutler, 28/36, 289 yards, 2 TD, 2 INT
- CAR – Cam Newton, 19/35, 255 yards, 2 TD, 1 INT

Top rushers

- CHI – Matt Forte, 17 carries, 61 yards
- CAR – Darrin Reaves, 11 carries, 65 yards

Top receivers

- CHI – Matt Forte, 12 receptions, 105 yards, 1 TD
- CAR – Greg Olsen, 6 receptions, 72 yards, 2 TD

Top tacklers

- CHI – Jared Allen, 2 tackles
- CAR – Luke Kuechly, 11 tackles

In week five, the Bears, looking to go 3–0 on the road for the first time since 2006, visited the 2–2 Carolina Panthers, the Bears having led the all-time series 5–3, and also having won the most recent meeting in 2012 23–22. The Bears had been plagued by inconsistency during the season, for example in the passing attack, with Jay Cutler, playing in his first away game with Chicago against Carolina, completing 67.5 percent in the two home games with four touchdowns and four interceptions while posting an 84.7 rating. On the road, he had completed 63.9 percent of passes with six touchdowns and no interceptions, along with a 106.3 rating. In two games against the Panthers, Cutler had thrown a touchdown and two picks with a 69.5 passer rating. The Bears had to protect Cutler from a Panthers defense that recorded 60 sacks in 2013, and despite missing Greg Hardy, featured defending Defensive Player of the Year Luke Kuechly and Star Lotulelei. However, Panthers' cornerback Antoine Cason was struggling during the year, having allowed three touchdowns. Additionally, the Panthers' had allowed 75 points the last two games, compared to 21 in the first two weeks, and while allowing an average 201.7 passing yards in the first three games, the team permitted the Baltimore Ravens' Joe Flacco to throw for 327 passing yards in their last game. On the ground, the Bears had an advantage against the Panthers' 27th-ranked rushing defense, which allowed 140.8 rushing yards per game, 264 rushing yards two games prior against the Pittsburgh Steelers, and a total 391 rushing yards in the last two games. The Bears also had a chance to capitalize on the Panthers' worst-ranked red zone offenses and defenses, with Chicago boasting a second- and sixth-ranked red zone offense and defense, respectively. The Panthers were the -2.5 favorite for the game's betting line. The Bears' inactives were Sherrick McManis, Ahmad Dixon, Shea McClellin, Roberto Garza, Charles Leno, and Jeremiah Ratliff, while Matt Slauson, D.J. Williams, and Robbie Gould were the captains.

After the Bears won the toss and kicked off, the Panthers punted on their drive, and on the punt return, Santonio Holmes fumbled the ball out of bounds. The Bears would also be forced to punt, and on the return, Philly Brown was tackled by Teddy Williams before receiving the ball, and while both teams were attempting to recover the ball, Brown picked up the ball and scored on the 79-yard return. On the Bears' next drive, despite reaching the Panthers' seven-yard line, Cutler's pass for Brandon Marshall went into double coverage and was intercepted by Roman Harper, who returned the pick 44 yards to the Bears' 49-yard line, but was ruled down by challenge, and as a result, the Panthers started the drive from their own eight-yard line. Three plays later, Isaiah Frey forced Kelvin Benjamin to fumble, recovering the loose ball at Carolina's 28-yard line. The Bears would score on Cutler's ten-yard touchdown pass to Matt Forte; Chicago would then capitalize on another turnover during the Panthers' next drive: after Willie Young strip-sacked Cam Newton, Lamarr Houston recovered at Carolina's 18-yard line, and on the Bears' ensuing drive, Cutler scored on a ten-yard run, the first rushing touchdown for Cutler since 2011 and the first for the team in 2014. The Bears' next drive lasted into the second quarter, and ended with the Bears extending the score to 21–7 after Cutler threw a 25-yard touchdown pass to Alshon Jeffery. The Panthers then drove to Chicago's 25-yard line, but the drive ended after Newton's pass was intercepted by a diving Lance Briggs. However, the Bears failed to take advantage of the pick, with Gould missing a 35-yard field goal. On the final drive for Carolina, Newton threw a nine-yard touchdown pass to Greg Olsen to make the score at halftime 21–14. After the Bears punted on their first drive of the second half, the Panthers reached the Bears' seven-yard line, and a penalty on Kyle Fuller moved the ball to the one-yard line, where Chris Ogbonnaya scored on a one-yard run to tie the game. Gould would give the Bears the lead again via a 45-yard field goal. The two teams exchanged punts five times in the fourth quarter, and on Chicago's third possession of the quarter, Cutler's pass for Holmes was overthrown and intercepted by Thomas DeCoud, which set up a Graham Gano 44-yard field goal. On the Bears' next play, Forte was stripped by Cason, and Kawann Short recovered. Six plays later, Cam Newton threw a 6-yard touchdown pass to Olsen to take the 31–24 lead. On the Bears' final drive, the offense faced 4th-and-21 from their own 34-yard line when Cutler fumbled while being sacked by Short, and Charles Johnson recovered. Carolina kneeled twice to end the game.

The Bears had three turnovers in the fourth quarter, the second team to do so in 2014, after the New York Giants, while committing two turnovers in consecutive possessions during the fourth quarter. In comparison, the team had only one in the first four games. In the passing game, poor production on short passes led to Cutler's struggles on longer throws, completing only one of five passes of 15 yards or more during the game, including two interceptions; entering the game, he was ranked 31st of 33 quarterbacks in completion percentage for such throws with 24 percent. However, the Bears had managed to score multiple passing touchdowns against the Panthers, the fourth time this had happened to the Panthers in 2014; the Panthers had only two games allowed in 2013.

==== Week 6: at Atlanta Falcons ====
Week Six: Chicago Bears at Atlanta Falcons – Game summary

Quarter	1	2	3	4	Total
**Bears**	0	13	6	8	**27**
Falcons	3	0	10	0	**13**

at Georgia Dome, Atlanta

- Date: October 12
- Game time: 4:25 p.m. EDT/3:25 p.m. CDT
- Game weather: Played indoors (dome stadium)
- Game attendance: 70,712
- Referee: Walt Anderson
- TV announcers (Fox): Justin Kutcher, David Diehl and Laura Okmin
- Recap, Gamebook

Game information

First quarter

- ATL – Matt Bryant 52 yard field goal, 9:41 (ATL 3–0). **Drive: 7 plays, 32 yards, 3:21**

Second quarter

- CHI – Robbie Gould 25 yard field, 14:47 (TIE 3–3). **Drive: 9 plays, 54 yards, 3:38**
- CHI – Josh Morgan 3 yard pass from Jay Cutler, Robbie Gould XP good, 5:59 (CHI 10–3). **Drive: 7 plays, 79 yards, 4:37)**
- CHI – Robbie Gould 28 yard field goal, 0:02 (CHI 13–3). **Drive: 12 plays, 83 yards, 4:04**

Third quarter

- ATL – Antone Smith 41 yard pass from Matt Ryan, Matt Bryant XP good, 11:19 (CHI 13–10). **Drive: 7 plays, 86 yards, 3:41**
- ATL – Matt Bryant 54 yard field goal, 6:19 (TIE 13–13). **Drive: 10 plays, 33 yards, 3:13**
- CHI – Matt Forte 6 yard run, Robbie Gould XP blocked, 5:06 (CHI 19–13). **Drive: 3 plays, 80 yards, 1:13**

Fourth quarter

- CHI – Matt Forte 9 yard run, Jay Cutler pass to Martellus Bennett for two-point conversion, 10:07 (CHI 27–13). **Drive: 15 plays, 87 yards, 8:28**

Top passers

- CHI – Jay Cutler, 26/38, 381 yards, 1 TD
- ATL – Matt Ryan, 19/37, 271 yards, 1 TD, 1 INT

Top rushers

- CHI – Matt Forte, 17 carries, 80 yards, 2 TD
- ATL – Steven Jackson, 6 carries, 25 yards

Top receivers

- CHI – Matt Forte, 10 receptions, 77 yards
- ATL – Julio Jones, 4 receptions, 68 yards

Top tacklers

- CHI – Khaseem Greene, 6 tackles
- ATL – Kemal Ishmael, 6 tackles

The Bears played the 2–3 Atlanta Falcons in week six, the Bears leading the all-time series between the two 13–12, 5–2 since 2001, and having won the most recent meeting in 2011, 30–12. Among the players the Bears faced was former returner and receiver Devin Hester, who had recorded 19 his NFL-record 20 return touchdowns with the team. Atlanta entered the game with the second-best passing offense in the league, with the receiver duo of Julio Jones and Roddy White having combined for 56 catches for 765 yards and five touchdowns. The former also led the league with 40 receptions and 552 yards. Hester, despite being 23rd in the NFL with 15.1 yards on 14 receptions, was one the Bears had to be prepared when he was used as a slot receiver. Among the goals the Bears' defense had was to rush Matt Ryan, who – despite being pressured often and tied with Jay Cutler with 130 pass attempts – was one of five quarterbacks with an average of eight yards per pass. Altogether, the Falcons had the third-best offense in yards gained, first in yards per play with 6.58, second in red zone touchdown percentage, and third with 29 points per game. However, the Bears offense could attack the Falcons' 28th-ranked rushing defense, which had been allowing 147.6 yards per game; the Bears had been recording 116 rushing yards each game. In addition, Atlanta had allowed a league-leading ten rushing touchdowns and six yards per play, while having the second-worst sacks per pass attempt with 2.47 percent, and was one of five teams allowing 400 yards per game. On special teams, Chicago would have to watch out for Hester, who recorded one of the league's four punt return touchdowns in 2014, while recording an average of 14.4 yards off eight punt returns, and was ranked eighth in the league with a kick return average of 24.2 yards. The Falcons were predicted by every CBSSports.com analyst to win, and were the -3.5 favorite. Brandon Marshall, Danny McCray, and Tim Jennings served as the Bears' captains, while Sherrick McManis, Ahmad Dixon, Shea McClellin, Lance Briggs, Jon Bostic, D. J. Williams, and Jermon Bushrod were inactive.

After the Bears won the coin toss, elected to receive, and punted on the first drive, the Falcons scored on their first drive with Matt Bryant's 52-yard field goal. After the Bears punted again, Jones was stripped by Kyle Fuller, but recovered; the Falcons would also punt. On Chicago's next drive, Cutler, after spiking the ball, was drilled by Paul Worrilow, allowing the Bears to gain a first down at the Falcons' 14-yard line; the drive lasted into the second quarter, and ended with Robbie Gould's 25-yard field goal; the Bears extended the lead on their next drive via Cutler's three-yard touchdown pass to Josh Morgan. The Falcons would be forced to punt again, with Chicago scoring off Gould's 28-yard field goal, the final scoring play of the first half, the Bears leading 13–3. After receiving the ball in the second half, the Falcons drove to Chicago's 41-yard line, where Ryan threw a 41-yard touchdown pass to Antone Smith, and the Falcons tied the game on their next possession off Bryant's 54-yard field goal. On Chicago's drive, the Falcons failed to provide safety assistance at the right side of the field, leading to Cutler throwing a 74-yard pass to Alshon Jeffery, completing it to the Falcons' five-yard line, with Matt Forte scoring on the next run, though Gould's extra point would be blocked by Ra'Shede Hageman. Now down by six, the Falcons failed to score, and were forced to punt. In the final quarter, the Bears reached the Falcons' eight-yard line, where Cutler threw a touchdown pass to Jeffery. However, the score would be nullified by Jeffery stepping out of the endzone on the play. On the next play, Martellus Bennett fought to the nine-yard line, where Forte scored on the rushing touchdown. The Bears then scored on the two-point conversion with Cutler's pass to Bennett, putting the Bears up by 14 points, 27–13. On Atlanta's next drive, Jared Allen recorded his first sack as a Bear, and would later be forced to punt, and the Bears would also punt. Afterwards, Ryan's pass for Jones would be intercepted by Demontre Hurst, though the Bears would have to punt. The Falcons' final drive ended with a turnover on downs, and Cutler would kneel thrice to end the game.

The Bears became the first team to win 750 total games. It took only 4 road games for the Bears to match their road win total from last season (the Bears were 3–5 on the road during the 2013 season). The 13 points allowed by the Bears were the fewest that they had ever allowed in a game under Marc Trestman. It was also fewest that they allowed in a game since Week 12 of the 2012 season when they held the Vikings to 10 points. When the Bears held a two-touchdown lead, Falcons fans began leaving the Dome, with Bears fans forcing the Falcons to utilize silent counts and had to call a timeout due to crowd noise and a ticking play clock.

==== Week 7: vs. Miami Dolphins ====
Week Seven: Miami Dolphins at Chicago Bears – Game summary

Quarter	1	2	3	4	Total
**Dolphins**	7	7	7	6	**27**
Bears	0	0	7	7	**14**

at Soldier Field, Chicago, Illinois

- Date: October 19
- Game time: 12:00 p.m. CDT
- Game weather: 50 °F (10 °C), partly cloudy
- Game attendance: 62,413
- Referee: Pete Morelli
- TV announcers (CBS): Greg Gumbel, Trent Green and Evan Washburn
- Recap, Gamebook

Game information

First quarter

- MIA – Charles Clay 13 yard pass from Ryan Tannehill, Caleb Sturgis XP good, 6:51 (MIA 7–0). **Drive: 8 plays, 81 yards, 4:24**

Second quarter

- MIA – Mike Wallace 10 yard pass from Ryan Tannehill, Caleb Sturgis XP good, 5:20 (MIA 14–0). **Drive: 3 plays, 23 yards, 1:33**

Third quarter

- CHI – Matt Forte 10 yard pass from Jay Cutler, Robbie Gould XP good, 7:59 (MIA 14–7). **Drive: 12 plays, 80 yards, 7:01**
- MIA – Lamar Miller 2 yard run, Caleb Sturgis XP good, 0:31 (MIA 21–7). **Drive: 13 plays, 83 yards, 7:28**

Fourth quarter

- MIA – Caleb Sturgis 33 yard field goal, 13:31 (MIA 24–7). **Drive: 4 plays, 2 yards, 0:52**
- CHI – Matt Forte 1 yard run, Robbie Gould XP good, 7:38 (MIA 24–14). **Drive: 6 plays, 73 yards, 2:05**
- MIA – Caleb Sturgis 19 yard field goal, 2:13 (MIA 27–14). **Drive: 12 plays, 65 yards, 5:25**

Top passers

- MIA – Ryan Tannehill, 25/32, 277 yards, 2 TD
- CHI – Jay Cutler, 21/34, 190 yards, 1 TD, 1 INT

Top rushers

- MIA – Lamar Miller, 18 carries, 61 yards, 1 TD
- CHI – Matt Forte, 12 carries, 49 yards, 1 TD

Top receivers

- MIA – Mike Wallace, 5 receptions, 46 yards, 1 TD
- CHI – Matt Forte, 6 receptions, 60 yards

Top tacklers

- MIA – Reshad Jones, 7 tackles, 1 INT
- CHI – Jeremiah Ratliff, 5 tackles

The Bears, seeking to avoid going 0–3 at home for the first time in ten years, hosted the Miami Dolphins in week seven, trailing the all-time series 4–7, though the Bears won the most recent game in 2010 16–0. The Bears had struggled at home during the season, scoring a total of 37 points and a -4 turnover differential; in contrast, the Bears had an average score of 26.5 and a +6 turnover difference on the road. In addition, Jay Cutler had nine passing touchdowns, two interceptions and a 104.6 passer rating in away games, while having four touchdowns, four interceptions (three of which occurred in the second half) and a rating of 84.7 at home, with a rating of 58.1 after halftime. Chicago had to protect Cutler from the defensive line duo of Cameron Wake and Olivier Vernon, both recording 1.5 sacks each in the previous week against the Packers. In addition, the Dolphins were ranked second in the league in sacks on third and fourth downs with 10. However, the Bears' receivers posed a size threat to the Miami secondary, though Miami was ranked third in yards per pass attempt allowed with 6.09, one of only eight teams allowing less than seven yards in 2014. The Dolphins also allowed only 3.8 yards per carry and yards allowed per play with 4.7 yards. On defense, the Bears would have to prepare for a Ryan Tannehill-led zone-read option offense, which has an average drive length of 3:08, third-fastest in the league. However, Tannehill could make mistakes, as he had thrown 35 interceptions in 37 career starts. The Dolphins also had the second-fewest completions of at least 20 yards with 11. The Bears would also have to watch the run game, which ranked third in the NFL with 4.97 yards per carry. Entering the game, the Bears' defense was tied for the fourth-most sacks (15), third-most interceptions (eight), and third in points recorded off turnovers (49). The Bears were the favorite by -3. Terrance Mitchell, Ahmad Dixon, Chris Conte, Lance Briggs, Jon Bostic, Charles Leno, and Trevor Scott were scratches for the game, while Jermon Bushrod, Brandon Marshall, Robbie Gould, Ryan Mundy and Jeremiah Ratliff were team captains.

The Dolphins won the toss, and elected to receive. On the first play from scrimmage, Tannehill was sacked by Ratliff for a loss of five yards; Ratliff would finish the game with a career-high 3.5 sacks. After both teams punted on their first drives, the Dolphins scored first on Tannehill's 13-yard touchdown pass to Charles Clay. On the Bears' next drive, Cutler fumbled on his own 38-yard line, but Ka'Deem Carey recovered the ball; the Bears would punt three plays later. Miami's eventual drive lasted into the second quarter, but ended with Caleb Sturgis missing a 50-yard field goal wide right. The Bears would reach the Dolphins' 37-yard line, but Cutler's pass for Martellus Bennett was intercepted by Reshad Jones, who returned the pick to the Bears' 29-yard line, and was stripped by Brandon Marshall, Koa Misi recovering at the 23-yard line. The fumble was subsequently challenged, but was upheld. Miami would drive to the Bears' eight-yard line, and two plays later, Tannehill threw a ten-yard touchdown pass to Mike Wallace. Both teams would exchange punts at the end of the half, Miami leading 14–0. On their first drive of the second half, the Bears scored their first points of the game with Cutler's ten-yard touchdown pass to Matt Forte, though the Dolphins retaliated on their next possession with Lamar Miller's two-yard touchdown run. The Bears' drive lasted into the fourth quarter, but ended at their own 24-yard line when Wake strip-sacked Cutler, recovering it at Chicago's 16. The Dolphins would go three-and-out on the drive, resorting to Sturgis' 33-yard field goal. On the Bears' next drive, Cutler threw a pass to Dante Rosario, who fumbled after being stripped by Cortland Finnegan, Randy Starks recovering at the Bears' 35-yard line. However, the Dolphins failed to take advantage of the takeaway, Sturgis' 37-yard field goal being blocked by Lamarr Houston. Starting from their own 27, the Bears reached the Dolphins' 44, and a defensive pass interference penalty on Jason Taylor brought the Bears to the five-yard line. Three plays later, Forte scored on a one-yard run. The Dolphins would score on their next drive via Miller's four-yard run, but was nullified by holding penalty on Clay; Sturgis would kick a 19-yard field goal to make the score 27–14. Chicago's final drive reached Miami's 15-yard line, but the offense failed to gain ground, Cutler first throwing an incomplete pass, then fumbling but recovering, and finally throwing two more incomplete passes. Tannehill would kneel twice to end the game.

The Bears fell to 0–4 in games where Cutler throws an interception. After the game, in the Bears' locker room, there were reports of shouting and players being pulled out of the room, with Marshall calling out Cutler, and Kyle Long criticizing the fans. Former Bears linebacker Blake Costanzo was also critical, stating Marc Trestman had "made the Bears soft". In an interview, Gould stated, "Everyone's trying to make this a story out of something that really wasn't that big of a deal. Obviously everyone's frustrated. Everyone wants to win. Our fans want to win. Coaches want to win. The players want to win. And everyone's obviously frustrated."

==== Week 8: at New England Patriots ====
Week Eight: Chicago Bears at New England Patriots – Game summary

Quarter	1	2	3	4	Total
Bears	0	7	8	8	**23**
**Patriots**	7	31	7	6	**51**

at Gillette Stadium, Foxborough, Massachusetts

- Date: October 26
- Game time: 1:00 p.m. EDT/12:00 p.m. CDT
- Game weather: 54 °F (12 °C), cloudy
- Game attendance: 68,756
- Referee: Brad Allen
- TV announcers (Fox): Sam Rosen, John Lynch and Pam Oliver
- Recap, Gamebook

Game information

First quarter

- NE – Rob Gronkowski 6 yard pass from Tom Brady, Stephen Gostkowski XP good, 9:41 (NE 7–0). **Drive: 5 plays, 55 yards, 2:22**

Second quarter

- NE – Stephen Gostkowski 23 yard field goal, 14:57 (NE 10–0). **Drive: 17 plays, 68 yards, 14:57**
- NE – Tim Wright 1 yard pass from Tom Brady, Stephen Gostkowski XP good, 8:09 (NE 17–0). **Drive: 10 plays, 76 yards, 5:27**
- CHI – Matt Forte 25 yard pass from Jay Cutler, Robbie Gould XP good, 5:32 (NE 17–7). **Drive: 5 plays, 77 yards, 2:37**
- NE – Rob Gronkowski 2 yard pass from Tom Brady, Stephen Gostkowski XP good, 1:52 (NE 24–7). **Drive: 10 plays, 80 yards, 3:40**
- NE – Brandon LaFell 9 yard pass from Tom Brady, Stephen Gostkowski XP good, 1:07 (NE 31–7). **Drive: 1 plays, 9 yards, 0:04**
- NE – Rob Ninkovich 15 yard fumble return, Stephen Gostkowski XP good, 0:55 (NE 38–7).

Third quarter

- NE – Rob Gronkowski 46 yard pass from Tom Brady, Stephen Gostkowski XP good, 12:42 (NE 45–7). **Drive: 6 plays, 80 yards, 2:18**
- CHI – Martellus Bennett 20 yard from Jay Cutler, Jay Cutler to Dante Rosario for two-point conversion, 0:54 (NE 45–15). **Drive: 7 plays, 80 yards, 3:16**

Fourth quarter

- NE – Stephen Gostkowski 27 yard field goal, 9:59 (NE 48–15). **Drive: 13 plays, 71 yards, 5:55**
- CHI – Alshon Jeffery 10 yard pass from Jay Cutler, Jay Cutler to Matt Forte for two-point conversion, 5:16 (NE 48–23). **Drive: 10 plays, 80 yards, 4:43**
- NE – Stephen Gostkowski 39 yard field goal, 2:09 (NE 51–23). **Drive: 7 plays, 21 yards, 3:07**

Top passers

- CHI – Jay Cutler, 20/30, 227 yards, 3 TD, 1 INT
- NE – Tom Brady, 30/35, 354 yards, 5 TD

Top rushers

- CHI – Matt Forte, 19 carries, 114 yards
- NE – Jonas Gray, 17 plays, 86 yards

Top receivers

- CHI – Martellus Bennett, 6 receptions, 95 yards, 1 TD
- NE – Brandon LaFell, 11 receptions, 124 yards, 1 TD

Top tacklers

- CHI – D. J. Williams, 2 tackles
- NE – Jamie Collins, 5 tackles

The Bears visited Gillette Stadium in week eight to take on the New England Patriots, the first game in Foxborough for the Bears since 2006, which had ended in a 17–13 loss. Chicago had never won in Foxborough, where the Patriots had won twelve consecutive games. The Bears trailed the all-time series 3–8 entering the series, and lost the most recent meeting at home in 2010, 36–7. A target the Bears could attack was the Patriots' run defense, which had allowed a season-high 218 rushing yards against the Jets, a combined 398 in losses to the Kansas City Chiefs and Dolphins, and was ranked 24th in the league by allowing 126.3 rushing yards per game on 28.7 attempts, by utilizing Matt Forte, the fifth-leading rusher in the NFL with 448 yards and league-leading 52 receptions for 436 yards. In addition, New England did not have defenders Jerod Mayo and Chandler Jones, and had allowed fifteen drives lasting at least ten plays in 2014, all but one culminating in a score. However, the Patriots' pass defense was more stingy, forcing quarterbacks to throw three interceptions on passes longer than 21 yards with a 37.1 passer rating, the sixth-worst in the league. On defense, the Bears had to contain Tom Brady, who had thrown for 964 yards, six touchdowns and three interceptions in three games against the Bears. Likewise, tight end Rob Gronkowski was among the targets of Brady, whose 42 of 68 targeted throws were to tight ends, seventh-most in the NFL. 71 percent of Gronkowski's catches had resulted in first downs, though he had caught only 31 of his 56 targets, and while Brady had never completed less than 60 percent of passes in his career, Miami and New York forced him to complete less than 55 percent. While the Bears could blitz Brady, they would have to prepare for the Patriots' no-huddle offense and Brady's quickie release. However, the Patriots' rushing offense was ranked only 26th in yards per carry with 3.75, though they had recorded 4.76 yards per first down rush. Like in week two, Mike Ditka was the lone ESPN analyst to predict a Bears victory. Terrance Mitchell, Danny McCray, Ahmad Dixon, Lance Briggs, Jon Bostic, Jordan Mills, and Charles Leno were inactive for the game.

After winning the coin toss, New England kicked off. The Bears punted on their first drive, while the Patriots scored on their first possession with Brady's six-yard touchdown pass to Gronkowski. The Bears would punt on their next two drives, while the Patriots scored on their following drives in the second quarter, with Stephen Gostkowski's 23-yard field goal and Brady's one-yard touchdown pass to Tim Wright. On the Bears' ensuing possession, Jay Cutler's pass for Martellus Bennett was intercepted by Devin McCourty, though it would be nullified by Brandon Browner's illegal contact penalty. The Patriots would score three times in 57 seconds: with 1:52 left in the second quarter, Brady threw a two-yard touchdown pass to Gronkowski; the Bears punted on the next drive, the Patriots returning it 42 yards to the Bears' 19-yard line, and a holding penalty on Trevor Scott moved the ball to the nine, where Brady threw a touchdown pass to Brandon LaFell with 1:07 remaining. On the Bears' next play, Cutler fumbled, and Rob Ninkovich recovered, scoring on the 15-yard return with 55 seconds left in the half. The Bears' final drive of the half ended with Cutler's pass for Brandon Marshall being intercepted by Darrelle Revis at the Patriots' five-yard line. On New England's first drive of the second half, they extended the lead to 45–7 with Brady's 46-yard touchdown pass to Gronkowski. After the Bears failed to convert on 4th-and-10 from the Patriots' 26, the Patriots were forced to punt for the first and only time in the game. The Bears would score on the following possession with Cutler's 20-yard touchdown pass to Bennett, followed by a two-point conversion pass to Dante Rosario being completed. The Patriots' next drive would last into the fourth quarter, and ended with Gostkowski's 27-yard field goal. Chicago would then score on their following drive with Cutler's ten-yard touchdown pass to Alshon Jeffery, followed by Cutler's two-point conversion pass to Matt Forte, decreasing the deficit to 25 points. Patriots' backup quarterback Jimmy Garoppolo substituted for Brady on their next drive, and five plays later, Lamarr Houston sacked Garoppolo, his first sack of the year. However, when he was celebrating, Houston tore his ACL, and would be out for the rest of the season. Gostkowski would kick a 39-yard field goal to make the score 51–23. Jimmy Clausen replaced Cutler on the Bears' last drive, ending with the Bears failing to convert on 4th down. Garoppolo would kneel once to end the game.

Until the week ten game against the Packers, the 38 points allowed in the first half were the most in team history.

==== Week 9: Bye week ====
The Bears entered the bye week with a 3–5 record, tied with the Vikings for last in the NFC North, two games behind the Packers, and four behind the Detroit Lions. The last time the Bears had been 3–5, yet made the playoffs was in 1979, and had also performed the feat in 1977, while the last time that Chicago had made the playoffs after having a record of two games below .500 occurred in 2005, when the team was 1–3, but finished the regular season 11–5.

On offense, the Bears were tied for seventh in the league in passes per game with 37.4 and 27th in rushing attempts per game with 23.5. The offense had also regressed in points scored per game; in 2013, the team averaged 27.8 points, while after eight games in 2014, had scored only 22.4, despite having all 11 starters from 2013 returning. In their first three games, the Bears had a +4 turnover margin with eight turnovers forced and four turnovers allowed, but in their last five games, the margin was -7 with four takeaways and 11 giveaways, including -5 in the previous two games with no forced turnovers and five allowed turnovers; this marked the first time that the Bears had failed to force a turnover in consecutive games since 2010. Despite these struggles, the Bears' offense had the league's fifth-best red zone scoring percentage with 88.5.

==== Week 10: at Green Bay Packers ====
Week Ten: Chicago Bears at Green Bay Packers – Game summary

Quarter	1	2	3	4	Total
Bears	0	0	7	7	**14**
**Packers**	14	28	6	7	**55**

at Lambeau Field, Green Bay, Wisconsin

- Date: November 9
- Game time: 7:30 p.m. CST
- Game weather: 34 °F (1 °C), mostly cloudy
- Game attendance: 78,292
- Referee: Craig Wrolstad
- TV announcers (NBC): Al Michaels, Cris Collinsworth and Michele Tafoya
- Recap, Gamebook

Game information

First quarter

- GB – Brandon Bostick 1 yard pass from Aaron Rodgers, Mason Crosby XP good, 6:13 (GB 7–0). **Drive: 12 plays, 71 yards, 5:44**
- GB – Andrew Quarless 4 yard pass from Aaron Rodgers, Mason Crosby XP good, 3:52 (GB 14–0). **Drive: 4 plays, 23 yards, 4:01**

Second quarter

- GB – Jordy Nelson 73 yard pass from Aaron Rodgers, Mason Crosby XP good, 14:48 (GB 21–0). **Drive: 3 plays, 72 yards, 0:34**
- GB – Jordy Nelson 40 yard pass from Aaron Rodgers, Mason Crosby XP good, 12:09 (GB 28–0). **Drive: 4 plays, 54 yards, 1:30**
- GB – Eddie Lacy 56 yard pass from Aaron Rodgers, Mason Crosby XP good, 4:48 (GB 35–0). **Drive: 5 plays, 95 yards, 3:10**
- GB – Randall Cobb 18 yard pass from Aaron Rodgers, Mason Crosby XP good, 0:14 (GB 42–0). **Drive: 6 plays, 32 yards, 0:48**

Third quarter

- GB – Mason Crosby 20 yard field goal, 10:48 (GB 45–0). **Drive: 4 plays, 6 yards, 1:01**
- CHI – Brandon Marshall 45 yard pass from Jay Cutler, Robbie Gould XP good, 7:44 (GB 45–7). **Drive: 5 plays, 75 yards, 3:04**
- GB – Mason Crosby 52 yard field goal, 5:27 (GB 48–7). **Drive: 6 plays, 46 yards, 2:17**

Fourth quarter

- GB – Casey Hayward 82 yard interception return, Mason Crosby XP good, 10:41 (GB 55–7).
- CHI – Chris Williams 101 yard kick return, Robbie Gould XP good, 10:27 (GB 55–14).

Top passers

- CHI – Jay Cutler, 22/37, 272 yards, 1 TD, 2 INT
- GB – Aaron Rodgers, 18/27, 315 yards, 6 TD

Top rushers

- CHI – Matt Forte, 17 carries, 54 yards
- GB – DuJuan Harris, 8 carries, 52 yards

Top receivers

- CHI – Brandon Marshall, 8 receptions, 112 yards, 1 TD
- GB – Jordy Nelson, 6 receptions, 152 yards, 2 TD

Top tacklers

- CHI – Ryan Mundy, 9 tackles
- GB – Clay Matthews III, 9 tackles

The Bears played the Packers for the second time in the season, this time on the road at Lambeau Field, where the Packers had won all three of their home games in 2014 with a league-high 37.0 points per game at home. The game was broadcast on NBC Sunday Night Football, the ninth consecutive year that a Bears-Packers was held in prime time. Entering the game, Jay Cutler had struggled against the Packers, with a 67.0 passer rating, the lowest against any team. He also had thrown 13 touchdowns against 19 interceptions, and heading into the game, led the league in turnovers with 12, which led to 44 total points by opponents. However, the Bears' rushing attack took on the Packers' worst-ranked run defense, which had allowed 153.5 yards per game on 32.1 rushing attempts. The offense had to avoid long-distance drives, as they were ranked 29th in the NFL in points scored outside the red zone with 31. On defense, the Bears' rushing defense faced a Green Bay rushing game that was one of ten teams in the NFL to average less than 100 yards per game with 97.5 yards on 24.3 attempt, which ranked 26th, ahead of the Bears by one spot. However, the Packers also averaged 4.02 yards per carry and 4.3 yards per carry on first down. The Bears' pass defense also had to face Aaron Rodgers, who ranked third in the league with 8.22 yards per pass. In addition, the team had to be wary in the event they attempted to blitz; Rodgers had the highest passer rating against the blitz with 130.71, along with eight touchdowns and one interception. Over their previous five games, the Packers had scored an average of 33.6 points, while the Bears had allowed 32 average points in their last five games. The Packers were seven-point favorites, and the game's over/under of 53.5 points is the highest total of week ten games. Terrance Mitchell, Khaseem Greene, Darryl Sharpton, Eben Britton, Blake Annen, David Bass, and DeDe Lattimore were the inactives for the game.

The Bears won the coin toss, and received, but punted after their first drive. From their own 29-yard line, the Packers drove to the Bears' one, where Rodgers threw a one-yard touchdown pass to Brandon Bostick. On the second play of the Bears' next drive, Cutler was intercepted by Micah Hyde, and the Packers converted the turnover into a Rodgers' four-yard touchdown pass to Andrew Quarless. After the Bears were forced to punt again, the Packers' drive (which lasted into the second quarter) ended with Rodgers throwing a 73-yard touchdown pass to Jordy Nelson, and scored again after the Bears punted for the fourth consecutive time, this time on Rodgers' 40-yard touchdown pass to Nelson. On Chicago's next possession, the offense reached the Packers' four-yard line, but on 4th down, Cutler's pass to Alshon Jeffery was incomplete, and from their own five-yard line, the Packers eventually scored on Rodgers' 56-yard touchdown pass to Eddie Lacy. Chicago's next drive again led to zero points, with Cutler being sacked on 4th down by Morgan Burnett. The Packers reclaimed the ball on their 43-yard line, but two plays later, reached the Bears' seven-yard line after Tim Jennings was flagged for pass interference of 53 yards. However, Randall Cobb fumbled after being stripped by Lance Briggs, Ryan Mundy recovering in the endzone. However, the Bears would give the ball back with Cutler being strip-sacked by Julius Peppers at the Bears' 37-yard line. The Packers would extend their lead to 42–0 with Rodgers throwing an 18-yard touchdown pass to Cobb. The Bears ended the first half with a kneel. In the third quarter, the Packers punted for the first time in the game, the ball being returned for no gain at the Bears' 30-yard line, but would be pushed back to the 15-yard line due to Teddy Williams' personal foul penalty. After the Bears went three-and-out, Pat O'Donnell's punt was kicked by Jarrett Boykin and recovered by O'Donnell; the block was officially recorded as a fumble, and as a result, the Bears were considered to have turned the ball on downs. The Packers would score on Mason Crosby's 20-yard field goal. Despite a chance to tie the NFL record for most touchdown passes in a game, Rodgers was pulled for the Packers' third drive of the quarter for Matt Flynn. The Bears scored their first points of the game off Cutler's 45-yard touchdown pass to Brandon Marshall. Crosby would kick another field goal, this time a 52-yarder, to make the score 48–7. After both teams exchanged punts, the Bears' drive, which went into the final quarter, reached the Packers' 18-yard line, but Cutler's pass for Matt Forte hit Kyle Long's head, and bounced into Casey Hayward's hands, who scored on the 82-yard return. On the ensuing kickoff, with blocking along the Bears' sideline, Chris Williams scored on the 101-yard return to make the score 55–14. After the Packers punted again, Jimmy Clausen replaced Cutler for the Bears' final drive, but was sacked by Sam Barrington on 4th down; the Packers would run out the clock to end the game.

The 42 points allowed in the first half was a franchise record, and the six touchdown passes allowed in the half was an NFL record. By allowing 51 and 55 points against the Patriots and Packers, respectively, the Bears became the first team since the 1923 Rochester Jeffersons to allow at least 50 points in two consecutive games.

==== Week 11: vs. Minnesota Vikings ====
Week Eleven: Minnesota Vikings at Chicago Bears – Game summary

Quarter	1	2	3	4	Total
Vikings	10	0	0	3	**13**
**Bears**	0	14	0	7	**21**

at Soldier Field, Chicago, Illinois

- Date: November 16
- Game time: 12:00 p.m. CST
- Game weather: 31 °F (−1 °C), cloudy, flurries
- Game attendance: 61,792
- Referee: Ron Torbert
- TV announcers (CBS): Kevin Harlan, Rich Gannon and Stacey Dales
- Recap, Gamebook

Game information

First quarter

- MIN – Blair Walsh 50 yard field goal, 11:21 (MIN 3–0). **Drive: 7 plays, 39 yards, 3:39**
- MIN – Rhett Ellison 7 yard pass from Teddy Bridgewater, Blair Walsh XP good, 3:16 (MIN 10–0). **Drive: 5 plays, 63 yards, 2:46**

Second quarter

- CHI – Alshon Jeffery 27 yard pass from Jay Cutler, Robbie Gould XP good, 13:06 (MIN 10–7). **Drive: 10 plays, 81 yards, 5:10**
- CHI – Brandon Marshall 44 yard pass from Jay Cutler, Robbie Gould XP good, 2:49 (CHI 14–10). **Drive: 4 plays, 73 yards, 1:47**

Third quarter

- No scoring

Fourth quarter

- CHI – Brandon Marshall 4 yard pass from Jay Cutler, Robbie Gould XP good, 8:51 (CHI 21–10). **Drive: 16 plays, 72 yards, 7:35**
- MIN – Blair Walsh 26 yard field goal, 4:04 (CHI 21–13). **Drive: 9 plays, 52 yards, 4:47**

Top passers

- MIN – Teddy Bridgewater, 18/28, 158 yards, 1 TD, 1 INT
- CHI – Jay Cutler, 31/43, 330 yards, 3 TD, 2 INT

Top rushers

- MIN – Andrew Sendejo, 1 carry, 48 yards
- CHI – Matt Forte, 26 carries, 117 yards

Top receivers

- MIN – Charles Johnson, 6 receptions, 87 yards
- CHI – Alshon Jeffery, 11 receptions, 135 yards, 1 TD

Top tacklers

- MIN – Chad Greenway, 9 tackles
- CHI – Demontre Hurst, 6 tackles

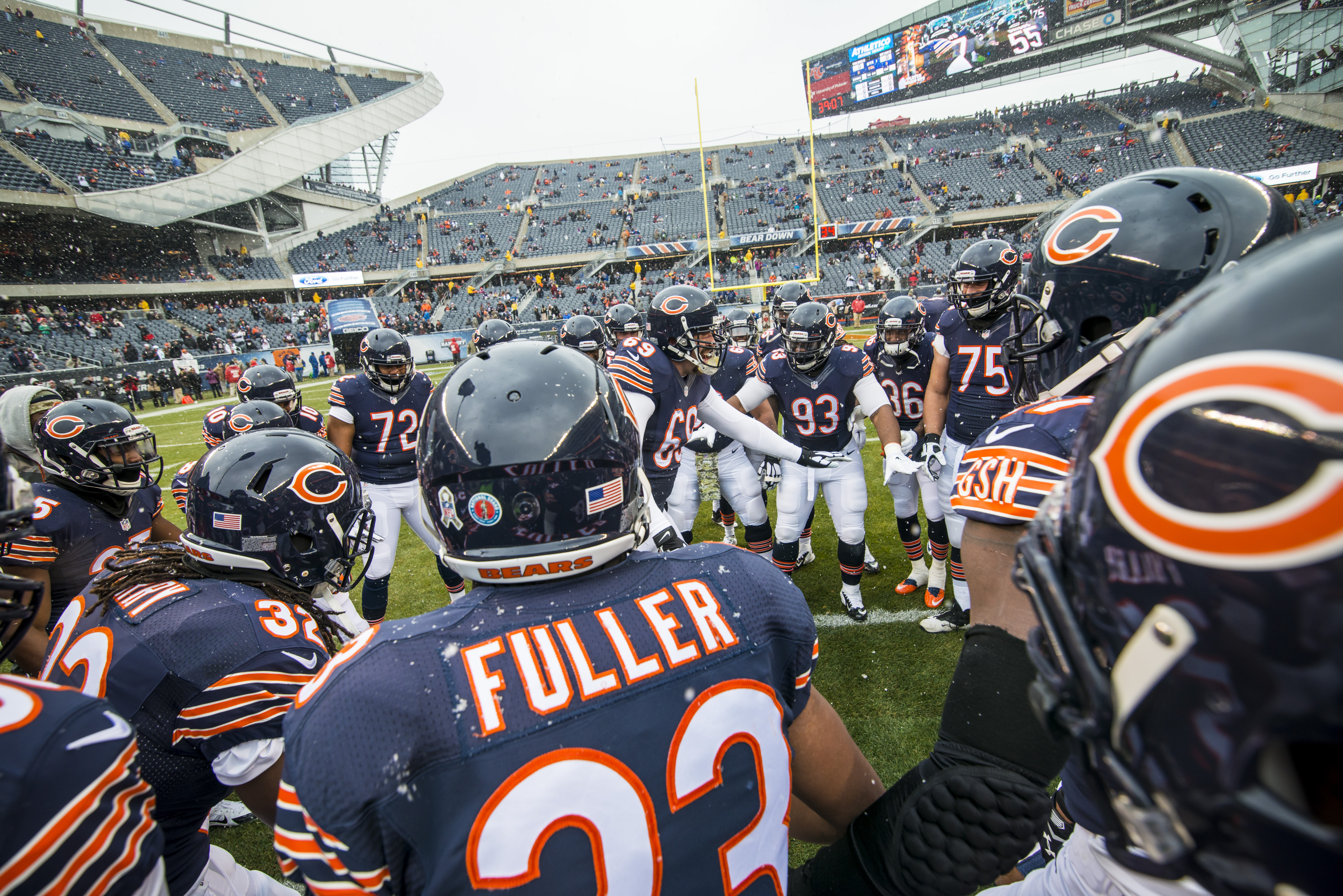
Jared Allen (center) giving a pre-game speech prior to week eleven

Chicago hosted the 4–5 Vikings in week eleven, the Vikings leading the all-time rivalry 53–51–4, though the Bears had won six consecutive games at Soldier Field between the two teams, dating back to 2007. Jeff Joniak stated the Bears must "play smart"; for instance, on offense, the Bears would have to watch for pressure from a blitz-happy Mike Zimmer-led defense, which ranked third in the league in sacks with 30, 20 of which were in their last four games, and was also ranked third in the NFL in hurries with 60, and forced offenses to commit a league-leading 13 holding penalties. The pass rush would try to attack Jay Cutler, who was tied for the most turnovers with 15, and was sacked 23 times. On first down, the Vikings blitzed 32 percent of the time, and 38 percent on third down. The Vikings also ranked fourth against the pass, allowing 213.6 yards per game. The Vikings had also improved on points allowed, allowing 18.3 points in their last four games after permitting 30.0 in the previous four. However, the Vikings' rush defense was allowing 5 yards per carry on first down. Defensively, the Bears were struggling, allowing a league-most 30.8 points per game while ranking 28th against the pass, allowing 268.6 yards per game. Despite Vikings' star running back Adrian Peterson being suspended for the game, Matt Asiata and Jerick McKinnon had seven runs of 20 yards or more, and the latter averaged 5.0 yards per carry. In the passing game, the Vikings struggled without tight end Kyle Rudolph, but he made his return in week eleven. Rookie quarterback Teddy Bridgewater was average in terms of accuracy and arm strength, having completed 53.9 percent of his passes, including 66 percent on third down, and while Greg Jennings had caught 60 percent of targets, Cordarrelle Patterson only caught 46 percent. The Vikings' third down offense also struggled without Rudolph and Peterson, with a 36.5 conversion percentage, and at the line, Matt Kalil had allowed a league-high 12 sacks. Both teams had struggled in moving the ball downfield, with the Bears and Vikings having 32 and 33 drives start inside their own 20-yard lines, respectively, and the latter being the second-most in the NFL. On such drives, Chicago had a touchdown, 14 points, and six turnovers, while Minnesota had no touchdowns, 6 points, and four turnovers. Josh Morgan, Terrance Mitchell, Darryl Sharpton, Eben Britton, Jordan Mills, Trevor Scott, and Blake Annen were the Bears' inactive players.

The Bears won the toss, and elected to defer. On their opening drive, the Vikings scored on Blair Walsh's 50-yard field goal. During the Bears' next drive, a play was whistled dead because Minnesota wanted to challenge whether a previous play was a fumble, and when Cutler voiced his complaints to the referees, he was penalized 15 yards for unsportsmanlike conduct; the ruling eventually stood, costing the Vikings their first timeout. The Bears later attempted to tie the score with Robbie Gould's 47-yard field goal, but missed the kick wide right. Later in the quarter, the Vikings extended their lead by ten with Bridgewater's seven-yard touchdown pass to Rhett Ellison. The Bears' next drive lasted into the second quarter, and ended on the fourth play of the quarter with Cutler's 27-yard touchdown pass to Alshon Jeffery. After both teams exchanged punts, the Bears were pinned on their own 27-yard line after a 20-yard illegal block penalty on Christian Jones. However, the Bears were able to reach the Vikings' 44-yard line, where Cutler threw a touchdown pass to Brandon Marshall, who outjumped Robinson for the catch; the score gave the Bears the 14–10 lead, the first time the Bears had led since week six against the Falcons, snapping a 207-minute, 11 second lead-less streak. After the Vikings punted again, the Bears' final possession of the first half ended after three plays: with 15 seconds remaining, the Bears called their final timeout of the half, and on the next play, Cutler was intercepted by Xavier Rhodes on a long pass to Jeffery. Bridgewater kneeled once to end the half. In the second half, the Bears started on their own 17-yard line, but reached the Vikings' one-yard line on 12 plays. On 4th and 1, Cutler attempted a quarterback sweep, but was tackled for no gain by Tom Johnson. After the Vikings punted, the Bears' following drive was ended when Cutler, attempting to avoid pressure from Johnson, had his pass for Martellus Bennett intercepted by Harrison Smith, who returned the pick 52 yards to the Chicago 27-yard line. However, the Vikings failed to capitalize on the takeaway, and at the Bears' 20-yard line, Walsh's field goal sailed wide right. The Bears' responding drive went into the final quarter, and ended with Cutler's four-yard touchdown pass to Marshall, killing 7:35 on the game clock on the possession. Minnesota attempted to respond with a scoring drive, and drew within eight points with Walsh's 26-yard field goal. On Chicago's next drive, the offense ran exclusively running plays for Matt Forte, which forced the Vikings to use all three of their timeouts, and the Bears would later be forced to punt, ending a drive that burned 2:01 off the clock. On the Vikings' first play of their final drive, Bridgewater was sacked by Willie Young for a five-yard loss, though the clock was stopped by the two-minute warning. The Vikings then recorded two consecutive first downs on Bridgewater's passes of 21 and 14 yards to Charles Johnson and McKinnon, respectively, and the next pass to Johnson resulted in a seven-yard gain to the Bears' 36-yard line. With less than a minute remaining, Bridgewater attempted to throw a pass to Johnson in the endzone, but was intercepted by Ryan Mundy. Cutler kneeled once to seal the 21–13 victory.

The win was the first at Soldier Field for the Bears of the 2014 season, and the first in eleven months, dating back to the December 9, 2013 game against the Dallas Cowboys.

==== Week 12: vs. Tampa Bay Buccaneers ====
Week Twelve: Tampa Bay Buccaneers at Chicago Bears – Game summary

Quarter	1	2	3	4	Total
Buccaneers	0	10	0	3	**13**
**Bears**	0	0	21	0	**21**

at Soldier Field, Chicago, Illinois

- Date: November 23
- Game time: 12:00 p.m. CST
- Game weather: 54 °F (12 °C), cloudy
- Game attendance: 61,109
- Referee: Walt Coleman
- TV announcers (Fox): Thom Brennaman, David Diehl and Laura Okmin
- Recap, Gamebook

Game information

First quarter

- No scoring

Second quarter

- TB – Mike Evans 19 yard pass from Josh McCown, Patrick Murray XP good, 13:24 (TB 7–0). **Drive: 6 plays, 46 yards, 3:15**
- TB – Patrick Murray 32 yard field goal, 0:04 (TB 10–0). **Drive: 12 plays, 74 yards, 1:44**

Third quarter

- CHI – Alshon Jeffery 2 yard pass from Jay Cutler, Robbie Gould XP good, 10:33 (TB 10–7). **Drive: 6 plays, 58 yards, 3:28**
- CHI – Matt Forte 13 yard run, Robbie Gould XP good, 4:51 (CHI 14–10). **Drive: 1 play, 13 yards, 0:06**
- CHI – Matt Forte 1 yard run, Robbie Gould XP good, 3:02 (CHI 21–10). **Drive: 4 plays, 15 yards, 1:36**

Fourth quarter

- TB – Patrick Murray 39 yard field goal, 4:56 (CHI 21–13). **Drive: 8 plays, 51 yards, 2:55**

Top passers

- TB – Josh McCown, 25/48, 341 yards, 1 TD, 2 INT
- CHI – Jay Cutler, 17/27, 130 yards, 1 TD

Top rushers

- TB – Doug Martin, 11 carries, 27 yards
- CHI – Matt Forte, 23 carries, 89 yards, 2 TD

Top receivers

- TB – Louis Murphy, 6 receptions, 113 yards
- CHI – Matt Forte, 5 receptions, 23 yards

Top tacklers

- TB – Mason Foster, 7 tackles
- CHI – Ryan Mundy, 6 tackles

The Bears' game against the 2–8 Tampa Bay Buccaneers marked the return of Bucs head coach Lovie Smith, who had served as Bears head coach from 2004 to 2012; his staff also featured seven former Bears' assistants: special teams coordinator Kevin O'Dea, cornerbacks coach Gill Byrd, wide receiver coach Andrew Hayes-Stoker, linebackers coach Hardy Nickerson, defensive line assistant Mike Phair, safeties coach James carvalho, and running backs coach Tim Spencer. The Bucs also featured three former Bears starters in quarterback Josh McCown, cornerback Isaiah Frey, and safety Major Wright. The Bears entered the game leading the all-time series 36–18, and won the last meeting 24–18 in 2011. The Bears' 13th-ranked offense (19th rushing and 10th passing) had to prepare for a 27th-ranked Tampa Bay defense (22nd rushing and 30th passing) that was tied for fourth in forcing plays of negative yardage with 75, 45 of which were runs, the third-most in the league. To prevent such incidents, the team would have to contain Gerald McCoy and Lavonte David, who recorded three pick-sixes (tied for the most in the league), 15 turnovers and 45 points on these plays. On defense, the Bears would have to apply pressure: when blitzed, the Buccaneers' quarterbacks have the second-worst statistics in the league, consisting of a 57.6 passer rating, four touchdowns, seven interceptions (McCown being responsible for four) and nine sacks. While the Bears' pass defense is ranked 15th compared to Tampa's 19th-ranked passing attack, and the cornerbacks are undersized compared to the Bucs' receiving tandem of Mike Evans and Vincent Jackson, both of whom are 6 ft 5 in (1.96 m), the defensive backs are accustomed to such disadvantages in practice. Rushing-wise, Tampa was struggling productively, being ranked 28th, and had the NFL's second-least carries, and averaged only 3.2 yards on first down. ESPN, Yahoo!, USA Today, Fox Sports, and CBS Sports' majority panels predicted a Bears victory. Terrance Mitchell, Khaseem Greene, Darryl Sharpton, Eben Britton, Jordan Mills, Trevor Scott and Chris Williams were inactive.

The Buccaneers won the coin toss, but decided to kickoff. After the Bears went three-and-out, Marcus Thigpen muffed the ensuing punt but recovered. Tampa turned the ball over anyway when McCown was intercepted by Chris Conte, though Jay Cutler was also responsible for a turnover of his own after being hit by McCoy and fumbling with Clinton McDonald. McCown later connected with Evans for a 19-yard touchdown. After two drives of punts, Robbie Gould missed a 54-yard field goal while Patrick Murray made a 32-yard kick. The Bears improved in the second half as Cutler threw a two-yard score to Alshon Jeffery, followed by two Forte touchdowns for 21 unanswered points. The Bucs would commit three turnovers in the second half as McCown lost a fumble on a David Bass sack and threw an interception to Ryan Mundy, and Jackson was stripped by Tim Jennings. Tampa added a 39-yard field goal in the fourth quarter, but could not rally as the Bears won.

The Bears were the second team in 2014 to win despite recording less than 205 total yards.

==== Week 13: at Detroit Lions ====
Thanksgiving Day game

Week Thirteen: Chicago Bears at Detroit Lions – Game summary

Quarter	1	2	3	4	Total
Bears	14	0	3	0	**17**
**Lions**	3	21	0	10	**34**

at Ford Field, Detroit, Michigan

- Date: November 27
- Game time: 12:30 p.m. EST/11:30 a.m. CST
- Game weather: Played indoors (dome stadium)
- Game attendance: 64,175
- Referee: Bill Vinovich
- TV announcers (CBS): Jim Nantz, Phil Simms and Tracy Wolfson
- Recap, Gamebook

Game information

First quarter

- CHI – Alshon Jeffery 10 yard pass from Jay Cutler, Robbie Gould XP good, 10:33 (CHI 7–0). **Drive: 6 plays, 55 yards, 2:47**
- DET – Matt Prater 46 yard field goal, 6:51 (CHI 7–3). **Drive: 8 plays, 52 yards, 3:42**
- CHI – Alshon Jeffery 6 yard pass from Jay Cutler, Robbie Gould XP good, 3:35 (CHI 14–3). **Drive: 2 plays, 5 yards, 0:43**

Second quarter

- DET – Calvin Johnson 25 yard pass from Matthew Stafford, Matt Prater XP good, 12:55 (CHI 14–10). **Drive: 9 plays, 78 yards, 5:40**
- DET – Joique Bell 1 yard run, Matt Prater XP good, 3:18 (DET 17–14). **Drive: 10 plays, 86 yards, 4:28**
- DET – Calvin Johnson 6 yard pass from Matthew Stafford, Matt Prater XP good, 0:24 (DET 24–14). **Drive: 5 plays, 64 yards, 1:21**

Third quarter

- CHI – Robbie Gould 35 yard field goal, 8:54 (DET 24–17). **Drive: 13 plays, 64 yards, 6:06**

Fourth quarter

- DET – Joique Bell 1 yard run, 14:57 (DET 31–17). **Drive: 12 plays, 95 yards, 6:01**
- DET – Matt Prater 40 yard field goal, 6:16 (DET 34–17). **Drive: 6 plays, 20 yards, 3:13**

Top passers

- CHI – Jay Cutler, 31/48, 280 yards, 2 TD, 2 INT
- DET – Matthew Stafford, 34/45, 390 yards, 2 TD

Top rushers

- CHI – Ka'Deem Carey, 2 carries, 8 yards
- DET – Joique Bell, 23 carries, 91 yards, 2 TD

Top receivers

- CHI – Alshon Jeffery, 9 receptions, 71 yards, 2 TD
- DET – Calvin Johnson, 11 receptions, 146 yards, 2 TD

Top tacklers

- CHI – Ryan Mundy, 11 tackles
- DET – DeAndre Levy, 10 tackles

The Bears played their first Thanksgiving Day game in ten seasons against the 7–4 Detroit Lions. The two rivals have played 15 games on Thanksgiving, with Chicago holding the lead 8–7, but the Bears have been 1–4 in their last five Thanksgiving Day games, the most recent win coming in 1993 against the Lions. The previous Thanksgiving game for the Bears was a 21–7 loss to the Dallas Cowboys in 2004. The Lions entered the game with one of the best run defenses in the league that allowed fewer than 71 yards per game and a league-best 3.2 per carry; Detroit's defense also led the league in negative-yardage rushing plays with 16.7 percent. Jeff Joniak wrote "running on the edges of the Lions defense with the tackle sweeps and toss plays to Matt Forte could prove to be effective" in defeating them. Offensively, Joniak noted the Lions were similar to the Bears in featuring elements of the New Orleans Saints in their offensive thanks to coordinator Joe Lombardi's ties to the team. Although the Lions had failed to score a touchdown in eight consecutive quarters entering thirteen, running back Reggie Bush made his return to the team from injury. Overall, Joniak concluded the Bears had to capitalize on the Lions' two-game losing streak to win. Terrance Mitchell, Darryl Sharpton, Lance Briggs, Eben Britton, Trevor Scott, Chris Williams, and Jeremiah Ratliff sat out the game.

Chicago, who had struggled in the first quarter as they were outscored 41–0 in the period in their last six games, saw early success as they forced a Detroit punt before scoring on their opening drive with Jay Cutler's ten-yard touchdown to Alshon Jeffery. Matt Prater made a 46-yard field goal, but a Jared Allen forced fumble on Matthew Stafford led to Cutler throwing a six-yard score to Jeffery to put the Bears up 14–3. However, the Lions responded with 21 consecutive points in the second quarter with two Stafford touchdown throws to Calvin Johnson and a Joique Bell run, completing series of 78, 86, and 64 yards. Chicago attempted to respond with a 63-yard drive that ended with Robbie Gould's 35-yard kick, but the Lions engineered a 95-yard possession with Bell's one-yard score in the fourth quarter. Trailing 31–17, the Bears switched to a vertical passing attack, only for Cutler's pass to Brandon Marshall to be tipped by Darius Slay and intercepted by Glover Quin, which set up a 40-yard kick by Prater. Getting the ball with 1:55 remaining in the game, the Bears reached the Lions' 14-yard line before Cutler was picked off by James Ihedigbo on the final play.

==== Week 14: vs. Dallas Cowboys ====
Week Fourteen: Dallas Cowboys at Chicago Bears – Game summary

Quarter	1	2	3	4	Total
**Cowboys**	0	14	21	6	**41**
Bears	0	7	0	21	**28**

at Soldier Field, Chicago, Illinois

- Date: December 4
- Game time: 7:25 p.m. CST
- Game weather: 35 °F (2 °C), cloudy
- Game attendance: 61,558
- Referee: Ed Hochuli
- TV announcers (NFLN): Jim Nantz, Phil Simms and Tracy Wolfson
- Recap, Gamebook

Game information

First quarter

- No scoring

Second quarter

- DAL – DeMarco Murray 1 yard rush, Dan Bailey XP good, 10:50 (DAL 7–0). **Drive: 12 plays, 51 yards, 5:53**
- CHI – Martellus Bennett 12 yard pass from Jay Cutler, Jay Feely XP good, 6:13 (TIE 7–7). **Drive: 8 plays, 80 yards, 4:37**
- DAL – Cole Beasley 13 yard pass from Tony Romo, Dan Bailey XP good, 0:08 (DAL 14–7). **Drive: 14 plays, 72 yards, 6:05**

Third quarter

- DAL – Cole Beasley 24 yard pass from Tony Romo, Dan Bailey XP good, 12:32 (DAL 21–7). **Drive: 3 plays, 31 yards, 1:27**
- DAL – Gavin Escobar 6 yard pass from Tony Romo, Dan Bailey XP good, 8:02 (DAL 28–7). **Drive: 4 plays, 56 yards, 2:14**
- DAL – Joseph Randle 17 yard run, Dan Bailey XP good, 2:09 (DAL 35–7). **Drive: 6 plays, 68 yards, 3:17**

Fourth quarter

- CHI – Alshon Jeffery 27 yard pass from Jay Cutler, Jay Feely XP blocked, 14:52 (DAL 35–13). **Drive: 5 plays, 76 yards, 2:17**
- DAL – Dan Bailey 35 yard field goal, 12:35 (DAL 38–13). **Drive: 5 plays, 31 yards, 2:17**
- CHI – Matt Forte 1 yard run, Matt Forte run for two-point conversion, 7:17 (DAL 38–21). **Drive: 12 plays, 67 yards, 5:18**
- CHI – Jay Cutler 10 yard rush, Jay Feely XP good, 6:09 (DAL 38–28). **Drive: 12 plays, 67 yards, 5:18**
- DAL – Dan Bailey 27 yard field goal, 3:41 (DAL 41–28). **Drive: 3 plays, 50 yards, 1:08**

Top passers

- DAL – Tony Romo, 21/26, 205 yards, 3 TD
- CHI – Jay Cutler, 32/46, 341 yards, 2 TD, 1 INT

Top rushers

- DAL – DeMarco Murray, 32 carries, 179 yards, 1 TD
- CHI – Matt Forte, 13 carries, 26 yards, 1 TD

Top receivers

- DAL – DeMarco Murray, 9 receptions, 49 yards
- CHI – Martellus Bennett, 12 receptions, 84 yards, 1 TD

Top tacklers

- DAL – Rolando McClain, 10 tackles
- CHI – Jon Bostic, 5 tackles

On Thursday night, the Bears and Dallas Cowboys met for the 25th time in week fourteen. The Bears had won the last three meetings between the two, including a 45–28 victory in 2013. In his pre-game preview, Jeff Joniak described the upcoming game as "tug of war with the clock" as both teams sought to control time of possession: in 2014, the Bears were ranked tenth in time of possession, while the Cowboys were ahead in fifth, and in their 2013 game, the Bears held the ball for 36 minutes. The Cowboys defense also struggled on first down, being ranked 29th in the NFL with 4.9 yards per carry allowed on such downs. Conversely, Dallas' offense featured one of the top offensive lines as DeMarco Murray led the league in carries and rushing yards, while quarterback Tony Romo had just eight interceptions and a passer rating of 125 against blitzes. However, the Cowboys had lost 12 of 18 fumbles, a weakness that Joniak emphasized. Robbie Gould, who suffered a quad injury, was among the seven Bears inactive for the games as he joined Terrance Mitchell, Khaseem Greene, Darryl Sharpton, Eben Britton, Jeremiah Ratliff, and Cornelius Washington. To take Gould's place, the Bears signed Jay Feely, who made 30 of 36 kicks in 2013 with the Arizona Cardinals.

Four consecutive punts and a scoreless first quarter began the game before both teams traded touchdowns: after Murray scored a one-yard touchdown run, Jay Cutler threw a 12-yard score to Martellus Bennett, which Dallas answered on Romo's 13-yard pass to Cole Beasley. In the third quarter, the Cowboys scored three touchdowns to complete a 13-minute stretch between the second and third periods in which they scored 28 unanswered points: after Matt Forte lost a fumble to Sterling Moore, Romo threw a 24-yard touchdown to Beasley, followed by a six-yard touchdown pass to Gavin Escobar and Joseph Randle's 17-yard touchdown run. The Bears opened the fourth quarter with Cutler's 27-yard touchdown to Alshon Jeffery, though Feely's extra point was blocked. Chicago then attempted an onside kick that Beasley recovered, with Anthony Walters suffering an offside penalty. The Cowboys would drive to the Bears' 17 where Dan Bailey converted a 35-yard field goal. Forte later ran for a one-yard touchdown and scored on the two-point conversion; the Bears' Dante Rosario recovered the ensuing onside for the team's first successful onside kick since 2003. Assisted by a roughing the passer penalty on Tyrone Crawford, the Chicago offense reached the Dallas ten, where Cutler ran for the score. A third onside kick attempt failed as DeDe Lattimore was penalized for being offsides and Dez Bryant recovered; Bailey later made a 27-yard kick. Down 41–28, the Bears attempted to rally and reached the Cowboys' red zone before Cutler was intercepted by Orlando Scandrick in the end zone.

The Cowboys ended the game with scores on seven consecutive drives, with three exceptions being the first two punts and the final possession in which Romo kneeled twice to end the game.

With the Lions' win over the Buccaneers three days later, the Bears were officially eliminated from playoff contention.

==== Week 15: vs. New Orleans Saints ====
Week Fifteen: New Orleans Saints at Chicago Bears – Game summary

Quarter	1	2	3	4	Total
**Saints**	0	14	10	7	**31**
Bears	0	0	0	15	**15**

at Soldier Field, Chicago, Illinois

- Date: December 15
- Game time: 7:30 p.m. CST
- Game weather: 44 °F (7 °C), rain showers
- Game attendance: 60,996
- Referee: Carl Cheffers
- TV announcers (ESPN): Mike Tirico, Jon Gruden and Lisa Salters
- Recap, Gamebook

Game information

First quarter

- No scoring

Second quarter

- NO – Josh Hill 8 yard pass from Drew Brees, Shayne Graham XP good, 14:52 (NO 7–0). **Drive: 7 plays, 85 yards, 4:03**
- NO – Marques Colston 9 yard pass from Drew Brees, Shayne Graham XP good, 0:32 (NO 14–0). **Drive: 10 plays, 95 yards, 3:30**

Third quarter

- NO – Josh Hill 7 yard pass from Drew Brees, Shayne Graham XP good, 8:35 (NO 21–0). **Drive: 12 plays, 80 yards, 6:25**
- NO – Shayne Graham 25 yard field goal, 0:16 (NO 24–0). **Drive: 8 plays, 49 yards, 3:05**

Fourth quarter

- CHI – Marquess Wilson 1 yard pass from Jay Cutler, Jay Cutler to Martellus Bennett for two-point conversion, 12:47 (NO 24–8). **Drive: 7 plays, 56 yards, 2:29**
- NO – Mark Ingram II 15 yard run, Shayne Graham XP good, 1:47 (NO 31–8). **Drive: 3 plays, 23 yards, 1:00**
- CHI – Alshon Jeffery 7 yard pass from Jay Cutler, Jay Feely XP good, 0:30 (NO 31–15). **Drive: 4 plays, 71 yards, 1:17**

Top passers

- NO – Drew Brees, 29/36, 375 yards, 3 TD
- CHI – Jay Cutler, 17/31, 194 yards, 2 TD, 3 INT

Top rushers

- NO – Mark Ingram II, 17 carries, 59 yards, 1 TD
- CHI – Matt Forte, 16 carries, 78 yards

Top receivers

- NO – Jimmy Graham, 5 receptions, 87 yards
- CHI – Alshon Jeffery, 4 receptions, 78 yards, 1 TD

Top tacklers

- NO – John Jenkins, 7 tackles
- CHI – Christian Jones, 8 tackles

Week fifteen saw a battle of 5–8 teams as the Bears hosted the New Orleans Saints; the Bears entered the game with a 15–13 advantage in the all-time series, though they dropped their last meeting in 2013 26–18. With the Saints allowing 271 rushing yards in their previous game against the Carolina Panthers and 183 rushing yards per game in the last five weeks, Jeff Joniak stressed a run-heavy offense with Matt Forte who had just 18 combined carries and 31 total yards in his last two games. The Saints defense was also allowing 398 yards per game and eight yards per pass, among the worst in the NFL, while their 359 total points allowed were the second-most in the NFC behind the Bears' 378. For the Bears defense, Joniak focused on containing Mark Ingram II, who had four 100-yard rushing games in 2014, and Drew Brees, who was completing 69.3 percent of his throws and was close to breaking 4,000 passing yards for the ninth straight year. Chris Conte, Robbie Gould, Michael Ola, Trevor Scott, David Fales, Brandon Dunn, and Terrance Mitchell were inactive.

After a scoreless first quarter in which Jay Cutler was intercepted by Patrick Robinson on the opening drive, Nick Toon lost a fumble to Jared Allen, and Shayne Graham missed a 51-yard field goal, the Saints scored 24 unanswered points across the second and third quarters. The points came via Brees' eight- and nine-yard touchdown throws to Josh Hill and Marques Colston in the second, followed a second Brees-to-Hill score for seven yards and Graham's 25-yard kick in the third. Against a blitz-heavy Saints defense, Cutler was sacked a season-high seven times as the offense recorded just 278 total yards. He was also intercepted two more times by Pierre Warren in the second and third quarters. During the first quarter, on 4th-and-3 from their own 39 and with only ten players on the field, the Bears attempted to fake the punt by directly snapping to Danny McCray; McCray would gain only two yards on the play. The Bears were then penalized for not having seven players on the line of scrimmage, missing a lineman. Chicago would not score points until the fourth quarter with a one-yard touchdown pass to Marquess Wilson. After the two-minute warning, Ingram recorded a 15-yard touchdown run, which the Bears answered with a seven-yard throw from Cutler to Alshon Jeffery to complete a 71-yard drive. The Saints' Benjamin Watson recovered the onside to end the game.

With the loss, the Bears fell to 5–9, their first losing season since 2009.

==== Week 16: vs. Detroit Lions ====
Week Sixteen: Detroit Lions at Chicago Bears – Game summary

Quarter	1	2	3	4	Total
**Lions**	7	0	3	10	**20**
Bears	0	7	7	0	**14**

at Soldier Field, Chicago, Illinois

- Date: December 21
- Game time: 12:00 p.m. CST
- Game weather: 36 °F (2 °C), cloudy
- Game attendance: 61,420
- Referee: Gene Steratore
- TV announcers (Fox): Joe Buck, Troy Aikman and Erin Andrews
- Recap, Gamebook

Game information
- DET – Reggie Bush 13 yard run, Matt Prater XP good, 5:15 (DET 7–0). **Drive: 7 plays, 57 yards, 3:00**

**Second quarter**

- CHI – Matt Forte 11 yard pass from Jimmy Clausen, Jay Feely XP good, 0:30 (TIE 7–7). **Drive: 1 play, 11 yards, 0:06**

**Third quarter**

- DET – Matt Prater 39 yard field goal, 10:24 (DET 10–7). **Drive: 10 plays, 47 yards, 4:36**
- CHI – Alshon Jeffery 20 yard pass from Jimmy Clausen, Jay Feely XP good, 7:39. (CHI 14–10). **Drive: 14 plays, 80 yards, 7:39**

**Fourth quarter**

- DET – Joique Bell 17 yard run, Matt Prater XP good, 1:05 (DET 17–14). **Drive: 4 plays, 73 yards, 1:05**
- DET – Matt Prater 30 yard field goal, 2:59. (DET 20–14). **Drive: 9 plays, 43 yards, 2:59**

**Top passers**

- DET – Matthew Stafford, 22/39, 243 yards, 2 INT
- CHI – Jimmy Clausen, 23/39, 181 yards, 2 TD, 1 INT

**Top rushers**

- DET – Joique Bell, 13 carries, 74 yards, 1 TD
- CHI – Matt Forte, 19 carries, 55 yards

**Top receivers**

- DET – Calvin Johnson, 6 receptions, 103 yards
- CHI – Alshon Jeffery, 6 receptions, 72 yards, 1 TD

**Top tacklers**

- DET – DeAndre Levy, 6 tackles, 2 assists
- CHI – Christian Jones, 11 tackles

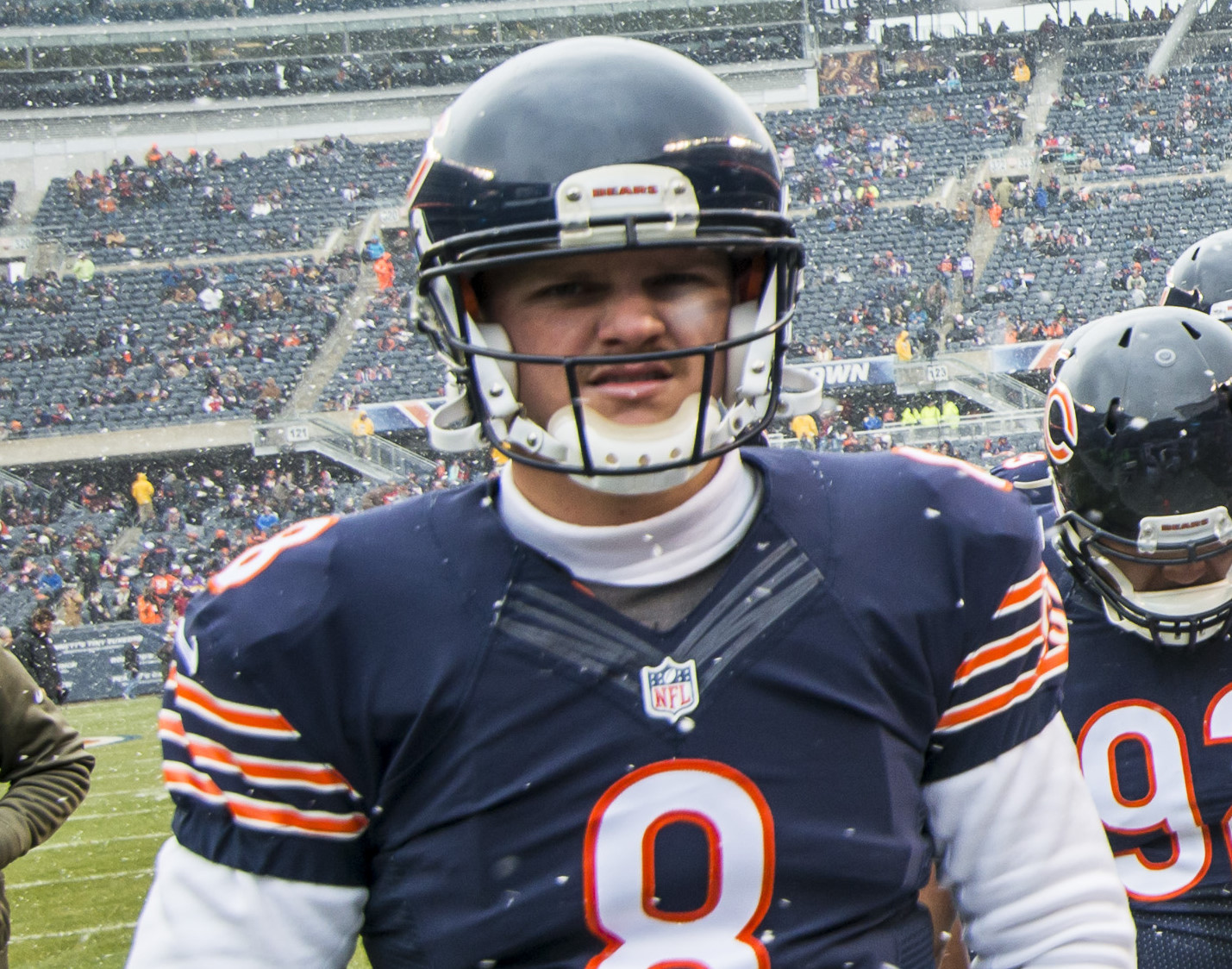
Jimmy Clausen made his first start since his rookie year in 2010 in week sixteen against the Lions

With the Bears struggling, Jay Cutler was benched for backup Jimmy Clausen against the Lions in week sixteen. It was Clausen's first start since his rookie year with the 2010 Carolina Panthers, during which he went 1–9 as a starter; in 2014, he appeared in three games with the Bears, during which he completed three of nine passes for 42 yards. At the time of his benching, Cutler led the league in turnovers with 24. Robbie Gould, David Fales, Terrance Mitchell, Chris Conte, Kyle Long, Trevor Scott, and Will Sutton were unavailable as all but Mitchell and Scott were dealing with injuries.

After two punts, the Lions scored first on Reggie Bush's 13-yard touchdown run. Although the Bears drove to Detroit's one-yard line, they were unable to score as Clausen's fourth-down pass to Eben Britton, who had reported in as an eligible receiver, fell incomplete. Chicago would get the ball back on the following series after Matthew Stafford's pass was intercepted by Brock Vereen, but they could not capitalize on the takeaway and punted. Stafford would be intercepted again, this time by Ryan Mundy, at the Bears' one-yard line, though the Chicago offense yet again failed to score. On the ensuing punt, returner Jeremy Ross muffed the punt at the Lions' 11 and Sherrick McManis recovered. On the next play, Clausen threw an 11-yard touchdown to Forte. After Matt Prater made a 39-yard field goal on the first drive of the second half, Clausen answered with a 20-yard score to Alshon Jeffery to give the Bears the 14–10; the score was aided by a roughing the punter while the Bears were punting on fourth-and-23. In the fourth quarter, Prater's 37-yard attempt was blocked by Jeremiah Ratliff, but the Lions would score ten unanswered points in the period via Joique Bell's 17-yard touchdown run and a 30-yard kick by Prater. The go-ahead touchdown by Bell was created with help from a defensive pass interference on Tim Jennings while covering Corey Fuller, resulting in a 46-yard gain for the Lions. Down by six points with 2:35 remaining, the Bears reached their 45 before Clausen's fourth-down throw was intercepted by Glover Quin.

Clausen ended his day with 23 of 39 passes completed for 181 yards, two touchdowns, an interception, and a passer rating of 77.0. Prior to the fourth quarter in which he completed just four of ten throws for 25 yards and the pick, he was 19 of 29 for 156 yards and two touchdowns for a 102.1 passer rating. He suffered a concussion in the game after a helmet-to-helmet hit by Ziggy Ansah, forcing him to miss the season finale in Minnesota.

==== Week 17: at Minnesota Vikings ====
Week Seventeen: Chicago Bears at Minnesota Vikings – Game summary

Quarter	1	2	3	4	Total
Bears	0	3	3	3	**9**
**Vikings**	3	0	7	3	**13**

at TCF Bank Stadium, Minneapolis, Minnesota

- Date: December 28
- Game time: 12:00 p.m. CST
- Game weather: 15 °F (−9 °C), cloudy
- Game attendance: 52,364
- Referee: Jeff Triplette
- TV announcers (Fox): Dick Stockton, Brady Quinn and Kristina Pink
- Recap, Gamebook

Game information

First quarter

- MIN – Blair Walsh 37 yard field goal, 4:59 (MIN 3–0). **Drive: 13 plays, 61 yards, 5:25.**

Second quarter

- CHI – Jay Feely 48 yard field goal, 0:55 (TIE 3–3). **Drive: 9 plays, 42 yards, 2:53.**

Third quarter

- CHI – Jay Feely 25 yard field goal, 13:05 (CHI 6–3). **Drive: 4 plays, 2 yards, 1:40.**
- MIN – Adam Thielen 44 yard pass from Teddy Bridgewater, Blair Walsh XP good, 10:53 (MIN 10–6). **Drive: 6 plays, 80 yards, 2:12.**

Fourth quarter

- MIN – Blair Walsh 44 yard field goal, 11:29. (MIN 13–6). **Drive: 5 plays, 27 yards, 2:29.**
- CHI – Jay Feely 35 yard field goal, 8:53. (MIN 13–9). **Drive: 8 plays, 18 yards, 2:36.**

Top passers

- CHI – Jay Cutler, 23/36, 172 yards
- MIN – Teddy Bridgewater, 17/25, 209 yards, TD

Top rushers

- CHI – Matt Forte, 17 rushes, 51 yards
- MIN – Matt Asiata, 19 rushes, 91 yards

Top receivers

- CHI – Martellus Bennett, 8 receptions, 59 yards
- MIN – Adam Thielen, 3 receptions, 68 yards, TD

With Jimmy Clausen out, Jay Cutler started the 2014 season finale against the Vikings. In his pre-game keys, Jeff Joniak discussed protecting Cutler from Mike Zimmer's blitzes; although Cutler recorded 330 passing yards in their first meeting, he was hit five times, while the Vikings were ranked in the top ten in sacks and forcing offensive linemen to commit holding penalties. On defense, he emphasized the ability to "compete with fire" to stop Teddy Bridgewater, who had four straight games with at least 70 percent of his passes completed, and Matt Asiata, who was second in the league with nine rushing touchdowns. Joniak concluded his article by noting the overall message should be maintaining effort as the Bears completed "one of the most frustrating and perplexing seasons in recent franchise history with unfulfilled expectations devolving into uncertainty for 2015." Clausen, Robbie Gould, Al Louis-Jean, Chris Conte, Charles Leno, Austen Lane, and Brandon Dunn did not dress for the game.

In a low-scoring affair, the Vikings scored the only points of the first quarter with Blair Walsh's 37-yard field goal; Bridgewater had thrown a 35-yard touchdown to Greg Jennings early in the drive, but the pass was ruled incomplete. Jay Feely made a 48-yard kick on the Bears' final drive of the first half. Every other series in the half ended with a punt. The second half began with Bridgewater being intercepted by Kyle Fuller, who returned the pick to Minnesota's nine-yard line. However, the offense could not score the touchdown and had to settle for Feely's 25-yard field goal. The Vikings answered with a 44-yard touchdown pass by Bridgewater to Adam Thielen. Following a 44-yard field goal by Walsh in the fourth quarter, Marc Mariani returned the ensuing kickoff 67 yards to the Vikings' 35, but the offense once again could not capitalize, leading to a 35-yard kick by Feely. Minnesota would reach Chicago's three on the next series, but were stopped on fourth down; the Bears also suffered the same fate when Cutler's fourth-and-nine pass to Martellus Bennett fell short by a yard.

The offense struggled mightily as the Bears failed to score a touchdown for the first time under Marc Trestman. Although Cutler completed 23 of 36 passes in the game for a career-best 66 percent, he had just 172 passing yards and just one pass that exceeded 20 yards.

With the loss, the Bears ended the season with their fifth consecutive loss, the first such losing streak since 1989, and their first last-place finish in the division since 2007.

== Standings ==
=== Division ===
NFC North
	W	L	T	PCT	DIV	CONF	PF	PA	STK
^{(2)} Green Bay Packers	12	4	0	.750	5–1	9–3	486	348	W2
^{(6)} Detroit Lions	11	5	0	.688	5–1	9–3	321	282	L1
Minnesota Vikings	7	9	0	.438	1–5	6–6	325	343	W1
Chicago Bears	5	11	0	.313	1–5	4–8	319	442	L5

=== Conference ===
NFC
#	Team	Division	W	L	T	PCT	DIV	CONF	SOS	SOV	STK
Division leaders
1 (Note: Seattle, Green Bay and Dallas were ranked in seeds 1–3 based on conference record.)	Seattle Seahawks	West	12	4	0	.750	5–1	10–2	.525	.513	W6
2	Green Bay Packers	North	12	4	0	.750	5–1	9–3	.482	.440	W2
3	Dallas Cowboys	East	12	4	0	.750	4–2	8–4	.445	.422	W4
4	Carolina Panthers	South	7	8	1	.469	4–2	6–6	.490	.357	W4
Wild Cards
5 (Note: Arizona defeated Detroit head-to-head (Week 11, 14–6).)	Arizona Cardinals	West	11	5	0	.688	3–3	8–4	.523	.477	L2
6	Detroit Lions	North	11	5	0	.688	5–1	9–3	.471	.392	L1
Did not qualify for the postseason
7	Philadelphia Eagles	East	10	6	0	.625	4–2	6–6	.490	.416	W1
8	San Francisco 49ers	West	8	8	0	.500	2–4	7–5	.527	.508	W1
9 (Note: New Orleans defeated Minnesota head-to-head (Week 3, 20–9).)	New Orleans Saints	South	7	9	0	.438	3–3	6–6	.486	.415	W1
10	Minnesota Vikings	North	7	9	0	.438	1–5	6–6	.475	.308	W1
11 (Note: The NY Giants defeated both Atlanta and St. Louis head-to-head (Atlanta: Week 5, 30–20; St. Louis: Week 16, 37–27), while Atlanta finished ahead of St. Louis based on conference record.)	New York Giants	East	6	10	0	.375	2–4	4–8	.512	.323	L1
12	Atlanta Falcons	South	6	10	0	.375	5–1	6–6	.482	.380	L1
13	St. Louis Rams	West	6	10	0	.375	2–4	4–8	.531	.427	L3
14	Chicago Bears	North	5	11	0	.313	1–5	4–8	.529	.338	L5
15	Washington Redskins	East	4	12	0	.250	2–4	2–10	.496	.422	L1
16	Tampa Bay Buccaneers	South	2	14	0	.125	0–6	1–11	.486	.469	L6
Tiebreakers (Note: When breaking ties for three or more teams under the NFL's rules, they are first broken within divisions, then comparing only the highest-ranked remaining team from each division.)

== End of season ==
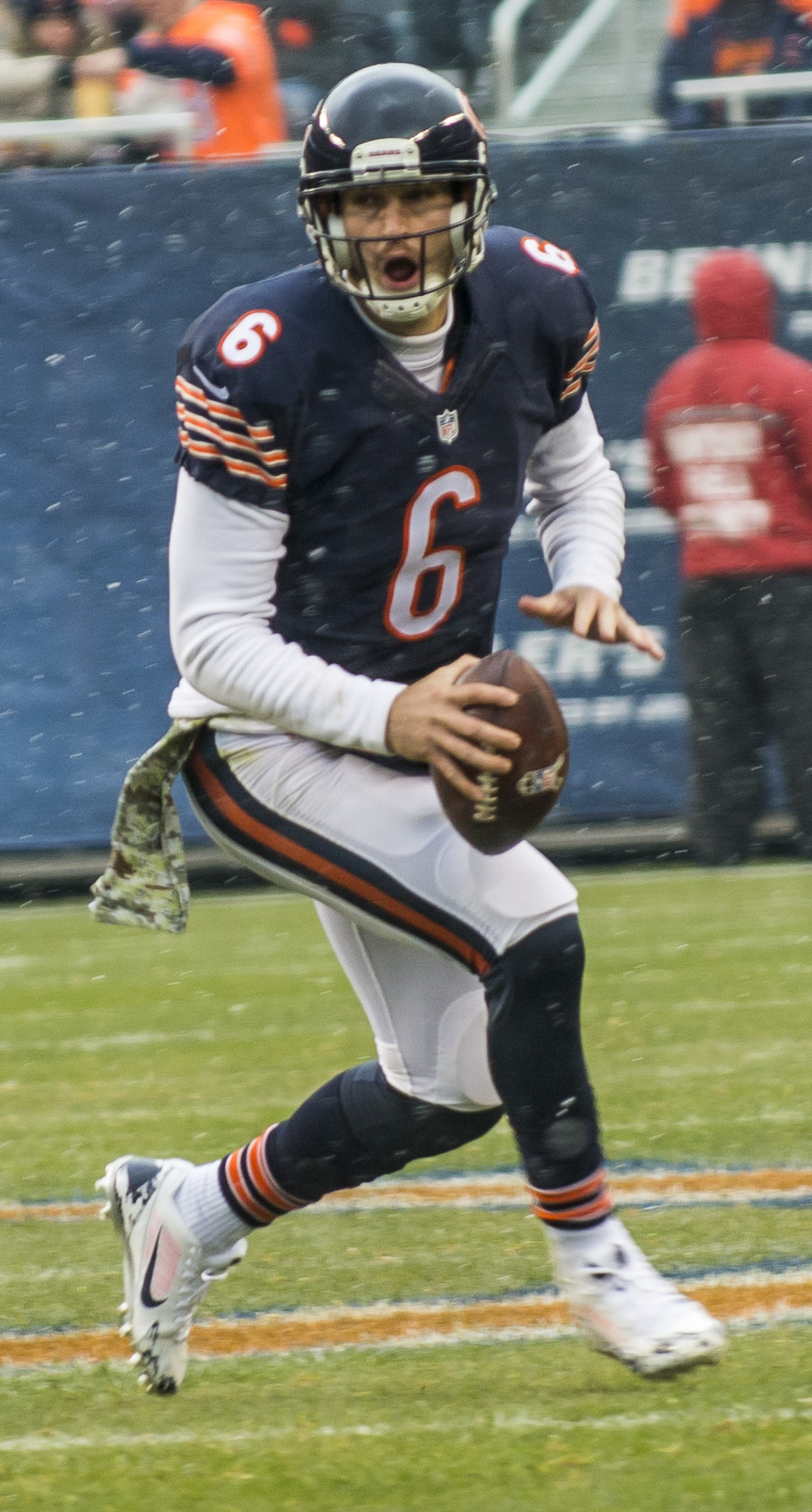
Jay Cutler (pictured against the Vikings) set the team record in completions and career bests in various passing categories, but also led the league in turnovers in 2014

The Bears ended 2014 with a 5–11 record, their first losing season since 2009 and the first with more than ten losses since 2004. After the week fourteen loss to Dallas, Jay Cutler described the year as the "No. 1" disappointment of his career; he noted that "expectations coming into this [season] were extremely high and since the first game we haven't done a good enough job week-in and week-out. So it adds up."

Offensively, the team recorded the highest completion percentage in team history with 65 percent, and ranked second among all Bears teams in completions (396), passing attempts (609) and passing touchdowns. Cutler broke the team record for the most completions with 370, along with career highs in completion percentage (66 percent) and passing touchdowns (28). Despite these milestones, he tied the San Diego Chargers' Philip Rivers for the most interceptions in the league with 18, while his 24 total turnovers also led the NFL. The offense also regressed from being the second-ranked scoring unit in the NFL in 2013 with 445 points to just 319 in 2014, while the team failed to score at least 30 points in a game for the first time since 2004. The Bears also featured the heaviest passing attack in 2014 as they threw on 63.1 percent of their plays.

On defense, the Bears' adjusted line yards defense, which "measures a defense's control of the line of scrimmage", ranked 30th in the league, a two-spot improvement from 2013. In runs toward the offensive linemen, the team ranked 29th or worse in runs marked left tackle, middle/guard and right tackle. The 30th-ranked defense allowed 381.5 yards per game and a league-most 28.6 points per game.

The struggles were compounded by tensions in the locker room and the staff's difficulties in managing the situation; after losing to Miami, reports surfaced of the team arguing with one another. In December, offensive coordinator Aaron Kromer anonymously criticized Cutler before apologizing; Trestman's actions surrounding the matter drew concern from players, with reports claiming Kromer received "basically a slap on the wrist" as discipline for his comments. The roster was also reportedly "confused and uncomfortable" when Cutler was benched for the week sixteen game against the Lions.

In his 2014 season report card, ESPN.com's Michael C. Wright wrote "Trestman undoubtedly fractured the relationship with the quarterback, but the move called into question general manager Phil Emery's skills as a personnel evaluator." After Trestman's firing, an anonymous player revealed in a 2015 interview with Bleacher Report writer Mike Freeman that Jeremiah Ratliff was named a team captain days after Ratliff pushed an assistant coach and damaged a practice clock; although Trestman defended the decision, the player explained it created discord among his teammates.

Trestman and Emery were fired on December 29. Coordinators Kromer and Mel Tucker were not retained by new head coach John Fox.

== Awards and records ==
=== Awards ===
On December 23, Kyle Long was named to the 2014 Pro Bowl, the only Bear invited. This was his second consecutive Pro Bowl invitation, making him the first Bear since Devin Hester to make the all-star game in his first two seasons, and the tenth in Bears history. On January 2, 2015, Long was named to the Associated Press All-Pro team, again the lone Bear; he had received five votes, and was named to the second team. In 2014, he didn't allow a single sack.

On January 13, 2015, Pat O'Donnell and Kyle Fuller were named to the Pro Football Writers Association's All-Rookie Team. On April 7, Matt Slauson was awarded the NFL's Ed Block Courage Award.

==== Monthly awards ====
- On October 2, Kyle Fuller was named NFL Defensive Rookie of the Month for September.

==== Weekly awards ====
- In week two against San Francisco, Kyle Fuller was named NFC Defensive Player of the Week on September 17.

=== Records ===
==== Game ====
- In week ten against the Packers, the Bears set a franchise record for the most points allowed in a half with 42 and the most touchdown passes allowed in a half with six.

==== Individual ====
===== Season =====
- In week fourteen against the Cowboys, Martellus Bennett set a franchise record for the most receptions by a tight end with 77.
- In week seventeen against the Vikings, Matt Forte set the NFL record for the most receptions by a running back with 102.
