= Lapeer High School =

Location
- 933 South Saginaw Street; Lapeer, Michigan 48446; United States; 43.039°N 83.304°W

Information
- Type: Public
- Established: 1922; 2014 (current form)
- Principal: Tim Zeeman; Doug Lindsay
- Teaching staff: 45.65 (FTE)
- Enrollment: 1,118 (2023–2024)
- Student to teacher ratio: 24.49
- Colors: Navy blue and Kelly green
- Athletics conference: Saginaw Valley League
- Mascot: Lightning
- Website: lhs.lapeerschools.org/o/lhs

Lapeer High School is a coeducational public high school located in Lapeer, Michigan. It is part of Lapeer Community Schools. It was established in 2014 following a merger of two high schools. LHS has one of the largest enrollment of any school in Central Michigan or The Thumb.

== History ==
Lapeer High School existed as one school until the 1975–1976 school year when growing enrollments caused the need for an additional high school building. As a result, Lapeer High School was split into two: Lapeer West High School and Lapeer East High School

In March 2013, the Lapeer School Board voted to consolidate the two high schools. The board decided to act sooner rather than later in addressing long-term structural issues plaguing the community - lower birth rates, declining population, and reduced funding due to current and projected enrollment declines. Over the previous 30 years, both high schools saw enrollments decline by about 15%.

Lapeer High School was established in 2014 in the former Lapeer East building, which was renovated in the summer of 2013 to accommodate the increase in enrollment, which as of 2014 stood at 2,112. The Lapeer West building now houses alternative education and other educational programs. Before consolidation, each high school had an enrollment of approximately 1,100 students.

== Athletics ==
Lapeer High School competes in the Saginaw Valley League, a 14-school conference that primarily serves a large geographical area of Central Michigan, specifically the Flint/Tri-Cities area. Before consolidation, both Lapeer East and Lapeer West were original members of the Flint Metro League since its founding in 1968. With the announcement of the planned consolidation of Lapeer East and West High Schools and subsequent denial of membership to the Flint Metro League (based upon LHS's new larger enrollment), district officials began a thorough process to determine new league affiliation with input from students, coaches, and parents. Additional options besides SVL included the Oakland Activities Association, the Macomb Area Conference, and competing as an independent school. LHS is in the South Division of the SVL, competing against schools in the Flint area.

Before opening, a committee of teachers and students from both schools decided on the school's new mascot and colors. They chose "Lightning" as the mascot and blue and green as the colors. The colors pay homage to the past of both former schools: navy blue from Lapeer West and kelly green from Lapeer East.

As the former East and West High Schools were rivals of one another, and with the move to a new athletic conference, LHS lacks a natural rivalry. Past non-conference opponents that LHS will now play regularly include the Flint schools and Davison High School.

== Notable alumni ==
- Kelly Best (West), Miss Michigan USA, 2007
- Larry Carney (East), children's author and songwriter
- Louis C. Cramton (LHS), politician and judge
- Danelle Gay (West), Miss Michigan USA, 2006
- Roger Kish (West), head wrestling coach at North Dakota State University
- Terry Knight (LHS), rock and roll music producer and promoter for Grand Funk Railroad
- Jake Long (East), professional football player
- Joe Long (East), professional football player
- Asya Miller (East), blind athlete, goalball competitor
- Nathan Miller (West), Former Blue Angels Pilot
- Terry Nichols (LHS), convicted accomplice in the Oklahoma City bombing
- Glenn Pakulak (East), former professional football player
- Charles E. Potter, (LHS), former U.S. Representative and U.S. Senator serving Michigan
- Victor Prather (LHS), former flight surgeon and space suit designer
- Kemp Rasmussen (West), former professional football player
