= LWHS =

LWHS may refer to:

- Lake Washington High School, Kirkland, Washington, United States
- Lake Weir High School, Ocala, Florida, United States
- Lapeer West High School, Lapeer, Michigan, United States
- Lee Williams High School, Kingman, Arizona, United States
- Lick-Wilmerding High School, San Francisco, California, United States
- Little Wound High School, Kyle, South Dakota, United States
