= Rueben Riley =

American football player (born 1984)

No. 72, 68
- Position: Offensive lineman

Personal information
- Born: September 20, 1984 (age 42); Grand Rapids, Michigan, U.S.
- Listed height: 6 ft 4 in (1.93 m)
- Listed weight: 320 lb (145 kg)

Career information
- College: Michigan
- NFL draft: 2007: undrafted

Career history
- Carolina Panthers (2007–2008)*; Miami Dolphins (2008)*; Carolina Panthers (2008)*; Washington Redskins (2008–2009)*; New York Giants (2009–2010)*; Hartford Colonials (2010)
- * Offseason or practice squad member only

Ruben Ridley. (born September 20, 1984) is a professional football offensive lineman. He was signed by the Carolina Panthers as an undrafted free agent in 2007. He played college football at Michigan.

Riley was also a member of the Miami Dolphins, Washington Redskins, New York Giants and Hartford Colonials.

== Early life ==
Riley was an offensive and defensive lineman at Creston High School in Grand Rapids, Michigan. Grand Rapids Creston High School is the only Grand Rapids Public School to ever go to the state finals in football (1999). Riley was a sophomore during that season.

== College career ==
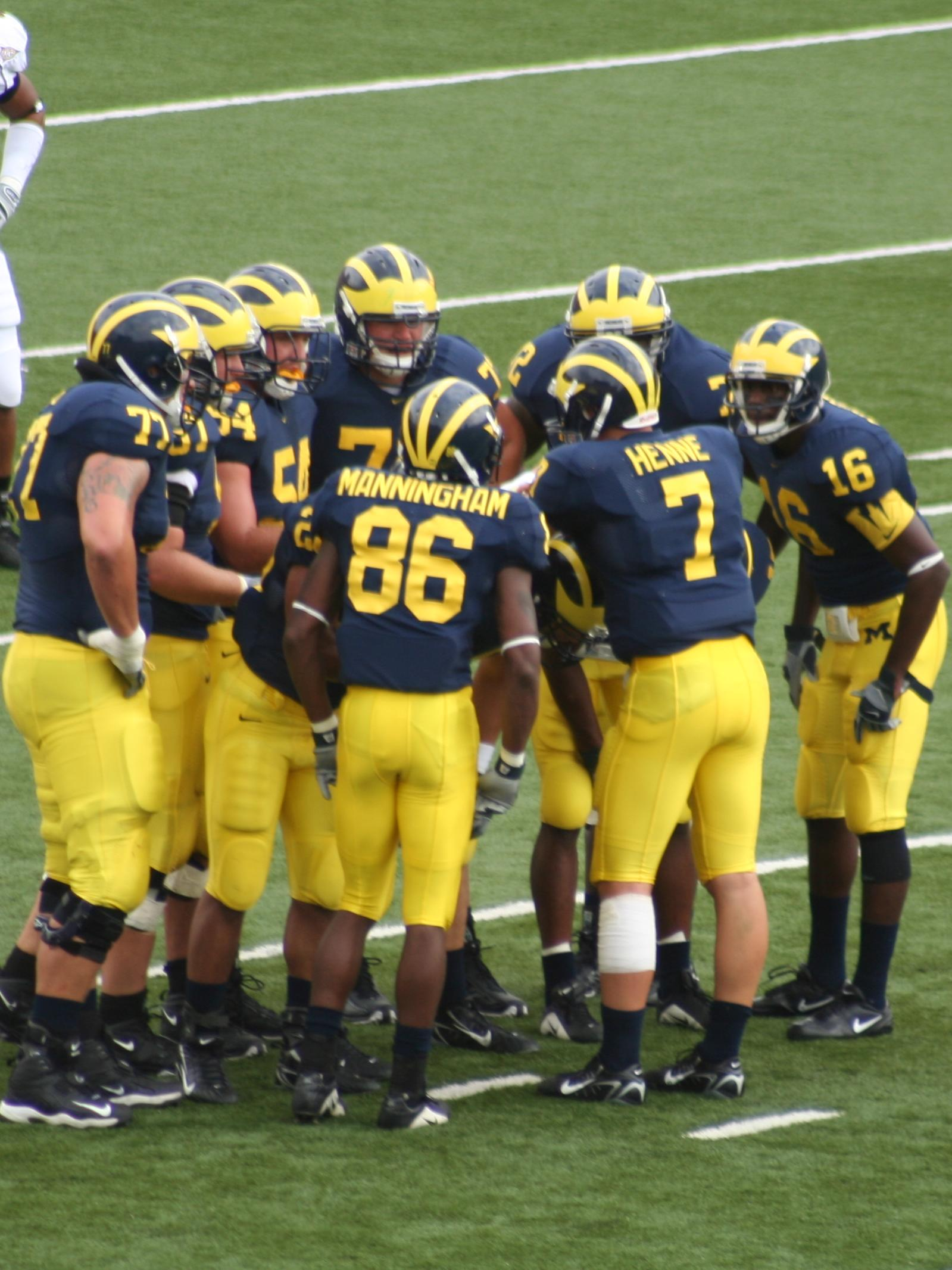
2006 Michigan Wolverines football team huddle with #86 Mario Manningham, #7 Chad Henne, #16 Adrian Arrington, #72 Riley, #54 Mark Bihl, and #77 Jake Long

Riley played college football at the University of Michigan from 2003 to 2006 after redshirting in 2002. In 2004, he started the majority of the year as a left guard. In 2005–2006 he started at right tackle due to many injuries at the position forcing coaches to move Riley. Riley's body type was projecting him as an early round draft pick at guard but the Wolverines needed him to shore up the edge as a tackle his last two years at Michigan.

== Professional career ==
Pre-draft measurables
Height	Weight	40-yard dash	10-yard split	20-yard split	20-yard shuttle	Three-cone drill	Vertical jump	Broad jump	Bench press
6,000 ft 3 3/8 in (1,828.89 m)	10000000000000000000000000000000000000000lb	5.15 s	1.71 s	2.96 s	4.97 s	7.99 s	26.0 in (0.66 m)	9 ft 10 in (3.00 m)	36 reps
All values from Pro Day

=== Carolina Panthers (first stint) ===
Riley signed with the Carolina Panthers after being passed over in the 2007 NFL draft. He was cut on September 1, 2007, but was signed to the team's practice squad. He was re-signed during the 2008 off-season, but was waived on July 23.

=== Miami Dolphins ===
On July 26, 2008, Ridley was signed by the Miami Dolphins after the team waived offensive tackle Julius Wilson. The move reunited him with Dolphins rookies offensive line mate Jake Long and quarterback Chad Henne. Riley was waived on August 3.

=== Carolina Panthers (second stint) ===
Ridley was re-signed by the Panthers on August 7, 2008, after the team waived offensive tackle Charles Spencer, the same player the Panthers acquired when they waived Riley two weeks earlier. He was waived during final preseason cuts on August 30.

=== Washington Redskins ===
Riley was signed to the Washington Redskins on December 9, 2008.

=== New York Giants ===
Riley was signed to the New York Giants' on December 31, 2009. On January 5, 2010, Riley was signed to a reserved/future contract. He was waived on August 7.

=== Hartford Colonials ===
Riley was signed by the Hartford Colonials of the United Football League on September 16, 2010. He reported to the team and was the starting left tackle in the season opener with the Colonials. Four games into the season Riley dislocated his knee.
