= Chad Henne =

American football player (born 1985)

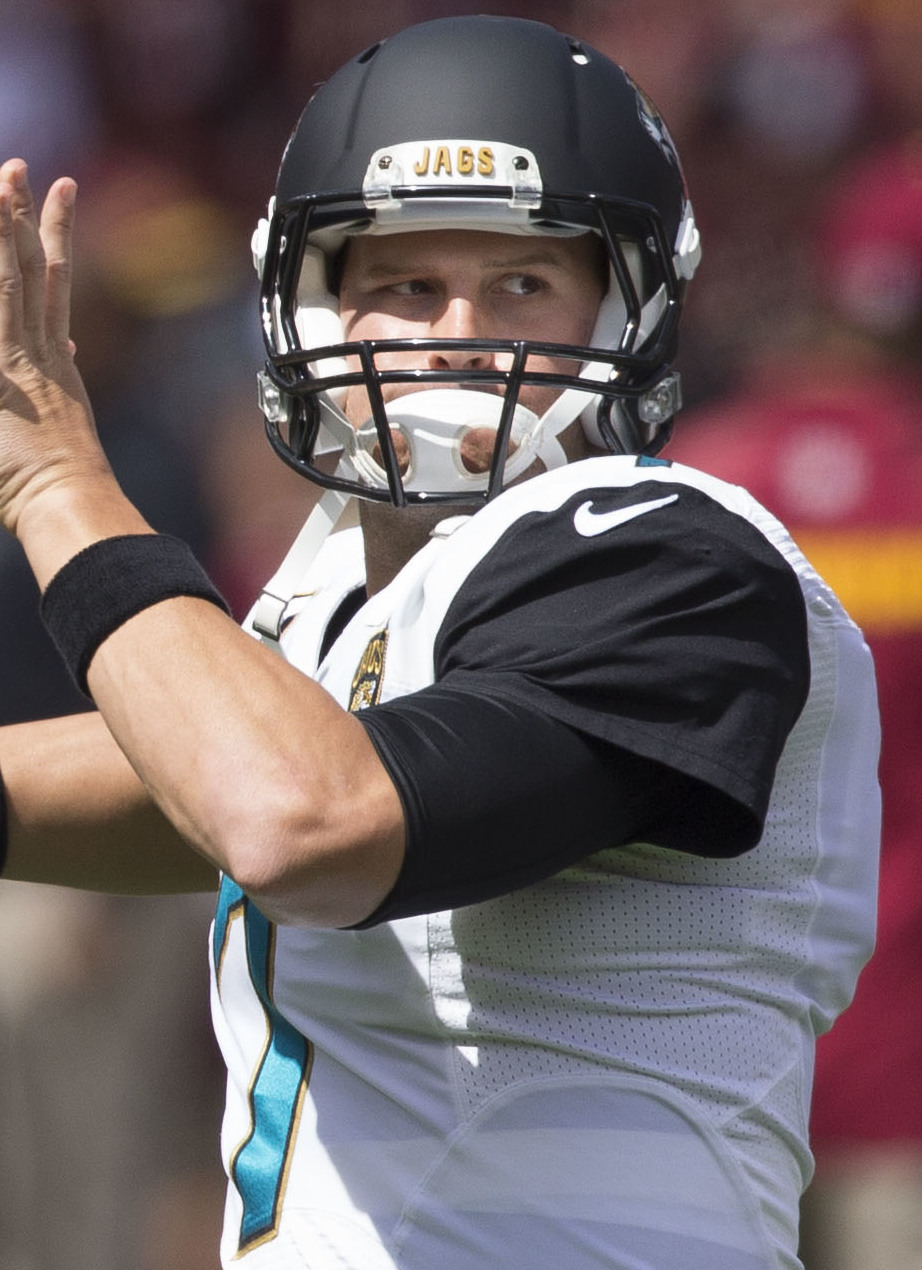
- Henne with the Jacksonville Jaguars in 2014

No. 7, 4
- Position: Quarterback

Personal information
- Born: July 2, 1985 (age 41); West Reading, Pennsylvania, U.S.
- Listed height: 6 ft 3 in (1.91 m)
- Listed weight: 230 lb (104 kg)

Career information
- High school: Wilson (West Lawn, Pennsylvania)
- College: Michigan (2004–2007)
- NFL draft: 2008: 2nd round, 57th overall pick

Career history
- Miami Dolphins (2008–2011); Jacksonville Jaguars (2012–2017); Kansas City Chiefs (2018–2022)

Awards and highlights
- 2× Super Bowl champion (LIV, LVII); First-team All-Big Ten (2007); Second-team All-Big Ten (2006)

Career NFL statistics
- Passing attempts: 2,015
- Passing completions: 1,200
- Completion percentage: 59.6%
- TD–INT: 60–63
- Passing yards: 13,290
- Passer rating: 76.1
- Stats at Pro Football Reference

Chad Steven Henne (/ˈhɛni/; born July 2, 1985) is an American former professional football player who was a quarterback for 15 seasons in the National Football League (NFL). He played college football for the Michigan Wolverines, where he is the all-time leader in passing yards and touchdowns, with 9,715 yards and 87 touchdowns. He was selected by the Miami Dolphins in the second round of the 2008 NFL draft, and started multiple seasons over his NFL career, for both the Dolphins and Jacksonville Jaguars. He also won two Super Bowls with the Kansas City Chiefs, serving as the backup quarterback.

== Early life ==
Henne moved into the Wilson School District prior to the start of his third grade year in 1994. He played in 43 scholastic games for the Bulldogs (42 starts) over four seasons, earning a record of 33–10. His Wilson football teams won two Lancaster-Lebanon League Section 1 titles, the first his freshman year (2000) and the second his junior season (2002). Henne's third scholastic year was his most successful, both individually and as a team. His 2002 Wilson Bulldogs squad finished their regular season undefeated with a record of 10–0 and were the 2002 PIAA District 3 AAAA runner-up, falling to Central Dauphin in a thrilling championship game. He amassed 7,071 passing yards in his high school career, which was fourth-most all-time (45th as of 2024) in PIAA history (and first in PIAA District 3) at the conclusion of Henne's senior season in the fall of 2003, behind John Veach (Mount Carmel Area), Evan Kraky (Lakeland), and Ron Powlus (Berwick). Henne holds three significant Wilson football program records (as of February 2020): career passing yardage (7,071); career passing touchdowns (74), and most touchdown passes in a game (5; tied). He was named to the Pennsylvania All-State Football Team as a senior in 2003, selected to participate in the 47th Annual Big 33 Football Classic in July 2004, was named the Pennsylvania Football Gatorade Player of the Year for 2003–2004, and earned national recognition as a member of the 2003–2004 Parade High School All-American Football Team. In October 2014, Henne was inducted into the Wilson High School Athletic Hall of Fame. In addition to his football accomplishments, Henne was also a member of the Wilson varsity basketball team for three years as well as an outstanding athlete for the Bulldogs track and field team, finishing as the PIAA runner-up in the javelin as a senior after finishing first at the District 3 meet two weeks earlier. Henne aspires to become a coach at his alma mater following his lengthy NFL career.

In 2000, his freshman season at Wilson Senior High School in West Lawn, Pennsylvania, Henne played QB in all 11 games and 10 starts. He rotated at QB with junior Ian Firestone in the Week 1 storm-delayed win vs Harrisburg, but would start the remaining 10 games for the Bulldogs and play the majority of the positional snaps. Against Wilson's first three opponents, Henne led comeback victories in their games with Harrisburg, Stroudsburg, and Boyertown before a setback at Cedar Crest to open League play. Henne's Wilson team would win their next six contests, including a thrilling comeback victory at Reading, before falling 7–21 in the 2000 District 3 AAAA semifinals to eventual champion Cumberland Valley. His freshman season was an overwhelming success, with the team finishing 9–2 and earning a share of the Lancaster-Lebanon League Section 1 title (with Cedar Crest and Reading).

Under Henne, Wilson would struggle during his second campaign as starter. The Bulldogs ended their season with an overall record of 6–4 and suffered three consecutive losses for the first time since the 1988 season.

At the end of his junior year in 2002, having been offered forty scholarships from various collegiate athletic programs, Henne narrowed his college options down to five schools: Miami, Michigan, Georgia, Tennessee, and Penn State.

Before his first game as a senior, Henne announced his plans to become a Wolverine at the University of Michigan. He was named to the preseason Pennsylvania All-State Football First-team. Following high school, Henne played in the 2004 U.S. Army All-American Bowl as a member of the East team.

== College career ==
In 2004, Henne entered the season as a freshman for the Wolverines, and third on the depth chart behind redshirt sophomore Matt Gutierrez and redshirt freshman quarterback Clayton Richard. The Monday prior to the season opener against the Miami RedHawks, Michigan head coach Lloyd Carr announced Gutierrez would start even though he was suffering from a sore shoulder. A few days later, Carr decided to allow Henne to start in relief of Gutierrez.

Henne ended his first career game with a 43–10 win, completing 14 of 24 passes for 142 yards, two touchdowns, and one interception. Henne was just the second true freshman in Michigan history to start on opening day, a feat not seen at Michigan since Rick Leach in 1975.

Alongside freshman running back Mike Hart, he galvanized an explosive offensive unit that featured receivers Braylon Edwards, Jason Avant, and Steve Breaston. All five would later go on to the NFL. Henne's freshman season was highlighted by a triple-overtime win over in-state rival Michigan State and a record-tying performance in the Rose Bowl against Texas. He also tied the Michigan season record for touchdown passes with 25, first set by Elvis Grbac in 1991.

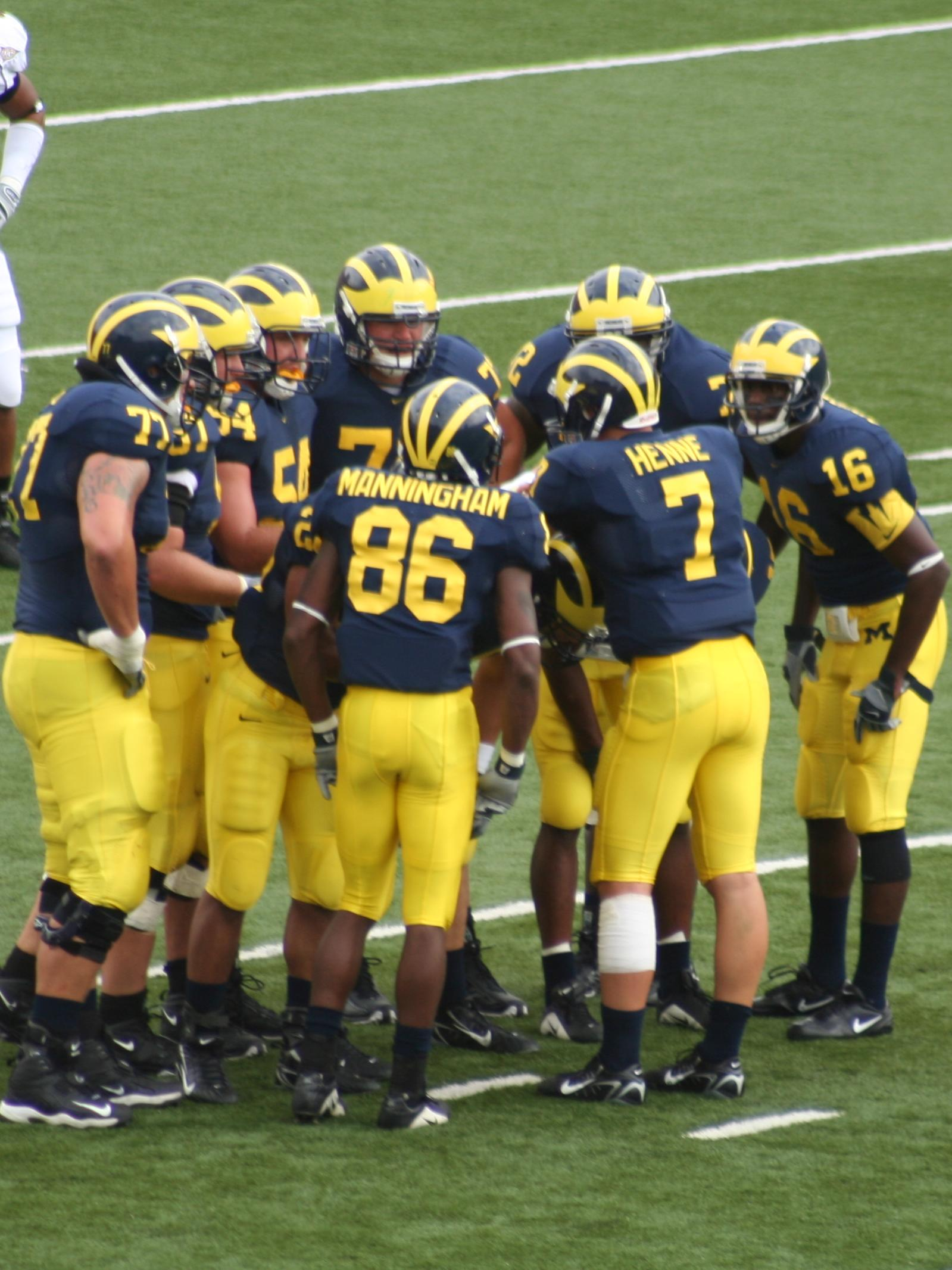
2006 Michigan Wolverines football team huddle with #86 Mario Manningham, #7 Henne, #16 Adrian Arrington, #72 Rueben Riley, #54 Mark Bihl, #77 Jake Long

Henne was criticized in 2005 after Michigan, ranked in the top five of the preseason polls, stumbled to a 3–3 start. The sophomore quarterback was particularly scrutinized after his performance in a close loss to Notre Dame, in which he completed fewer than half of his pass attempts and lost a fumble on the goal line. After their 3–3 start, Michigan won four consecutive games to clinch the program's 21st consecutive winning season.

As a junior in 2006, Henne earned Rivals.com All-American third-team honors. He was a Manning Award finalist, Maxwell Award semifinalist, Davey O'Brien Award semifinalist, and Walter Camp Award candidate. The All-Big Ten Conference second-team choice started all thirteen games. He hit on 203-of-328 passes for 2,508 yards and 22 touchdowns with eight interceptions, ranking fifth in Michigan's season record list for touchdown passes, eighth in attempts and completions and tenth in passing yards. For the third straight year Michigan concluded their season by losing to Ohio State and then dropping their bowl game, this time to Southern California.

During his senior year in 2007, Henne completed 162 of 278 passes for 1,938 yards, 17 touchdowns, and nine interceptions. The first game of the season ended in disaster for Michigan, a loss to Appalachian State that was considered one of the biggest sports upsets of all time. In the following game Henne suffered a knee injury in the first half against Oregon, and sat out the second half, as well as subsequent games against Notre Dame and Penn State, before returning to the starting lineup against Northwestern. In the final regular season game, Michigan fell to Ohio State 14–3, completing an 0–4 career record for Henne and fellow seniors Mike Hart and Jake Long against the Buckeyes. Henne played his final collegiate game against Florida in the Capital One Bowl. Henne was named the MVP of the game after he led his team to a 41–35 victory over the Gators and reigning Heisman Trophy winner, Tim Tebow.

For his collegiate career, Henne completed 828 of 1,387 passes for 9,715 yards, 87 touchdowns, and 37 interceptions. All five marks are school records. Henne's passing touchdown total is second in Big Ten Conference history.

== Professional career ==
Pre-draft measurables
Height	Weight	Arm length	Hand span	40-yard dash	10-yard split	20-yard split	20-yard shuttle	Three-cone drill	Vertical jump	Broad jump	Wonderlic
6 ft 2 7/8 in (1.90 m)	230 lb (104 kg)	31 5/8 in (0.80 m)	9 in (0.23 m)	4.92 s	1.70 s	2.81 s	4.40 s	7.17 s	25.5 in (0.65 m)	8 ft 10 in (2.69 m)	22
All values from NFL Combine

=== Miami Dolphins ===
==== 2008 season ====
Henne was selected by the Miami Dolphins in the second round (57th overall) of the 2008 NFL draft. He was the fourth quarterback chosen, following Matt Ryan, Joe Flacco, and Brian Brohm. His left tackle at Michigan, Jake Long, was the first selection of the draft and would again play alongside Henne in Miami.

Henne agreed to a four-year, $3.5 million contract with the team on July 26. Out of training camp, Henne earned the backup quarterback role behind starter Chad Pennington. During the second game of the 2008 season, Henne made his NFL debut with 9:42 left; down 31–3 against the Arizona Cardinals. Henne spent the remainder of the season on the bench and played in only two other games, both divisional matchups with the New England Patriots.

==== 2009 season ====
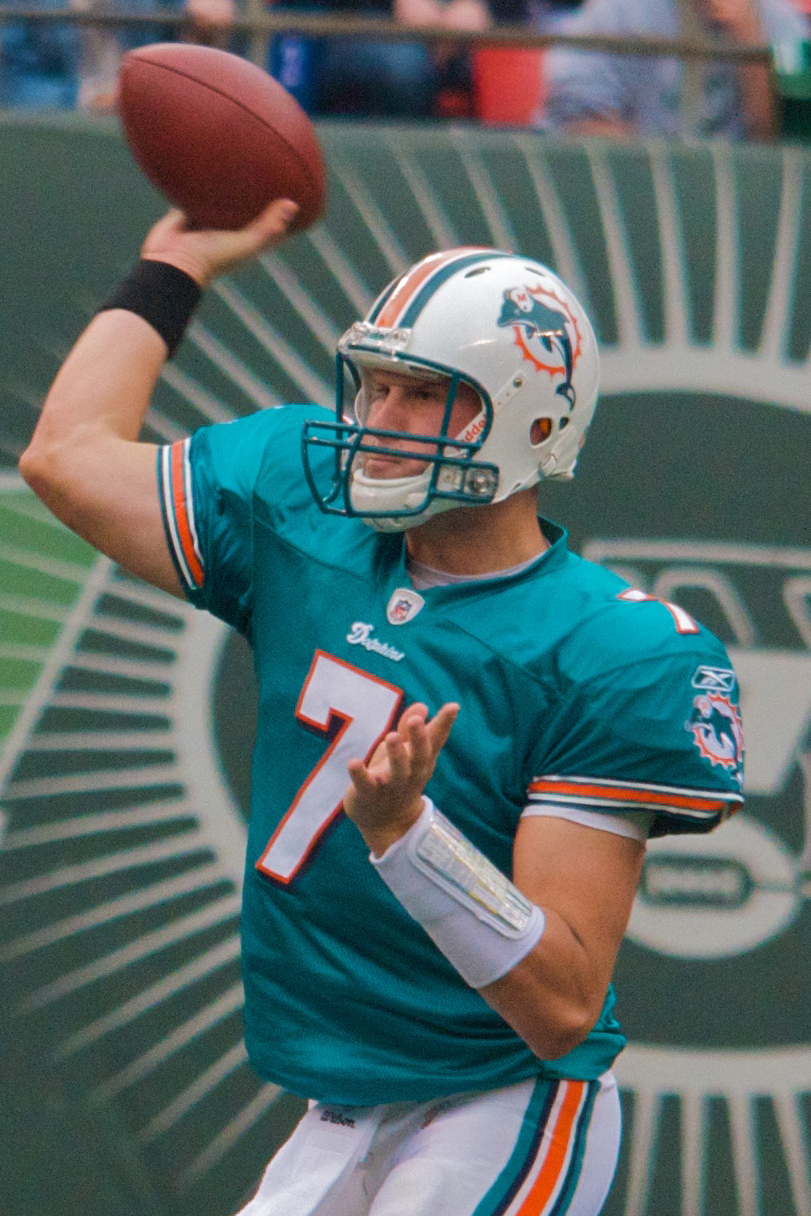
Henne vs. the New York Jets in 2009

During the third game of the 2009 season, in the early third quarter of a road game versus the San Diego Chargers, San Diego linebacker Kevin Burnett knocked Chad Pennington out of the game with a season-ending injury to his shoulder and rotator cuff. Henne came off the bench in relief. Though he led the Dolphins offense to ten points in the final 20 minutes of the game, he also had an interception returned 31 yards for a touchdown by Eric Weddle.

Henne made his first career start on October 4, 2009, against the Buffalo Bills at home. Henne went 14–of–22 with one touchdown in a 38–10 victory, lifting the team to a 1–3 record. In his second NFL start, he led the underdog Dolphins to a 31–27 win over the New York Jets in a Monday Night Football game. He completed 20 out of 26 passes for 241 yards with two touchdowns. This was Henne's second straight win as starter and included a 53-yard touchdown pass to Ted Ginn Jr.

Henne consistently improved as the season went on, passing for 335 yards against the New England Patriots in Week 13. In Week 15, Henne passed for 349 yards in a loss to the Tennessee Titans. In Week 16, Henne passed for 322 yards in a loss to the Houston Texans. In Week 17 against the Pittsburgh Steelers, Henne had gained 140 yards on 16–of–20 passing with one touchdown and interception, but had to leave the game with an eye injury.

==== 2010 season ====
On November 10, 2010, after a 4–4 start to the 2010 season, Henne lost his starting job to Pennington. Pennington had led the Dolphins to an AFC East championship in 2008. On November 14, during the game against the Tennessee Titans, Henne came in relief for Pennington who went out with an apparent shoulder injury. During the third quarter, Henne himself was injured with an apparent knee injury and was replaced by Tyler Thigpen. Henne returned to action in Week 12 against the Oakland Raiders winning 33–17. In Week 13, Henne went back to his inconsistencies. He completed 16 of 32 passes and throwing 3 picks in a loss to the Browns. The following week, he went 5–of–18 for 53 yards and one touchdown in a 10–6 win against the New York Jets on an extremely rainy day. In Week 15, he faced the Buffalo Bills going 33–of–45 for 176 yards with one touchdown and one interception. This came in a loss, which officially eliminated Miami from the playoffs. In Week 16, Henne faced the Detroit Lions and finished with a loss. Henne went 29 of 44 for 278 yards with one touchdown and two interceptions. Henne had two opportunities in the fourth quarter to lead a game-winning drive and a game-tying drive, but poor play calling led to a loss. In the last week of the season against the New England Patriots, Henne went 6–16 for 71 yards with an interception. Henne finished the year with 3301 yards along with 15 touchdowns and 19 interceptions.

His job as starter was thought to be in question during the off-season when it was rumored that the Dolphins sought to acquire Kyle Orton from the Denver Broncos. Coupled with the acquisition of Carolina Panthers quarterback Matt Moore and rookie draft pick Pat Devlin, it was unclear if Miami would continue its commitment with Henne. The Orton rumor eventually fizzled and Devlin was waived and signed to the practice squad, leaving Moore and Henne as the two quarterbacks on the active roster. It would later be announced that Henne would have the starting job in 2011.

==== 2011 season ====
Henne's 2011 starting campaign began well, throwing for 416 yards and a professional career-best passer rating of 93.6. These improvements were overshadowed by Tom Brady's 517 pass yards and the resulting loss to the New England Patriots. It was the seventh game of all time to have two quarterbacks surpass 400 yards passing. On Sunday October 2, 2011, in a game against the San Diego Chargers, Henne hurt his left shoulder at the end of a run on a broken play on the Dolphins' second possession and did not return. His injury was later revealed to be a dislocated shoulder in his left (non-throwing) arm. Slated to undergo surgery, Henne was placed on injured reserve and missed the remainder of the 2011 season. The Miami Dolphins announced on February 21, 2012, that they would not re-sign Henne, making him a free agent.

=== Jacksonville Jaguars ===
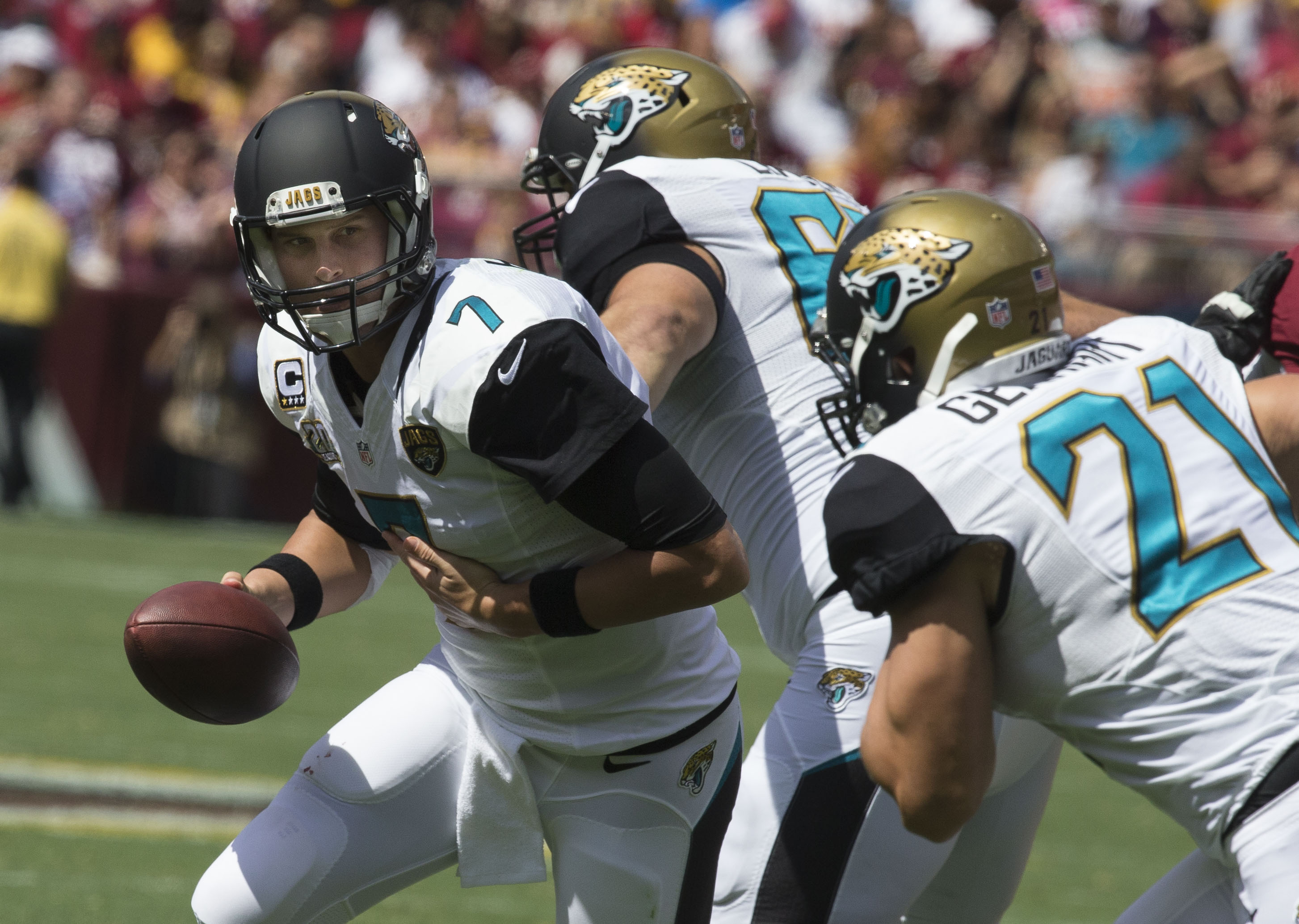
Henne handing off to Toby Gerhart

Henne signed a two-year deal with the Jacksonville Jaguars on March 14, 2012. In the Jaguars Week 11 game against the Texans, Henne came in for an injured Blaine Gabbert and threw for 354 yards and 4 touchdowns. Henne and Steve Young are the only two players in NFL history since the merger to not start the beginning of a game and throw 4 touchdowns without an interception. He started the final six games of the season for the team after an injury to Gabbert. After Gabbert was benched midway through the 2013 season, Henne became the starter for the rest of the season, starting a total of thirteen games. The Jaguars would go on to finish the season with a 4–12 record.

On March 7, 2014, Henne signed a two-year, $8 million extension for $4.5 million guaranteed with the Jaguars. Following a disappointing first half in the 2014 home opener in Week 3, Henne was benched in favor of rookie first-round draft pick Blake Bortles. Bortles remained the starter for the rest of the season, leaving Henne as the backup. In 2015, Henne remained the backup for Bortles. He did not see any action in the 2015 season. Henne signed another two-year, $8 million contract extension on February 18, 2016, to remain as the backup to Bortles. Over the next three seasons, he saw action in a total of four games as an alternate. On February 15, 2017, the Jaguars restructured Henne's contract.

=== Kansas City Chiefs ===
On March 16, 2018, Henne signed a two-year contract with the Kansas City Chiefs. In the 2018 season, Henne was the backup to Patrick Mahomes, and made a single appearance in Week 17 against the Oakland Raiders. On September 1, 2019, Henne was placed on injured reserve. He was designated for return from injured reserve on October 23 and began practicing with the team, eventually being re-activated on November 2. In the 2019 season, although Henne did not play a snap, he won his first championship when the Chiefs defeated the San Francisco 49ers 31–20 in Super Bowl LIV.

Henne re-signed with the Chiefs on a two-year contract on March 19, 2020. In Week 7 against the Denver Broncos, he came into the game in relief of Mahomes and scored a rushing touchdown in the 43–16 victory, his first rushing TD since December 2, 2012, against the Bills. On December 30, with the Chiefs locking up the number 1 seed, head coach Andy Reid announced that Henne would start the Chiefs' season finale against the Los Angeles Chargers, resting their starters. It would be Henne's first start since Week 3 of the 2014 season with the Jaguars, which saw him throw for 218 yards and two touchdowns in the 21–38 loss. On January 17, 2021, in the Divisional Round against the Cleveland Browns, Henne came into the game in relief of Mahomes halfway through the third quarter after the latter left the game with a concussion. Through the rest of the game, Henne threw 6 receptions for only 66 yards and an interception. However, he ran 13 yards on third-down-and-14 with two minutes left in the game, which ran critical time off the clock and left the Chiefs at fourth-and-one. On the subsequent play, his 5-yard pass to Tyreek Hill led to a first down, allowing the Chiefs to run out the clock and preserve a 22–17 victory.

Henne signed a one-year contract with the Chiefs on March 24, 2022.

On January 21, 2023, Henne replaced an injured Mahomes and led a franchise playoff record 98-yard touchdown drive in the 27–20 Divisional Round victory over his former Jacksonville Jaguars.

=== Retirement ===
On February 12, 2023, after the Chiefs defeated the Eagles in Super Bowl LVII, Henne announced via his Instagram that he would be retiring from the NFL.

== Career statistics ==
=== NFL ===
Legend
	Won the Super Bowl
**Bold**	Career high

==== Regular season ====
Year	Team	Games			Passing								Rushing				Sacks		Fumbles	
Year	Team	GP	GS	Record	Cmp	Att	Pct	Yds	Y/A	TD	Int	Rtg	Att	Yds	Avg	TD	Sck	Yds	Fum	Lost
2008	MIA	3	0	—	7	12	58.3	67	5.6	0	0	74.0	0	0	0.0	0	0	0	0	0
2009	MIA	14	13	**7–6**	274	451	60.8	2,878	6.4	12	14	75.2	16	32	2.0	**1**	26	176	4	0
2010	MIA	**15**	**14**	6–8	301	490	61.4	**3,301**	6.7	**15**	**19**	75.4	**35**	52	1.5	0	30	178	**5**	**2**
2011	MIA	4	4	0–4	64	112	57.1	868	7.8	4	4	79.0	15	**112**	**7.5**	**1**	11	67	1	0
2012	JAX	10	6	1–5	166	308	53.9	2,084	6.8	11	11	72.2	11	53	3.4	**1**	28	169	4	**2**
2013	JAX	**15**	13	4–9	**305**	**503**	60.6	3,241	6.4	13	14	76.5	27	77	2.9	0	**38**	**243**	2	0
2014	JAX	3	3	0–3	42	78	53.8	492	6.3	3	1	80.7	4	25	6.3	0	16	105	1	1
2015	JAX	0	0	—	DNP															
2016	JAX	1	0	—	0	0	—	0	—	0	0	—	1	−2	−2.0	0	0	0	0	0
2017	JAX	2	0	—	0	2	0.0	0	0.0	0	0	39.6	5	−5	−1.0	0	0	0	0	0
2018	KC	1	0	—	2	3	66.7	29	**9.7**	0	0	97.9	1	3	3.0	0	0	0	0	0
2019	KC	0	0	—	DNP															
2020	KC	3	1	0–1	28	38	**73.7**	248	6.5	2	0	**108.2**	7	−2	−0.3	**1**	2	4	2	0
2021	KC	4	0	—	11	16	68.8	82	5.1	0	0	80.7	8	0	0.0	0	0	0	0	0
2022	KC	3	0	—	0	2	0.0	0	0.0	0	0	39.6	5	−5	−1.0	0	0	0	1	0
Career		78	54	18–36	1,200	2,015	59.6	13,290	6.6	60	63	76.1	143	351	2.5	4	151	942	20	5

==== Postseason ====
Year	Team	Games			Passing								Rushing				Sacks		Fumbles	
Year	Team	GP	GS	Record	Cmp	Att	Pct	Yds	Y/A	TD	Int	Rtg	Att	Yds	Avg	TD	Sck	Yds	Fum	Lost
2008	MIA	0	0	—	DNP															
2017	JAX	0	0	—	DNP															
2018	KC	0	0	—	DNP															
2019	KC	0	0	—	DNP															
2020	KC	1	0	—	6	8	75.0	66	8.3	0	1	59.4	2	12	6.0	0	1	6	0	0
2021	KC	0	0	—	DNP															
2022	KC	1	0	—	5	7	71.0	23	3.3	1	0	114.9	1	−1	−1.0	0	0	0	0	0
Career		2	0	—	11	15	73.3	89	5.9	1	1	82.4	3	11	3.7	0	1	6	0	0

=== College ===
Season	Team	Games		Passing								Rushing				
Season	Team	GP	GS	Cmp	Att	Pct	Yds	Lng	TD	Int	Rtg	Att	Yds	Avg	Lng	TD
2004	Michigan	12	12	240	399	60.2	2,743	69	25	12	132.6	55	−137	−2.5	9	2
2005	Michigan	12	12	223	382	58.4	2,526	54	23	8	129.6	54	25	0.5	18	1
2006	Michigan	13	13	203	328	61.9	2,508	69	22	8	143.4	47	−83	−1.8	14	0
2007	Michigan	10	8	162	278	58.3	1,938	65	17	9	130.5	24	−120	−5.0	9	0
Total		47	45	828	1,387	59.7	9,715	69	87	37	133.9	180	−315	−1.8	18	3

== Personal life ==
On July 3, 2010, Henne married Brittany Hartman in Perkasie, Pennsylvania.

== See also ==
- Lists of Michigan Wolverines football passing leaders
