= Joe Long (American football) =

American football player (born 1989)

Profile
- Position: Offensive tackle

Personal information
- Born: July 27, 1989 (age 37); Lapeer, Michigan, U.S.
- Listed height: 6 ft 5 in (1.96 m)
- Listed weight: 304 lb (138 kg)

Career information
- High school: Lapeer (MI) East
- College: Wayne State
- NFL draft: 2012: undrafted

Career history
- St. Louis Rams (2012)*; Pittsburgh Steelers (2012–2013)*; Chicago Bears (2013); Detroit Lions (2014)*
- * Offseason or practice squad member only
- Stats at Pro Football Reference

Joseph R. Long (born July 27, 1989) is an American former professional football player who was an offensive tackle in the National Football League (NFL). Long attended Wayne State University in Michigan and joined the St. Louis Rams as a free agent as he went undrafted in the 2012 NFL draft. His brother is former offensive tackle Jake Long.

Long attended Lapeer East High School in Lapeer, Michigan, where he played in the 2007 Michigan High School Football Coaches Association All-Star game which earned him a spot on the Second-team All-Flint Metro League and honorable mention AP Class A All-State honors. Long also was a basketball player and was involved in track while in high school.

At Wayne State University, Following his freshman season in which he earned All-GLIAC Honorable Mention Team and also voted WSU's Co-Offensive Rookie of the Year. Following his junior season, Long was named to the D2Football.com Honorable Mention All-America team and selected to the Hansen's Football Gazette All-Region Third-team. Following his senior season, he received the 2011 Gene Upshaw Award as the top Division II lineman. He was the GLIAC Offensive Lineman of the Year also his senior season. He also was a member of the Associated Press Little All-America First-team in his senior season. He blocked for three running backs (including former Detroit Lions running back Joique Bell) that rushed for 1,000 yard seasons during his time at Wayne State University.

Long has also played for the Pittsburgh Steelers.

== Early life ==
A 2007 graduate of Lapeer East High School, Long played in the 2007 Michigan High School Football Coaches Association All-Star game which earned him a spot on the Second-team All-Flint Metro League and honorable mention AP Class A All-State honors. He also participated in basketball and track for the Eagles which he served as a team captain in both football and basketball. Long also played hockey as a freshman.

== College career ==
In 2007 season, Long dressed for the five home games and the game at St. Joseph's.

In 2008 season, he started all 11 games at left tackle and was named to the All-GLIAC Honorable Mention Team and also voted WSU's Co-Offensive Rookie of the Year. He helped Wayne State university rush for over 170 yards per game in that season.

In 2009 season, Long was named to the GLIAC All-Academic team which he started all 11 games at left tackle. Long also was named to the All-GLIAC Honorable Mention team leading to key contributor to an offense that ranked second in the GLIAC and ninth nationally in rushing yards per game (233.7)

In 2010 season, Long was named to the D2Football.com Honorable Mention All-America team in which he was selected to the Daktronics Super Region #3 Second-team offense. Long also was named to the Hansen's Football Gazette All-Region Third-team as an offensive tackle and voted to the All-GLIAC First-team offensive line. He was named to the GLIAC All-Academic team and was one of the Warrior captains in which he was the squad's Co-offensive Player of the Week for the Northwood game. He shared the team's Offensive Player of the Week award for the Saginaw Valley contest with the rest of the offensive line. He was a regional finalist for the Gene Upshaw Award and he earned the team's the Ultimate Warrior award for the football student-athlete who did outstanding work in the weight room.

In 2011 season, he was the recipient of the 2011 Gene Upshaw Award as the top Division II lineman in both offensive and defensive side. He was selected to the Daktronics All-America First-team as well as the All-America First-teams for both D2Football.com and Hansen's Football Gazette team following the season. He was selected to the Associated Press Little All-America First-team. He was selected to the Don Hansen's Super Region Three First-team along with being selected as the GLIAC Offensive Lineman of the Year on November 17, 2011. He was selected to the Daktronics Super Region First-team and was voted as the top vote-getter at offensive line position and was selected to the 2011 All-GLIAC First-team on January 19, 2012. He also was selected as the Super Region 3 Offensive Player of the Year by Don Hansen and also was selected to the 2011 GLIAC All-Academic Team. He blocked an important third quarter field goal attempt at St. Cloud with Wayne State leading 27-24 to earn WSU's Special Teams Player of the Week award for his efforts that game. He contributed in Wayne State's offensive Line as it help lead the team to rush for 1,038 rushing yards and 15 rushing touchdowns in the 2011 NCAA playoffs.

Long started all 49 games at left tackle breaking the school record for both career and consecutive starts (Rich Baur, 1993–96, 44 starts). He blocked for a 1,000-yard rusher all four seasons (Joique Bell rushed for 1152 yards in 2008 and 2084 yards in 2009), (Josh Renel rushed for 1249 yards in 2010 and 1353 yards in 2011 and Toney Davis ran for 1557 yards in 2011). On January 21, 2012, he participated in the 2012 East-West Shrine Game.

== Professional career ==
Pre-draft measurables
Height	Weight	40-yard dash	10-yard split	20-yard split	20-yard shuttle	Three-cone drill	Vertical jump	Broad jump	Bench press
6 ft 5 3/4 in (1.97 m)	308 lb (140 kg)	5.46 s	1.83 s	3.01 s	4.59 s	7.69 s	27.5 in (0.70 m)	8 ft 2 in (2.49 m)	21 reps
All values from Pro Day

=== St. Louis Rams ===
Long signed with the St. Louis Rams as an undrafted free agent. On August 31, 2012, he was released.

=== Pittsburgh Steelers ===
On November 28, 2012, he signed with the Pittsburgh Steelers to join the practice squad.

=== Chicago Bears ===
On December 18, 2013, Long signed a 2-year contract with the Chicago Bears. He was released on August 24, 2014.

=== Detroit Lions ===
On December 31, 2014, Long signed with the Detroit Lions to join the practice squad.
