= 2006 Michigan Wolverines football team =

American college football season

2006 Michigan Wolverines football

Rose Bowl, L 18–32 vs. USC
- Conference: Big Ten Conference

Ranking
- Coaches: No. 9
- AP: No. 8
- Record: 11–2 (7–1 Big Ten)
- Head coach: Lloyd Carr (12th season)
- Offensive coordinator: Mike DeBord (4th season)
- Offensive scheme: Multiple
- Defensive coordinator: Ron English (1st season)
- Base defense: Multiple
- MVPs: David Harris; Mike Hart
- Captains: Jake Long; LaMarr Woodley
- Home stadium: Michigan Stadium

2006 Big Ten Conference football standings
	Conf.			Overall
Team	W		L	W		L
No. 2 Ohio State $	8	–	0	12	–	1
No. 8 Michigan %	7	–	1	11	–	2
No. 7 Wisconsin	7	–	1	12	–	1
No. 24 Penn State	5	–	3	9	–	4
Purdue	5	–	3	8	–	6
Minnesota	3	–	5	6	–	7
Indiana	3	–	5	5	–	7
Northwestern	2	–	6	4	–	8
Iowa	2	–	6	6	–	7
Illinois	1	–	7	2	–	10
Michigan State	1	–	7	4	–	8
$ – BCS representative as conference champion; % – BCS at-large representative; Rankings from AP Poll

The 2006 Michigan Wolverines football team represented the University of Michigan in the 2006 NCAA Division I FBS football season. The team's head football coach was Lloyd Carr. The Wolverines played their home games at Michigan Stadium.

The Wolverines came into the season with lower expectations than many Michigan teams of the previous few seasons, ranked #14. They won their first 11 games and rose to No. 2 in the national rankings before losing a close battle in Columbus to top-ranked Ohio State. Michigan concluded their schedule in the Rose Bowl against the USC Trojans. The game was tied 3–3 at half time, but USC pulled away in the second half, handing Michigan their second loss of the season.

The 2006 Michigan Wolverines finished the season with a record of 11–2, ranked No. 8 in the nation, and tied for second in the Big Ten Conference with Wisconsin, whom they defeated, 27–13, early that season.

== Schedule ==
Date	Time	Opponent	Rank	Site	TV	Result	Attendance	Source
September 2	12:00 p.m.	Vanderbilt*	No. 14	Michigan Stadium; Ann Arbor, MI	ESPN	W 27–7	109,668	
September 9	12:00 p.m.	Central Michigan*	No. 10	Michigan Stadium; Ann Arbor, MI	ESPN Plus	W 41–17	108,712	
September 16	3:30 p.m.	at No. 2 Notre Dame*	No. 11	Notre Dame Stadium; Notre Dame, IN (rivalry)	NBC	W 47–21	80,795	
September 23	12:00 p.m.	Wisconsin	No. 6	Michigan Stadium; Ann Arbor, MI	ESPN	W 27–13	111,058	
September 30	8:00 p.m.	at Minnesota	No. 6	Hubert H. Humphrey Metrodome; Minneapolis, MN (Little Brown Jug)	ESPN	W 28–14	50,805	
October 7	4:30 p.m.	Michigan State	No. 6	Michigan Stadium; Ann Arbor, MI (rivalry)	ESPN	W 31–13	111,349	
October 14	8:00 p.m.	at Penn State	No. 4	Beaver Stadium; University Park, PA (rivalry)	ABC	W 17–10	110,007	
October 21	3:30 p.m.	Iowa	No. 2	Michigan Stadium; Ann Arbor, MI	ABC	W 20–6	110,923	
October 28	12:00 p.m.	Northwestern^{†}	No. 2	Michigan Stadium; Ann Arbor, MI (rivalry)	ESPN	W 17–3	109,114	
November 4	12:00 p.m.	Ball State*	No. 2	Michigan Stadium; Ann Arbor, MI	ESPNU	W 34–26	109,359	
November 11	3:30 p.m.	at Indiana	No. 2	Memorial Stadium; Bloomington, IN	ESPN	W 34–3	42,320	
November 18	3:30 p.m.	at No. 1 Ohio State	No. 2	Ohio Stadium; Columbus, OH (The Game, College GameDay)	ABC	L 39–42	105,708	
January 1, 2007	5:00 p.m.	vs. No. 8 USC*	No. 3	Rose Bowl; Pasadena, CA (Rose Bowl, College GameDay)	ABC	L 18–32	93,852	
*Non-conference game; ^{†}Homecoming; Rankings from AP Poll released prior to the game; All times are in Eastern time

== Preseason ==
The 2005 offseason saw a coaching shakeup, prompted by the departure of coordinators Terry Malone and Jim Herrmann. Ron English was promoted from secondary coach to defensive coordinator and Mike DeBord from special teams coach to offensive coordinator, while Steve Szabo and Ron Lee were hired as assistant coaches.

Michigan returned 18 of 22 starters for 2006, one of the highest totals in the nation.

The Wolverines, led by third-year starting quarterback Chad Henne, expected to compete for the Big Ten title and associated BCS bowl bid. The voters of the Coaches Poll and AP poll also expected improvement, respectively ranking Michigan No. 15 and No. 14.

True sophomore Antonio Bass suffered a career ending knee injury in fall practice. Bass was expected to play wide receiver and occasionally quarterback. Projected starting right tackle Mike Kolodziej's career was cut short due to injury just before the season due to unknown medical problems.

== Game summaries ==
=== Vanderbilt ===
Vanderbilt at Michigan

Team	1	2	3	4	Total
Commodores	0	7	0	0	7
• #14 Wolverines	10	3	7	7	27

- Location: Michigan Stadium
  Ann Arbor, MI
- Game start: 12:00 p.m. EST
- Elapsed time: 3:03
- Game attendance: 109,668
- Game weather: 65 °F (18 °C), Mostly Cloudy, NE 15 MPH
- Referee: Bill LeMonnier
- TV announcers (ESPN): Sean McDonough (Play-by-play), Chris Spielman (Color) & Rob Stone (Sideline)

Michigan's defense held the Commodores to 171 total yards of offense (129 passing, 42 rushing). Star junior running back Mike Hart ran for 146 yards on 31 carries to kick off the 2006 season. Defensive coordinator Ron English's squad proved to be considerably more aggressive than recent Wolverine defenses, collecting six sacks and forcing two turnovers (both via lost fumbles). Michigan's offense was led by a strong rushing attack, which unveiled a new scheme using zone blocking. Behind this zone blocking scheme, the Wolverines rushed for 246 yards on the day and averaged 4.8 yards per carry. Michigan scored on their first drive of the game, as Hart busted off several big runs, and true sophomore running back Kevin Grady finished it off with a 19-yard touchdown run. Later in the first, Michigan thought they had a touchdown pass from junior quarterback Chad Henne to true sophomore receiver Mario Manningham. But after reviewing the play, it was ruled that Manningham dropped the ball, and Michigan settled for a 33-yard field-goal by senior kicker Garrett Rivas. In the second quarter, Vanderbilt caught the Wolverines by surprise, as sophomore receiver Earl Bennett completed a halfback toss pass to wide open senior receiver Marlon White for a 30-yard touchdown. Bennett, led the Commodores on the day with 6 catches for 58 yards). On U-M's ensuing drive, Henne hit senior wide receiver Steve Breaston on a short hook route, and Breaston proceeded to make a phenomenal run after the catch, juking out several Commodores before finally being shoved out of bounds. The play went for 29 yards, and it set up a 48-yard field-goal by Rivas. At halftime, it was 13–7 Wolverines. The third quarter was sluggish for both teams, but with 2:29 to go, Henne found senior tight end Tyler Ecker in the back of the end zone for a 14-yard touchdown pass. Ecker made a leaping catch with his arms stretched out in the air, and he managed to haul it down with one foot in the end zone. Vanderbilt wasn't out of it yet, and they advanced to the Michigan 27 yard-line with under 10 minutes to go in the fourth quarter, and a great chance to cut its deficit to one score. However, a 4th down and 5 pass on that drive fell incomplete. Michigan put the game away for good with 2:11 left, as Manningham redeemed himself with a 27-yard bomb of a touchdown catch on 3rd and 10, setting the final score at 27–7. Michigan's defense was vicious all day, as they held Vanderbilt to 1.6 yards per carry. Senior defensive end Rondell Biggs led the Michigan defense with 6 tackles, 4 tackles for loss, and 2 sacks. Grady finished with 5 carries for 30 yards and one touchdown, Manningham had 3 catches for 44 yards and one touchdown, and Breaston led Michigan with 4 catches for 68 yards. Sophomore Quarterback Chris Nickson was Vanderbilt's leading passer and rusher, but he only completed 11 of 25 passes for 99 yards, and he was held to 16 carries for 22 yards on the ground.

=== Central Michigan ===
Central Michigan at Michigan

Team	1	2	3	4	Total
Chippewas	0	10	0	7	17
• #10 Wolverines	14	10	10	7	41

- Location: Michigan Stadium
  Ann Arbor, MI
- Game start: 12:00 p.m. EST
- Elapsed time: 2:57
- Game attendance: 108,712
- Game weather: 68 °F (20 °C), Cloudy/Chance of rain, NW 7 MPH- Game delayed one hour due to weather in first quarter
- Referee: Dan Capron
- TV announcers (ESPN+): Wayne Larrivee (Play-by-play) & Kelly Stouffer (Color)

In a game interrupted by the first weather delay in Michigan Stadium history, Michigan kept it on the ground against the Chippewas, rushing 50 times against only 21 pass attempts. The Wolverines running game once again dominated, rushing for 252 yards and averaging 5.0 yards per carry. Their defense was also relentless, holding the Mid-American Conference champions dangerous spread offense to 204 total offensive yards (188 passing and a measly 16 yards rushing).

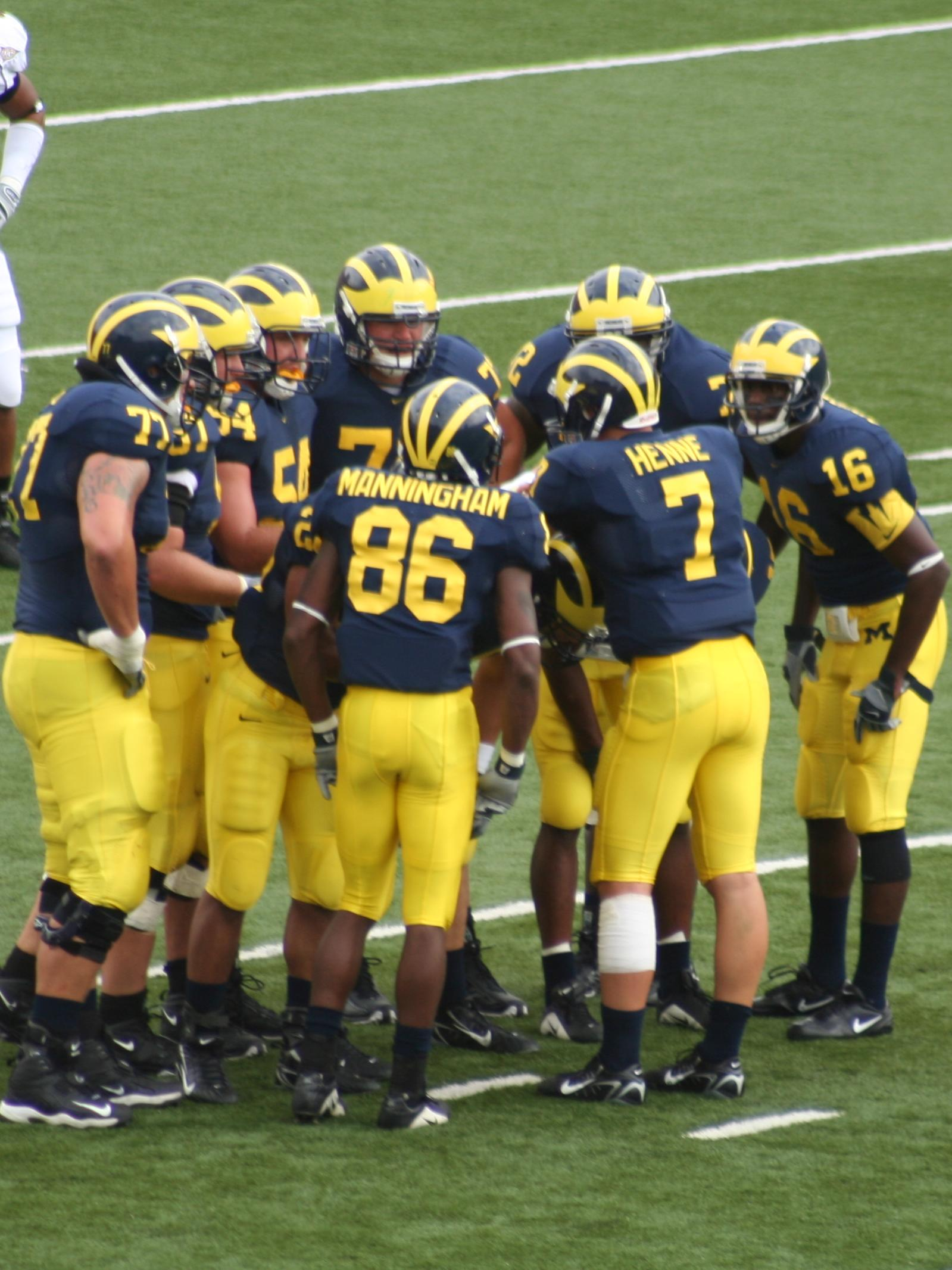
Huddle with No. 86 Mario Manningham, No. 7 Chad Henne, No. 16 Adrian Arrington, No. 72 Rueben Riley, No. 54 Mark Bihl, No. 77 Jake Long

The game started off badly for Michigan, as Hart fumbled on the game's first play. It was his first fumble since the 2004 game against Iowa, having gone over 700 touches without fumbling. However Manningham recovered the fumble, and Hart scored a 5-yard touchdown run on that opening drive. It was Hart's first touchdown-running or receiving-since midway through the 2005 season, when he scored a third-quarter touchdown run in a 27–25 win over Penn State. Hart had gone six straight games without scoring a touchdown. The Chippewas marched to the U-M 14 yard line directly following Hart's touchdown run, but All-American senior defensive end LaMarr Woodley sacked sensational redshirt freshmen quarterback Dan LeFevour and caused a fumble, which he recovered. Hart added another touchdown run with 1:28 to go in the first quarter, this time from 18 yards out. CMU fumbled and turned the ball over again following Hart's second TD, and the fumble was once again recovered by Woodley. The Wolverines converted that turnover into a 21–0 lead, as Grady crashed in from three yards out with 12:24 left in the second quarter. On the drive following Grady's touchdown, CMU got on the scoreboard, with LeFevour finding junior receiver Justin Gardner for a 38-yard touchdown strike. The two teams then exchanged field-goals, and it was 24–10 Michigan at halftime. The Chippweas got the ball to start the third quarter, and they advanced to the Michigan 34 yard line, but a LeFevour pass on 4th and 7 fell incomplete, and the Wolverines all but put the game away on the ensuing possession. Breaston made a brilliant 26 yard run on a wide receiver reverse, and Hart finished off the drive with a 2-yard touchdown run-his third score of the day. Rivas added his second field goal of the day with 1:22 remaining to give Michigan a 34–10 lead going into the fourth quarter. With 11:41 left in the game, junior outside linebacker Max Pollack intercepted a bad pass by LeFevour and returned it 12 yards for a touchdown and a 41–10 lead. Pollack was merely a substitution at OLB, and he also was only a walkon. At this point, Michigan had all their backups on the field, and CMU scored one more touchdown: a 3-yard pass from LeFevour to senior receiver Damien Linson.

Hart finished with 19 carries for 116 yards and 3 touchdowns. Grady added 12 carries for 46 yards and 1 touchdown. Breaston had 6 touches for 109 all purpose yards, and All-American senior middle linebacker David Harris led the Wolverines with 6 tackles. Aside from his 2 touchdown passes, LeFevour had a rough day, completing only 17–36 passes for 153 yards and the interception that was returned for a touchdown. He was also sacked 4 times, and as a result had 8 carries for −21 yards. Linson led the CMU receiving unit with 6 catches for 87 yards and one touchdown, while Gardner added 3 catches for 54 yards and one touchdown. The CMU running game was abominable, averaging only 0.8 yards per carry. Sophomore Ontario Sneed led the way with 11 carries for 33 yards, but almost all those yards came off a 25-yard run. Otherwise, Michigan limited him to only 10 carries for 8 yards.

=== Notre Dame ===
Michigan at Notre Dame

Team	1	2	3	4	Total
• #11 Wolverines	20	14	6	7	47
#2 Fighting Irish	7	7	0	7	21

- Location: Notre Dame Stadium
  Notre Dame, IN
- Game start: 3:30 p.m. EST
- Elapsed time: 3:28
- Game attendance: 80,795
- Game weather: 82 °F (28 °C), Sunny, SE 12 MPH
- Referee: Dennis Lipski
- TV announcers (NBC): Tom Hammond (Play-by-play), Pat Haden (Color) & Lewis Johnson (Sideline)

Scoring summary
1	14:19	Michigan	Prescott Burgess 31-yard interception return (Garrett Rivas kick)	Michigan 7-0
1	10:16	Notre Dame	Ashley McConnell 3-yard pass from Brady Quinn (Carl Gioia kick)	Tie 7-7
1	3:53	Michigan	Mario Manningham 69-yard pass from Chad Henne (kick blocked)	Michigan 13-7
1	1:12	Michigan	Mike Hart 2-yard run (Garrett Rivas kick)	Michigan 20-7
2	11:26	Michigan	Mario Manningham 20-yard pass from Chad Henne (Garrett Rivas kick)	Michigan 27-7
2	2:30	Michigan	Mario Manningham 22-yard pass from Chad Henne (Garrett Rivas kick)	Michigan 34-7
2	0:20	Notre Dame	Jeff Samardzija 4-yard pass from Brady Quinn (Carl Gioia kick)	Michigan 34-14
3	5:20	Michigan	Garrett Rivas 20-yard field goal	Michigan 37-14
3	0:00	Michigan	Garrett Rivas 33-yard field goal	Michigan 40-14
4	12:41	Notre Dame	Rhema McKnight 28-yard pass from Brady Quinn (Carl Gioia kick)	Michigan 40-21
4	3:23	Michigan	LaMarr Woodley 54-yard fumble return (Garrett Rivas kick)	Michigan 47-21

In a nationally-televised game, Michigan routed the 2nd-ranked Fighting Irish of Notre Dame in South Bend, 47–21. Using a combination of an aggressive defense, a vertical passing combination of Chad Henne to Mario Manningham, and ball control running by Mike Hart, the Wolverines intercepted Irish quarterback Brady Quinn three times and completely frustrated the Irish. Irish running back Darius Walker ran for just 25 yards on ten carries. Henne, although intercepted once, was 13 for 22 and completed three touchdown passes to Manningham, who had four receptions for 137 yards. Steve Breaston provided most of the remainder of the passing attack with six catches for 42 yards. Hart had a touchdown and 124 yards rushing. Defenders LaMarr Woodley and Prescott Burgess had long returns for touchdowns on Irish turnovers. The final score was 47–21 in a break-out game for the Wolverines. The Wolverines gave Coach Lloyd Carr a Gatorade bath after the huge victory which boosted them in the rankings and put them in contention for a national title.

=== Wisconsin ===
Wisconsin at Michigan

Team	1	2	3	4	Total
Badgers	7	3	0	3	13
• #6 Wolverines	0	10	7	10	27

- Location: Michigan Stadium
  Ann Arbor, MI
- Game start: 12:00 p.m. EST
- Elapsed time: 3:17
- Game attendance: 111,058
- Game weather: 72 °F (22 °C), Rain likely, SW 7 MPH
- Referee: Dan Capron
- TV announcers (ESPN): Sean McDonough (Play-by-play), Chris Spielman (Color) & Rob Stone (Sideline)

Michigan entered the game ranked sixth nationally in the AP poll, while Wisconsin was unranked. The game marked the Big Ten opener for both teams. Wisconsin came into the game averaging nearly 200 yards rushing per game, but Michigan entered the game ranked number 1 in the nation in rushing defense, allowing only 21 yards per game. The Wolverine defense won this matchup, holding Wisconsin to just 12 rushing yards and 3 second half points. Mario Manningham caught seven passes for 113 yards and two touchdowns, giving him five in the past two weeks. Adrian Arrington had his best game to date, catching four passes for 79 yards.

=== Minnesota ===
Michigan at Minnesota

Team	1	2	3	4	Total
• #6 Wolverines	7	14	0	7	28
Golden Gophers	0	7	0	7	14

- Date: September 30
- Location: Hubert H. Humphrey Metrodome
  Minneapolis, MN
- Game start: 8:00 p.m. EST
- Elapsed time: 3:00
- Game attendance: 50,805
- Game weather: Indoors
- Referee: Bill LeMonnier
- TV announcers (ESPN): Mike Patrick (Play-by-play), Todd Blackledge (Color) & Holly Rowe (Sideline)

The Wolverines won their third straight revenge game, reclaiming the Little Brown Jug after losing it to the Gophers in 2005. This marked the first season since 1999 that Michigan made it through the month of September undefeated. The offense came out hot, scoring 21 points in the first half. Hart rushed for a season-high 195 yards on 31 carries, and Henne had another efficient game, completing 17 of 24 passes for 284 yards. Manningham had his third straight 100 yard game, while Arrington continued his emergence as Michigan's No. 2 receiver, scoring the first two touchdowns of the game. David Harris led the defense with nine tackles.

=== Michigan State ===
Michigan State at Michigan

Team	1	2	3	4	Total
Spartans	0	0	7	6	13
• #6 Wolverines	7	10	14	0	31

- Date: October 7
- Location: Michigan Stadium
  Ann Arbor, MI
- Game start: 4:30 p.m. EST
- Elapsed time: 3:05
- Game attendance: 111,349
- Game weather: 65 °F (18 °C), Sunny, ESE 7 MPH
- Referee: Dennis Lipski
- TV announcers (ESPN): Sean McDonough (Play-by-play), Chris Spielman (Color) & Rob Stone (Sideline)

Scoring summary
1	8:51	MICH	Adrian Arrington 13-yard pass from Chad Henne (Garrett Rivas kick)	MICH 7-0
2	13:15	MICH	Mario Manningham 41-yard pass from Chad Henne (Garrett Rivas kick)	MICH 14-0
2	3:25	MICH	Garrett Rivas 24-yard field goal	MICH 17-0
3	11:22	MICH	Mario Manningham 27-yard pass from Chad Henne (Garrett Rivas kick)	MICH 24-0
3	3:47	MSU	Jehuu Caulcrick 1-yard run (Brett Swenson kick)	MICH 24-7
3	0:55	MICH	Brandon Minor 40-yard run (Garrett Rivas kick)	MICH 31-7
4	7:18	MSU	Drew Stanton 2-yard run (run failed)	MICH 31-13

Michigan State suffered its third straight loss of the season as Michigan retained the Paul Bunyan Trophy for the fifth straight year. It was a mistake-filled game for the Spartans, who committed 11 penalties for a total loss of 87 yards. The Wolverines dominated the ground game on both sides of the ball, allowing 60 yards rushing on defense and gaining 211 yards on offense. Hart shared carries with both Kevin Grady and Brandon Minor, and the latter, a true freshman, broke a 40-yard run for the first touchdown of his career. Henne only attempted 17 passes, but three of them went for touchdowns, one to Arrington and the other two to Manningham. Leon Hall and Jamar Adams both intercepted passes from Drew Stanton, and Burgess had eight tackles, including the Wolverines' only sack of the afternoon.

=== Penn State ===
Michigan at Penn State

Team	1	2	3	4	Total
• #4 Wolverines	0	10	7	0	17
Nittany Lions	0	3	0	7	10

- Date: October 14
- Location: Beaver Stadium
  University Park, PA
- Game start: 8:00 p.m. EST
- Elapsed time: 2:58
- Game attendance: 110,007
- Game weather: 40 °F (4 °C), Clear, W 7 MPH
- Referee: Scott Pamon
- TV announcers (ABC): Brent Musburger (Play-by-play), Bob Davie (Color), Kirk Herbstreit (Color) & Lisa Salters (Sideline)

Michigan's defensive front seven was the story of the game, collecting seven sacks and holding the Nittany Lions to −14 net rushing yards. On a third-quarter pass play, Alan Branch knocked Penn State's quarterback Anthony Morelli out of the game with a concussion; Penn State's backup quarterback Daryl Clark was later injured on a rushing attempt. Third-string quarterback Paul Cianciolo managed to throw the Nittany Lions' only touchdown pass of the game. The game was a homecoming for Pennsylvania native Henne, who played the only game of his career at Penn State. With Manningham not playing due to a knee injury suffered against Michigan State, Arrington and Breaston caught the bulk of Henne's passes, each collecting five receptions. Hart picked up his sixth 100-yard rushing game of the season and scored the winning touchdown.

=== Iowa ===
Iowa at Michigan

Team	1	2	3	4	Total
Hawkeyes	0	0	6	0	6
• #2 Wolverines	0	3	7	10	20

- Date: October 21
- Location: Michigan Stadium
  Ann Arbor, MI
- Game start: 3:30 p.m. EST
- Elapsed time: 3:20
- Game attendance: 110,923
- Game weather: 55 °F (13 °C), Cloudy/Light Rain, WSW 10 MPH
- Referee: Dave Witvoet
- TV announcers (ABC): Brad Nessler (Play-by-play), Bob Griese (Color), Paul Maguire (Color) & Erin Andrews (Sideline)

The Hawkeyes gave Michigan one of its toughest contests of the year, staying within a touchdown well into the fourth quarter. After getting held to only 27 yards in the first half, Hart rushed for 99 in the second and scored the only two touchdowns of the game. Henne spread the ball out amongst his receivers with Manningham out, including Arrington, Breaston, and true freshman Greg Mathews. Arrington again was the Wolverines' leading receiver; the Iowa native caught eight passes for 79 yards. Offensive linemen Rueben Riley was injured in the second half, but was ably replaced by Justin Boren in the first meaningful time of the true freshman's career. Shawn Crable led the defense with three sacks on Iowa's senior quarterback Drew Tate. Woodley also picked up two sacks, bringing his total on the year to nine, good for fourth in the nation.

=== Northwestern ===
Northwestern at Michigan

Team	1	2	3	4	Total
Wildcats	0	0	3	0	3
• #2 Wolverines	7	3	7	0	17

- Date: October 28
- Location: Michigan Stadium
  Ann Arbor, MI
- Game start: 12:00 p.m. EST
- Elapsed time: 2:55
- Game attendance: 109,114
- Game weather: 42 °F (6 °C), Light Rain, SW 30 MPH
- Referee: Bill LeMonnier
- TV announcers (ESPN): Sean McDonough (Play-by-play), Chris Spielman (Color) & Rob Stone (Sideline)

On a cold, windy day, with Manningham still out, Michigan stuck with a conservative game plan against the Wildcats, throwing the ball only 20 times against 46 rushes. Northwestern, one week after losing to Michigan State in the largest comeback in Division I FBS history, turned the ball over five times to Michigan and were held to −13 yards on the ground. Hart led the offense with 95 yards, and in relief senior Jerome Jackson saw his first significant action of the season, gaining 59 yards on nine attempts. The defense had contributors from all positions: Defensive backs Hall and Willis Barringer each had interceptions, linebacker Harris had both a sack and an interception, and lineman Woodley had two sacks, forcing and recovering a fumble on one.

=== Ball State ===
Ball State at Michigan

Team	1	2	3	4	Total
Cardinals	9	3	7	7	26
• #2 Wolverines	7	17	7	3	34

- Date: November 4
- Location: Michigan Stadium
  Ann Arbor, MI
- Game start: 12:00 p.m. EST
- Elapsed time: 3:15
- Game attendance: 109,359
- Game weather: 42 °F (6 °C), Cloudy, S 7 MPH
- Referee: Bill LeMonnier
- TV announcers (ESPNU): Clay Matvick (Play-by-play), Mike Tomczak (Color) & Quint Kessenich (Sideline)

A game that Michigan was expected to win big – and in which it once held a big lead – turned into a surprisingly close affair. The Wolverines' offense uncharacteristically gave up a quick nine points to the Cardinals, coached by future Michigan head coach Brady Hoke, with Hart fumbling out of the Michigan end zone for a safety and Henne throwing an interception that was returned for a touchdown to give Ball State an early 9–7 lead. The Wolverines subsequently controlled the second and third quarters to build a 31–12 lead and seemed well in control of the game. However, the Michigan second-string defenders struggled to stop the Cardinal offense, and the first-string defense was forced to return late in the game to stave off a final Ball State drive. For the first time since its 2003 game against Houston, Michigan had a pair of 100-yard rushers: Hart with 154 on 25 carries, and Minor with 108 on 12 carries. Each scored a touchdown, as did Jackson, who gained 68 yards on six carries.

The Ball State game was notable for two other reasons: First, it was the 200th consecutive game with at least 100,000 people in attendance at Michigan Stadium. In addition, actor Patrick Stewart directed the Michigan Marching Band during their halftime performance in a salute to old-time television shows. Stewart was part of the Royal Shakespeare Company's fall 2006 residency at the University of Michigan, and directed the band to the theme from Star Trek. Upon being asked if he had any advice for the Wolverines for their upcoming Ohio State game, Stewart replied, "Boldly go and beat the Buckeyes. Make it so, number one!"

=== Indiana ===
Michigan at Indiana

Team	1	2	3	4	Total
• #2 Wolverines	14	7	13	0	34
Hoosiers	0	3	0	0	3

- Date: November 11
- Location: Memorial Stadium
  Bloomington, IN
- Game start: 3:30 p.m. EST
- Elapsed time: 2:44
- Game attendance: 42,320
- Game weather: 41 °F (5 °C), Cloudy, NE 10 MPH
- Referee: Steve Pamon
- TV announcers (ESPN): Dave Barnett (Play-by-play), Bill Curry (Color) & Heather Cox (Sideline)

Michigan jumped to an early lead with a touchdown pass to Adrian Arrington and a touchdown run by Mike Hart. Steve Breaston also had a big game with a 62-yard touchdown reception and an 83-yard punt return for a touchdown. Indiana allowed five sacks, and Michigan cornerback Leon Hall broke the school record for most deflected passes in a career. Michigan won 34–3.

=== Ohio State ===
Michigan at Ohio State

Team	1	2	3	4	Total
#2 Wolverines	7	7	10	15	39
• #1 Buckeyes	7	21	7	7	42

- Date: November 18
- Location: Ohio Stadium
  Columbus, OH
- Game start: 3:30 p.m. EST
- Elapsed time: 3:28
- Game attendance: 105,708
- Game weather: 48 °F (9 °C), Partly Cloudy, NE 1 MPH
- Referee: Bill LeMonnier
- TV announcers (ABC): Brent Musburger (Play-by-play), Bob Davie (Color), Kirk Herbstreit (Color) & Lisa Salters (Sideline)

On November 17, 2006, Bo Schembechler, the esteemed former coach of the Michigan Wolverines football program, died at the age of 77. He collapsed prior to taping his weekly college football preview show. His death came the day before one of the biggest games in the history of the Michigan–Ohio State football rivalry: the two teams both brought undefeated records to the game for the first time since 1973, and met as the #1- and #2-ranked teams for the first time in the 103-game history of the series.

In the game against the Ohio State Buckeyes, second-ranked Michigan received the ball to start the game and promptly scored a touchdown on a run by Mike Hart, the first of three he would score in the game. However, top-ranked Ohio State answered with a touchdown on its own initial drive, and dominated the rest of the half to take a 28–14 lead into intermission. Michigan scored on its first two possessions of the second half to close the deficit to four points, but could not wrest away the lead. The two teams exchanged touchdowns for the remainder, with each scoring twice; the Wolverines converted a two-point attempt to make the score 42–39 with less than three minutes remaining. A subsequent onside kick by the Wolverines was unsuccessful, and the Buckeyes came away with the victory. This game was significant in the BCS Bowl Line-up, as rather than being matched with the Buckeyes in the championship game, the Wolverines were matched in the Rose Bowl a record seventh time with the USC Trojans.

=== USC (Rose Bowl) ===
Southern Cal vs. Michigan

Team	1	2	3	4	Total
• #8 Trojans	3	0	16	13	32
#3 Wolverines	0	3	0	15	18

- Date: January 1
- Location: Rose Bowl
  Pasadena, CA
- Game start: 5:00 p.m. EST
- Elapsed time: 3:18
- Game attendance: 93,852
- Game weather: 66 °F (19 °C), Light Haze, Calm
- Referee: Jack Childress
- TV announcers (ABC): Brent Musburger (Play-by-play), Bob Davie (Color), Kirk Herbstreit (Color) & Lisa Salters (Sideline)

Michigan lost to the USC Trojans in the Rose Bowl Game on January 1, 2007. The game was tied 3–3 at the half but the high powered USC offense came out in the second half, giving USC the 32–18 victory.

== Statistical achievements ==
The team earned the Big Ten rushing defense statistical championships for all games by holding opponents to 43.4 yards per game. The team also earned the Big Ten rushing defense statistical championships for conference games by holding opponents to 50.9 yards per game. They were the conference leaders in quarterback sacks for conference games (3.3 sacks per game) and all games (3.3 sacks per game).

Garrett Rivas set the current Michigan Wolverines football records for career scoring (354), surpassing Anthony Thomas' 2000 record (336), field goals (64), surpassing Remy Hamilton's 1996 record (63), and point after touchdowns (162), surpassing J. D. Carlson's 1991 record (137). He has also tied Mike Gillette's 1988 record of 13 career 40-yard field goals.

== Personnel ==
=== Coaching staff ===
- Lloyd Carr – head coach – 27 years at U-M
- Mike DeBord – Offensive coordinator/tight ends – 11 years
- Ron English – Defensive coordinator/safeties – 4 years
- Erik Campbell – Wide receivers/assistant head coach – 12 years
- Fred Jackson – Running backs/associate head coach – 15 years
- Scot Loeffler – Quarterbacks – 5 years
- Andy Moeller – Offensive line – 7 years
- Steve Stripling – Defensive line – 2 years
- Steve Szabo – Linebackers – 1 year
- Ron Lee – Cornerbacks – 1 year

=== Roster ===
(as of October 15, 2006)
Quarterbacks: 7 Chad Henne – Junior; 8 Nick Sheridan – Freshman; 10 Jeff Ziegler – Freshman; 12 David Cone – Freshman; 13 Jeff Kastl – (redshirt) Senior; 19 Jason Forcier – (redshirt) Sophomore; Running backs: 3 Kevin Grady – Sophomore; 4 Brandon Minor – Freshman; 20 Mike Hart – Junior; 23 Carlos Brown – Freshman; 24 Jerome Jackson – Senior; 32 Mister Simpson – (redshirt) Freshman; Fullbacks: 25 Robbie Thornbladh – Freshman; 33 Mark Moundros – Freshman; 34 Will Paul – (redshirt) Junior; 39 Andre Criswell – (redshirt) Freshman; 40 Obi Oluigbo – (redshirt) Senior; Wide receivers: 2 Landon Smith – (redshirt) Junior; 13 Greg Mathews – Freshman; 14 Tyrone Jordan – (redshirt) Junior; 15 Steve Breaston – (redshirt) Senior; 16 Adrian Arrington – (redshirt) Sophomore; 17 Carl Tabb – (redshirt) Senior; 18 Antonio Bass – Sophomore; 18 Ben Wright – (redshirt) Sophomore; 26 Alijah Bradley – (redshirt) Senior; 81 Doug Dutch – (redshirt) Sophomore; 82 LaTerryal Savoy – (redshirt) Freshman; 86 Mario Manningham – Sophomore	Tight ends: 35 Brian Thompson – (redshirt) Senior; 42 Chris McLaurin – (redshirt) Freshman; 83 Mike Massey – (redshirt) Sophomore; 85 Carson Butler – (redshirt) Freshman; 88 Quintin Woods – Freshman; 89 Tyler Ecker – (redshirt) Senior; Offensive linemen: 52 Stephen Schilling – Freshman; 54 Mark Bihl – (redshirt) Senior; 57 Adam Kraus – (redshirt) Junior; 60 Patrick Lyall – (redshirt) Sophomore; 60 David Moosman – (redshirt) Freshman; 62 Tim McAvoy – (redshirt) Freshman; 62 Jon Saigh – (redshirt) Sophomore; 64 Grant DeBenedictis – (redshirt) Sophomore; 65 Justin Boren – Freshman; 70 Jeremy Ciulla – (redshirt) Sophomore; 71 Mark Ortmann – (redshirt) Freshman; 72 Rueben Riley – (redshirt) Senior; 73 Alex Mitchell – (redshirt) Sophomore; 74 Brett Gallimore – (redshirt) Sophomore; 75 Cory Zirbel – (redshirt) Freshman; 76 Mike Kolodziej – (redshirt) Senior; 77 Jake Long – (redshirt) Junior; 78 Justin Schifano – (redshirt) Freshman; 79 Perry Dorrestein – Freshman	Defensive ends: 50 Jeremy Van Alstyne – (redshirt) Senior; 55 Brandon Graham – Freshman; 56 LaMarr Woodley – Senior; 58 Tim North – (redshirt) Freshman; 90 Tim Jamison – Junior; 91 Rondell Biggs – (redshirt) Senior; 92 Greg Banks – Freshman; 96 Eugene Germany – (redshirt) Freshman; 99 Adam Patterson – Freshman; Defensive tackles: 44 James McKinney – (redshirt) Freshman; 63 Mike Knill – (redshirt) Junior; 67 Terrance Taylor – Sophomore; 80 Alan Branch – Junior; 93 Jason Kates – Freshman; 94 John Ferrara – Freshman; 95 Marques Walton – (redshirt) Sophomore; 97 Will Johnson – (redshirt) Sophomore; Linebackers: 2 Shawn Crable – (redshirt) Junior; 6 Prescott Burgess – Senior; 28 Dan Moore – (redshirt) Junior; 33 Cobrani Mixon – Freshman; 36 Quintin Patilla – Freshman; 37 Chris Graham – Junior; 44 Obi Ezeh – Freshman; 45 David Harris – (redshirt) Senior; 46 Brandon Logan – Sophomore; 49 John Thompson – (redshirt) Sophomore; 51 Max Pollock – (redshirt) Junior; 55 Ohene Opong-Owusu – (redshirt) Freshman	Cornerbacks: 4 Darnell Hood – (redshirt) Senior; 5 Charles Stewart – (redshirt) Sophomore; 14 Morgan Trent – (redshirt) Sophomore; 21 Gabe Morelli – (redshirt) Freshman; 22 Kyle Plummer – (redshirt) Junior; 25 Johnny Sears – (redshirt) Freshman; 27 Brandon Harrison – Sophomore; 27 Shakir Edwards – (redshirt) Sophomore; 28 Chris Richards – (redshirt) Freshman; 29 Leon Hall – Senior; Safeties: 8 Jonas Mouton – Freshman; 9 Anton Campbell – (redshirt) Junior; 12 Matt Hornaday – (redshirt) Freshman; 19 Willis Barringer – (redshirt) Senior; 21 Ryan Mundy – (redshirt) Junior; 22 Jamar Adams – Junior; 26 Mike Carl – (redshirt) Senior; 30 Stevie Brown – Freshman; 31 Brandent Englemon – (redshirt) Junior; 38 B.J. Opong-Owusu – (redshirt) Senior; Kickers: 34 Jason Gingell – (redshirt) Sophomore; 38 Garrett Rivas – Senior; 43 Bryan Wright – Freshman; 99 Sam Buckman – Freshman; 84 K.C. Lopata – (redshirt) Sophomore; 92 Jason Olesnavage – (redshirt) Freshman; Punters: 3 Ross Ryan – (redshirt) Senior; 41 Zoltan Mesko – (redshirt) Freshman; Long snappers: 59 Sean Griffin – (redshirt) Sophomore; 61 Turner Booth – (redshirt) Senior

== Awards and honors ==
- Mark Bihl – Rimington Trophy finalist
- Alan Branch – Ted Hendricks Award watchlist
- Steve Breaston – Biletnikoff Award watchlist, Maxwell Award watchlist, Walter Camp Award watchlist
- Prescott Burgess – Chuck Bednarik Award watchlist
- Lloyd Carr – George Munger Award semifinalist
- Tyler Ecker – John Mackey Award watchlist
- Leon Hall – Bronko Nagurski Trophy finalist, Jim Thorpe Award finalist, Lott Trophy quarterfinalist
- David Harris – Dick Butkus Award semifinalist
- Mike Hart – Doak Walker Award finalist, Maxwell Award semifinalist, Walter Camp Award watchlist
- Chad Henne – Maxwell Award semifinalist, Walter Camp Award watchlist, Davey O'Brien Award semifinalist, Manning Award finalist
- Jake Long – Outland Trophy watchlist
- Mario Manningham – Biletnikoff Award semifinalist
- Garrett Rivas – Lou Groza Award semifinalist
- LaMarr Woodley – Lombardi Award winner, Ted Hendricks Award winner, Chuck Bednarik Award finalist, Lott Trophy quarterfinalist, Outland Trophy watchlist, Bronko Nagurski Trophy watchlist
