= Lapeer East High School =

Location
- 933 South Saginaw Street; Lapeer, Michigan; United States; 43.039°N 83.304°W

Information
- Type: Public
- Established: 1975
- Closed: 2014
- Principal: Douglas Lindsay
- Faculty: 68.8 (on FTE basis)
- Grades: 9 to 12
- Enrollment: 1,499 (2006–07)
- Student to teacher ratio: 21.8:1
- Color: Green And Gold
- Mascot: Eagle
- Website: east.lapeerschools.org

Lapeer East High School was a public high school located in Lapeer, Michigan. It was the rival school of Lapeer West High School. In 2010, all portable classrooms were removed and the school was reverted to 9-12 grade students. It was built in 1975 as a result of overcrowding of the former Lapeer High School, which became Lapeer West High School. In 2014, Lapeer East was renamed to Lapeer High School due to the consolidation of the two high schools, the consolidation owing to declining enrollments at both high schools due to an increasingly low number of elementary and kindergarten enrollments.

== Notable alumni ==
- Jake Long - Former NFL player
