= Lapeer West High School =

Location
- Lapeer, Michigan; United States; 43.055655°N 83.341396°W

Information
- Type: Public
- Established: Current school 1961
- Closed: 2014
- School district: Lapeer
- Principal: Tim Zeeman
- Grades: 9–12
- Enrollment: Approx. 1000
- Campus size: Large
- Colors: Blue and gold
- Mascot: Panther
- Website: west.lapeerschools.org

Lapeer West High School was one of two public high schools in Lapeer, Michigan. It is on the west side of the M-24 highway.

Lapeer West High School was previously Lapeer High School. The current building opened in 1961; the previous high school, built in 1922, became White Junior High School, which closed in 1995. It took its current name upon the 1976 opening of Lapeer East High School.

Lapeer West closed at the end of the 2013–2014 school year as Lapeer Community Schools consolidated the faculties and student bodies of the two high schools into a single high school, which will be located on the Lapeer East campus. Today, the Lapeer West building is the Lapeer Community Schools' Center for Innovation, allowing students to take courses never before offered in their schools. Its athletic fields will remain the home of the Lapeer High School Lightning outdoor sports teams.

The Lapeer West Panthers won the 1995 MHSAA Class A football state championship with a 24–21 double-overtime victory over South Lyon High School.
