= Grand Rapids City League =

The Grand Rapids City League (GRCL) was a high school athletic league in Grand Rapids, Michigan. The GRCL originated in the spring of 1928 when seven Grand Rapids high schools competed in the first City Track Meet on May 18–19. The meet doubled as the Michigan High School Athletic Association (MHSAA) Class A Regional Meet. Catholic Central, Central, Creston, Davis Tech, Ottawa Hills, South and Union competed in the meet under the direction of newly appointed City League athletic director Henry Lightner. The league's final membership consisted of the four public high schools of the Grand Rapids Public Schools (Central, Creston, Ottawa Hills and Union) plus Catholic Central, West Catholic and Christian.

The last league secretary was Melvin Atkins, the Grand Rapids Public Schools' Executive Director of Athletics and Activities. This made the GRCL among the few athletic conferences administered by a public school district that has a significant non-public school membership.

Due to a lack of parity and competitiveness within the league because of changing enrollment figures and demographic shifts, the Grand Rapids City League had attempted in 2004 to disband and join the larger Ottawa-Kent Conference, which the majority of schools in metropolitan Grand Rapids are members of. The Ottawa-Kent Conference rejected the Grand Rapids Public Schools while extending an invitation to the three private schools. The member schools decided to keep the league intact and reapplied for Ottawa-Kent Conference membership in 2006. On February 8, 2007 the Ottawa-Kent Conference voted to invite the City League schools for membership. The 2007-2008 school year was the last year of competition for the City League as all schools accepted the invitation to join the Ottawa-Kent Conference.

== Members ==
The following high schools, all within the City of Grand Rapids, were the final members of the Grand Rapids City League:

- Grand Rapids Catholic Central High School
- Grand Rapids Central High School (earlier called Grand Rapids High School)
- Grand Rapids Christian High School
- Grand Rapids Creston High School
- Grand Rapids Ottawa Hills High School
- Grand Rapids Union High School
- Grand Rapids West Catholic High School

== Membership History ==
Davis Technical High School was a member of the Grand Rapids City League from the 1920s until 1943, when its building was turned over to Grand Rapids Junior College. Grand Rapids South High School, alma mater of former U.S. President Gerald R. Ford, was a league member until the school was closed in 1967.

Grand Rapids West Catholic High School was established in 1961, began varsity boys basketball a year later in 1962-1963 as an independent, and then joined the City League for the 1963-1964 school year. However, West Catholic's varsity football team did not have its first season until 1963-1964 and played as an independent for two years before entering league competition in 1965-1966.

Also, from 1964-1965 through 1971-1972, Grand Rapids Christian High School was divided into Central Christian and East Christian high schools. Central Christian joined the league in 1964-1965 and East Christian became a member in 1965-1966. The Central and East Christian football teams played as independents from their first years in 1967-1968 through their last seasons in 1971-1972. The reunited Grand Rapids Christian High began participation in the City League in 1972-1973, with the football team starting league play in 1973-1974.

The Grand Rapids City League's last competitions were held in the 2007-2008 school year. The league's member schools joined the Ottawa-Kent Conference prior to the 2008-2009 school year.

== State championships ==
Grand Rapids City League member high schools won the following state championships (all Michigan High School Athletic Association unless noted):

=== Grand Rapids Catholic Central Cougars ===
- 1943 football (mythical championship)
- 1949 football (Detroit Free Press & mythical championship)
- 1951 football (Detroit Free Press)
- 1959 football (Associated Press & Detroit Free Press)
- 1982 boys' cross country
- 1984 boys' cross country
- 1985 baseball
- 1987 football
- 1987 girls' cross country
- 1999 competitive cheer

=== Grand Rapids Central Rams ===
- 1896 football (mythical championship)
- 1900 boys' track and field (pre-MHSAA)
- 1907 boys' track and field (pre-MHSAA)
- 1912 football (mythical championship)
- 1913 boys' track and field (pre-MHSAA)
- 1916 boys' track and field (pre-MHSAA)
- 1917 boys' track and field (pre-MHSAA)
- 1931 boys' tennis
- 1932 boys' tennis
- 1932 football (mythical championship)
- 1933 boys' tennis

=== Grand Rapids Central Christian Eagles ===
- none

=== Grand Rapids Christian Eagles ===
- 1938 boys' basketball
- 1979 girls' cross country
- 1980 girls' track and field
- 1997 girls' basketball
- 1998 boys' soccer
- 2001 girls' team track and field (MITCA)
- 2001 boys' soccer
- 2002 girls' team track and field (MITCA)
- 2003 equestrian (MIHA)
- 2005 girls' cross country
- 2006 girls' cross country
- 2007 girls' team track and field (MITCA)

=== Grand Rapids Creston Polar Bears ===
- 1980 girls' volleyball

=== Grand Rapids Davis Technical ===
- 1945 Boys Tennis

=== Grand Rapids East Christian Panthers ===
- 1966 boys' basketball
- 1966 boys' cross country

=== Grand Rapids Ottawa Hills Indians/Bengals ===
- 1932 boys' track & field
- 1934 boys' track & field
- 1934 boys' golf
- 1934 boys' tennis
- 1938 boys' tennis
- 1951 boys' track & field
- 1952 boys' golf
- 1968 boys' basketball
- 1969 boys' basketball
- 1989 girls' basketball
- 1997 boys' basketball

=== Grand Rapids South Trojans ===
- 1924 football (mythical championship)
- 1928 boys' tennis
- 1929 boys' tennis
- 1930 boys' cross country
- 1944 football (mythical championship)

=== Grand Rapids Union Red Hawks ===
- 1925 football (mythical championship per Associated Press article)
- 1931 football (mythical championship)
- 1932 boys' golf
- 1948 football (Detroit Free Press & mythical championship)
- 1952 boys' cross country
- 1953 boys' cross country

=== Grand Rapids West Catholic Falcons ===
- 1979 girls' basketball
- 1984 gymnastics
- 1990 girls' basketball
- 2003 boys' cross country
- 2004 boys' team track and field (MITCA)
- 2008 boys' team track and field (MITCA)
- 2008 girls' team track and field (MITCA)

== Notable alumni ==
Notable alumni who participated athletically in the Grand Rapids City League (or participated for a school that later joined the City League) include the following:

- Thomas Kelley, Grand Rapids Union High School, Basketball, Michigan State University
- George Andrie, Catholic Central High School (Grand Rapids, Michigan), Football, Marquette University, Dallas Cowboys
- Lacy Jones, Grand Rapids Ottawa Hills High School, Basketball, Youngstown State, Central Michigan University
- Terry Barr, Grand Rapids Central High School, Football
- Harry Berrios, Grand Rapids Ottawa Hills High School, Baseball, Football
- Hugh Blacklock, Grand Rapids Central High School, Football
- Robert E Brady, Grand Rapids South High School, Football, basketball, track, Michigan State University
- Carlton Brewster, Grand Rapids Creston High School, Football
- Kelly Butler, Grand Rapids Union High School, Football, Purdue University
- Geno Carlisle, Grand Rapids Ottawa Hills High School, Basketball, University of California at Berkeley
- Chuck DeShane, Grand Rapids Creston High School, Football, Detroit Lions
- Doug DeVos, Grand Rapids Christian High School, Football, Purdue University
- Richard DeVos, Grand Rapids Christian High School
- Clarence Ellis, Grand Rapids Central High School, Football, Track and Field
- Gerald R. Ford, Grand Rapids South High School, Football
- David Harris, Grand Rapids Ottawa Hills High School, Football, University of Michigan, New York Jets
- Mike Kadish, Catholic Central High School (Grand Rapids, Michigan), Football
- Mike Keller, Catholic Central High School (Grand Rapids, Michigan), Football
- Stanley Ketchel, Grand Rapids Union High School, Boxing, World Champion
- George Kok, Grand Rapids Ottawa Hills High School, Basketball
- Alvin Loucks, Grand Rapids Union High School, Football
- Bob Lurtsema, Grand Rapids Ottawa Hills High School, Football, New York Giants
- Floyd Mayweather Jr., Grand Rapids Ottawa Hills High School
- Greg Meyer, Grand Rapids West Catholic High School, Cross Country, Track and Field, Boston Marathon, Olympics
- Rick Miller, Grand Rapids Union High School, Football, Basketball, Baseball
- Duke Mondy, Grand Rapids Catholic Central, Basketball, Providence, Oakland
- Mike Prindle, Grand Rapids Union High School, Football, Western Michigan University
- Rueben Riley, Grand Rapids Creston High School, Football
- Dave Rozema, Grand Rapids Central High School, Baseball, Detroit Tigers
- Joe Soboleski, Catholic Central High School (Grand Rapids, Michigan), Football
- Derrick Spearman, Grand Rapids Union High School, Football, Basketball, Baseball, Track, NLU
- Mickey Stanley, Grand Rapids Ottawa Hills High School, Baseball
- Frank Steketee, Grand Rapids Central High School, Football
