= Ottawa Hills High School (Michigan) =

High school in Grand Rapids, Michigan

Location
- 2055 Rosewood Avenue Southeast; Grand Rapids, (Kent County), Michigan 49506; United States

Information
- Type: Public high school
- Principal: Dr. Tim Mabin
- Enrollment: 402 (2023–2024)
- Colors: Orange and black
- Athletics conference: Ottawa-Kent Conference
- Nickname: Tigers

Ottawa Hills High School is a high school in Grand Rapids, Michigan. Ottawa Hills is one of five high schools of the Grand Rapids Public Schools. The school colors are orange and black, and the athletic teams are referred to as the Bengals. They were previously referred to as the Indians.

== History ==
On April 30, 1923 the Grand Rapids Board of Education voted to purchase two city blocks, about 6 acres (2.4 ha) of land, between Alexander Road and Iroquois and Cadillac Drives in Grand Rapids for $28,000. The original location for Ottawa Hills High School was to be built on this land, which was in the center of the new Ottawa Hills neighborhood being built on the former site of a golf course; the name was stipulated in the deed to the property. The original address of the school was 1900 Iroquois Drive, S.E., Grand Rapids.

Construction was started in 1924 and was finished the next spring. To carry out the Indian theme suggested by the name of the school, designs taken from Indian pottery, blankets, and rugs were used in a border about the main entrance, and directly above the door was an Indian head, which was later adopted as the symbol of the school.

In September 1925, the doors of Ottawa Hills High School opened to about 650 students and thirty teachers under the direction of the first principal, Henry D. MacNaughton. Many of the teachers came from Strong Junior High School, where they had taught with Mr. MacNaughton. The Students came primarily from Central and South High Schools. Grades 7-1 to 10-2 were included.

In 1931, the elementary wing was added to the building, two floors being used by the elementary grades, and a third floor by the high school. In 1939–40 the high school enrollment had reached 1,801, and the crowding increased as the elementary grades took over some of the rooms on the third floor. The congestion continued until 1953, when Mulick Park Elementary School opened, and the Ottawa Hills High School regained some of the much needed space.

In 1972, Ottawa Hills High School moved to its current location at 2055 Rosewood Avenue, S.E., site of the former Ridgeview Junior High School.

Circa 2013 the school had about forty teachers. GRPS was required to remove half of its teachers from their positions, and in the aftermath there was a shortage of permanent teachers. In 2014 the school had thirteen substitute teachers.

== Athletics ==
Ottawa Hills was a member of the Grand Rapids City League. They competed in this league along with three other public high schools and three private schools.

In 2008, the league disbanded and the City League schools joined the Ottawa-Kent Conference. Ottawa Hills now competes in the OK Gold.

When Creston and Grand Rapids Central High School were merged in 2013, and City High-Middle School relocated to the former Creston campus at the same time, many Creston student-athletes were invited to join their new Central classmates, as well as all City student-athletes residing east of the Grand River, on Ottawa Hills' athletic teams. (Central had discontinued interscholastic athletics in recent years.)

=== State championships ===
Ottawa Hills has won the following MHSAA athletic championships:

- 1932 boys track & field – Class A
- 1934 boys golf – Class A-B
- 1934 boys tennis – Class A-B (tied)
- 1934 boys track & field – Class A
- 1938 boys tennis – Class A
- 1939 wrestling - Class A
- 1951 boys track & field – Class A
- 1952 boys golf – Class A
- 1968 boys basketball – Class A
- 1969 boys basketball – Class A
- 1989 girls basketball – Class A
- 1997 boys basketball – Class A

=== State Runners-up ===
- 1977 boys track and field – Class A

=== Grand Rapids City League Football Championships (since 1950) ===
- 1964 (tied)
- 1967 (tied)
- 1970 (tied)
- 1980 (tied)
- 1981
- 1984
- 1990
- 1992 (tied) – 4th Place, Final Associated Press Poll
- 1996

== Notable alumni ==
- Sam Beal, NFL player
- Harry Berrios, professional baseball player
- Marcus Bingham Jr. (born 2000), basketball player for Hapoel Haifa of the Israeli Basketball Premier League
- Jeffrey Daniel, member, R&B group Shalamar
- Bobby DeBarge, member, R&B group Switch
- Bunny DeBarge, singer and songwriter
- Chico DeBarge, R&B singer
- James DeBarge, R&B singer
- Don Eaddy, MLB player
- Rob Ellis, former MLB player
- Benjamin F. Engel, US Coast Guard
- David Harris, New York Jets NFL football player and 2006 Dick Butkus Award finalist at the University of Michigan
- Adina Howard, R&B singer
- Jimmy Jackson, Olympic wrestler and Pan American Games wrestling champion
- George Kok, professional basketball player
- Bob Lurtsema, NFL player
- Floyd Mayweather Jr., boxing champion
- Jeff Mayweather, boxing trainer
- Patrick Miles Jr., attorney, former Harvard classmate and Harvard Law Review colleague of U.S. President Barack Obama
- Marshall Purnell, architect, former President, The American Institute of Architects
- Marvin Sapp, Gospel singer / former lead singer of Gospel group Commissioned
- Mickey Stanley, MLB player for 1968 World Series champion Detroit Tigers
