= Rick Miller (baseball) =

American baseball player (born 1948)

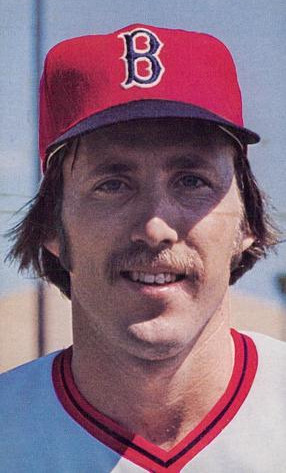
- Outfielder
- Born: April 19, 1948 (age 78); Grand Rapids, Michigan, U.S.
- Batted: Left Threw: Left

MLB debut
- September 4, 1971, for the Boston Red Sox

Last MLB appearance
- October 6, 1985, for the Boston Red Sox

MLB statistics
- Batting average: .269
- Home runs: 28
- Runs batted in: 369
- Stats at Baseball Reference

Teams
- Boston Red Sox (1971–1977); California Angels (1978–1980); Boston Red Sox (1981–1985)

Career highlights and awards
- Gold Glove Award (1978)

Richard Alan (Rick) Miller (born April 19, 1948) is an American former outfielder in Major League Baseball from 1971 to 1985. Miller attended Union High School (Grand Rapids, Michigan) and was a star athlete in the Grand Rapids City League before playing collegiate ball for the Michigan State Spartans. On September 4, 1971, Miller, at the age of 23, broke into the big leagues with the Boston Red Sox. He spent 12 of his 15 seasons as a member of the Red Sox, he also played with the California Angels. Miller was an accomplished fielder who won a Gold Glove in 1978 for his play in center field.

He was traded along with Carney Lansford and Mark Clear from the Angels to the Red Sox for Rick Burleson and Butch Hobson on December 10, 1980.

In a 15-year career covering 1482 games, Miller compiled a .269 batting average (1046-for-3887) with 552 runs, 28 home runs and 369 RBI. Defensively, he recorded a .986 fielding percentage at all three outfield positions and first base. In the postseason, in the 1975 World Series and 1979 American League Championship Series, he batted .222 (4-for-18) with 2 runs scored.

In 2007, Miller was named as the manager of the Nashua Pride of the Canadian American Association of Professional Baseball, a team he managed through the end of the 2008 season. In 2012, he was named the manager of the New Bedford Bay Sox of the New England Collegiate Baseball League.

Miller is the brother in law of former teammate Carlton Fisk, having married Fisk's sister Janet.

Sporting positions
Preceded by Butch Hobson	Nashua Pride manager 2008	Succeeded by Brian Daubach (American Defenders of New Hampshire)
