= Drew Neitzel =

American basketball player

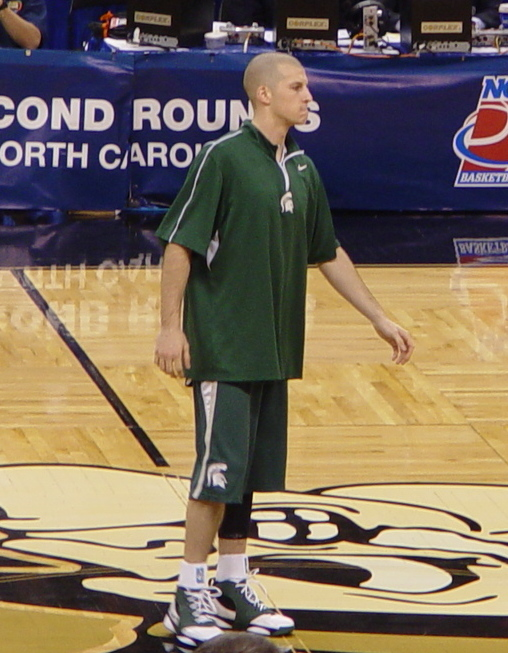

Personal information
- Born: May 7, 1985 (age 41) Grand Rapids, Michigan, U.S.
- Listed height: 5 ft 11 in (1.80 m)
- Listed weight: 185 lb (84 kg)

Career information
- High school: Wyoming Park (Wyoming, Michigan)
- College: Michigan State (2004–2008)
- NBA draft: 2008: undrafted
- Playing career: 2008–2013
- Position: Point guard

Career history
- 2008–2009: Artland Dragons
- 2009: Élan Chalon
- 2010: TBB Trier
- 2011: BBC Bayreuth
- 2011–2012: Texas Legends
- 2012–2013: BBC Monthey

Career highlights
- AP Honorable mention All-American (2007); First-team All-Big Ten – Coaches (2008); Second-team All-Big Ten – Media (2008); Fourth-team Parade All-American (2004); Mr. Basketball of Michigan (2004)

Drew Neitzel (born May 7, 1985) is an American former professional basketball player. He played college basketball for the Michigan State Spartans.

== Basketball career ==
=== High school ===
Neitzel attended Wyoming Park High School in Wyoming, Michigan. He holds the school career records for points (2,462) and assists (692), while ranking second in the state in assists and sixth in scoring. Graduating in 2004, Neitzel received many honors and awards, including the 2004 Mr. Basketball of Michigan. He was also awarded membership on the 2004 Detroit Free Press and The Detroit News Dream Team, Associated Press Class B Player of the Year, 2004 fourth-team Parade All-American, and Class B Academic All-State. His single game high scoring effort was against Hudsonville in 2003 when he scored 57 points.

=== College ===
Neitzel started his college basketball career in 2004–05. He appeared in 33 games, starting 14 of the final 15 contests. Ranked second on the team with 97 assists (2.9 per game) and an assist-to-turnover ratio of 2.06-to-1, he led all Big Ten freshmen in assists and led the Michigan State Spartans in assists in seven games. He was also named to the Big Ten All-Freshmen Team. He was a key part of a Spartan team that reached the Final Four, losing to eventual champion North Carolina.

During the 2005–06 season Neitzel started all 34 games at point guard averaging 8.3 points per contest and ranking third in the Big Ten in assists (5.56) first in assist-to-turnover ratio (2.86) and sixth in 3-point field-goal percentage (.404). Neitzel started 35 of 36 games in 2006–07, averaging 35.7 minutes per game and 18.1 ppg to lead the team. He led the Big Ten in free-throw percentage (.879) and in 3-point field goals made (3.26 pg).

On February 28, 2007, Neitzel was named First-Team All-District 11 by the National Association of Basketball Coaches. This honor made him eligible for the All-American Teams at the end of the season.

As of March 6, 2007 Neitzel was named to the First-Team All-Big Ten. Neitzel finished the regular season averaging 18.3 points per game, ranking fourth in the Big Ten. In conference games, he ranked third in scoring (18.3 ppg). He leads the conference in free-throw percentage (.884) and 3-point field goals made (3.2 per game), and ranks among the leaders in minutes played (2nd, 35.3 mpg) and assists (6th, 4.1 apg). He scored 20 or more points in 15 games, and averaged 25.8 points against the top two teams in the league, Ohio State and Wisconsin. He was selected as the Big Ten's Player of the Week three times (Nov. 20, Nov. 27 and Feb. 26) and was named National Player of the Week by ESPN.com's Andy Katz on Feb. 26. Among his other accolades, Neitzel was chosen to the John R. Wooden Award Midseason All-America team, and is one of 22 players who will appear on the final national ballot. His last game at Michigan State was against the Memphis Tigers in the Sweet Sixteen of the 2008 NCAA Men's Basketball Tournament.

In the 2007–08 season he averaged 13.9 ppg and averaged 35.2 minutes per game, starting in 35 of 36 games. He led the Big Ten and ranked seventh in the nation in assist-to-turnover ration (2.84) and ranked fourth in assists (4.03 apg), free-throw percentage (.860), and 3-point field goals made (2.69 pg). He was named to the Academic All-Big Ten team in 2005–06, 2006–07, and 2007–08, and was second team All-American in 2006-07 and second-team Academic All-American in 2007–08.

Neitzel is MSU's all-time leader in career free-throw percentage (.866). He ranks among the Spartan career leaders in assists (4th, 582), 3-point field goals made (3rd, 273) and 3-point field-goal attempted (3rd, 684), points (14th, 1,534), games played (2nd, 138) and games started (t-5th, 117). He is one of just three players in Michigan State history and 12 players in Big Ten history with 1,500 points and 500 assists. He finished 10th in career assists in Big Ten history (582).

=== Professional career ===
After not being drafted in the 2008 NBA draft, Neitzel agreed to play with the Minnesota Timberwolves' summer league team. In the summer of 2008, he signed with German Basketball Bundesliga (first division) team Artland Dragons and played for the team as a combo guard.

Neitzel played for the Portland Trail Blazers during the 2009 summer league.

For the 2009–2010 season, he played with Élan Sportif Chalonnais, based in Chalon-sur-Saône, France. He averaged 34 minutes, 11.7 points per game and a 2.7 to 1 assist to turnover ratio.

Neitzel played in Germany in 2010–11, averaging 7.7 points, 3.4 assists and 1.4 rebounds in 16 games for BBC Bayreuth.

Neitzel was put on the 2011-2012 Dallas Mavericks training camp roster. It was confirmed on Sunday December 11, 2011 that Drew Neitzel had been acquired by the defending champs Mavericks. He was waived on December 21.

== After basketball ==
Neitzel is currently working as a financial advisor for Wells Fargo in Grand Rapids, Michigan since retiring from basketball.
