= Innovation Central High School =

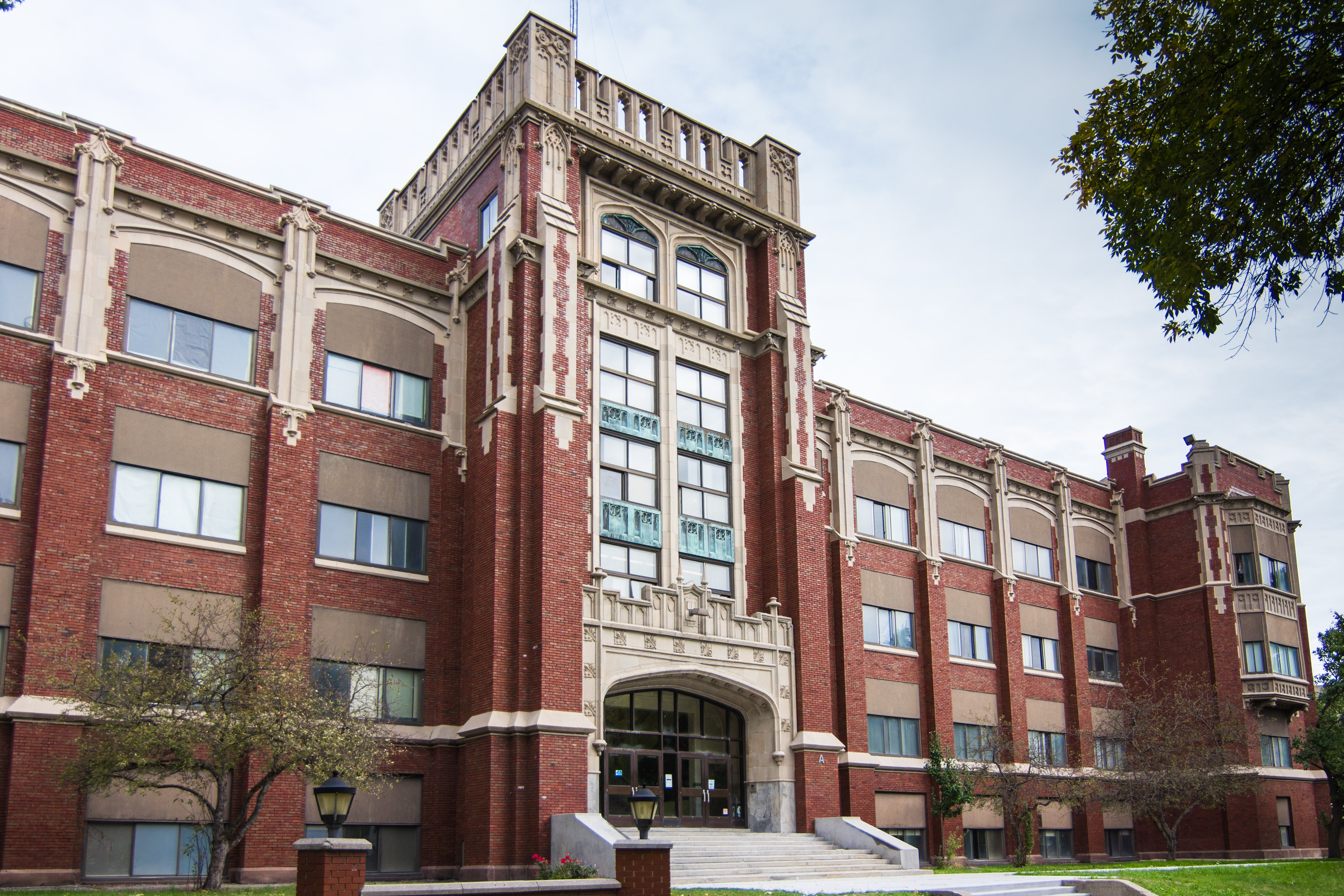
- Central High School in 2015

Location
- 421 Fountain St NE, Grand Rapids, Michigan; United States; 42.9658°N 85.6585°W

Information
- Former name: Central High School
- Type: public
- Established: 1849
- School district: Grand Rapids Public Schools
- Principal: Derrick Martin
- Faculty: 37.70 (FTE)
- Grades: 9–12
- Enrollment: 722 (2018–19)
- Student to teacher ratio: 19.15
- Colors: Gold and Black
- Teams: Rams
- Website: https://grps.org/schools/high-school/innovation-central-hs/
- Michigan State Historic Site

Innovation Central High School, founded in 1849 as Grand Rapids High School, is a public high school located at 421 Fountain Street NE in Grand Rapids, Michigan. The high school offers classes for grades 9–12. The school colors are Gold and Black, and the school mascot is the Ram.

== History ==
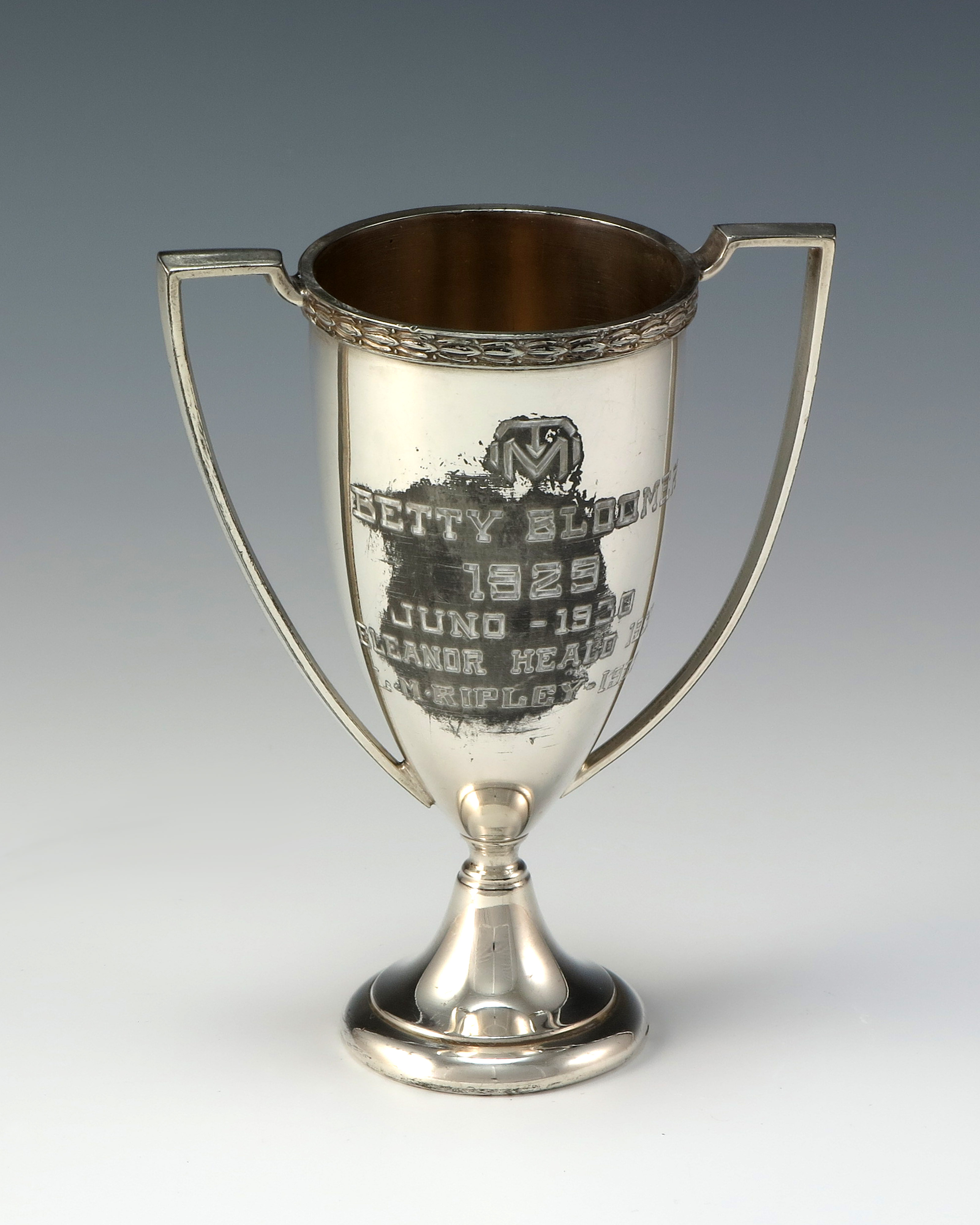
Silver, loving cup tennis trophy awarded to Betty Bloomer from Central High School. Engraving reads, "TM / Betty Bloomer / 1929 / Juno - 1930 / Eleanor Heald - 1931/ L-M-Ripley - 1932."

A previous school known as Grand Rapids High School was opened in 1849, and located in an old stone schoolhouse. New buildings were constructed in 1867 and 1893. A new school was constructed from 1910–1911, at a cost of US$435,000, and opened to students on January 31, 1911. The initial class incorporated students from grades 9 through 12, and some courses that eventually evolved into Grand Rapids Community College, which was itself founded in 1914. The high school had a large auditorium, the largest in Michigan at the time that the school was built, so famous figures such as presidents Teddy Roosevelt and William Howard Taft have spoken there. In 1947, the school's football team won the state championship.

In 2013, Central High School consolidated with Creston High School, with the consolidated high school now located on the Central High School campus. Creston High School's former campus became that of City High-Middle School from that year onward. In 2014, the school was renamed the Innovation Central High School along with the consolidation of the district's other career-oriented programs.

== Notable alumni ==
- Terry Barr (1935-2009), football player for the Detroit Lions
- Hugh Blacklock (1893-1954), NFL player
- John Melville Burgess (1909-2003), diocesan bishop of Massachusetts and the first African American to head an Episcopal diocese.
- Roger B. Chaffee (1935-1967), astronaut
- Rex Cherryman (1896-1928), actor
- S. B. Conger (1872-1934), journalist
- Robert Dean (Michigan politician) (b. 1954), member of the Michigan House of Representatives
- Arthur Carter Denison (1861-1942), federal judge
- Clarence Ellis (b. 1950), football player for the Atlanta Falcons
- Betty Ford (1918-2011), former First Lady, wife of President Gerald Ford
- Arnold Gingrich (1903-1976), editor
- Paul G. Goebel (1901-1988), mayor
- Ralph Hauenstein (1912-2016), United States Army officer, newspaper editor
- Julius Houseman (1832-1891), politician
- Charles Leonard (1913-2006), general
- Buster Mathis (1943-1996), boxer
- Thomas Francis McAllister, Federal judge
- Gordon Scott (1926-2007), actor who portrayed Tarzan
- Leo Sowerby (1895-1968), composer
- Frank Steketee (1900-1951), football player for the University of Michigan Wolverines
- Arthur Vandenberg (1884-1951), Republican senator who participated in the creation of the United Nations
- Gilbert White (1877-1931), American painter
- Stewart Edward White (1873-1946), author
- Elizabeth Wilson (1921-2015), actress
