= KISD =

KISD may refer to:

- Kilgore Independent School District
- Köln International School of Design in Cologne, Germany
- KISD (FM), a radio station (98.7 FM) licensed to Pipestone, Minnesota, United States
- Independent School Districts in Texas - K
- Kent Intermediate School District, an intermediate school district in Kent County, Michigan, United States
