= Wyoming High School =

Wyoming High School may refer to:

- Wyoming High School (Michigan) in Wyoming, Michigan, a suburb of Grand Rapids
- Wyoming High School (Ohio) in Wyoming, Ohio, a suburb of Cincinnati
- Wyoming Area High School of the Wyoming Area School District in Exeter, Luzerne, Pennsylvania
