= Noorthoek Academy =

Non-profit giving college education for mentally-impaired students

Joseph Noorthoek; the Namesake of the Noorthoek Academy, Photo circa 1940

Noorthoek Academy is a non-profit organization dedicated to providing a college education program in the arts and sciences for students with mental impairments. Noorthoek was founded in 1989 and named after Joseph Noorthoek, a former member of the board of education for Grand Rapids Public Schools whom the academy decided to recognize for his leadership and understanding. The academy is partnered with Grand Rapids Community College and offers its students the opportunity to earn continuing education unit credits for each semester they complete. Admission is offered to students based on their maturity, motivation, and behavior, as well as their estimated benefit from the curriculum; students who are accepted may attend as many semesters as they desire.

Noorthoek's curriculum is designed to facilitate exploration of the natural sciences, history, literature, drama, music, current events, and creative writing, among others. These presentations are designed for students classified as educable mentally impaired (EMI). The academy attempts to supplement its curriculum via community resources, such as local museums, theaters, and libraries.
