= Grand Rapids Public Schools =

Public school district in Grand Rapids, Michigan, USA

Address
- 1331 Martin Luther King Dr. SE Grand Rapids, Kent, Michigan, 49506; United States

District information
- Grades: Pre-Kindergarten-12
- Superintendent: Dr. Leadriane Roby
- Schools: 51
- Budget: $304,711,000 2022-2023 expenditures
- NCES District ID: 2616440

Students and staff
- Students: 13,692 (2024-2025)
- Teachers: 839.27 FTE (2024-2025)
- Staff: 2,317.17 FTE (2024-2025)
- Student–teacher ratio: 16.31 (2024-2025)

Other information
- Website: grps.org

Grand Rapids Public Schools is a public school district in Grand Rapids, Michigan. By enrollment, it is the eighth largest district in Michigan as of the 2023-2024 school year.

== History ==
=== Legal history ===
Grand Rapids Public Schools was created in 1871, when the state legislature passed an act creating the Board of Education of the City of Grand Rapids. According to the act, the boundaries of the district were the same as the boundaries of the City of Grand Rapids. Prior to that time, the City of Grand Rapids had not established one single school district. Rather, the west side was known as the Union School District and the east side of the Grand River was served by two other districts.

In the days following 1871, the matters of the public schools and the matters of the city were much more intertwined than they are today since the school board's budget had to be submitted to the city for approval. In that time, when city boundaries were expanded, school boundaries expanded as well. The Constitution of 1908 prohibited special and local acts, so the city was expanded through annexation until the 1920s when the codified school law became more distinct. In 1962, the law stating that the boundaries for the city and the school district must be the same was repealed. Since then, enlargement of the city has not resulted in the expansion of the boundaries within the Grand Rapids Public Schools school district.

The relationship between GRPS and the city is very different than it was one hundred years ago. The city no longer has any control over the school budget, the district's bonding powers, or its borrowing powers. Currently, the city's basic responsibility is to conduct school elections and to collect school tax after the school board has determined how much tax should be levied. The legislature has continued to require that cities and schools operate separately.

=== School board history ===
Prior to May 1906, the board of education had twenty-five members. Two of these members were elected from each of the twelve wards of the city, and the Mayor of Grand Rapids served as an ex-officio member. The election process was responsible for the poor location of many schools in Grand Rapids. Many schools were located according to a specific ward, rather than according to the needs of the city. In May 1906, the membership of the board was decreased to nine. Each member is now elected by the residents of the city as a whole and serves on the board for a three-year term.

Originally, the board occupied space on the first floor of City Hall, but by 1915 had complete use of the fourth floor of the building. Additional offices were located in the old North Division School at 234 North Division Avenue and the old Junior College Building on Ransom Avenue. The maintenance department was located at 425 West Pleasant Street in the former Pleasant Street School. In June 1920, the Board moved all its offices to the fifth floor of a new addition to the George A. Davis Vocational and Technical High School. This building later transitioned into the West Junior College Building. The new addition was specifically designed to hold these offices. One important factor in construction of the administrative offices was a 1927 City Commission imposed rental fee of $5,000 per year for the use of the space in City Hall. Prior to this time, the space had been rent free. However, the main factor for construction was increased efficiency and a desire to have all administrative personnel at one location.

=== Administrative history ===
Administratively, the board initially used a dual system of control, where the superintendent of schools and the business manager were each directly responsible to the board. In 1937, the chief engineer also became responsible directly to the board of education; the chief engineer previously reported to the business manager.

On March 2, 1959, the administrative structure was changed so the superintendent of schools was the only employee directly responsible to the board. The business manager was placed under the superintendent of schools, and the Chief Engineer was assigned to report to the business manager.

In 2012 Theresa Weatherall Neall, the superintendent, received the approval from every member of the school board to save over $22.4 million in a five year period by closing ten school buildings.

=== Facilities History ===
By the 1850s, there were two union school districts in the city, one on either side of the river. The first Grand Rapids high school on the east side was built in 1859. It was replaced by another building, known as the Old Stone School, in 1867. An additional building was built in 1893. Both buildings were replaced in 1911 by Grand Rapids Central High School, known today as Innovation Central High School.

The west side of Grand Rapids organized a union school district in 1853 and built a wooden school that year. It was replaced two years later by a stone building on the south side of 4th Street NW between Broadway Avenue NW and Turner Avenue NW. The building was replaced by Union High School in 1897 as Grand Rapids' second high school. Union High School was replaced by the current building in September 1967.

South High School opened at 100 Hall St. SE in 1917. President Gerald Ford graduated from the school in 1931. It closed as a high school in 1968 and operated as a junior high school until 1981. As of 2018 it is the Gerald R. Ford Jobs Corps Center, operated by the United States Department of Labor.

When South High School closed at the end of the 1967-1968 school year, its students were bused to other district high schools. About 300 African-American South High students joined Union High School's student body, which was mostly white at the time. In fall 1968, several incidents of racial violence resulted in school closures and arrests at Union. As documented by the editors of the school yearbook, "1968-1969 was a year of change... Union became an integrated school. Unfortunately, this plan was not peacefully settled here... Some students were arrested, some were suspended, and some were hurt. School was dismissed early for Christmas and another round of discussions involving faculty, parents, and students were held. Changes were made: such as stricter enforcement of existing rules, worried parents in the halls patrolling, and the resignation of our principal."

Creston High School was built in 1923. It closed in 2013 and reopened as City High-Middle School that fall.

The first Ottawa Hills High School was built in 1924 at 1050 Iriquois Drive SE. It became Iroquois Middle School when the current Ottawa Hills High School opened in 1975. The building closed in 2005 and was torn down around 2009.

C.A. Frost Environmental Science Middle/High School, an application-based school with a curriculum focused on science, opened in fall 2016 in the former Covell Elementary.

Southwest Middle High School/Academia Bilingüe, a Spanish-language immersion middle/high school, opened in 2020. The architect was TMP Associates.

== Schools ==
GRPS offers a large selection of school choices, including neighborhood, theme, Center of Innovation, special education, and charter. Neighborhood schools provide students with a traditional education. Located throughout the city, these schools are open to all students living within a specific attendance area. Pilot programs in select neighborhood schools are working to improve the connection between neighborhood residents and their local school.

Theme schools take the traditional curriculum and apply a theme to create a unique curriculum. Examples of themes available at GRPS include environmental science, arts and music, global studies, leadership, Montessori, International Baccalaureate, and more. In many GRPS theme schools, students also experience place based learning and thematic extracurricular activities. Of the theme schools, four require students to test-in. City High Middle School, one of the test-in schools, consistently ranks as the top performing school in West Michigan. Additionally, it is also ranked among the top schools in the state by U.S. News & World Report, and The Washington Post. By 2017 additional students were enrolling in theme schools.

Centers of Innovation are public-private partnerships that give students opportunities to connect with professional mentors. Furthermore, the Centers of Innovation offer job shadowing and internships, as well as the potential to earn college or trade school credits or career certification to prepare for in-demand careers.

GRPS also provides center-based special education services for students from throughout the Kent Intermediate School District (KISD). Students qualify for these services through the IEP team process. Additionally, GRPS has one charter elementary school, Grand Rapids Child Discovery Center. Schools may also offer services for English language learners; "community schools" with social, health, and mental health services; all-day preschool; and all-day kindergarten.

Schools in Grand Rapids Public Schools
School	Address	Type	Built	Notes
Elementary Schools (Grades PreK-5)
Brookside Elementary	2505 Madison Ave. SE	Neighborhood	1954	
Buchanan Elementary	1775 Buchanan Ave. SW	Neighborhood		
Burton Elementary	2133 Buchanan Ave. SW	Neighborhood		Also site of Burton Middle School.
Campus Elementary	710 Benjamin Ave. SE	Neighborhood		
CA Frost Environmental Science Academy Elementary	1460 Laughlin Dr. NW	Theme		
Cesar E. Chavez Elementary	1205 César E. Chávez Ave. SW	Neighborhood		
Coit Creative Arts Academy	617 Coit Ave. NE	Theme		
Congress Elementary	940 Baldwin St. SE	Neighborhood		
Grand Rapids Montessori Academy	159 College Ave. NE	Theme	1918	Grades PreK-6
Ken-O-Sha Park Elementary	1353 Van Auken St.SE	Neighborhood		
Kent Hills Elementary	1445 Emerald Ave. NE	Neighborhood		
Mulick Park Elementary	1761 Rosewood Ave. SE	Neighborhood		
Palmer Elementary	309 Palmer St. NE	Neighborhood	1954	
Ridgemoor Park Montessori School	2555 Inverness Rd. SE	Montessori		Former Ridgemoor Park Child Development Center
Sibley Elementary	943 Sibley St. NW	Neighborhood		
Southwest Elementary School - Academia Bilingüe	801 Oakland Ave. SW	Theme		Grades K-6. Spanish/English immersion program.
K–8 Schools
Aberdeen Academy	928 Aberdeen St. NE	Neighborhood	1929	
Dickinson Academy	448 Dickinson St. SE	Neighborhood		
Gerald R. Ford Academic Center	851 Madison Ave. SE	Theme		
Harrison Park	1440 Davis Ave. NW	Neighborhood		
Martin Luther King, Jr. Leadership Academy	645 Logan St. SE	Neighborhood		
North Park Montessori	3375 Cheney Ave. NE	Theme	1908	
Shawmut Hills	2550 Burritt St. NW	Neighborhood		
Sherwood Park Global Studies Academy	3859 Chamberlain Ave. SE	Theme	1969	
Middle Schools (Grades 6-8)
Blandford School	3143 Milo St. NW	Theme		6th grade only. Outdoor education program.
Burton Middle School	2133 Buchanan Ave. SW	Neighborhood		Shares a building with Burton Elementary.
Center for Economicology	1720 Plainfield Ave. NE	Theme		6th grade only
Public Museum Middle School	272 Pearl St. NW	Theme		
Westwood Middle School	1525 Mount Mercy Dr. NW	Neighborhood	1960	
Zoo School	1300 W. Fulton St.	Theme		6th grade only
High Schools
CA Frost Environmental Science Middle High School	1417 Covell Ave. NW	Theme		Grades 6-12.
City High-Middle School	1720 Plainfield Ave. NE	Theme	1923	Grades 7–12
Grand Rapids Montessori Middle High School	421 Fountain St NE	Theme		Grades 7-12
Grand Rapids Public Museum High School	54 Jefferson Ave. SE	Theme	2018	
Grand Rapids University Preparatory Academy	512 Division Ave S	Theme	2008	Grades 6-12
Innovation Central High School	421 Fountain St. NE	Theme	1911	
Ottawa Hills High School	2055 Rosewood Ave. SE	Neighborhood	1975	
Southwest Middle High School - Academia Bilingüe	327 Rumsey Ave. SW	Theme	2020	Spanish/English immersion program. Grades 7-12.
Southeast Career Pathways	1250 Sigsbee St SE	Alternative	2025	
Union High School	1800 Tremont Blvd. NW	Neighborhood	1967	

=== Former schools ===
Secondary

- Creston High School closed 2014
- Central High School, closed 2014
- South High School, closed 1968
- Adelante High School (alternative school)
- Riverside Middle School
- Alger Middle School

Primary

- Alexander Elementary School - Closed in 2010
- Campau Park Elementary School - The 3.14-acre (1.27 ha) property included a 37,803-square-foot (3,512.0 m^{2}) school building. At the end of its life, it had approximately 220 students which was 52% of the school's official building capacity. At the time the State of Michigan considered the school a "priority school" meaning its academic performance was poor. The school closed in 2013. Covenant House Michigan acquired the school building in 2013 for $400,000. Since July 2013 the building served as the Covenant House Academy Grand Rapids.
- Covell Elementary School - It closed in 2013, with Stocking Elementary School, another campus previously closed, re-opening in its place. In 2016 the building was repurposed as the grade 6-10 campus of the C.A. Frost Environmental Science Academy.
- Heritage Child Development Center - In 2008 an Islamic organization, Masjid Muhammad Islamic Center, offered to purchase the building.
- Eastern Elementary School - Bruce Michael, the head of Berkley, Michigan-based Ojibway Development LLC, purchased the school from GRPS. He sold the building to National Heritage Academies, a charter school operator, on February 10, 2012. The district board believed it would be turned into apartments.
- Hillcrest Elementary School - The district sold the campus for $375,000 to Living Stones Academy. The sale occurred in 2014.
- Lexington Elementary School - Michael, who initially announced plans to make 25 apartment units out of this school, also sold this building to National Heritage on February 10, 2012. The district board believed it would be turned into apartments.
- Oakdale Elementary School - Michael also sold this building to National Heritage on February 10, 2012. The district board believed it would be turned into apartments. It became a charter school, River City Scholars Charter Academy. In 2012 the Mayor George Heartwell accused the developer of misleading the district.
- Ottawa Hills Elementary and Iroquois Middle School - The school opened in 1925 as Ottawa Hills High School, and became Iroquois Middle School and Ottawa Hills Elementary in 1957. Both closed in 2005. In December of 2008 the building was purchased by the Grand Rapids Christian Schools and demolished in 2009.
- Park School - A Head Start program formerly occupied the building. Kent County Land Bank offered to buy the facility in 2016 so the organization Dwelling Place could develop apartments.
- Pine Elementary School - Opened in 1948, later housed Pine Academy, and closed in 2010 Kent County Land Bank offered to buy the facility in 2016 so the organization Dwelling Place could develop apartments.
- Ridgemoor Park Child Development Center - Became Ridgemoor Park Montessori
- Shawnee Park Math/Science/Technology Academy - The building, with grades K-5, had a capacity of 600. By 2013 most families in the local area preferred using religious private schools over public schools, and therefore the enrollment of the perennially under-utilized campus was 37% of its official capacity that year. The district closed the school in 2013. In September 2013 Grand Rapids Christian Schools offered to buy the building for $800,000. The district accepted the offer in 2014.
- Wellerwood Child Development Center - Now a part of North Park Montessori
- West Leonard Elementary School/West Leonard Child Development Center - It closed in 2013 as part of a wave of school closings. In 2014 W.L. Perry Associates offered to buy the school for $250,000. Cherry Street Capital, LLC, which wished to convert the facility into a residential building, offered the same amount of money in 2017.

Special education

- GRPS operated the Kent Education Center (KEC) Mayfield in a Kent Intermediate School District-owned building. GRPS closed this program in 2013 and Kent ISD opened its own program in its place.

== Other facilities ==
GRPS University, a district training center, is a former campus of City High Middle School, former Northeast Junior High.
