= West Catholic High School =

Location
- 1801 Bristol N.W. Grand Rapids, Michigan 49504; United States; 42°59′47″N 85°42′35″W

Information
- School type: Private Catholic college preparatory school
- Religious affiliation: Catholic
- Patron saint: St. John Paul II
- Established: 1962; 64 years ago
- President: Jill Annabelle
- Principal: Tony Fischer
- Teaching staff: 30.3 (FTE) (2019–20)
- Grades: 9–12
- Enrollment: 473 (2019–20)
- Student to teacher ratio: 15.6 (2019–20)
- Campus size: 44 acres (18 ha)
- Campus type: Midsize city
- Mascot: Freddy the Falcon
- Accreditation: North Central Association of Colleges and Schools; Michigan Non-Public School Accrediting Association
- Website: grwestcatholic.org
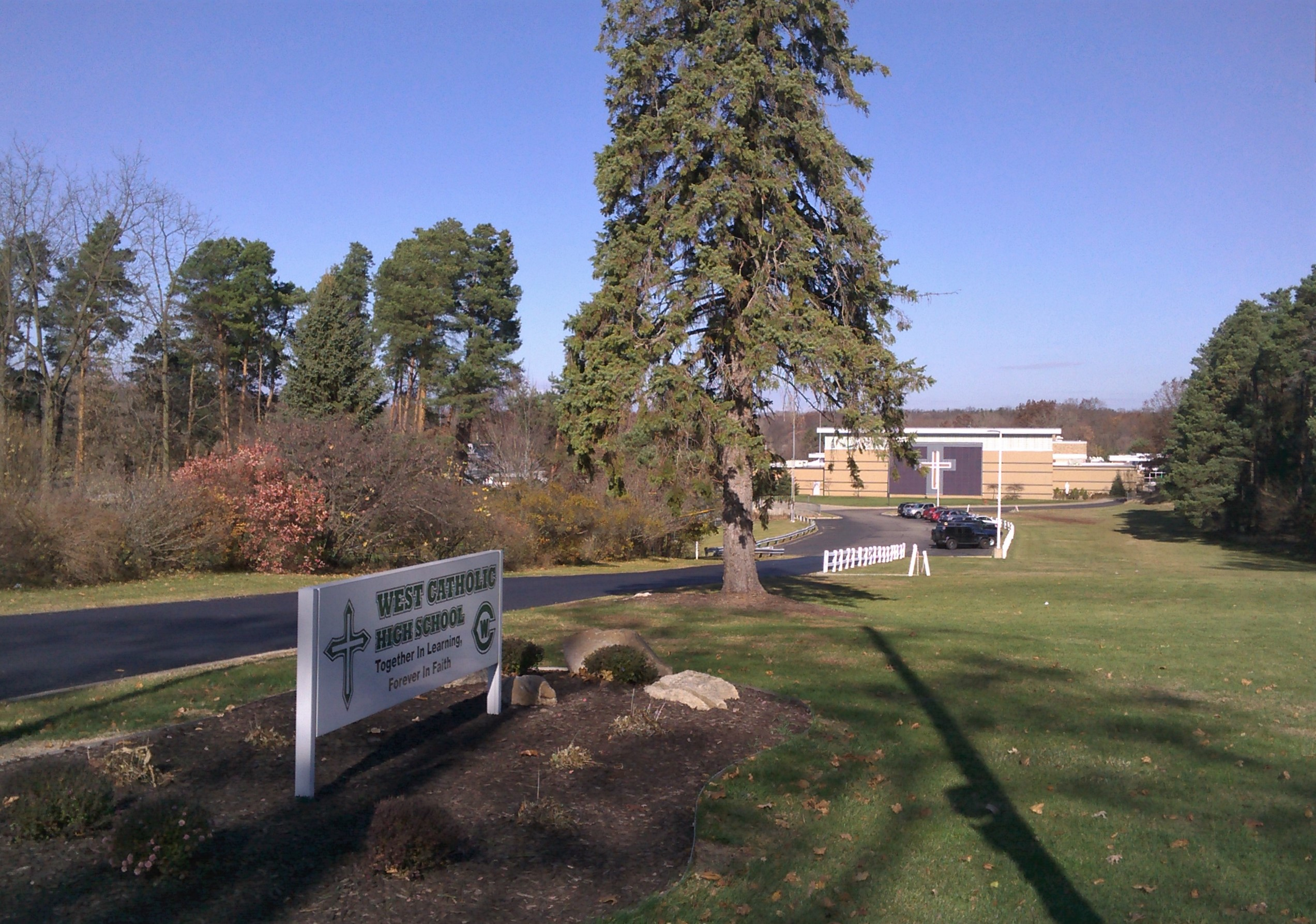

West Catholic High School is a private Catholic college preparatory secondary school in Grand Rapids, Michigan (U.S.). It opened in 1962 with loans from Kenowa Hills Public Schools. It is located within the Catholic Diocese of Grand Rapids.

== Academics ==
West Catholic has been honored each year since 2008 as one of the top Catholic high schools in the United States by the Cardinal Newman Society. With sixteen Advanced Placement courses taught on campus and Dual Enrollment credits through a partnership with Aquinas College also offered on-site, the Washington Post listed West Catholic as one of the most challenging private high schools in the United States for 2014, 2015, and 2016.

== Athletics ==
Grand Rapids West Catholic High School is a member of Ottawa-Kent Conference Blue Division. However, through the 2007-2008 school year, West Catholic was a member of Grand Rapids City League. West Catholic is also a school of the Michigan High School Athletic Association (MHSAA).

State Championships (MHSAA unless noted):

- 1970 Boys' Football - Class B
- 1970 Boys' Cross Country - Class B
- 1979 Girls' Basketball - Class B
- 1984 Girls' Gymnastics - Open Class
- 1990 Girls' Basketball - Class B
- 2003 Boys' Across Country - Division 3
- 2004 Boys' Team Track n' Field - Division 3
- 2008 Boys' Team Track n' Field - Division 3
- 2008 Girls' Team Track n' Field - Division 3
- 2009 Boys' Team Track n' Field - Division 3 (MITCA)
- 2010 Boys' Football - Division 5
- 2013 Boys' Football - Division 5
- 2014 Boys' Football - Division 5
- 2015 Boys' Football - Division 5
- 2016 Boys' Football - Division 5
- 2017 Boys' Football - Division 5
- 2022 Boys' Football - Division 6
- 2025 Boys' Football - Division 5

== Student life ==
The Westword is West Catholic's student newspaper. It is published on a monthly basis by members of the Journalism class each month. The Westword, a staple of student life at West Catholic, won Spartan Awards, the highest honor awarded by the Michigan Interscholastic Press Association (MIPA). The name, Westword, is a pun on westward, which refers to a direction.

== Notable alumni ==
- Greg Meyer, 1983 Boston Marathon champion
