= Wyoming High School (Michigan) =

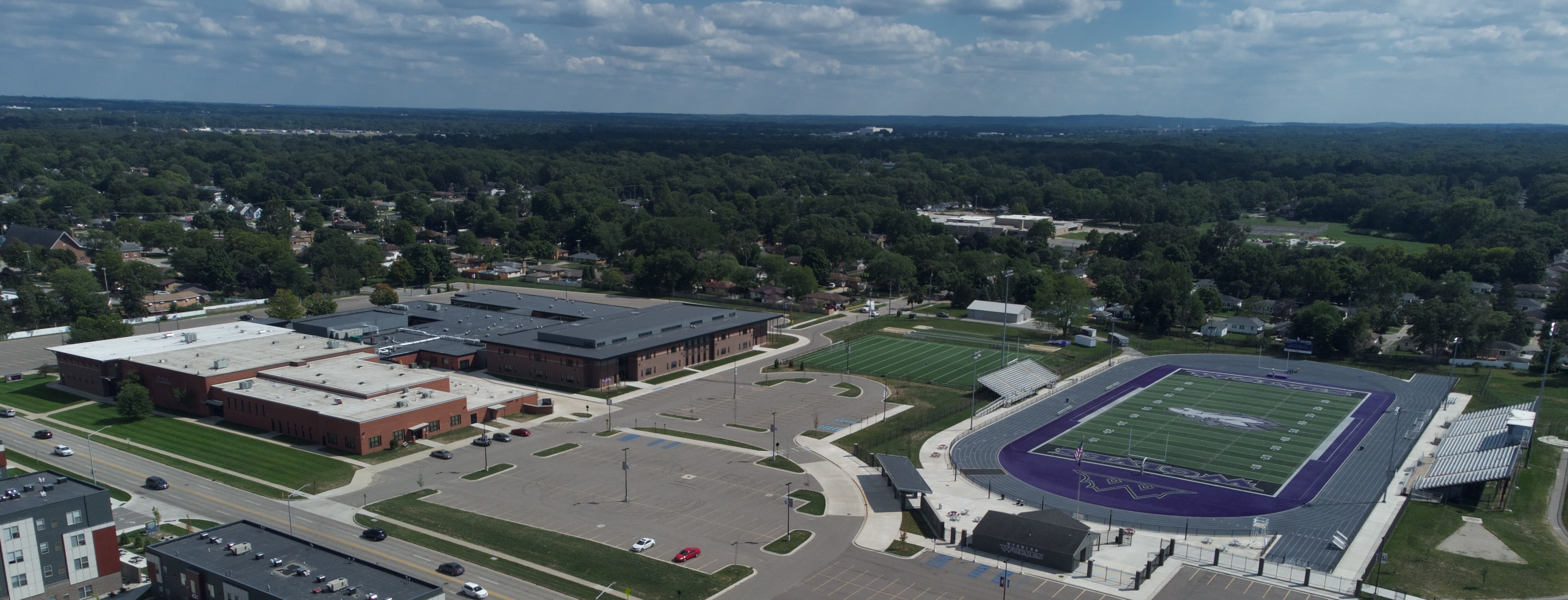

Location
- 1350 Prairie Parkway Southwest; Wyoming, Michigan 49509; United States
- 42°54′35″N 85°41′56″W

Information
- Type: Public, Coeducational high school
- Established: 2012
- School district: Wyoming Public Schools
- Superintendent: Craig Hoekstra
- Principal: Joshua Baumbach
- Teaching staff: 58.26 (FTE)
- Grades: 9-12
- Enrollment: 1,284 (2022-23)
- Student to teacher ratio: 22.04
- Campus: Suburban
- Colors: Purple, Silver, Black
- Athletics conference: Ottawa-Kent Conference, Green Division, Class A Division 1
- Nickname: Wolves
- Rival: Union High School
- Newspaper: Wyoming Wolf Pack Press
- Website: wyomingps.org/schools/secondary/high-school/

Wyoming High School is a public high school located in Wyoming, Michigan and is part of the Wyoming Public Schools District in Kent County, Michigan. Wyoming High School was formed from the combination of Wyoming Park High School and Rogers High School

== Football ==
The Wyoming Wolves high school football team was started in 2012. In nine seasons, from 2012 to 2020, they have had an overall losing record of 23–54. They had two winning seasons, in 2012 and 2016 both in which they went 5–4. They have had one playoff appearance, in 2020, and they played Mona Shores High School. The Wolves lost 6-54 and Mona Shores went on to win the state championship against De La Salle Collegiate High School. They are coached by Carlton Brewster.

== Basketball ==
Wyoming has a strong history of basketball success. They have won 3 conference championships, and in 2020 were the co-state champs during a season shortened by the COVID-19 pandemic. The year the school was founded (2012), the Wolves basketball team went 10-11, and were and academic all-state, with an average GPA of 3.2. Coach VanderKlay has coached the team since 1986 and has had 30 out of his 35 teams end up top 3 in the conference. Coach VanderKlay has won over 300 games through his coaching career
