= Mike Hart (American football) =

American football player and coach (born 1986)

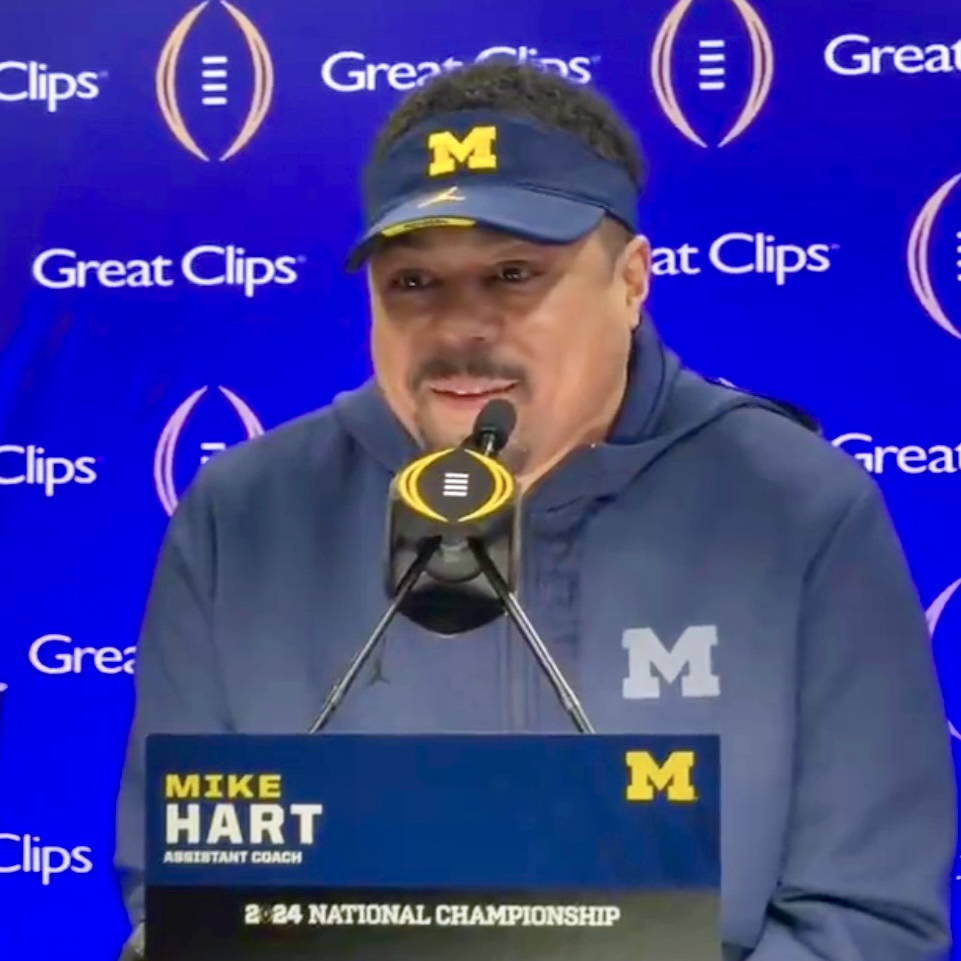
- Hart with Michigan in 2024

Boston College Eagles
- Title: Running backs coach

Personal information
- Born: April 9, 1986 (age 40); Syracuse, New York, U.S.
- Listed height: 5 ft 9 in (1.75 m)
- Listed weight: 206 lb (93 kg)

Career information
- High school: Onondaga Central (Nedrow, New York)
- College: Michigan
- NFL draft: 2008: 6th round, 202nd overall pick

Career history

Playing
- Indianapolis Colts (2008–2010)

Coaching
- Eastern Michigan (2011) Offensive quality control; Eastern Michigan (2012–2013) Running backs coach; Western Michigan (2014–2015) Running backs coach; Syracuse (2016) Running backs coach; Indiana (2017–2019) Running backs coach; Indiana (2020) Associate head coach & running backs coach; Michigan (2021) Running backs coach; Michigan (2022) Running backs coach & run game coordinator; Michigan (2023) Interim head coach, running backs coach & run game coordinator; Eastern Michigan (2025) Offensive analyst; Boston College (2026–present) Running backs coach

Awards and highlights
- CFP national champion (2023); 2× Second-team All-American (2006, 2007); 3× First-team All-Big Ten (2004, 2006, 2007); Big Ten Freshman of the Year (2004)

Career NFL statistics
- Rushing attempts: 71
- Rushing yards: 264
- Rushing touchdowns: 2
- Receptions: 12
- Receiving yards: 97
- Stats at Pro Football Reference

Leon Michael Hart (born April 9, 1986) is an American football coach and former player, currently the running backs coach at Boston College. Hart played college football as a running back at the University of Michigan from 2004 to 2007, and holds the Michigan Wolverines career rushing record with 5,040 yards. He was selected by the Indianapolis Colts in the 2008 NFL draft, and played for three seasons in the National Football League (NFL). Hart has previously worked as an assistant football coach at the University of Michigan, Eastern Michigan University, Western Michigan University, Syracuse University and Indiana University Bloomington.

== Early life ==
Hart attended Onondaga Central High School just outside Syracuse, New York where he set the national career record for rushing touchdowns (204), career points (for a non-quarterback) with 1,246, and finished second in career rushing yards (11,045). Onondaga Central went 46–1 (.979), losing only a single game to Mohawk Central School, and won three state championships (against Dobbs Ferry, Briarcliff and Cambridge) during Hart's career.

His national career touchdown record of 204 was surpassed by Johnathan Gray in 2011 although he remains first in career points.

Hart also excelled academically in high school, scoring 1280 on the SAT and graduating in the top five of his class with a 94% average.

== College career ==
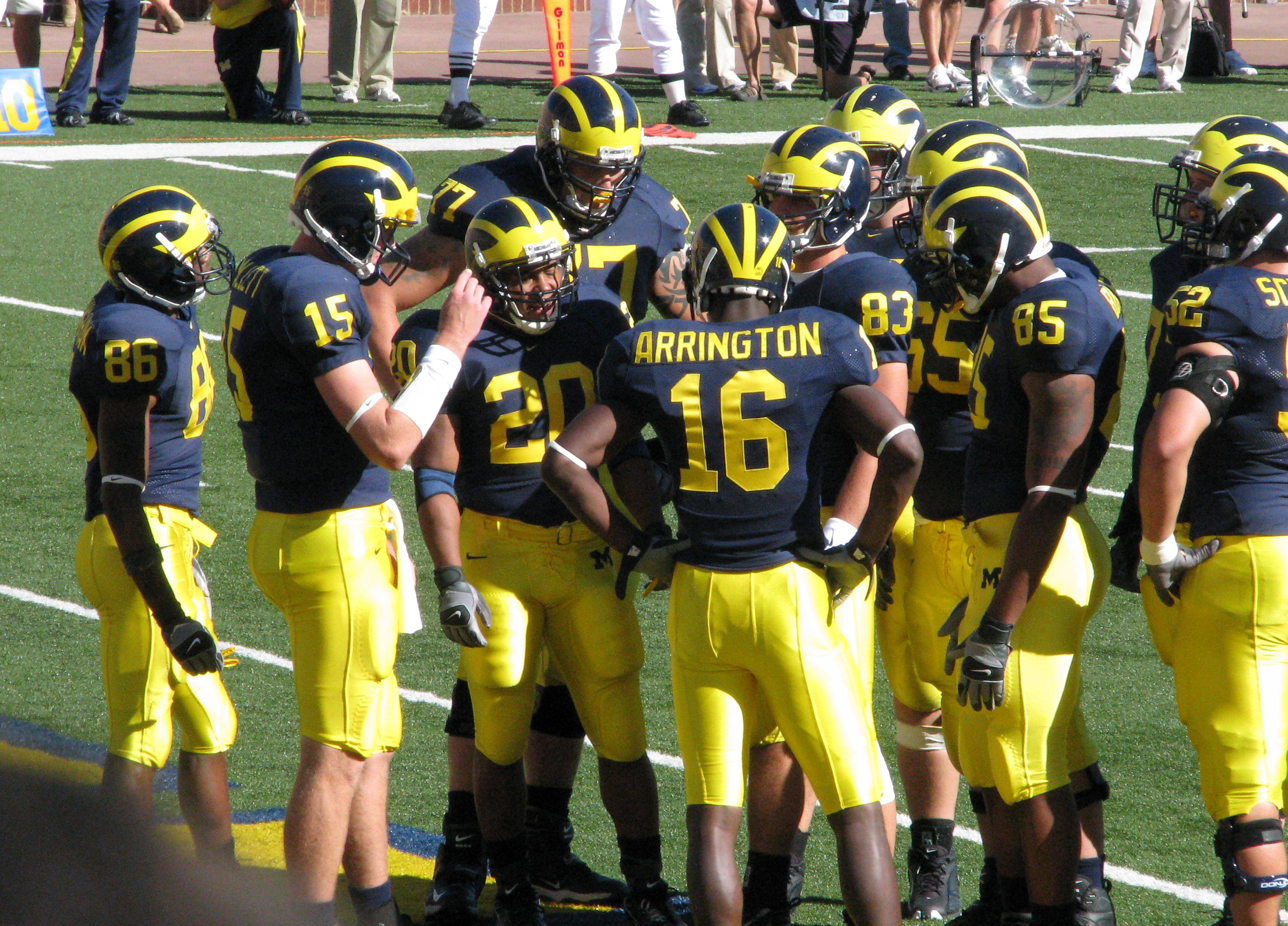
2007 team huddle with Mario Manningham (86), Ryan Mallett (15), Hart (20), Jake Long (77), Adrian Arrington (16), Mike Massey (83), Justin Boren (65), Carson Butler (85), and Stephen Schilling (52) against Penn State

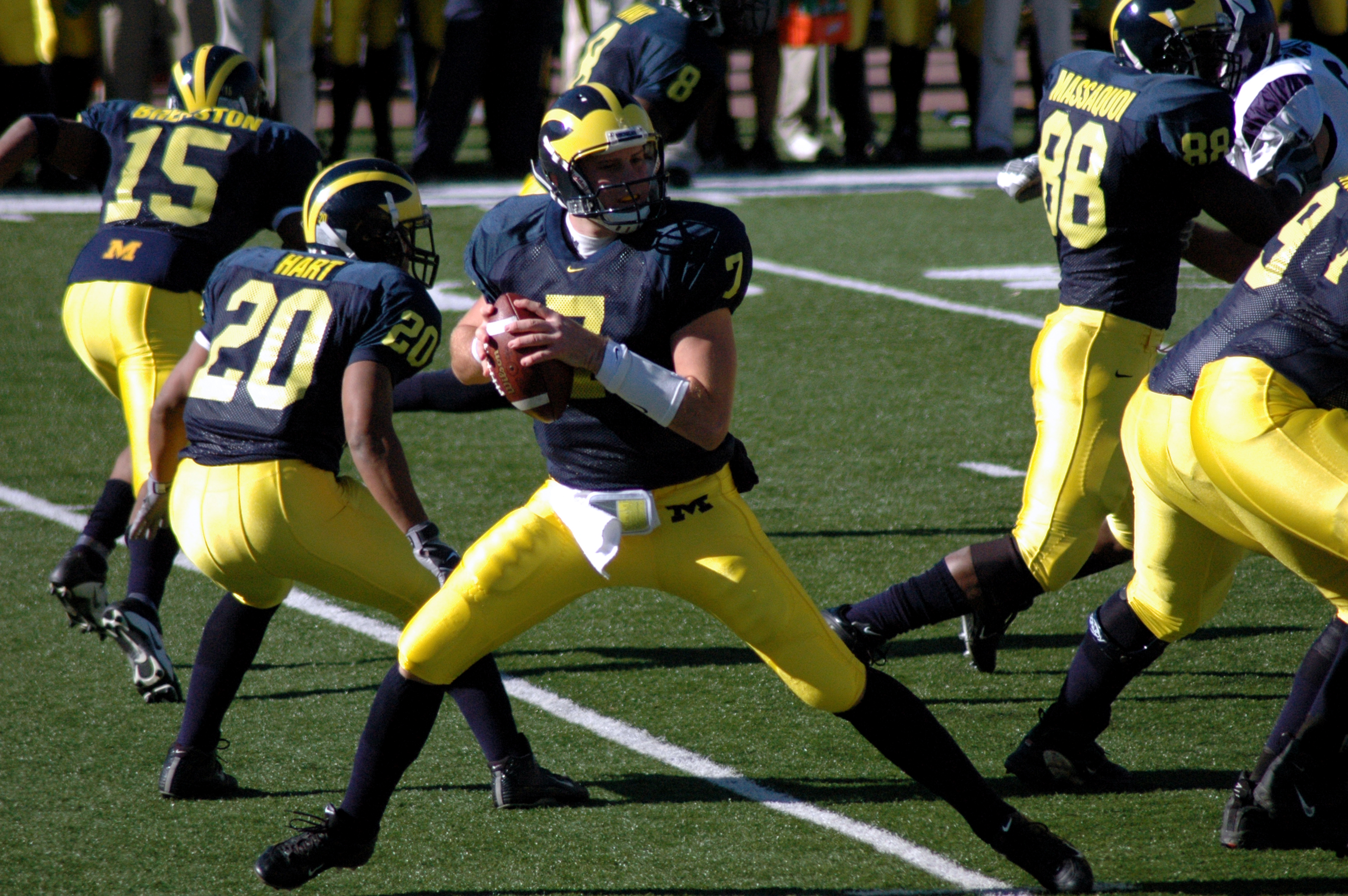
2004 Michigan Wolverines football team #20 Hart, #7 Chad Henne, #15 Steve Breaston, #8 Jason Avant, #88 Tim Massaquoi

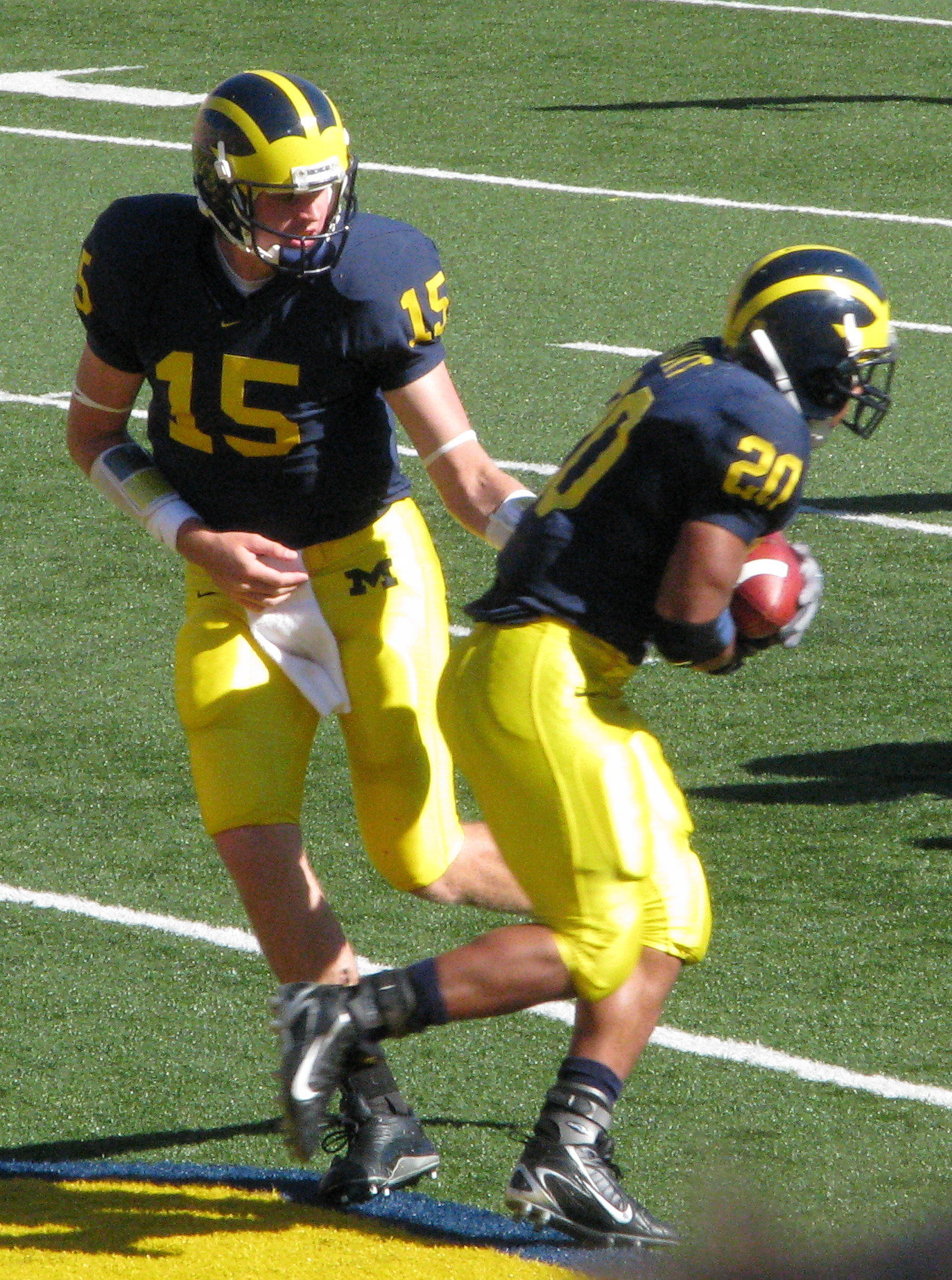
Ryan Mallett hands off to Hart

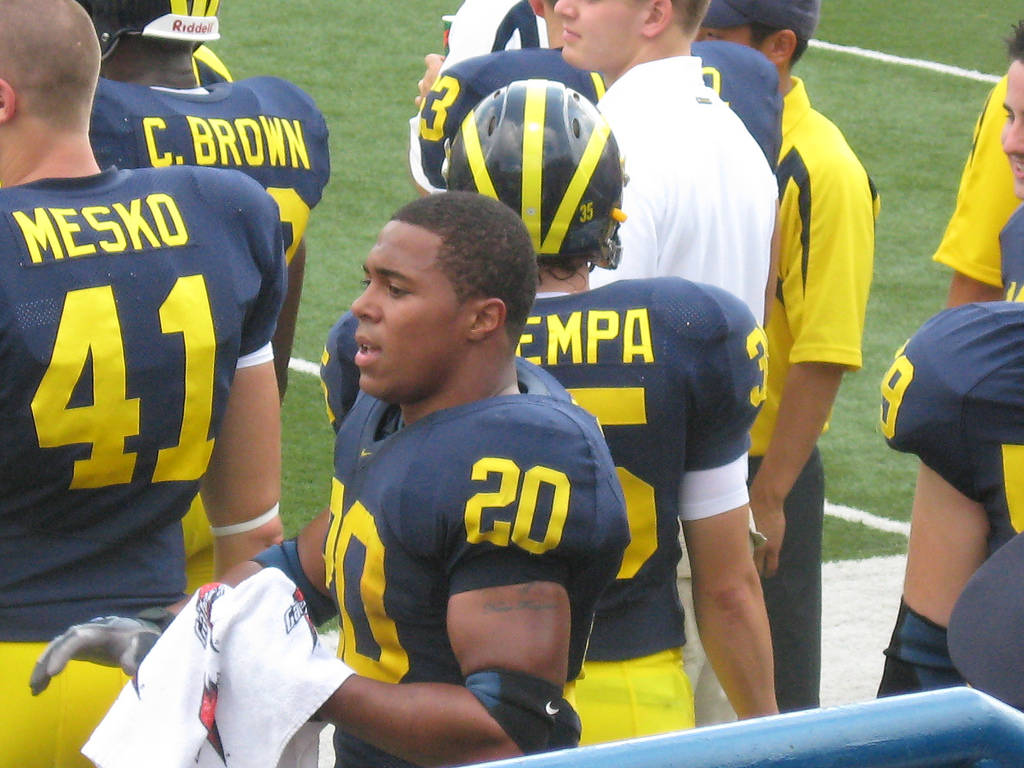
Hart on the Michigan sidelines behind Zoltan Mesko and Carlos Brown

In the 2004 season, Hart set a Michigan record for most rushing yards in a season by a freshman with 1,455. He rushed for nine touchdowns and had 26 receptions for 237 yards and a touchdown catch. For the 2005 season as a sophomore, Hart missed significant time due to a hamstring injury. He started eight of Michigan's 12 games and played sparingly in three of those. He finished the season with 662 yards and four touchdowns rushing and added 16 receptions for 154 yards and a touchdown catch.

During the 2006 season, Hart rushed for 1,562 yards – the fifth-best season total in Michigan history – and 14 touchdowns. He also caught 17 passes for 125 yards. For his efforts, Hart was recognized as his team's co-MVP with linebacker David Harris. He was also selected by both coaches and media to the All-Big Ten Conference First-team, named a finalist for the Doak Walker Award, and placed fifth in Heisman Trophy balloting.

As a senior in the 2007 season, Hart was elected team captain along with offensive tackle Jake Long and linebacker Shawn Crable. He entered the eighth week of the season as college football's leader in rushing yards, but after an ankle injury sidelined him for two games, he dropped in the rankings. Hart finished the season with 1,361 yards and 14 touchdowns. On November 7, 2007, after a 28–24 victory over rival Michigan State, Hart declared the infamous, "Yup. I was just laughing. I thought it was funny. They got excited. Sometimes you get your little brother excited when you're playing basketball, and you let him get the lead. Then you come back and take it back."

In his Michigan career, Hart rushed 1,015 times for 5,040 yards; both marks are school records. His 41 career rushing touchdowns are third-best in Michigan annals. Hart's 28 career games with at least 100 yards rushing and 5 games with at least 200 yards rushing are each the most in Michigan history. Hart lost three fumbles in his college career, two of which came in his last game as a Wolverine in the 2008 Capital One Bowl. In that game, Hart also passed the 5,000 yard rushing mark for his career, becoming only the fourth player in Big Ten history to do so.

=== Awards and honors ===
National awards

- 2006 Doak Walker Award finalist
- 2006 Maxwell Award semifinalist
- 2006 Walter Camp Award watchlist
- 2006 Heisman Trophy fifth place
- 2007 Maxwell Award semifinalist
- 2007 Doak Walker Award finalist

Conference honors

- 2004 All-Big Ten Conference First-team (coaches and media)
- 2004 Big Ten Freshman of the Year (coaches and media)
- 2006 All-Big Ten Conference First-team (coaches and media, unanimous)
- 2007 Big Ten Preseason Offensive Player of the Year (media)
- 2007 All-Big Ten Conference First-team (coaches and media)

Team awards

- 2006 Michigan football team co-MVP with David Harris
- 2007 Michigan football team MVP

=== Statistics ===
Season	Team	GP	Rushing					Receiving				
Season	Team	GP	Att	Yds	Avg	Lng	TD	Rec	Yds	Avg	Lng	TD
2004	Michigan	12	282	1,455	5.2	34	9	26	237	9.1	39	1
2005	Michigan	8	150	662	4.4	64	4	16	154	9.6	34	1
2006	Michigan	13	318	1,562	4.9	54	14	17	125	7.4	31	0
2007	Michigan	10	265	1,361	5.1	61	14	8	50	6.3	11	0
Career		43	1,015	5,040	5.0	64	41	67	566	8.4	39	2

== Professional career ==
Pre-draft measurables
Height	Weight	Arm length	Hand span	40-yard dash	10-yard split	20-yard split	20-yard shuttle	Three-cone drill	Vertical jump	Broad jump	Bench press
5 ft 8 7/8 in (1.75 m)	206 lb (93 kg)	29 1/2 in (0.75 m)	9 1/8 in (0.23 m)	4.69 s	1.58 s	2.69 s	4.33 s	6.91 s	32.0 in (0.81 m)	9 ft 2 in (2.79 m)	23 reps
All values from NFL Combine/Pro Day

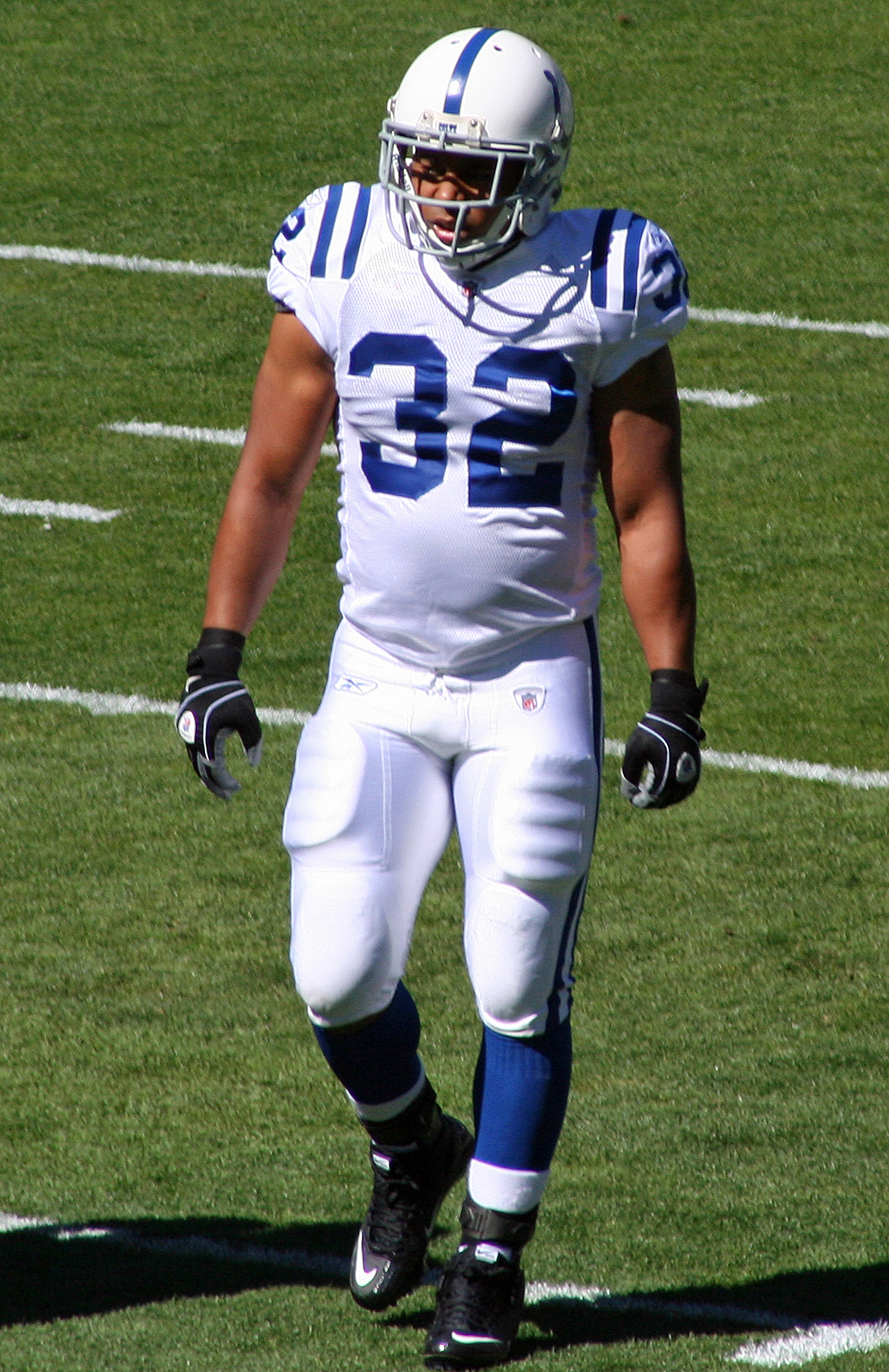
Hart with the Indianapolis Colts in 2010

Hart was selected in the sixth round (202nd overall) of the 2008 NFL draft by the Indianapolis Colts.

Third on the Colts depth chart behind Joseph Addai and Dominic Rhodes, Hart saw little action during the 2008 season, rushing for nine yards on two carries. During the second quarter of the Colts victory over the Baltimore Ravens in Week 6, Hart sustained a knee injury on an 18-yard reception from Peyton Manning. On October 15, Hart was placed on injured reserve, ending his season.

Hart missed the 2009 pre-season opener with an ankle injury. On September 5, Hart was cut by the Colts then was signed to the Colts practice squad on September 6. On October 4, Hart was reassigned to the Colts active roster, replacing Chad Simpson. On November 24, Hart was waived by the Colts. He was re-signed to the practice squad on November 25. Hart was promoted to the active roster on December 2. On December 6, Hart got his first touches of the 2009 season. He had 11 rushing yards and two receptions for 27 yards. He had 28 rushing yards on December 13. On January 3, 2010, in the first quarter against the Buffalo Bills, Hart scored the first touchdown of his NFL career on a one-yard run on a hand-off from Peyton Manning. On February 7, 2010, Hart had two carries in Super Bowl XLIV.

During a 2010 matchup against the Kansas City Chiefs, Hart scored his second career touchdown. It was the only touchdown of the game, as the Colts won 19–9. On November 1, 2010, in a Monday night game against the Houston Texans, Hart rushed for an NFL career-best 84 yards on 12 carries. Hart was released by the Colts on July 26, 2011.

== Coaching career ==
In August 2011, Hart accepted a job at Eastern Michigan University as the offensive quality control coach for the Eastern Michigan Eagles football team. He served in that capacity for the 2011 season and then for two seasons, 2012 and 2013, as the team's running backs coach. On February 4, 2014, Hart was announced as the running backs coach at Western Michigan University. On January 4, 2016, he was announced as the new running backs coach at Syracuse University. It was announced on March 2, 2017, that Hart was leaving Syracuse to assume the vacant running backs coach position at Indiana University Bloomington under his former coach Mike DeBord. On January 13, 2021, Hart was named the new running backs coach at the University of Michigan. On October 8, 2022, during the first quarter of Michigan's game against Indiana, Hart suffered a seizure on the sideline at Memorial Stadium in Bloomington, Indiana. He was carted off the field in a stretcher and taken to a hospital for evaluation. In the wake of Jim Harbaugh's three-game suspension to open the 2023 season, Hart served as interim head coach for the second half of Michigan's 2nd game of the season against UNLV. On September 9, 2023, Hart led the Wolverines to a 35–7 win over the Rebels. In doing so Hart earned his first official win as a college football head coach, while also becoming the first African American to head coach at Michigan.

Hart won a national championship with Michigan in 2023, coaching Blake Corum to back-to-back All-American selections at running back.

Following Harbaugh's departure from Michigan for the NFL, Hart's contract was not renewed by incoming head coach Sherrone Moore. Hart subsequently returned to Eastern Michigan as an offensive analyst for the 2025 season. On January 5, 2026, Hart was promoted to assistant head coach and wide receivers coach at Eastern Michigan. Ten days later, after accepting the promotion at Eastern Michigan, Hart departed to become the running backs coach at Boston College.

== Head coaching record ==
Year	Team	Overall	Conference	Standing	Bowl/playoffs	Coaches^{#}	AP^{°}
Michigan Wolverines (Big Ten Conference) (2023)
2023	Michigan	1–0 (Note: Michigan's head coach, Jim Harbaugh, was suspended for the first three games of the 2023 season. Jesse Minter served as interim head coach for the first game of the season, Jay Harbaugh and Hart were interim co-head coaches for the second game, and Sherrone Moore served as interim head coach for the third game.)	0–0	(East)			
Michigan:		1–0	0–0				
Total:		1–0					

== See also ==
- Michigan Wolverines football statistical leaders
