= Harry Berrios =

American baseball player

Harry Berrios (born December 2, 1971) is an American former professional baseball player who is now an assistant coach for Davenport University. He usually played left field, or Designated Hitter, but in the 2006 season, Berrios played at 1st base for a few games due to the retirement of Jon Benick. He played for the Winnipeg Goldeyes from 2002 to 2006. The team released him after a slow start to the 2006 season and he signed with their rivals the Fargo-Moorhead RedHawks. Harry had 54 home runs and 291 RBIs from 2002 to 2005 with the Goldeyes. His batting average in those 4 years with Winnipeg was .327.

== High school ==
Harry prepped at Ottawa Hills High School in Grand Rapids, MI where he excelled in football and baseball. In the fall of 1989 he tied a Michigan state record with a 99-yard touchdown run in a game against Jenison High School. He led the Ottawa Hills High School baseball team to the Grand Rapids City League Championship in the spring of 1990.

== College career ==
Harry was drafted out of high school to play baseball but elected to attend LSU where he won 2 NCAA Championships in baseball. In 1992, he played collegiate summer baseball with the Chatham A's of the Cape Cod Baseball League and was named a league all-star. In 1993 he was named the Most Valuable Player of the SEC tournament.

== Professional career ==
Drafted: - Selected by Texas Rangers in 16th Round (427th overall) of 1990 amateur entry draft (June-Reg) ... Selected by Baltimore Orioles in 8th Round (231st overall) of 1993 amateur entry draft (June-Reg) Jun 24, 1993 - signed Jul 21, 1996 - Released by Orioles Aug 5, 1996 - Signed by Indians Oct 15, 1996 - Granted free agency Feb 22, 1997 - re-signed by Indians Mar 29, 1997 - Released by Indians May 1, 1997 - Signed by independent Sioux Falls (Northern) Jul 1, 1998 - Signed by independent Thunder Bay (Northern) May 1, 1999 - Signed by independent Schaumburg (Northern) Aug 8, 2000 - Contract purchased by Rangers from Schaumburg Mar 18, 2002 - Released by Rangers May 1, 2002 - Signed by independent Winnipeg (Northern)

== Awards ==
Baseball Awards
Year	Award name
1994	Baseball America First Team Minor League All-Star OF Baltimore Orioles Minor League Player of the Year
2002	Northern League Western Division All-Star OF
2003	Northern League All-Star OF Independent Leagues All-Star OF
2005	Northern League All-Star DH
