= George Kok =

American basketball player (1922–2013)

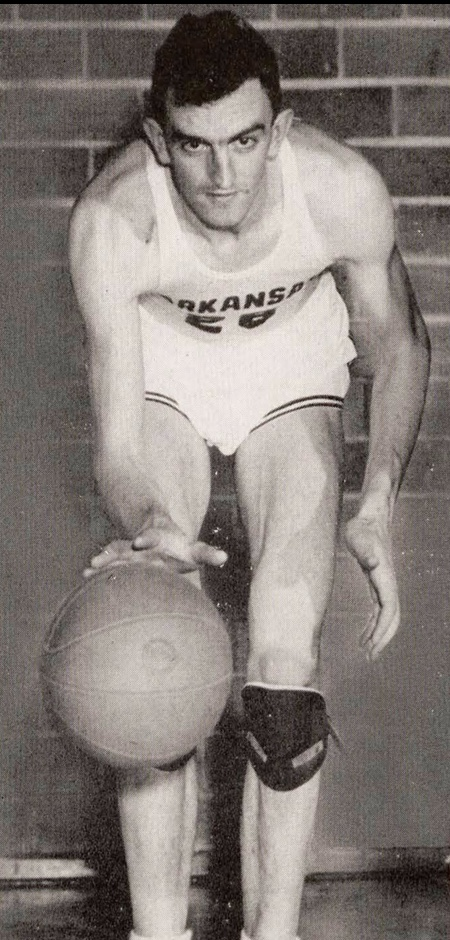
- Kok as a senior at Arkansas

Personal information
- Born: March 18, 1922 Grand Rapids, Michigan, U.S.
- Died: October 13, 2013 (aged 91) Louisville, Kentucky, U.S.
- Listed height: 6 ft 11 in (2.11 m)

Career information
- High school: Ottawa Hills (Grand Rapids, Michigan)
- College: Arkansas (1944–1948)
- BAA draft: 1948: 1st round, 2nd overall pick
- Drafted by: Indianapolis Jets
- Playing career: 1949–1950
- Position: Center

Career history
- 1949–1950: Bridgeport Aer-A-Sols

Career highlights
- Second-team All-American – SN (1946); Third-team All-American – AP (1948); 3× First-team All-SWC (1945, 1946, 1948)
- Stats at Basketball Reference

George William Kok Sr. (March 18, 1922 – October 5, 2013) was an American basketball player. At the University of Arkansas in the 1940s, he was one of the first true big men to dominate the game. He was the second overall pick in the 1948 BAA draft, but never played in the league that was the predecessor of today's National Basketball Association.

== College career ==
Kok played high school athletics in Grand Rapids, Michigan before coming to Arkansas. Because of the shortage of athletes at the end of World War II, Kok was able to play a full four seasons 1944–45 to 1947–48 (versus the usual 3 years of eligibility in most instances up until the 1970s). Standing 6 feet, 10 inches tall, Kok dominated the game from his freshman days, averaging 18.7 points in his first season. During that 1944–45 season, he led the team to the final four teams of the NCAA Tournament, losing to Oklahoma A&M (now Oklahoma State) and its dominant big man, Bob Kurland, 69–41 in the regional final.

Kok went on to become the first Arkansas player to score over 1,000 points in his career, finishing with 1,644 in 94 games, an average of 17.5 per contest. He still ranks number 11 on the all-time Arkansas scoring list at the start of the 2008–2009 season and his career total was not surpassed for 30 years. He was named The Sporting News 2nd team All-America in 1945, Associated Press 3rd team All-America in 1948 and All-Southwest Conference in 1945, 1946 and 1948. He twice led the Southwest Conference in scoring.

=== College statistics ===
Year	Team	GP	FT%	PPG
1947–48	Arkansas	24	.675	19.5
Career		24	.675	19.5

== Professional career ==
=== Bridgeport Aer-A-Sols (1949–1950) ===
Kok was selected as the number two pick overall by the Indianapolis Jets in the 1948 BAA draft, but never signed with the team nor played in the league. He did play one season with the Bridgeport Aer-A-Sols in the American Basketball League in 1949–50, leading the team in scoring at 15.0 points per game and helping the team to the league finals, where they lost to Scranton.

== Post-playing career ==
Following his playing days, Kok became the first athletic director at Pleasure Ridge Park High School in Louisville, Kentucky and spent 24 years teaching at the school.

Kok has been honored by the Arkansas Sports Hall of Fame (1988), the University of Arkansas Sports Hall of Honor (1994) and the Grand Rapids Sports Hall of Fame (2005).

Kok died October 5, 2013, at the age of 91.
