= City High-Middle School =

Public school in Michigan, U.S.

City High Middle School

Location
- 1720 Plainfield Ave. NE; Grand Rapids, Michigan 49505-5305; 42.99352°N 85.65916°W

Information
- School type: Public, magnet high school and middle school
- Founded: Early 1970s
- School district: Grand Rapids Public Schools
- Principal: Charlotte VanderVliet
- Staff: 39.58 (FTE)
- Grades: 7–12
- Age range: 12–18
- Enrollment: 908 (2022–2023)
- Student to teacher ratio: 22.94
- Campus: Urban
- Colors: Blue and white
- Mascot: Pegasus
- Feeder schools: Greater Grand Rapids area schools
- Website: grps.org/city www.chmsib.com

Student assessments
- 2021–22 school year Change vs. prior year

M-STEP 11th grade proficiency rates (Science / Social Studies)
- Advanced %: 31.8 / 25.6
- Proficient %: 31.0 / 50.4
- PR. Proficient %: 14.7 / –
- Not Proficient %: 22.5 / ≤5

Average test scores
- SAT Total: 1158.0 (▼ −6.4)

City High Middle School is a public, magnet high school operated by the Grand Rapids Public Schools in the greater Grand Rapids, Michigan area.

== History ==
City High School was established in the early 1970s as an alternative school for Grand Rapids Public Schools students in grades 9–12 who were "highly motivated and academically gifted" but were not being served adequately by the district's larger high schools. Enrollment in its early years was about 100 students. The school expanded in 1979 to include grades 7 and 8 as City Middle School, roughly doubling its enrollment.

The school was originally located on the campus of what was then Grand Rapids Junior College on Bostwick Avenue. It has since moved thrice: first in the 1990s, when GRJC separated from the GRPS, to a building adjacent to Grand Rapids Central High School and Fountain Elementary; in 2006, to the site of the former Northeast Middle School at 1400 Fuller Avenue NE; and in 2013, to the former Creston High School building at 1720 Plainfield Avenue Northeast. The district repurposed the pre-2013 campus into GRPS University, a district training center.

In 2009, after several years at the bronze level, U.S. News & World Report awarded City a silver medal rating in its annual ranking of America's best high schools. City received the silver medal rating again in 2012. In 2013 the magazine honored City with a gold medal rating and ranked it #255 among the nation's high schools. Since then, City has continued its ascent in the state and national rankings, with U.S. News & World Report ranking it #1 in Michigan and #18 in the United States in 2022.

In 2010, City became an International Baccalaureate school, students started being able to receive the IB diploma in 2011.

== See also ==
- International Academy
