= David Harris (American football) =

American football player (born 1984)

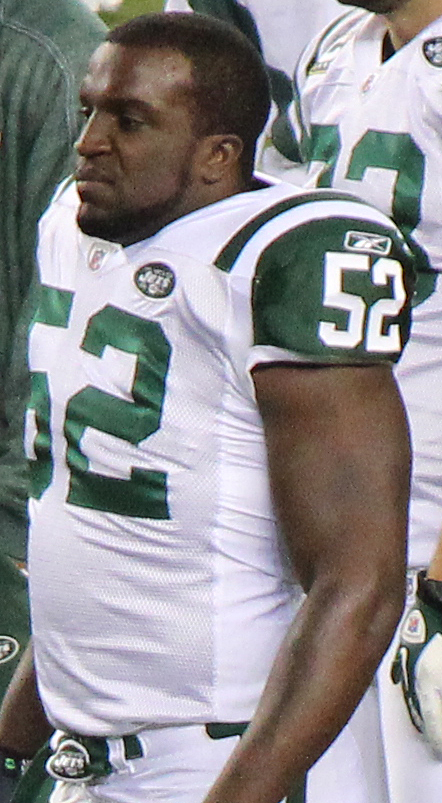
- Harris with the New York Jets in 2011

No. 52, 45
- Position: Linebacker

Personal information
- Born: January 21, 1984 (age 42); Grand Rapids, Michigan, U.S.
- Listed height: 6 ft 2 in (1.88 m)
- Listed weight: 250 lb (113 kg)

Career information
- High school: Ottawa Hills (Grand Rapids)
- College: Michigan
- NFL draft: 2007: 2nd round, 47th overall pick

Career history
- New York Jets (2007–2016); New England Patriots (2017)

Awards and highlights
- Second-team All-Pro (2009); PFWA NFL All-Rookie Team (2007); Second-team All-American (2006); First-team All-Big Ten (2006); NFL record: Most solo tackles in a game (20)

Career NFL statistics
- Total tackles: 1,110
- Sacks: 37
- Forced fumbles: 11
- Fumble recoveries: 4
- Interceptions: 6
- Defensive touchdowns: 1
- Stats at Pro Football Reference

David Charles Harris (born January 21, 1984) is an American former professional football player who was a linebacker of the National Football League (NFL). He played college football for the Michigan Wolverines. Harris was selected by the New York Jets in the second round of the 2007 NFL draft.

== Early life ==
Harris attended Ottawa Hills High School in Grand Rapids, Michigan where he played high school football. At linebacker, he set a school record with 158 tackles as a junior, and earned all-state honors from the Detroit Free Press as a senior, and he also contributed as a fullback.

Harris also participated in track and field, and this combination of size and speed led him to become one of the state's top prospects.

== College career ==
Harris received an athletic scholarship to attend the University of Michigan, where he played for the Michigan Wolverines football team. However, he was forced to redshirt as a freshman due to a knee injury which nearly derailed his career. It took nearly two years for Harris to fully recover, and he only played sparingly as a redshirt freshman and sophomore.

Not until his junior year did Harris become a full-time starter. He began to show signs of a future in the NFL when he led the Wolverines in 2005 with 88 tackles, and 103 tackles as a senior. In 2006, he earned All-Big Ten Conference honors, was Wolverines co-MVP with Mike Hart, and was a second-team All-America selection by the Associated Press, Sports Illustrated, and Rivals.com.

=== National awards ===
- 2006 Dick Butkus Award semifinalist

=== Conference honors ===
- 2006 All-Big Ten Conference First-team (coaches) and Second-team (media)

=== Team awards ===
- 2006 Michigan football team co-MVP with Mike Hart
- 2005 & 2006 Roger Zatkoff Award

== Professional career ==
=== Pre-draft ===
Harris was projected to go anywhere from the late-second round to the fourth round prior to the 2007 NFL draft.

Pre-draft measurables
Height	Weight	Arm length	Hand span	40-yard dash	10-yard split	20-yard split	20-yard shuttle	Three-cone drill	Vertical jump	Broad jump	Bench press
6 ft 2 in (1.88 m)	243 lb (110 kg)	30 3/4	9 1/8	4.59 s	1.53 s	2.59 s	4.29 s	7.25 s	33 in (0.84 m)	8 ft 11 in (2.72 m)	23 reps
All values from the NFL Combine.

=== New York Jets ===
==== 2007 ====
The New York Jets selected Harris in the second round (47th overall) of the 2007 NFL draft. The Jets traded their second (63rd overall), third (89th overall), and sixth round picks (191st overall) to the Green Bay Packers and received the Packers' second round pick (47th overall), which they used to select Harris.

On July 26, 2007, the Jets signed Harris to a four-year, $3.46 million contract. Throughout training camp, Harris competed against veterans Eric Barton and Victor Hobson for a job as a starting linebacker. Head coach Eric Mangini named Harris a backup inside linebacker to begin the regular season, behind Eric Barton and Victor Hobson.

On October 28, 2007, Harris recorded his first NFL start, making 17 tackles (10 solo) and 1 sack in Week 8 against the Buffalo Bills. Harris started in place of the injured Jonathan Vilma who was placed on injured reserve after a knee injury. Harris made 24 tackles (20 solo) the following week against the Washington Redskins. In 2007, Harris was named NFL's Defensive Rookie of the Month for November 2007.

For the 2007 NFL season, Harris had 127 tackles, 5 sacks, and two forced fumbles despite only starting 9 games, and earned various all-rookie honors.

==== 2008 ====
Harris was named the starter at inside linebacker for the 2008 season. Although an injury shortened season limited Harris to just 11 games, he still posted 87 tackles and 1 sack.

==== 2009 ====
Against the Houston Texans in the first week of the season, Harris finished with 11 tackles (six solo), one sack, and a deflected pass in a 24–7 win. Harris also won AFC Defensive Player of the Week for his play. In week three, as his team was only up seven points, he intercepted a Kerry Collins pass, and then followed that drive by sacking him on first down during the Tennessee Titans next series. Harris himself had 12 tackles, (ten solo). During the Jets' week six game against the Buffalo Bills, Harris recorded 17 tackles. In week 11 against division rivals, Harris recorded 13 tackles (ten solo) as he earned defensive play caller for the Jets that week.

Harris finished his season as the leading tackler on football's number one defense with 127 tackles. He also chipped in with five and a half sacks and two interceptions. In addition, he made second-team all-pro.

The Jets finished the season with a 9–7 record, barely clinching a wild card spot. The team made it to the AFC Championship for the first time since 1998 until losing to the Indianapolis Colts.

==== 2010 ====
On January 16, 2011, Harris recorded his first career postseason interception in which he returned it for 58 yards against the New England Patriots in the AFC Divisional Round. The Jets won 28–21 to advance to their second straight AFC Championship game. It was Tom Brady's first Interception in 11 games (340 pass attempts without an interception). The Jets finished the season 11–5, clinching another wild card spot, and made it to the AFC Championship for the 2nd year in a row, but lost 19–24 against the Pittsburgh Steelers.

==== 2011–2016 ====
Harris recorded 86 tackles, 5 sacks along with 4 interceptions in the 2011 season. On November 9, 2011, he was named AFC's Defensive Player of the Week for his performance against the Buffalo Bills.

In 2012, he recorded 123 combined tackles, 3 sacks, 3 passes defended and one forced fumble.

Harris finished the 2013 season with 124 combined tackles, 2 sacks, one passes defended and one forced fumble.

He finished the 2014 season with 123 combined tackles along with five and half sacks and two forced fumbles.

On March 6, 2015, the Jets re-signed Harris to a three-year, $21.5 million contract with $15 million guaranteed. In 16 starts in 2015, he made 108 tackles with 4.5 sacks, 4 passes defended, and 2 forced fumbles. He finished the 2016 season with 95 combined tackles, half a sack and two passes defensed.

On June 6, 2017, in a surprising move, Harris was released by the Jets after 10 seasons.

=== New England Patriots ===
On June 21, 2017, Harris signed a two-year contract with the New England Patriots worth $5 million. Harris played in Super Bowl LII, but the Patriots lost 41–33 to the Philadelphia Eagles.

=== Retirement ===
On February 23, 2018, Harris announced his retirement from the NFL after 11 seasons.

=== Career awards and highlights ===
- Second-team All-Pro selection (2009)
- 2× AFC Defensive Player of the Week (Week 1 (2009), Week 9 (2011))
- NFL Defensive Rookie of the Month (November 2007)
- Ed Block Courage Award (2009)
- PFWA NFL All-Rookie Team (2007)

== NFL career statistics ==
Year	Team	GP	Tackles				Fumbles			Interceptions						Stuff	
Year	Team	GP	Comb	Solo	Ast	Sack	FF	FR	Yds	Int	Yds	Avg	Lng	TD	PD	Stuff	Yds
2007	NYJ	16	127	90	37	5.0	2	1	0	0	0	0.0	0	0	3	4	8
2008	NYJ	11	75	52	23	1.0	0	1	0	0	0	0.0	0	0	1	1	1
2009	NYJ	16	127	82	45	5.5	2	0	0	2	24	12.0	14	0	3	0	0
2010	NYJ	16	99	69	30	3.0	1	1	0	0	0	0.0	0	0	3	3	16
2011	NYJ	16	86	65	21	5.0	0	0	0	4	55	13.8	35	1	8	4	12
2012	NYJ	16	123	79	44	3.0	1	1	0	0	0	0.0	0	0	3	2	7
2013	NYJ	16	124	70	54	2.0	1	0	0	0	0	0.0	0	0	1	8	18
2014	NYJ	16	123	71	52	5.5	2	0	0	0	0	0.0	0	0	1	5	10
2015	NYJ	16	108	67	41	4.5	2	0	0	0	0	0.0	0	0	4	0	0
2016	NYJ	15	95	63	32	0.5	0	0	0	0	0	0.0	0	0	2	5	12
2017	NE	10	22	15	7	1.5	0	0	0	0	0	0.0	0	0	1	0	0
Career		164	1,109	723	386	36.5	11	4	0	6	79	13.2	35	1	32	39	101

== Personal life ==
He currently resides in Ann Arbor, Michigan. He was nicknamed The Hitman by New York Jets website host Eric Allen.
