= Wyoming Public Schools =

School district in Michigan

Address
- 3575 Gladiola SW Wyoming, Kent, Michigan, 49519; United States

District information
- Grades: Pre-Kindergarten-12
- Superintendent: Craig Hoekstra
- Schools: 7
- Budget: $87,364,000 2022-2023 expenditures
- NCES District ID: 2636570

Students and staff
- Students: 3,832 (2024-2025)
- Teachers: 226.96 (on an FTE basis) (2024-2025)
- Staff: 448.83 FTE (2024-2025)
- Student–teacher ratio: 16.88 (2024-2025)

Other information
- Website: wyomingps.org

Wyoming Public Schools is a public school district in the Grand Rapids, Michigan area. It serves parts of the city of Wyoming.

== History ==
The school district of Wyoming Park was established prior to 1911, the year that grades nine and ten were added to the district. In 1938, the school was accredited by the University of Michigan and the first senior class graduated.

Wyoming Park High School was built in 1936. Rogers High School, now known as Wyoming High School, opened in January 1956. In 1962, the school districts of Newhall, Rogers, and Wyoming Park merged to form Wyoming Public Schools.

Beginning in the 2012–13 school year, the district was restructured. This combined both high schools into a single high school on the campus of Rogers High School, which served students in grades 10 to 12. Wyoming Park High School became Wyoming Junior High, serving students in grades 7 to 9. Newhall Middle School (grades 6 and 7) became Wyoming Intermediate School (grades 5 and 6).

In 2017, voters passed a $79.5 million bond issue to improve district facilities. The high school was renovated and partially rebuilt with these funds. In fall of 2024, Wyoming Junior High School reopened with a renovated and reconstructed building.

== Schools ==
Schools in Wyoming Public Schools district
School	Address	Notes
Wyoming High School	1350 Prairie Parkway SW	Grades 9-12
Wyoming Junior High School	2125 Wrenwood	Grades 7-8
Wyoming Intermediate School	1331 33rd St. SW	Grades 5-6
Gladiola Elementary	3500 Gladiola Ave. SW	Grades K-4
Oriole Park Elementary	1420 40th St. SW	Grades PreK-4
Parkview Elementary	2075 Lee St. SW	Grades K-4
West Elementary	1840 38th St. SW	Grades K-4
Wyoming Secondary Learning Academy	2125 Wrenwood	Shares a building with Wyoming Junior High School
Wyoming Early Childhood Center		Preschool, formerly Huntington Woods Elementary
