= Carlton Brewster =

American football player (born 1983)

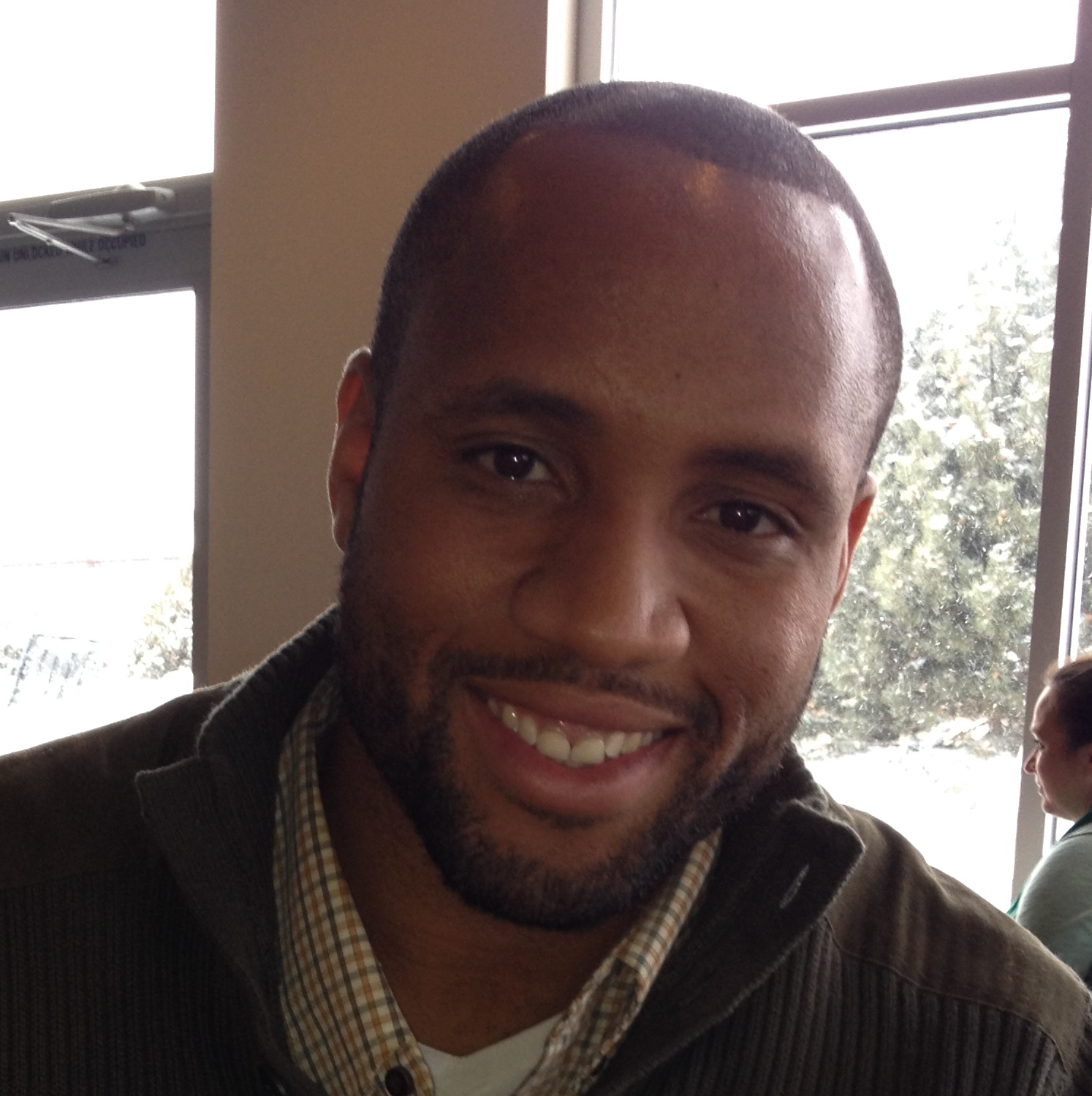
- Brewster in 2014

No. 5, 12
- Position: Wide receiver

Personal information
- Born: February 12, 1983 (age 43); Grand Rapids, Michigan, U.S.
- Listed height: 6 ft 0 in (1.83 m)
- Listed weight: 215 lb (98 kg)

Career information
- High school: Grand Rapids (MI) Creston
- College: Ferris State
- NFL draft: 2006: undrafted

Career history
- Cleveland Browns (2006)*; Green Bay Packers (2006–2007)*; San Diego Chargers (2007)*; Denver Broncos (2007–2008)*; New Orleans Saints (2008)*; Grand Rapids Rampage (2008); Oklahoma City Yard Dawgz (2009); Chicago Rush (2011)
- * Offseason or practice squad member only

Awards and highlights
- All-NFL Europa (2007); Second-team Little All-American (2005); 2-time All-GLIAC (2004-2005)

Carlton Brewster (born February 12, 1983) is a former National Football League (NFL) wide receiver. He was signed by the Cleveland Browns as an undrafted free agent in 2006. He played college football at Ferris State University.

== Early life ==
Carlton attended Creston High School in Grand Rapids, Michigan. 2011 Brewster finished his undergraduate degree at Ferris State University. He went on to finish his Master of Education at Grand Valley State University in education leadership.

== College career ==
Brewster was Ferris State’s second all-time leading receiver with 3,184 career receiving yards and 25 touchdowns on 234 receptions in 43 contests. Brewster was named 2005 second-team Associated Press (AP) Little All-American.

Brewster earned first-team All-GLIAC honors last season and All-America Honorable Mention laurels by Don Hansen’s Weekly Football Gazette and D2Football.com.

Brewster received the preseason recognition after turning in his best season in a Ferris uniform 2004 with a career-best 81 receptions for 1,230 yards and eight touchdowns as an 11-game starter. His season receiving yards total marked the third-highest total ever on Ferris’ all-time single-season receiving leaders chart.

Brewster, an All-GLIAC second-teamer both at receiver and as a return specialist in 2003, presently ranks fifth among the school’s all-time receiving leaders with 2,263 career yards on 174 receptions and 18 touchdowns in 32 games. His 3,844 career all-purpose yards is sixth best on Ferris’ all-time charts while his 567 punt return yards (7.8 ypr) on 73 career returns is fourth highest in school annals. The 2002 FSU Special Teams Player of the Year has amassed 999 career yards on 57 kickoff returns (17.5 ypr), which is fifth best among the Bulldogs’ career leaders.

Three NAIA Players Honored on AFCA DII All-American Team and Brewster was one of them in 2003 as he recorded five 100-yard plus receiving performances this season, including a season-best 137 yards and two touchdowns on eight receptions against Northern Michigan.

== Professional career ==
Brewster has also been an NFL member of the Green Bay Packers, San Diego Chargers, Denver Broncos and New Orleans Saints.

Signed by the Chicago Rush of the Arena Football League in January 2011 to compete for a job as a wide receiver and kickoff returner.

== Post-career ==
Brewster is the owner of Wide Receiver Secrets where he coaches wide receivers. He also coaches for the Wyoming High School (Michigan) Wolves in Wyoming, Michigan.
