= Chuck DeShane =

American football player (1918–2006)

No. 60
- Position: Linebacker/Quarterback/Guard

Personal information
- Born: December 10, 1918; Waukesha, Wisconsin, U.S.
- Died: November 5, 2006 (aged 87)
- Listed height: 6 ft 1 in (1.85 m)
- Listed weight: 212 lb (96 kg)

Career information
- High school: Creston (Grand Rapids, Michigan)
- College: Alabama
- NFL draft: 1941: undrafted

Career history
- Detroit Lions (1945–1949)

Career NFL statistics
- Games played - started: 48 - 22
- Interceptions: 5
- Touchdowns: 2

Charles Frederick DeShane (December 10, 1918 – November 5, 2006) was an American professional football player in the National Football League for the Detroit Lions from 1945 to 1949.

== Career ==
Born in Waukesha, Wisconsin, DeShane was the starting quarterback for the University of Alabama in 1939 and 1940 and was named to the All-Southeastern Conference team his senior season. He coached football from 1942 to 1944 at his alma mater, Creston High School (Grand Rapids, Michigan), before signing with the Lions.

From 1945 to 1946, Deshane played quarterback and linebacker for the Lions. He played guard from 1947 to 1949.

== Personal life ==
DeShane was also a railroad conductor during the offseasons. He was married to his second wife Evelyn for 31 years and had four children with his wife Lorraine, 14 grandchildren and 21 great-grandchildren. He died in Grand Rapids, Michigan. He was preceded in death by his daughter, Pamela Rae and his son, Robert Floyd. His son Charles Jr and daughter Sandra survive.
