= Union High School (Grand Rapids, Michigan) =

Location
- 1800 Tremont Boulevard NW; Grand Rapids, Michigan; United States
- Coordinates: 42°58′24″N 85°42′44″W

Information
- Type: Public
- School district: Grand Rapids Public Schools
- Principal: Aaron Roussey
- Faculty: 61.66 (FTE)
- Grades: 9 to 12
- Age range: 14 to 18
- Enrollment: 881 (2024–2025)
- Student to teacher ratio: 14.29
- Colors: Red and white
- Athletics conference: OK Black
- Nickname: Red Hawks
- Website: grps.org/schools/high-school/union-hs/

Union High School is one of the five high schools in Grand Rapids Public School district. Union has a student population of around 1,200 students for the 2010/2011 school year. The former principal was Justin Jennings. Union offers a wide range of opportunities for students the Grand Rapids area, it is the Art Hub for all art classes in the district and is the home of the School of Construction and Design.

Union is a diverse school. Within the school there are students from many cultural backgrounds, it is common to hear multiple languages be spoken throughout the building, by both staff and students. Union's mascot is the Red Hawk and the school has a strong athletics program, a strong ROTC program, offers a wide range of after school opportunities and has a diverse collection of elective courses.

In the 2012/2013 school year, the principal was Karl Nelson and Belinda Jimenez, Aaron Roussey, and Jessica Maat were assistant principals. As of the 2021 school year, Aaron Roussey is principal. Jessica Maat and Dana Bachelder are assistant principals.

== History ==
Union Primary on First Street was annexed by the City of Grand Rapids in 1850 from Walker Township. The city built a new school building on Fourth Street in 1854 and began adding high school grades in 1859 but did not add 12th grade until 1912.
