= Kent Intermediate School District =

School district in Kent County, Michigan, United States

Address
- 2930 Knapp Street NE Grand Rapids, Kent County, Michigan, 49525; United States
- Coordinates: 42.9964° N, 85.5985° W

District information
- Type: Intermediate School District
- Grades: PreK–12
- Superintendent: Dr. Ron Gorman
- NCES District ID: 2680620
- District ID: MI-41000

Students and staff
- Enrollment: 4,007 (2019-2020)
- Staff: 1,600 (FTE)
- Student–teacher ratio: 12.82

Other information
- Website: www.kentisd.org

Kent Intermediate School District (KISD) is an Educational Service Agency in Grand Rapids, Michigan.

The KISD provides services to twenty local public districts and to all non-public schools within its boundaries. Directly or indirectly, Kent ISD serves almost 400 schools, more than 120,000 students and 7,000 educators.

Kent ISD also operates the Kent Career Technical Center that offers a variety of programs available for no cost for high school juniors and seniors.

== Campus ==
Kent ISD features a large campus covering land between East Beltline, Knapp Street, and Leffingwell NE. Kent Career Technical Center occupies one of the five main buildings. Additionally, Kent Transition Center (KTC), Kent Innovation High and Kent Education Center-Beltline (KEC-Beltline) are located on the campus.

== MySchool@Kent ==
Kent ISD also offers an online high school course known as MySchool@Kent. It is run through Apex Learning.
