= Creston High School (Michigan) =

High school in Michigan, United States

Coordinates: 42.9929°N 85.6603°W

Location
- 1720 Plainfield Ave. NE; United States

Information
- Type: High School
- Established: 1923

Creston High School opened in 1923 as Creston Junior High School, with its first class graduating in 1927. This school was one of the five high schools in Grand Rapids, Michigan. At its peak, it housed around one thousand students and over fifty teachers making the teacher to student ratio about 1:20. The school mascot was the polar bear. The colors were blue and gold.

== Closure ==
In 2012 the district administration proposed closure of Creston, on the basis of an enrollment decrease, as part of a plan to shutter ten campuses. Monica Scott of MLive wrote that "biggest push back has come from closing Creston High School."

The GRPS District realignment took place for the 2013–14 school year.

== Campus ==
The building could house 1,397 students.

== Notable alumni ==
- Cameron Bradfield – football offensive tackle who played for NFL's Jacksonville Jaguars
- Carlton Brewster – football wide receiver who played for NFL's Browns, Packers, Chargers, Broncos, and Saints
- Chuck F. DeShane – football player who played for Detroit Lions from 1945 to 1949, after he coached football at Creston from 1942 to 1944
- Jim Command – former Major League Baseball player for Philadelphia Phillies
- Sparky McEwen – football quarterback and head football coach for Creston from 1996 to 2003, winning three city league titles and school's first appearance in the state championship game
- Scott S. Haraburda – U.S. Army Colonel and former president of Indiana Society of Professional Engineers
- Doug Meijer - co-chairman of supermarket Meijer
- Hank Meijer – co-chairman and CEO of supermarket Meijer
- Roger W. Wilkins – Pulitzer Prize-winning journalist and African-American civil rights leader
