= List of people from Grand Rapids, Michigan =

The following is a list of notable people associated with Grand Rapids, Michigan. These people were born or lived in Grand Rapids.

== Artists and artisans ==
- Mathias Alten — impressionist painter
- Jeffrey Brown — comic book creator
- Frederick Stuart Church — illustrator
- Kreigh Collins — painter; cartoonist
- Paul Collins — painter
- Dirk Gringhuis — illustrator
- Sam Kieth - comic book creator
- Daniel Vosovic — clothing designer

== Business, industry, academic and labor figures ==
- Clayton Allen — entrepreneur
- Steve Belkin — founder and chairman of Trans National Group
- Hattie Beverly — teacher
- Owen Bieber — president of United Auto Workers
- Anna Sutherland Bissell — chief executive officer of Bissell
- Charles Sumner Burch — editor of Grand Rapids Evening Press
- Mary de Young — professor of sociology; author
- Dick DeVos — chief executive officer of Amway
- Richard DeVos — co-founder of Amway
- Keith DeVries — archaeologist
- Anthony Diekema — former president of Calvin College
- Gerald Rudolff Ford — businessman; chairman of Kent County Republican Committee; stepfather of Gerald Ford
- Arnold Gingrich — founder of Esquire magazine
- James Hackett — businessman; Steelcase, Ford Motor Company
- John A. Hannah — president of Michigan State College
- H. Wayne Huizenga — entrepreneur
- Loraine Immen — first president of the Grand Rapids City Federation of Women's Clubs
- Hugh Newell Jacobsen — Modernist architect
- Jack Loeks — movie theater entrepreneur
- Kenneth Marin — professor of economics; member of White House Consumer Advisory Council
- Frank E. McGurrin — inventor of touch typing
- M. Peter McPherson — president of Michigan State University; chairman of Dow Jones
- Doug Meijer — co-chairman of supermarket Meijer
- Hank Meijer — co-chairman and CEO of supermarket Meijer
- Agnes Nestor — labor leader
- John Pease — professor of sociology
- Marshall Purnell — president of American Institute of Architects
- John Herman Randall Jr. — professor of philosophy
- Charles Ryskamp — professor at Princeton and museum director
- Henry F. Schaefer, III — professor of chemistry
- L. William Seidman — economist and financial commentator
- Ossian Cole Simonds — landscape designer
- Carl J. Strikwerda — president of Elizabethtown College
- Mel Trotter — rescue mission director
- Jay Van Andel — co-founder of Amway
- Robert J. Vanderbei — Princeton University professor
- John Philip Wernette — president of the University of New Mexico
- Roger Wilkins — civil rights leader and professor

== Criminals ==
- Gwendolyn Graham and Cathy Wood

== Entertainment figures ==
- Gillian Anderson — television and film actress
- Ford Beebe — film director
- Otto Brower — film director
- James T. Callahan — film and television actor
- Horace B. Carpenter — film actor and director
- Jim Cash — screenwriter
- Riley Chamberlin — silent film actor
- Rex Cherryman — stage and film actor
- Shawn Christian — television and film actor
- Wanda Cochran — soprano
- Steven Ford — television and film actor
- Stephen Goosson — film set designer
- Lorna Gray — film actress
- Stacey Haiduk — television actress
- Thom Hartmann — radio personality
- Paul Walter Hauser — television and film actor and comedian
- Adam Herz — screenwriter and producer
- Phillips Holmes — early film actor
- Jimmy Jacobs — professional wrestler
- Matt Keeslar — television and film actor
- Lisa Kelly — ice road trucker
- James Kirkwood Sr. — film actor and director
- Eric Allan Kramer — television, film and stage actor
- Taylor Lautner — television and film actor
- Victor Lundberg — radio personality
- C. Cameron Macauley — filmmaker
- Violet MacMillan — vaudeville, stage and silent film actress
- Kevin Matthews — radio personality
- Ryan O'Reilly — professional wrestler
- Colleen O'Shaughnessey — voice actress
- Wally Phillips — radio personality
- Don Quinn — comedy writer and cartoonist
- Andy Richter — television and film actor
- Leonard Schrader — screenwriter and director
- Paul Schrader — screenwriter and director
- Richard Shoberg — television actor
- Noah Sife — television actor
- Jackie Swanson — television and film actress
- Ray Teal — television and film actor
- Reed Timmer — storm chaser and meteorologist
- Jess Walton — television actress
- Elizabeth Wilson — stage, television and film actress
- Dick York — television, stage, radio and film actor
- Ginger Zee — ABC News meteorologist
- Kim Zimmer — television and stage actress

== Government officials, politicians and activists ==
- Russell A. Alger — governor of Michigan; U.S. secretary of war
- Justin Amash — U.S. congressman
- John Ball — pioneer; member of the Michigan State Legislature
- Charles E. Belknap — Union Army captain; U.S. congressman
- Harvey Hollister Bundy — special assistant to the U.S. secretary of war
- Edmund Burfoot — member of Michigan House of Representatives
- Charles C. Comstock — U.S. congressman from Michigan; mayor of Grand Rapids
- Robert Danhof — jurist
- Vern Ehlers — U.S. congressman from Michigan
- William Montague Ferry Jr. — Michigan and Utah politician
- Betty Ford — 37th First Lady of the United States
- Gerald R. Ford — 38th president of the United States
- Wilder D. Foster — U.S. congressman from Michigan; mayor of Grand Rapids
- George Heartwell — mayor of Grand Rapids
- Paul B. Henry — U.S. congressman
- Julius Houseman — U.S. congressman; mayor of Grand Rapids
- Bartel J. Jonkman — U.S. congressman from Michigan
- Frank Knox — U.S. secretary of the Navy; vice presidential candidate in the 1936 U.S. presidential election
- Terri Lynn Land — Michigan secretary of state
- Louise Little — mother of Malcolm X
- John H. Logie — mayor of Grand Rapids
- Brian Mast — U.S. representative for Florida
- Peter Meijer — U.S. congressman; son of Hank Meijer
- Frederick Henry Mueller — U.S. secretary of commerce
- Agnes Nestor — women's suffrage and workers' rights activist
- Lyman Parks — mayor of Grand Rapids
- Helen Cary Russell — president, Grand Rapids Federation of Women's Clubs; president, Michigan State Federation of Women's Clubs
- Michael Sak — state representative
- Harold S. Sawyer — U.S. congressman
- Hillary Scholten — U.S. congresswoman
- Peter F. Secchia — U.S. ambassador to Italy
- William Alden Smith — U.S. senator
- Glenn Steil Sr. — member of the Michigan Senate
- K. William Stinson — U.S. congressman from Washington
- Edwin F. Sweet — U.S. congressman, mayor of Grand Rapids
- Jerald terHorst — press secretary under President Gerald Ford
- Edwin F. Uhl — U.S. assistant secretary of state; mayor of Grand Rapids
- Arthur H. Vandenberg — 88th president pro tempore of the U.S. Senate
- Guy Vander Jagt — U.S. congressman from Michigan
- Richard VanderVeen — U.S. congressman
- Martha Lee Walters — 43rd chief justice of the Oregon Supreme Court
- Gretchen Whitmer — governor of Michigan
- Roger Wilkins — U.S. assistant attorney general; attended Creston High School

== Military figures ==
- Keith Clark — U.S. Army bugler who played "Taps" at the funeral of President John F. Kennedy
- Arthur B. Engel — U.S. Coast Guard rear admiral
- Benjamin F. Engel — U.S. Coast Guard vice admiral
- Eugene F. George — U.S. Navy sailor and Navy Cross recipient
- Scott S. Haraburda — U.S. Army colonel and president of the Indiana Society of Professional Engineers
- John C. Sjogren — U.S. Army staff sergeant and Medal of Honor recipient
- Stephen A. Turcotte — U.S. Navy rear admiral
- Dirk J. Vlug — U.S. Army private first class and Medal of Honor recipient

== Musicians and bands ==
- Pennjamin Bannekar — independent music artist and songwriter
- Dave Bixby — folk musician
- Ralston Bowles — folk musician
- Mary Canberg — violinist
- The Cardboard Swords — pop-rock band
- The Crane Wives — indie rock band
- Jeffrey Daniel — member of R&B group Shalamar
- Xavier Davis — jazz pianist
- DeBarge — R&B/soul group
- Dennis "Fergie" Frederiksen — vocalist (formerly of Toto)
- Al Green — R&B/soul singer
- Bob Hay — member of the Squalls
- Adina Howard — R&B singer
- Charlie Huhn — frontman for Foghat
- Maynard James Keenan — lead singer of Tool
- Anthony Kiedis — lead singer of the Red Hot Chili Peppers
- La the Darkman — hip hop artist affiliated with Wu-Tang Clan
- La Dispute — post-hardcore group
- Robert Longfield — composer
- Kevin Max — member of dc Talk
- Ken Medema — Christian musician
- Kellin Quinn — member of post-hardcore/alternative rock band Sleeping With Sirens
- John W. Peterson — Christian songwriter
- Mustard Plug — ska punk group
- Pop Evil — hard rock band
- Marvin Sapp — gospel singer, and member of the group Commissioned
- Del Shannon — rock & roll musician
- Sleeping with Sirens — alternative rock/post-hardcore band
- SoFaygo — rapper
- Leo Sowerby — composer and musician
- Still Remains — metalcore group
- Casey Stratton — pop/rock musician
- Sam Stryke — composer and pianist
- Helena Stone Torgerson — harpist and composer
- Whirlwind Heat — alternative rock group
- Willie the Kid — rapper
- Jason Wood — lead singer of It Dies Today

== Religious figures ==
- Rob Bell — founding pastor of Mars Hill Bible Church; author
- Martin H. Carmody — Supreme Knight of the Knights of Columbus
- M. R. DeHaan — Bible teacher, founder of the Radio Bible Class
- Michael Gallagher — bishop of Grand Rapids
- Francis J. Haas — bishop of Grand Rapids
- Edward D. Kelly — bishop of Grand Rapids
- Isaac McCoy — Baptist missionary
- Joseph Crescent McKinney — auxiliary bishop of Grand Rapids
- Joseph G. Pinten — bishop of Grand Rapids
- Charles Salatka — archbishop of Oklahoma City
- Robert Sirico — co-founder of the Acton Institute
- Edmund Szoka — president of the Pontifical Commission for Vatican City State

== Science ==
- Roger Chaffee — NASA astronaut, U.S. Navy lieutenant commander
- Jewell James Ebers — transistor-theory electrical engineer
- Christina Koch — NASA astronaut, engineer
- Jack R. Lousma — NASA astronaut, U.S. Marine Corps colonel
- Lynn Rogers — biologist

== Sports figures ==
- Vince Agnew — NFL player
- George Andrie — NFL player
- Dan Archer — NFL player
- Paul Assenmacher — MLB player
- Jim Avery — NFL player
- John Barnum — PGA Tour golfer
- Terry Barr — NFL player
- Albrey Battle — gridiron football player
- Johnny Benson — NASCAR driver
- Ray Bentley — NFL player
- Harry Berrios — baseball player
- Marcus Bingham Jr. (born 2000) — basketball player for Hapoel Haifa of the Israeli Basketball Premier League
- Israel Boatwright — soccer player
- Devin Booker — NBA player
- Drayson Bowman — NHL player
- Jim Boylen — NBA assistant coach
- Cameron Bradfield — NFL player
- David Brandt — NFL player
- Andrew Bremer — cerebral palsy soccer player
- Carlton Brewster — NFL player
- Kobe Bufkin — NBA player
- Kelly Butler — NFL player
- Geno Carlisle — basketball player
- Dženan Ćatić — soccer player
- Bill Cutler — baseball executive
- Chuck DeShane — NFL player
- Al DeVormer — MLB player
- Mark Dewey — MLB player
- Brian Diemer — track and field athlete
- Mike Donald — PGA Tour golfer
- Allie Dragoo — professional cyclist
- Jim Dreyer — ultramarathon athlete
- Mike Dumas — NFL player
- Katie Feenstra — Women's National Basketball Association player
- Julius Franks — All-American college football player
- Brent Gates — MLB player
- Julie Glass — roller derby and competitive speed skater
- Luke Glendening — NHL player
- Paul G. Goebel — NFL player; naval officer; mayor of Grand Rapids
- Paul Grasmanis — NFL player
- Ben Handlogten — NBA player
- David Harris — NFL player
- Jamahal Hill — mixed martial artist
- Gary Hogeboom — NFL player
- Marilyn Jenkins — All-American Girls Professional Baseball League player
- Josh Kalis — skateboarder
- Chris Kaman — NBA player
- Stanley Ketchel — middleweight boxer
- Marshawn Kneeland — NFL player
- Mike Knuble — NHL player
- Lauren Kozal — National Women's Soccer League (NWSL) goalkeeper
- Rick Kreuger — Major League Baseball player
- Marion Ladewig — bowler
- Doc Lavan — MLB player
- Pete Lee — Olympic and world champion wrestler
- Bob Lurtsema — NFL player
- Mitch Lyons — NFL player
- Buster Mathis Jr. — heavyweight boxer
- Jalen Mayfield — NFL player
- Floyd Mayweather Jr. — welterweight boxer
- Floyd Mayweather Sr. — welterweight boxer
- Jeff Mayweather — super featherweight boxer
- Roger Mayweather — welterweight boxer
- Sparky McEwen — football player
- Greg Meyer — distance runner
- Rick Miller — MLB player
- Monté Morris — NBA player
- Terna Nande — NFL player
- Drew Neitzel — professional basketball player
- Aidan O'Connor — Major League Soccer defender
- Jim Pace — NFL player
- Wally Pipp — Major League Baseball player
- Kaleb Ort — MLB pitcher
- Peter Quillin — middleweight boxer
- John Rienstra — NFL player
- Rueben Riley — NFL player
- Dathan Ritzenhein — distance runner
- Rocky Rosema — NFL player
- Dave Rozema — MLB player
- Doris Satterfield — All-American Girls Professional Baseball League player
- Steve Scheffler — NBA player
- Betsy Snite — Olympic skiing silver medalist
- Joe Soboleski — NFL player
- Mickey Stanley — MLB player
- Matt Steigenga — NBA player
- Frank Steketee — All-American college football player
- Lou Stringer — MLB player
- Xavier Tillman — NBA player
- James Toney — heavyweight boxer
- Tony Tucker — heavyweight boxer
- John Vander Wal — MLB player
- Loy Vaught — NBA player
- Jared Veldheer — NFL player
- Dave Walsh — professional gamer
- Casper Wells — MLB player
- Jack Wisner — MLB player

== Writers, novelists, poets and journalists ==
- Max Apple — short story writer, novelist and screenwriter
- Anne W. Armstrong — novelist
- William Brashler — novelist and journalist
- Andrew Britton — novelist
- Robert Forrest Burgess — outdoors writer and photographer
- Peter De Vries — editor and novelist
- Meindert DeJong — children's author
- Arnold Gingrich — founder of Esquire magazine
- LZ Granderson — sports writer
- Lloyd Kropp — novelist, composer and educator
- Robie Macauley — novelist, literary critic and educator
- Harold Matson — literary agent
- Chris Molnar — writer, editor and publisher of Archway Editions
- Ander Monson — novelist and poet
- Bich Minh Nguyen — novelist and nonfiction writer
- Mary Jo Salter — poet
- Gary Schmidt — children's writer of nonfiction books and young adult novels
- Watson Spoelstra — sportswriter
- Michael Talbot — science writer
- Chris Van Allsburg — children's author and illustrator
- Stewart Edward White — author
