= Struyk =

Struyk is a surname. Notable people with the surname include:

- Doug Struyk (born 1970), American politician
- Sam Struyk (born 1970), real name of artist Sam Stryke, American composer and contemporary pianist
