= Keith Clark =

Keith Clark may refer to:

- Keith Clark (bugler), American bugler
- Keith Clark (computer scientist), British computer scientist
- Keith Clark (conductor), American conductor
