= Burfoot =

Burfoot is a surname. Notable people with the surname include:

- Amby Burfoot (born 1946), American marathoner
- Edmund Burfoot (1858–1938), American politician
- Nikolas Burfoot, New Zealand sailor
- Sam Burfoot (born 1994), English footballer
