= Stan Stearns =

American photojournalist (1935-2012)

- Born: Stanley Frank Stearns; May 11, 1935; Annapolis, Maryland
- Died: March 2, 2012 (aged 76)

Stanley Frank "Stan" Stearns (May 11, 1935 – March 2, 2012) was an American photographer who captured the iconic image of a three-year-old John F. Kennedy Jr. saluting the coffin of his father, US President John F. Kennedy, at his father's funeral.

== Biography ==
Born in Annapolis, Maryland, Stearns spent four years in the United States Air Force as a photographer for Stars and Stripes before joining United Press International in 1958. Mr. Stearns covered the end of the Eisenhower administration, and rose to prominence after covering Kennedy's funeral and the presidential administrations of Lyndon Johnson and Richard Nixon. His image of the John-John salute is one of the most-published photographs in the world and was a front-runner for the Pulitzer Prize for Photography for 1964, but lost out to Jack Ruby Shoots Lee Harvey Oswald, which was the photo of Jack Ruby shooting Kennedy's assassin, Lee Harvey Oswald. Stearns was elected president of the White House News Photographers Association in 1969, and hosted a black tie dinner for President Nixon and Vice President Agnew.

After he left UPI in late 1970, Stearns returned to his hometown of Annapolis and opened a downtown studio. He photographed many well-known celebrities and politicians as well as prominent local residents, right up until his last days. His existing clients and archives are now maintained by his friend and fellow Annapolis photographer, David Anderson.
