= Foreign military units at the state funeral of John F. Kennedy =

Foreign military units at the state funeral of John Kennedy included elements of the British Army and Irish Army. As of 2017, it is the only state funeral of a president of the United States in which foreign military forces have participated.

== Black Watch Regiment ==
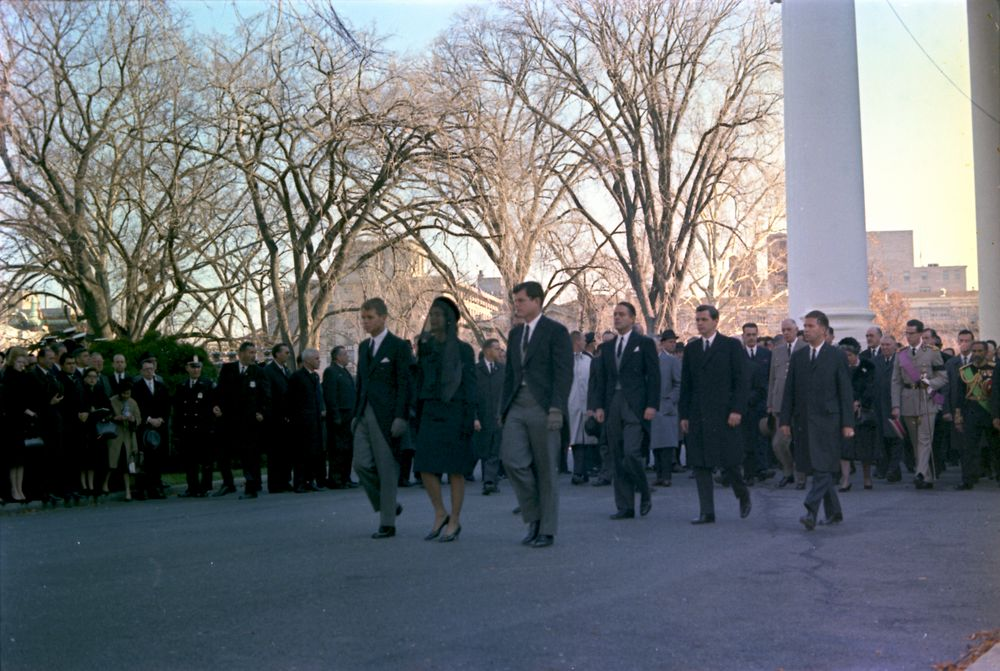
The presence of elements of the British and Irish armies at the state funeral of John Kennedy was requested by Jacqueline Kennedy, shown here during the funeral procession.

In late 1963, the band of the Black Watch Regiment conducted a three-month performance tour of the United States. Several days before John F. Kennedy's assassination, the band was invited to undertake a charity performance on the South Lawn of the White House. Kennedy observed the performance from the Truman Balcony with his children John Kennedy, Jr. and Caroline Kennedy. According to some accounts, Jacqueline Kennedy later remarked it was the last time she had seen the president happy before his death.

The band was still in the United States at the time of the assassination, having just completed a performance in Knoxville, Tennessee. Jacqueline Kennedy requested their participation in the funeral procession, a request which was accommodated by eight pipers and a Pipe Major. The contingent was the twenty-fourth element of 32 that made-up the procession.

== Irish Defence Forces 37th Cadet Class ==
The Irish Defence Forces 37th Cadet Class is seen at parade rest, behind the open grave, in the foreground of this film showing the arrival of the funeral procession at Arlington National Cemetery.

During the state visit of the United States to Ireland in June 1963, John Kennedy was invited to participate in a wreath-laying ceremony at Arbor Hill Cemetery where leaders of the Easter Rising were interred. The ceremony involved the performance of the Queen Anne drill, an Irish military drill performed during funerary rites, by a contingent of cadets from the 36th Cadet Class of the Irish Defence Forces. Kennedy reportedly later remarked to Irish Army Lt. Frank Colclough that it was "the finest honor guard he had ever seen".

Following his return to Washington, Kennedy requested a film of the maneuver be created and sent to the White House for his personal study. A new group of cadets from the 37th Cadet Class was assembled by the Irish Defence Forces to execute the maneuver for a camera crew.

After the assassination, and recalling Kennedy's fascination with the Queen Anne drill, Jacqueline Kennedy requested that Ireland send a contingent of cadets to the funeral to execute it graveside during interment. The Irish Army dispatched 26 cadets from the Irish Defence Forces 37th Cadet Class to accompany President of Ireland Éamon de Valera to the funeral. The party flew via commercial aircraft and, on arrival in the United States, were greeted aboard their plane by United States Secretary of State Dean Rusk and then transported to Fort Myer, Virginia, where they were quartered. Following the funeral, the detachment returned to Ireland. Among the participating cadets was Richard Heaslip, future father of Jamie Heaslip.

In 2013, on the occasion of the fiftieth anniversary of the death of Kennedy, eleven of the former cadets visited Kennedy's tomb at Arlington National Cemetery, along with five members of the 2013 class of cadets who again performed the Queen Anne drill at graveside. During the visit, the former cadets presented one of the Lee–Enfield rifles used in 1963 to the cemetery's archives.

== See also ==
- State funeral of John F. Kennedy
