= State funeral of John F. Kennedy =

1963 funeral of the 35th U.S. president

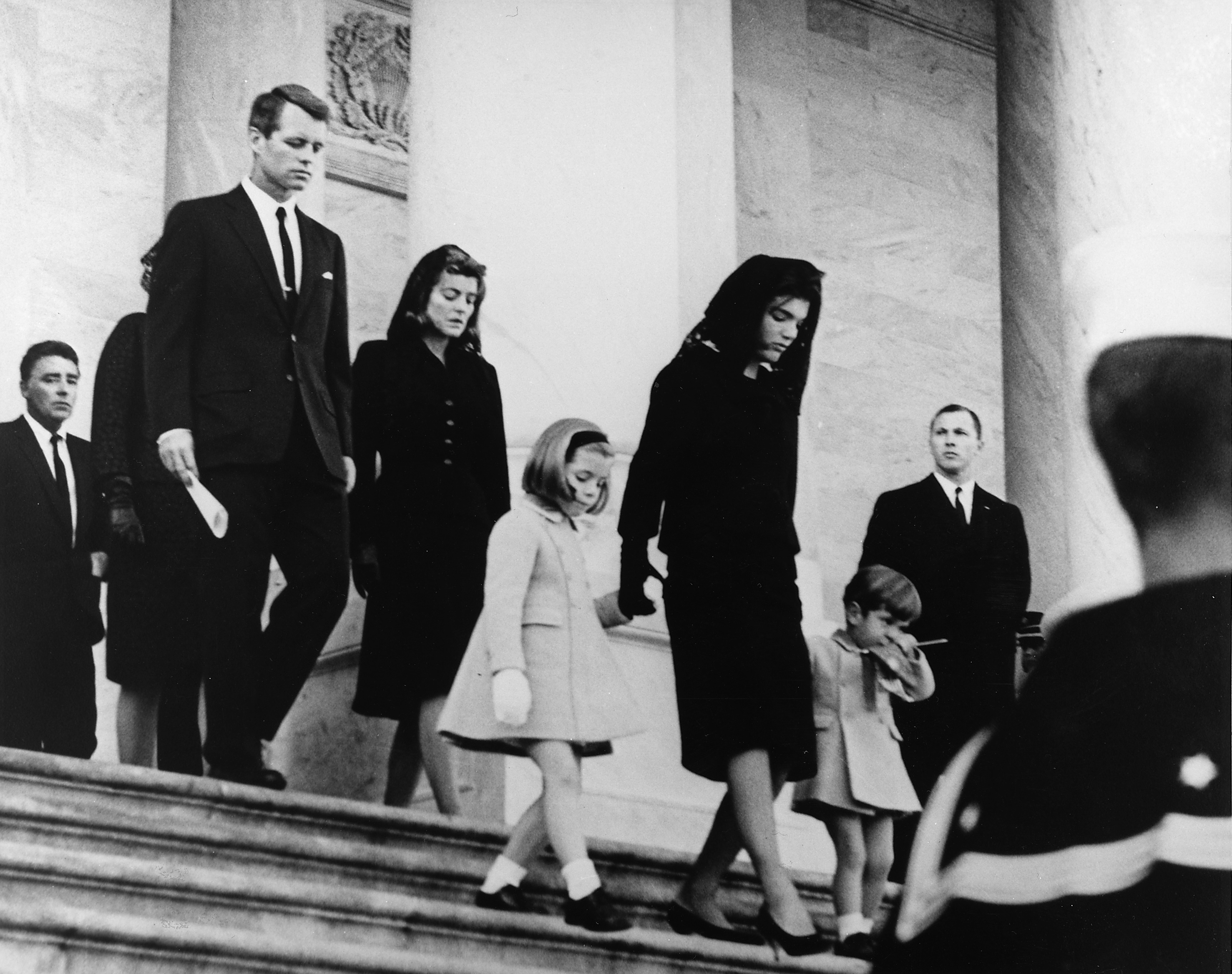
- Family members of John F. Kennedy, including former First Lady Jacqueline Kennedy, descending the steps of the United States Capitol after viewing his lying in state.
- Date: November 23–25, 1963
- Location: Washington, D.C., Virginia
- Type: State funeral
- Organized by: Jacqueline Kennedy; Military District of Washington (MDW)
- Participants: Harry S. Truman; Dwight D. Eisenhower; Lyndon B. Johnson; Robert F. Kennedy; Ted Kennedy; Members of the 88th Congress
- Burial: Arlington National Cemetery

The state funeral of U.S. president John F. Kennedy took place in Washington, D.C. and Virginia, during the three days that followed his assassination on Friday, November 22, 1963, in Dallas, Texas.

Kennedy's body was brought back to Washington after his assassination. Early on November 23, six military pallbearers carried the flag-draped coffin into the East Room of the White House, where he lay in repose for 24 hours. Then, his flag-draped coffin was carried on a horse-drawn caisson to the Capitol to lie in state. Throughout the day and night, hundreds of thousands lined up to view the guarded casket, with a quarter million passing through the rotunda during the 18 hours of lying in state.

Kennedy's funeral service was held on November 25 at St. Matthew's Cathedral. The Requiem Mass was led by Cardinal Richard Cushing. About 1,200 guests, including representatives from over 90 countries, attended. After the service, Kennedy was buried at Arlington National Cemetery in Virginia.

== Preparations for the state funeral ==
After President John F. Kennedy was assassinated in Dallas, his body was flown back to Washington, and taken to Bethesda Naval Hospital for the autopsy. At the same time, military authorities began making arrangements for a state funeral. Army Major General Philip C. Wehle, the commanding general of the Military District of Washington (MDW) (CG MDW), and retired Army Colonel Paul C. Miller, chief of ceremonies and special events at the MDW, planned the funeral.

They headed to the White House and worked with the president's brother-in-law, Sargent Shriver, also director of the Peace Corps, and Ralph Dungan, an aide to the president. Because President Kennedy had no funeral plan in place, much of the planning rested with the CG MDW. House speaker John W. McCormack said that the president's body would be brought back to the White House to lie in the East Room the following day and then taken to the Capitol to lie in state in the rotunda all day Sunday.

Kennedy's widow, Jacqueline "Jackie" Kennedy worked with chief usher J.B. West to incorporate details from the funeral of President Abraham Lincoln, who was also assassinated in office, and asked that the East Room look like when Lincoln lay there.

The day after the assassination, the new president, Lyndon B. Johnson, issued Presidential Proclamation 3561, declaring Monday to be a national day of mourning, and only essential emergency workers to be at their posts. He read the proclamation over a nationwide radio and television broadcast at 4:45 p.m. from the Fish Room of the White House.

Several elements of the state funeral paid tribute to President Kennedy's service in the Navy during World War II. They included a member of the Navy bearing the presidential flag, the playing of the Navy Hymn, "Eternal Father, Strong to Save," and the Naval Academy Glee Club performing at the White House.

== White House repose ==
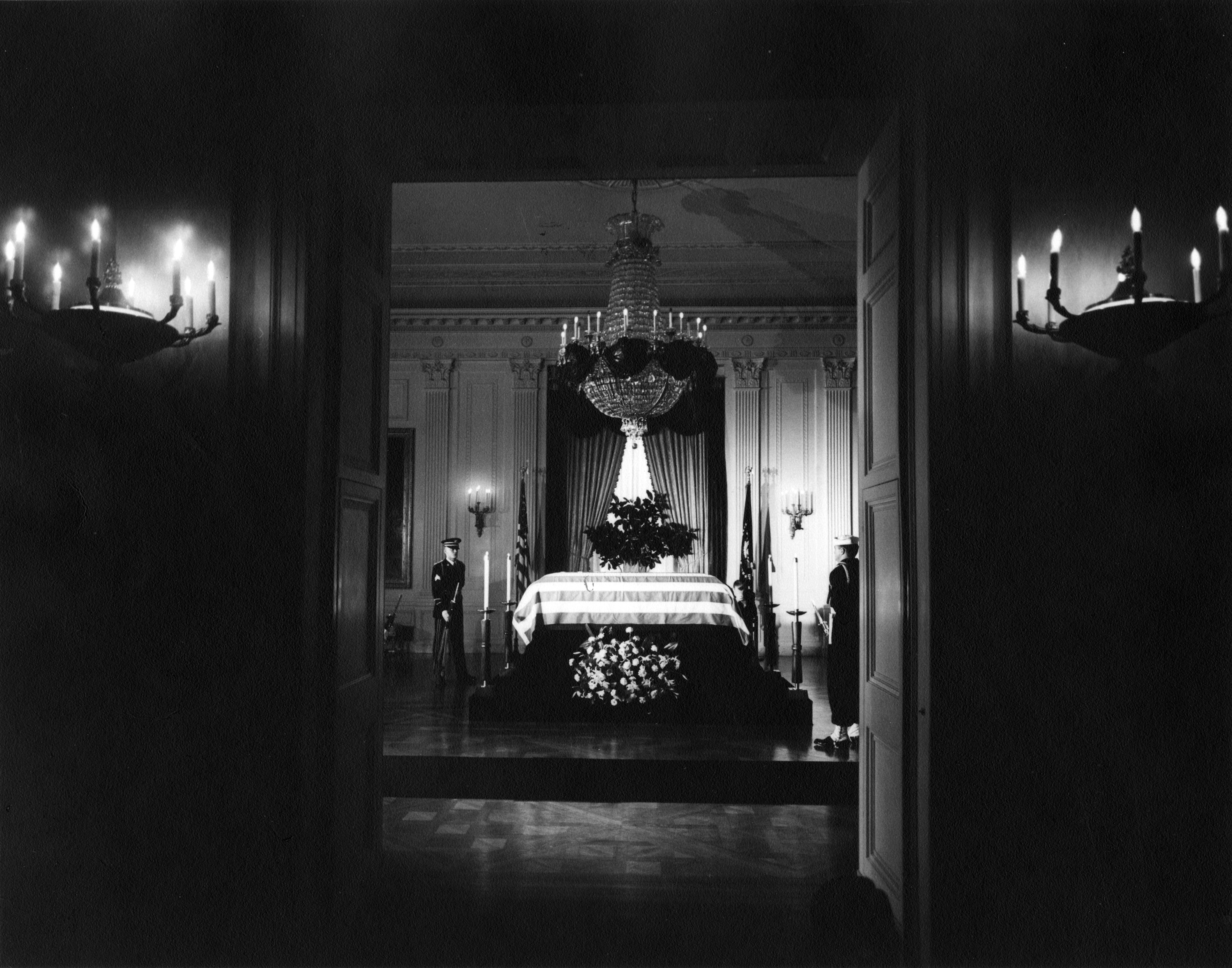
U.S president John F. Kennedy lies in repose in the White House East Room.

After the autopsy at Bethesda Naval Hospital, President Kennedy's body was prepared for burial by embalmers from Gawler's Funeral Home in Washington, who performed the embalming and cosmetic restoration procedures at Bethesda. He was dressed in a bluish-gray pinstriped suit with a white shirt, black shoes, and blue tie with dots while a Catholic rosary was placed in his hands. Afterwards, he was put in a new mahogany casket in place of the bronze casket used to transport the body from Dallas, which had been damaged in transit.

President Kennedy's body was returned to the White House at about 4:30 a.m. EST on Saturday, November 23. The motorcade bearing the remains was met at the White House gate by a U.S. Marine Corps honor guard, which escorted it to the North Portico. The pallbearers bore the casket to the East Room and placed it on Lincoln's catafalque, also previously used for the funerals of the Unknown Soldiers from the Korean War and World War II at Arlington. Jacqueline Kennedy declared that the casket would be kept closed for the viewing and funeral. The shot to President Kennedy's head left a gaping wound, and religious leaders said a closed casket minimized morbid concentration on the body.

Mrs. Kennedy, still wearing the blood-stained suit she wore in Dallas, had not left the side of her husband's body since he was shot. Only after the casket was placed in the East Room, draped with black crêpe, did she retire to her private quarters.

President Kennedy's body lay in repose in the East Room for 24 hours, attended by an honor guard including troops from the 3rd Infantry and from the Army's Special Forces (Green Berets). The Special Forces troops had been brought hurriedly from Fort Bragg in North Carolina, at the request of U.S. attorney general Robert F. Kennedy, who was aware of his brother's particular interest in them.

Mrs. Kennedy requested two Catholic priests to remain with the body until the official funeral. A call was made to the Catholic University of America, and Msgr. Robert Paul Mohan and Fr. Gilbert Hartke, two prominent Washington, D.C., priests, were immediately dispatched for the task.

Defense Secretary Robert McNamara visited Arlington National Cemetery to inspect a possible gravesite for Kennedy at 9:00 a.m. on Saturday, November 23. A solemn Mass was celebrated for family in the East Room at 10:30 a.m. Fr. M. Frank Ruppert of St. Matthew's Cathedral Parish would celebrate another Mass in the East Room the following day. After the Mass, other family members, friends, and other government officials came at specified times to pay their respects to President Kennedy. This included former U.S. presidents Harry S. Truman and Dwight D. Eisenhower. The other surviving former U.S. president at the time, Herbert Hoover, was too ill to attend the state funeral, and was represented by his sons, Herbert Jr. and Allan.

In addition, family members and friends accompanied McNamara back to Arlington. Jackie later decided to have her husband join William Howard Taft as the only presidents to be buried at Arlington, and that he be buried on a slope leading up to the Robert E. Lee Mansion, directly in line with the Lincoln Memorial.

In Lafayette Park, across the street from the White House, crowds stood in the rain, keeping the vigil they began the day before and would continue through the funeral. It rained all day in Washington, befitting the mood of the nation.

== Lying in state ==
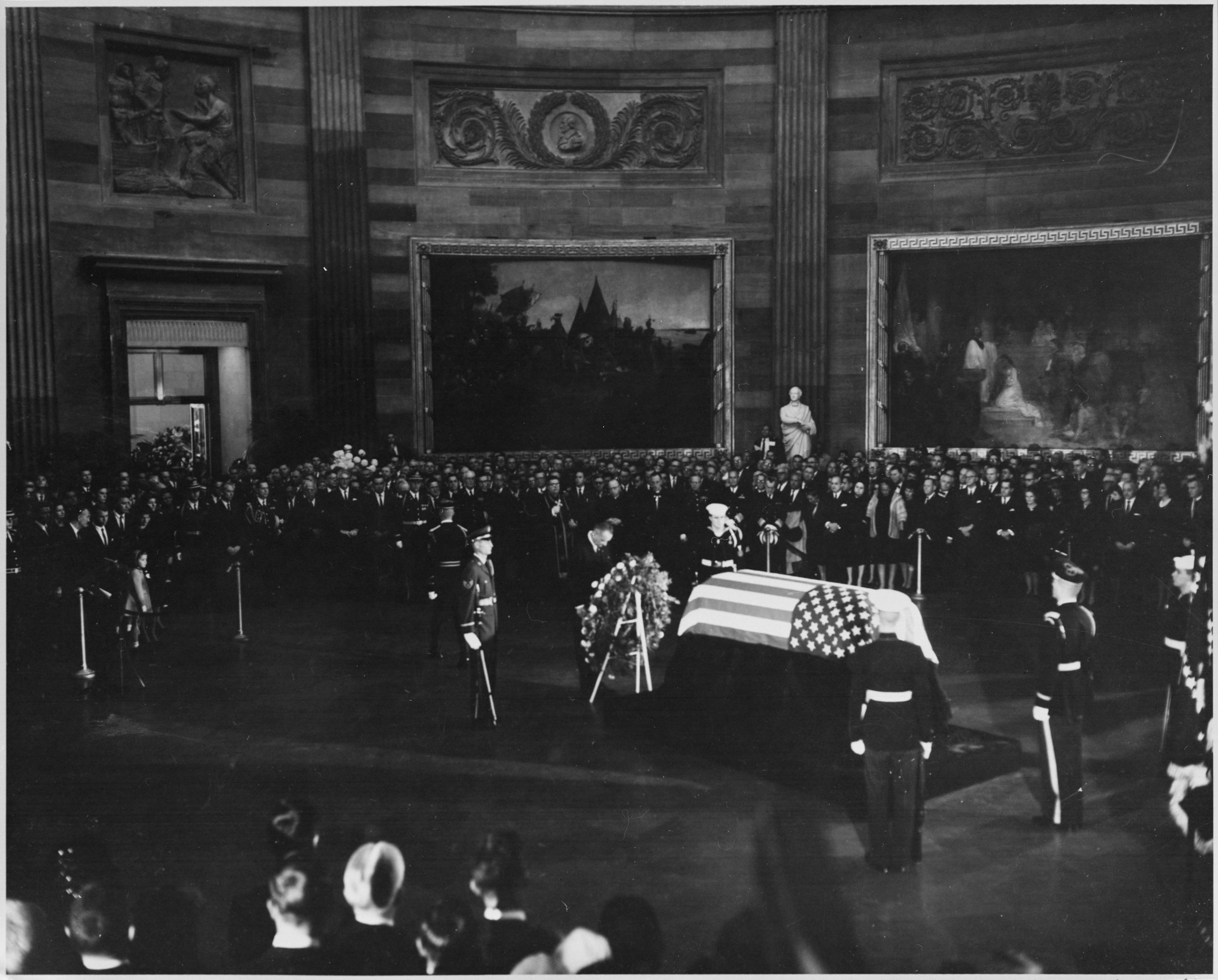
President Lyndon B. Johnson placing a wreath before the flag-draped casket of President Kennedy, during funeral services held in the United States Capitol rotunda, November 24, 1963.

On Sunday afternoon, about 300,000 people watched a horse-drawn caisson, which had borne the body of Franklin D. Roosevelt and the Unknown Soldier, carry President Kennedy's flag-covered casket down the White House drive, past parallel rows of soldiers bearing the flags of the 50 states of the Union, then along Pennsylvania Avenue to the Capitol Rotunda to lie in state. The only sounds on Pennsylvania Avenue as the cortège made its way to the Capitol were the sounds of the muffled drums and the clacking of horses' hooves, including the riderless (caparisoned) horse Black Jack. The journalists marched and were last in the cortège as it made its way to the Capitol.

The widow, holding her two children by the hand, led the public mourning for the country. In the rotunda, Mrs. Kennedy and her daughter Caroline knelt beside the casket, which rested on the Lincoln catafalque. Three-year-old John Jr. was briefly taken out of the rotunda so as not to disrupt the service. Mrs. Kennedy maintained her composure as her husband was taken to the Capitol to lie in state, as well as during the memorial service.

Brief eulogies were delivered inside the rotunda by Senate majority leader Mike Mansfield of Montana, Chief Justice Earl Warren, and Speaker McCormack.

President Kennedy was the first president in more than 30 years to lie in state in the rotunda, the last being Taft in 1930, and the first Democrat to lie in state at the Capitol. Mrs. Kennedy's decision to have her husband buried at Arlington meant the two most recent presidents to lie in state in the Capitol would be buried at Arlington.

=== Public viewing ===
In the only public viewing, thousands lined up in near-freezing temperatures to view the casket. Over the span of 18 hours, 250,000 people, some waiting for as long as 10 hours in a line up to 10 wide that stretched 40 blocks, personally paid their respects as President Kennedy's body lay in state. United States Capitol Police officers politely reminded mourners to keep moving along in two lines that passed on either side of the casket and exited the building on the west side facing the National Mall. More than half the mourners came to the rotunda after 2:45 am, by which time 115,000 had already visited. Military officials doubled the lines, first to two abreast, then to four abreast.

The original plan was for the rotunda to close at 9:00 p.m. and reopen for an hour at 9:00 the next morning. Because of long lines police and military authorities decided to keep the doors open. At 9:00 pm, when the rotunda was supposed to close, both Jacqueline Kennedy and Robert F. Kennedy returned to the rotunda again.

While anchoring the Today show from an NBC Washington studio the next day, Hugh Downs said that the numbers made it "the greatest and most solemn wake in history." Mudd said of the numbers: "This outpouring of affection and sympathy for the late president is probably the most majestic and stately ceremony the American people can perform." Jersey Joe Walcott, a former heavyweight boxing champion, passed by the bier at 2:30 a.m. and agreed with Mudd, saying of President Kennedy, "He was a great man."

== Funeral ==
As people were viewing the casket, military authorities held meetings at the White House, at MDW headquarters, and at Arlington National Cemetery to plan Monday's events. First, they decided that the public viewing should end at 9:00 am. EST and that the ceremonies would begin at 10:30 am. EST.

Unlike Sunday's procession, which was led by only the muffled drum corps, Monday's was expanded to include other military units. Military officials also agreed to requests from Kennedy's widow, Jacqueline Kennedy. They agreed that the Marine Band should lead the funeral procession, which would include two foreign military units—10 pipers from the Scottish Black Watch (Royal Highland Regiment) marching from the White House to St. Matthew's Roman Catholic Cathedral, a group of 30 Irish Defence Forces cadets—at the request of Mrs. Kennedy—performing silent drill at the grave site, and placement of an eternal flame at the grave. The cadets came from the Curragh Camp, County Kildare, Ireland. The cadets traveled with Irish President Éamon de Valera, and together they paid tribute to Kennedy's Irish ancestry. This is the only state funeral in the United States to feature foreign military forces.

Approximately one million people lined the route of the funeral procession, from the Capitol back to the White House, then to St. Matthew's Cathedral, and finally to Arlington National Cemetery.

The day's events began at 8:25 a.m., when the MPDC cut off the line of mourners waiting to get into the rotunda, because a large group tried to break into the line and the MPDC were not able to sort out those who had already been in line, many of whom had waited for five hours. Thirty-five minutes, later, the doors closed, ending the lying in state; the last visitors passed through at 9:05 am. When the doors closed, 50,000 more were waiting outside.

Both houses of Congress met to pass resolutions expressing sorrow. In the Senate, Maine Republican senator Margaret Chase Smith laid a single rose on the desk that Kennedy had occupied when in the Senate.

=== Procession to cathedral ===
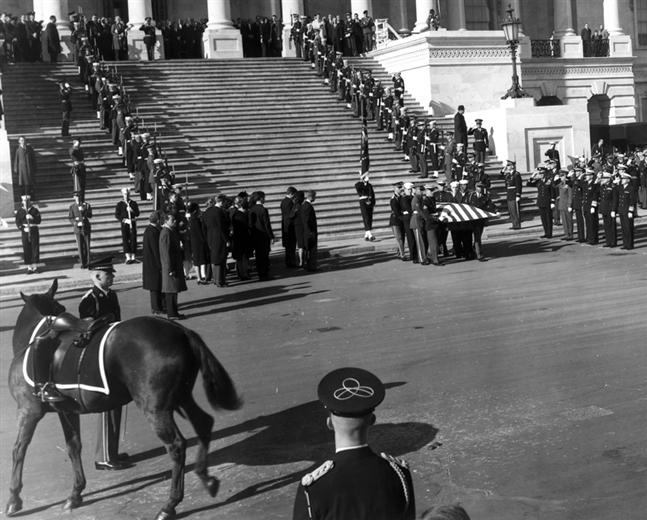
The riderless (caparisoned) horse named "Black Jack" during a departure ceremony held on the center steps at the United States Capitol Building.

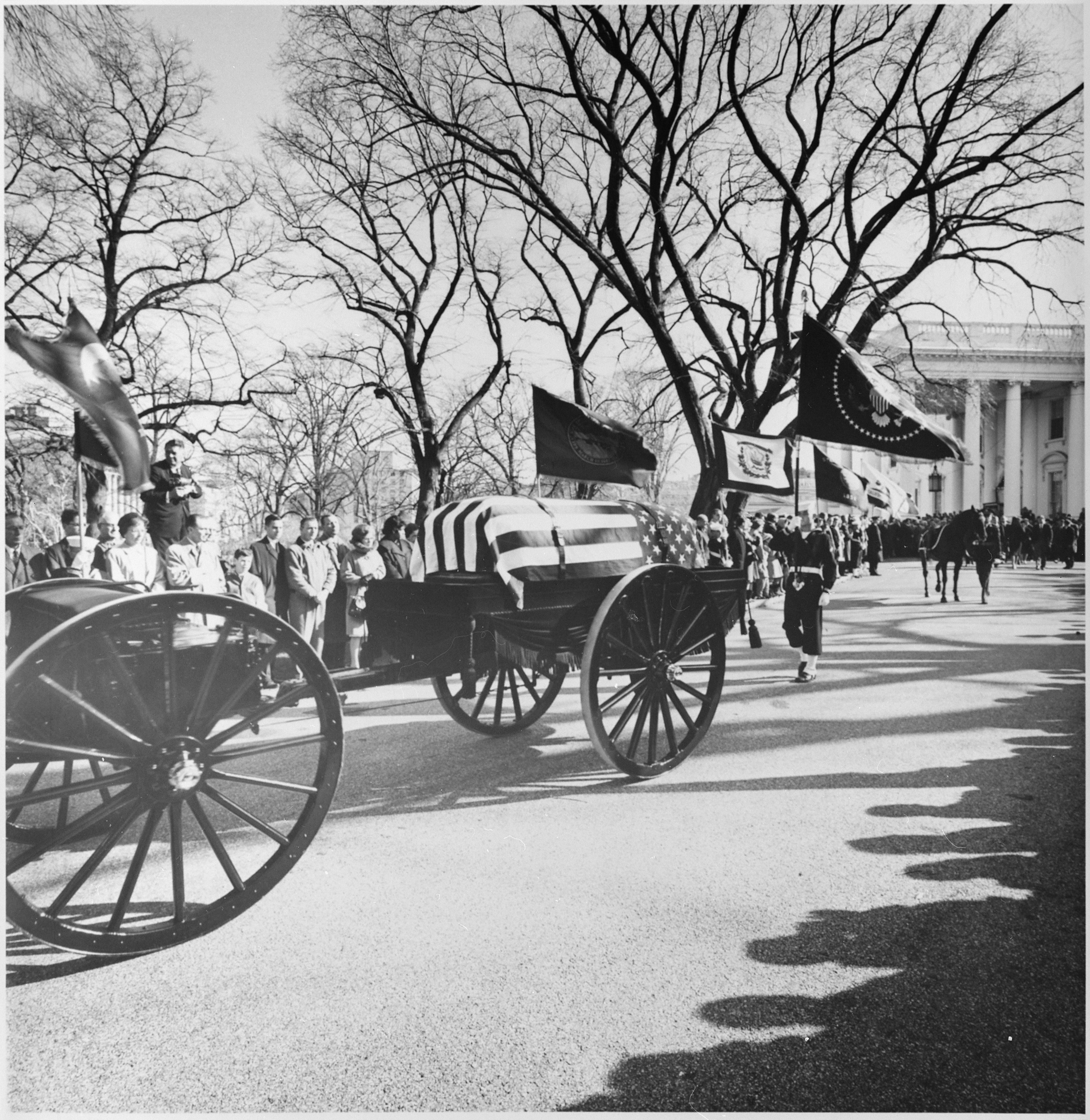
A limbers and caissons bearing the casket of U.S president John F. Kennedy seen moving down the White House drive on the way to St. Matthew's Cathedral on November 25, 1963. A color guard holding the presidential colors, the flag of the president of the United States, and the riderless horse "Black Jack", follow behind.

After Jacqueline Kennedy and her brothers-in-law, Attorney General Robert Kennedy and Massachusetts Democratic senator Ted Kennedy, visited the rotunda, the coffin was carried out onto the caisson. At 10:50, the caisson left the Capitol. Ten minutes later, the procession began, making its way back to the White House. As the procession reached the White House, all the military units except for the Marine company turned right off Pennsylvania Avenue and onto 17th Street. A platoon of the Marine company turned in the northeast gate and led the cortege into the North Portico.

At the White House, the procession resumed on foot for roughly 0.9 miles (1.4 km) to St. Matthew's Cathedral, led by Jacqueline Kennedy and the late president's brothers, Robert and Edward (Ted) Kennedy. They walked the same route that John F. Kennedy and Jacqueline Kennedy often used when going to Mass at the cathedral. This also marked the first time that a first lady walked in her husband's funeral procession. The two Kennedy children rode in a limousine behind their mother and uncles. The rest of the Kennedy family, apart from the president's father, Joseph P. Kennedy Sr., who was ill, waited at the cathedral. The elder Kennedy mourned alone in Hyannis Port.

The newly sworn in U.S. president Lyndon B. Johnson, his wife Lady Bird, and their two daughters Luci and Lynda also marched in the procession. President Johnson had been advised not to do so because of the potential risk in the wake of President Kennedy's assassination. President Johnson recounted his experiences in his memoirs, saying, "I remember marching behind the caisson to St. Matthew's Cathedral. The muffled rumble of drums set up a heartbreaking echo." He told Merle Miller: "Walking in the procession was one of the most difficult decisions I made. The FBI...and the Secret Service felt...it would be injudicious and unwise for the American president to expose himself by walking along the avenue with all the buildings on each side...I...concluded...that it was something I wanted to do, should do, and would do, and did so." When he moved into the Oval Office the next day, there was a letter from Mrs. Kennedy on his desk, which began "Thank you for walking yesterday..." The foreign dignitaries followed, though most of passed unnoticed, following respectfully behind the former First Lady and the Kennedy family during the relatively short walk to the cathedral along Connecticut Avenue.

As the dignitaries marched, there was a heavy security presence because of concerns for the potential assassination of so many world leaders, the greatest being for French president Charles de Gaulle, who had specific threats against his life. Under Secretary of State George Ball manned the operations center at the State Department with the goal of ensuring that no incident occurred. He recounted in his memoirs, The Past Has Another Pattern, that he "felt that it was imperative that a responsible official remain at the center of communications, ready to deal with such an emergency." He manned the operations center with his deputy for political affairs, U. Alexis Johnson. Rusk recounted that the biggest relief came when de Gaulle himself returned to Paris.

The widow, wearing a black veil, led the way up the steps of the cathedral holding the hands of her two children, with John Jr., whose third birthday fell on the day of his father's funeral, on her left, and Caroline on her right. Because of the funeral and the day of mourning, the widow postponed John Jr.'s birthday party until December 5, the last day the family was in the White House.

=== Funeral Mass at the cathedral ===
About 1,200 invited guests attended the funeral Mass in the cathedral. The Archbishop of Boston, Richard Cardinal Cushing, celebrated the funeral Mass at the cathedral where Kennedy, a practicing Catholic, often worshipped. Cardinal Cushing was a close friend of the family who had witnessed and blessed the marriage of Senator Kennedy and Jacqueline Bouvier in 1953. He had also baptized two of their children, given the invocation at President Kennedy's inauguration, and officiated at the recent funeral of their infant son, Patrick Bouvier Kennedy.

At the request of Mrs. Kennedy, the Requiem Mass was a Low Mass—that is, a simpler Mass, recited or spoken and not sung.

There was no formal eulogy at the Mass (as this was prohibited by the Catholic Church). However, the Roman Catholic Auxiliary bishop of Washington, the Most Reverend Philip M. Hannan, delivered the sermon with selections from Kennedy's writings and speeches. Bishop Hannan had been asked to speak by Mrs. Kennedy. The lessons included a passage from the third chapter of Ecclesiastes: "There is an appointed time for everything...a time to be born and a time to die...a time to love and a time to hate...a time of war and a time of peace." He then concluded his remarks by reading Kennedy's entire Inaugural Address.

Mrs. Kennedy requested that Luigi Vena sing Franz Schubert's Ave Maria as he did at her wedding. For a few moments, she lost her composure and sobbed as this music filled the cathedral.

=== Burial ===
John F. Kennedy Jr. salutes his father while standing next to Jacqueline Kennedy, who is holding Caroline Kennedy's hand; Senator Ted Kennedy and Attorney General Robert F. Kennedy are seen behind them.

The casket was borne again by caisson on the final leg to Arlington National Cemetery for burial. Moments after the casket was carried down the front steps of the cathedral, Jacqueline Kennedy whispered to her son, after which he saluted his father's coffin; the image, taken by photographer Stan Stearns, became an iconic representation of the 1960s.

The children were deemed to be too young to attend the final burial service, so this was the point where the children said goodbye to their father.

Virtually everyone else followed the caisson in a long line of black limousines passing by the Lincoln Memorial and crossing the Potomac River. Many of the military units did not participate in the burial service and left just after crossing the Potomac. Because the line of cars taking the foreign dignitaries was long, the last cars carrying the dignitaries left St. Matthew's as the procession entered the cemetery. The burial services had already begun when the last car arrived. Security guards walked beside the cars carrying the dignitaries, with the one carrying the French president having the most at ten.

A detachment of 30 cadets from the Irish Defense Forces, performed, at the request of Jackie Kennedy, a silent solemn graveside drill known as the Queen Anne Drill.

The burial services ended at 3:15 pm. EST, when the widow lit an eternal flame to burn continuously over his grave. At 3:34 pm. EST, the casket containing his remains was lowered into the earth, as "Kennedy slipped out of mortal sight—out of sight but not out of heart and mind." Kennedy was buried at Arlington exactly two weeks to the day after he last visited there, when he came for Veterans Day observances.

== Gallery ==
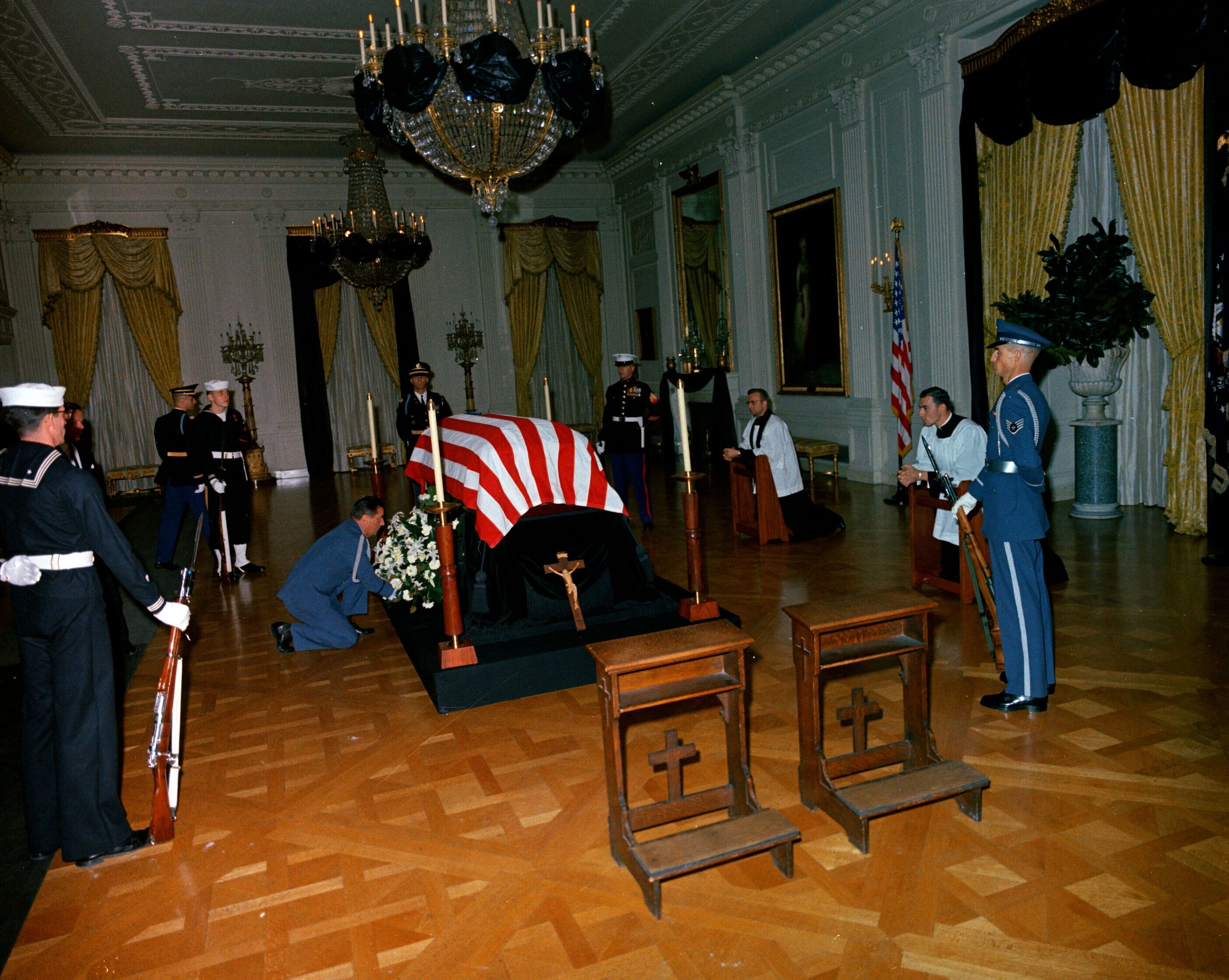
The remains of John F. Kennedy lying in repose in the East Room of the White House on November 23, 1963.

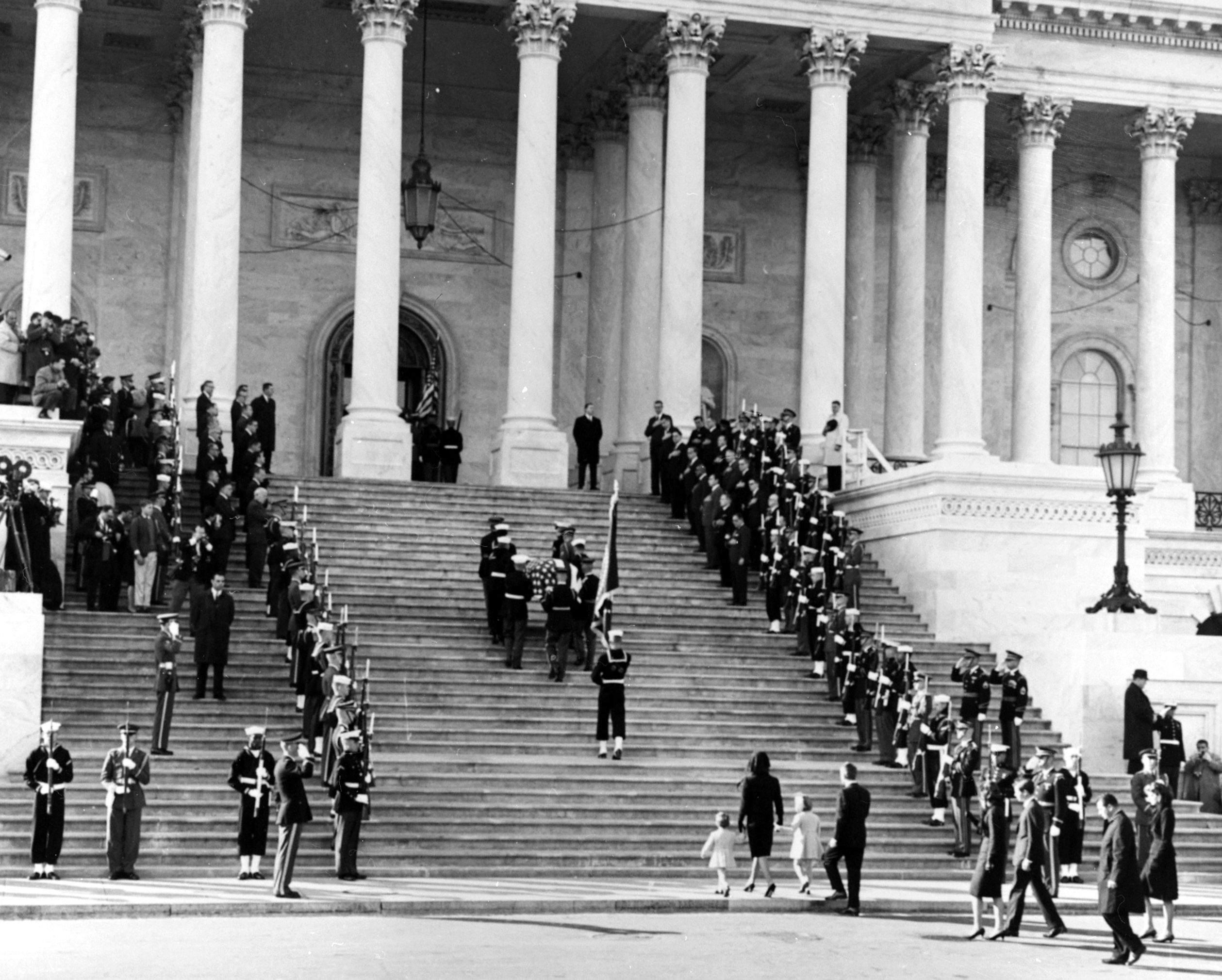
Pall bearers carrying the casket of President Kennedy up the center steps of the United States Capitol Building, followed by a color guard holding the flag of the president of the United States, and the late President's widow, Jacqueline Kennedy and her children, Caroline Kennedy and John F. Kennedy Jr., on November 24, 1963.

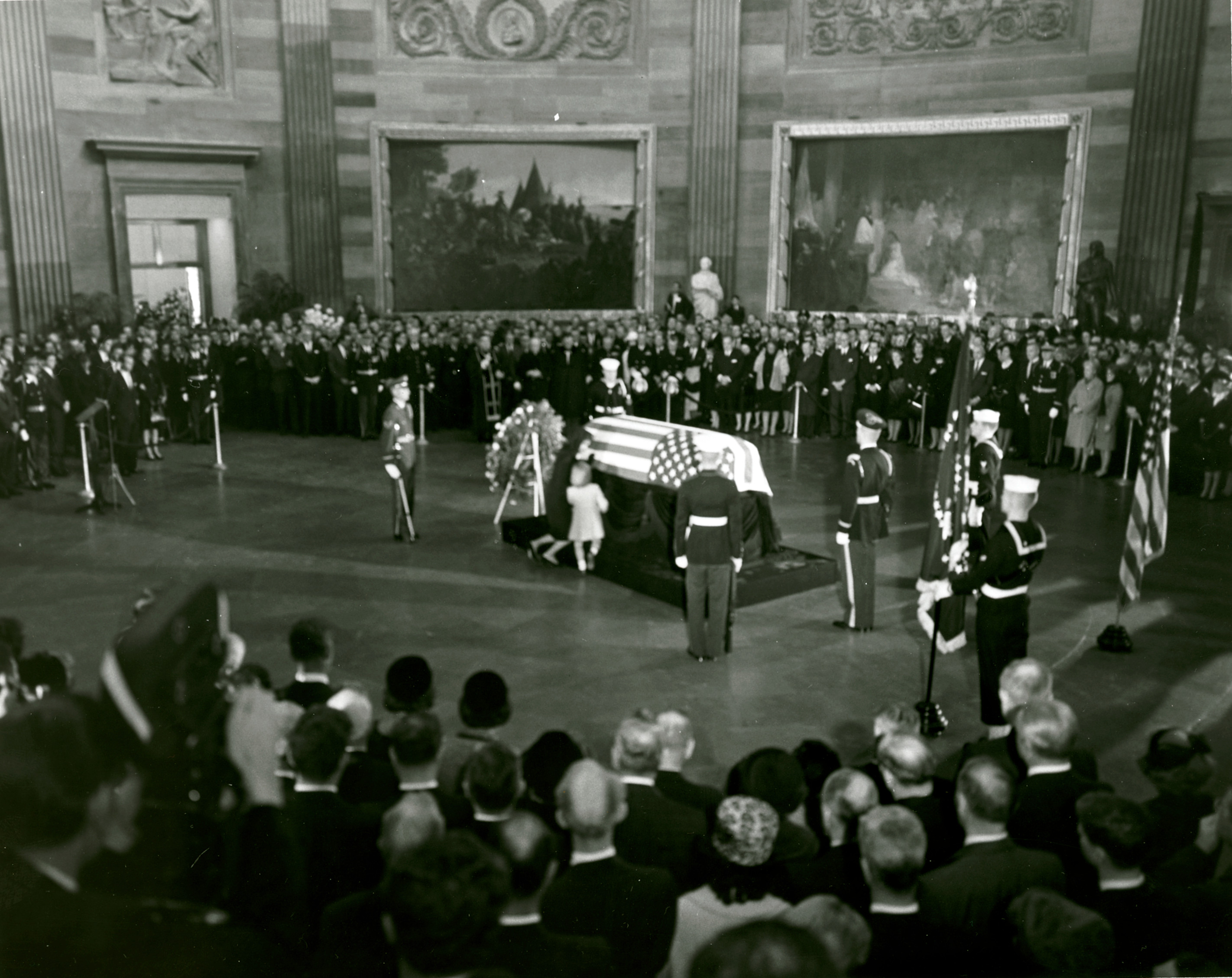
The remains of President Kennedy lying in state in the United States Capitol rotunda on November 24, 1963.

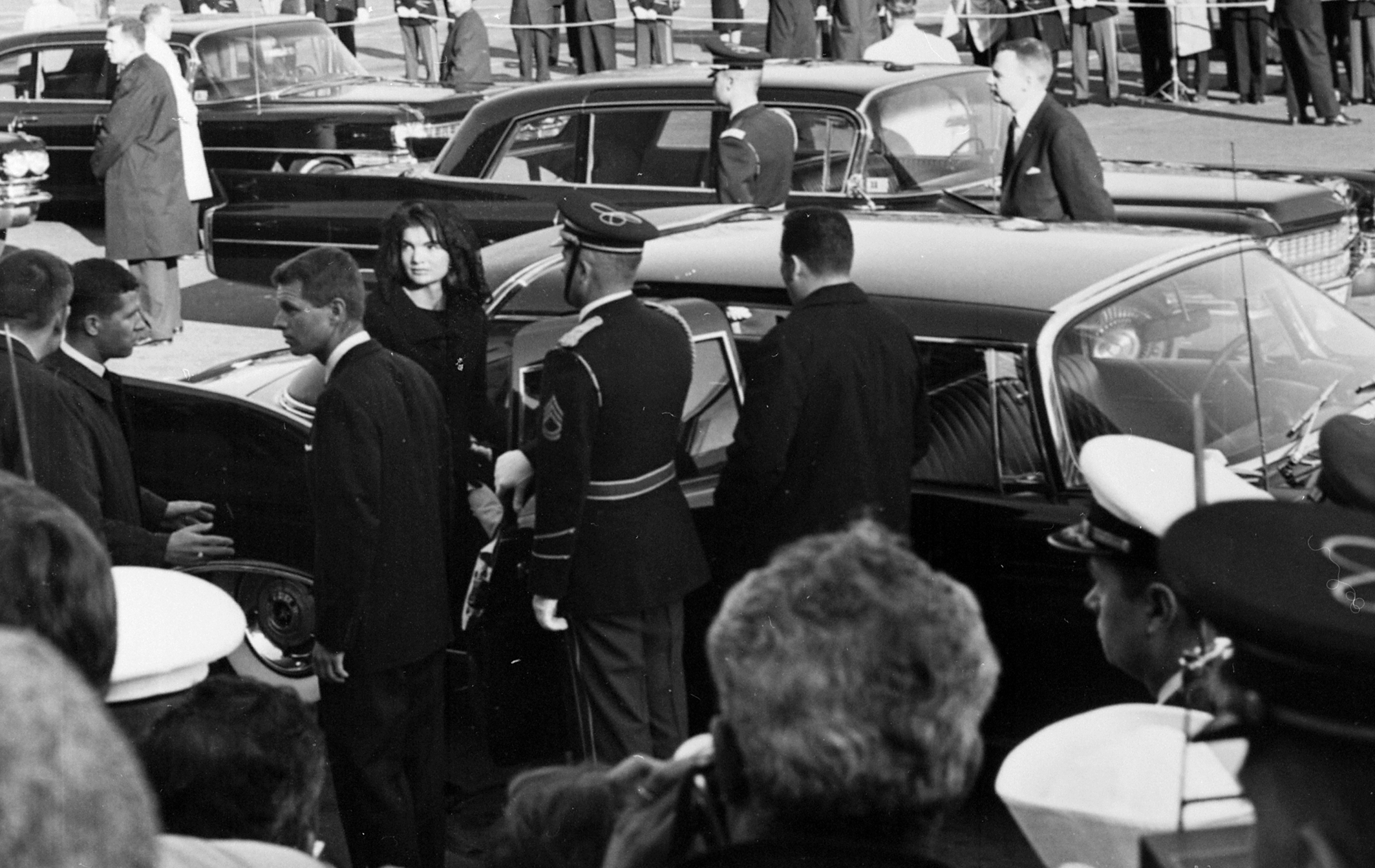
Jacqueline Kennedy and Robert F. Kennedy about to enter a limousine on November 24, 1963.

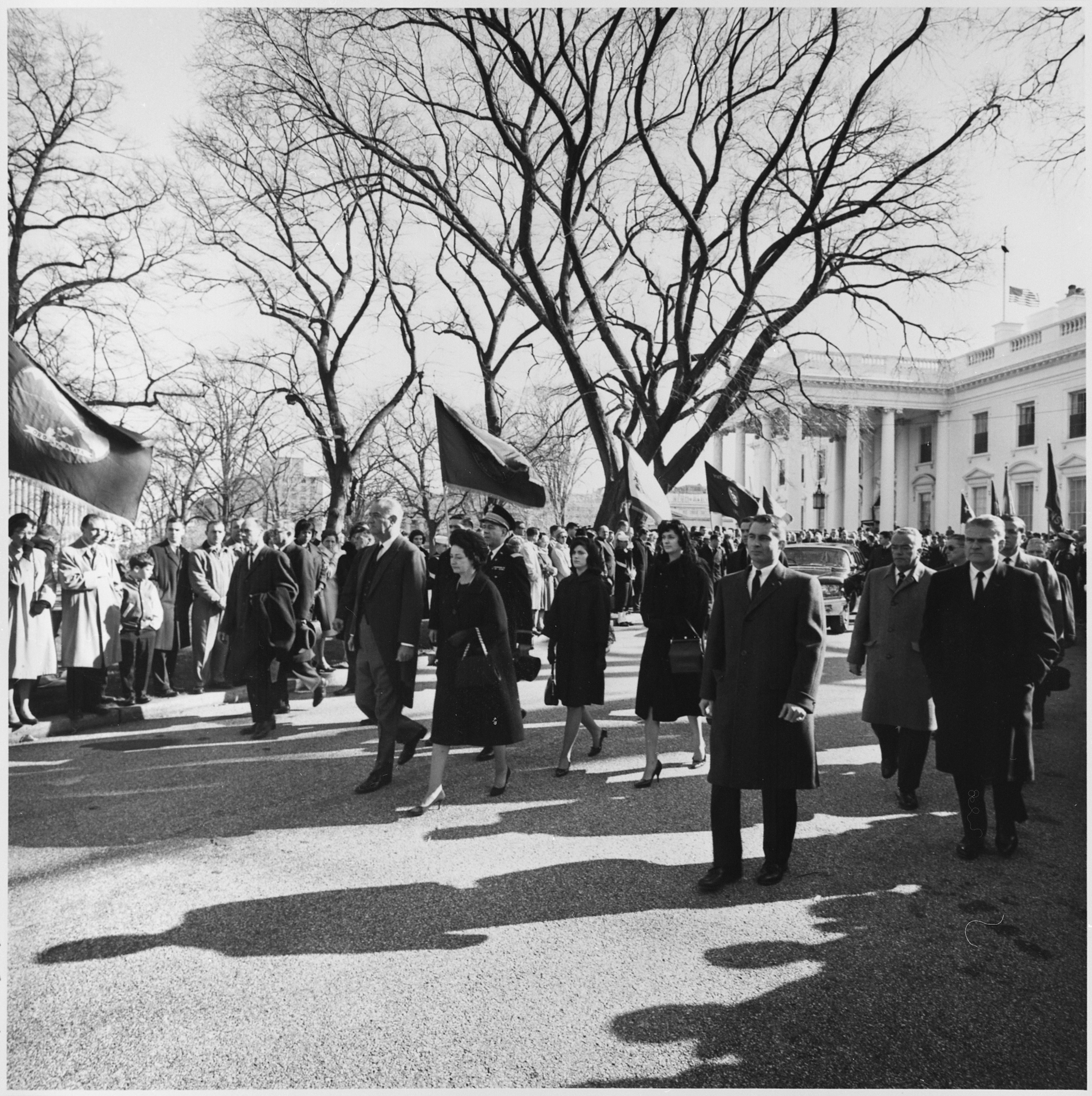
President Lyndon B. Johnson, Lady Bird Johnson, and the Johnson family walking from the White House as part of the funeral procession accompanying President Kennedy's casket to Cathedral of St. Matthew the Apostle on November 25, 1963.

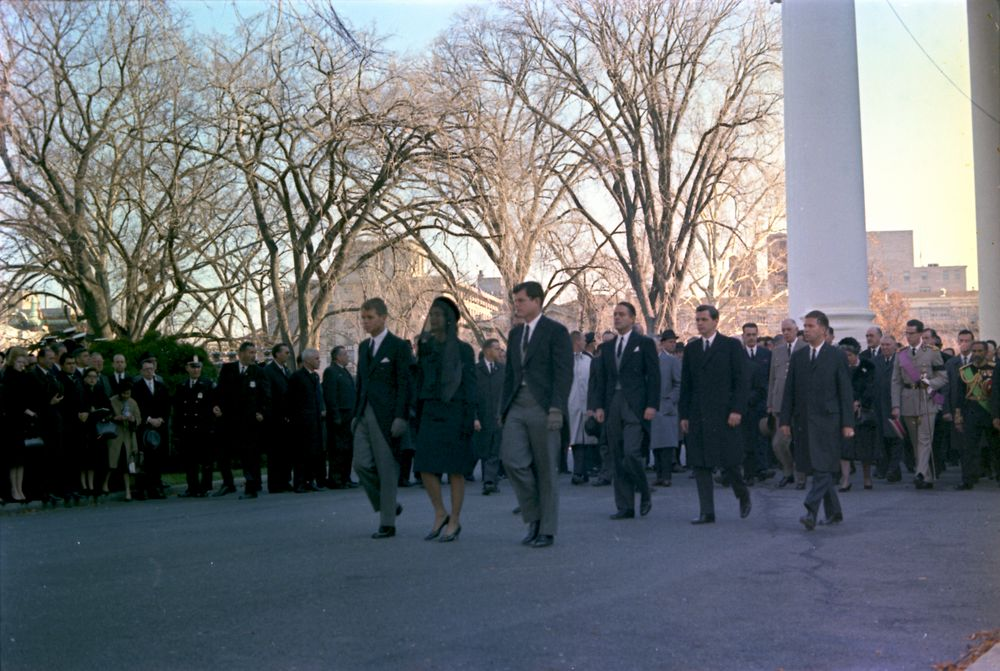
Jacqueline Kennedy, accompanied by her brothers-in-law, Attorney General Robert F. Kennedy and Senator Edward Kennedy, walking from the White House as part of the funeral procession accompanying President Kennedy's casket to Cathedral of St. Matthew the Apostle in Washington D.C. on November 25, 1963.

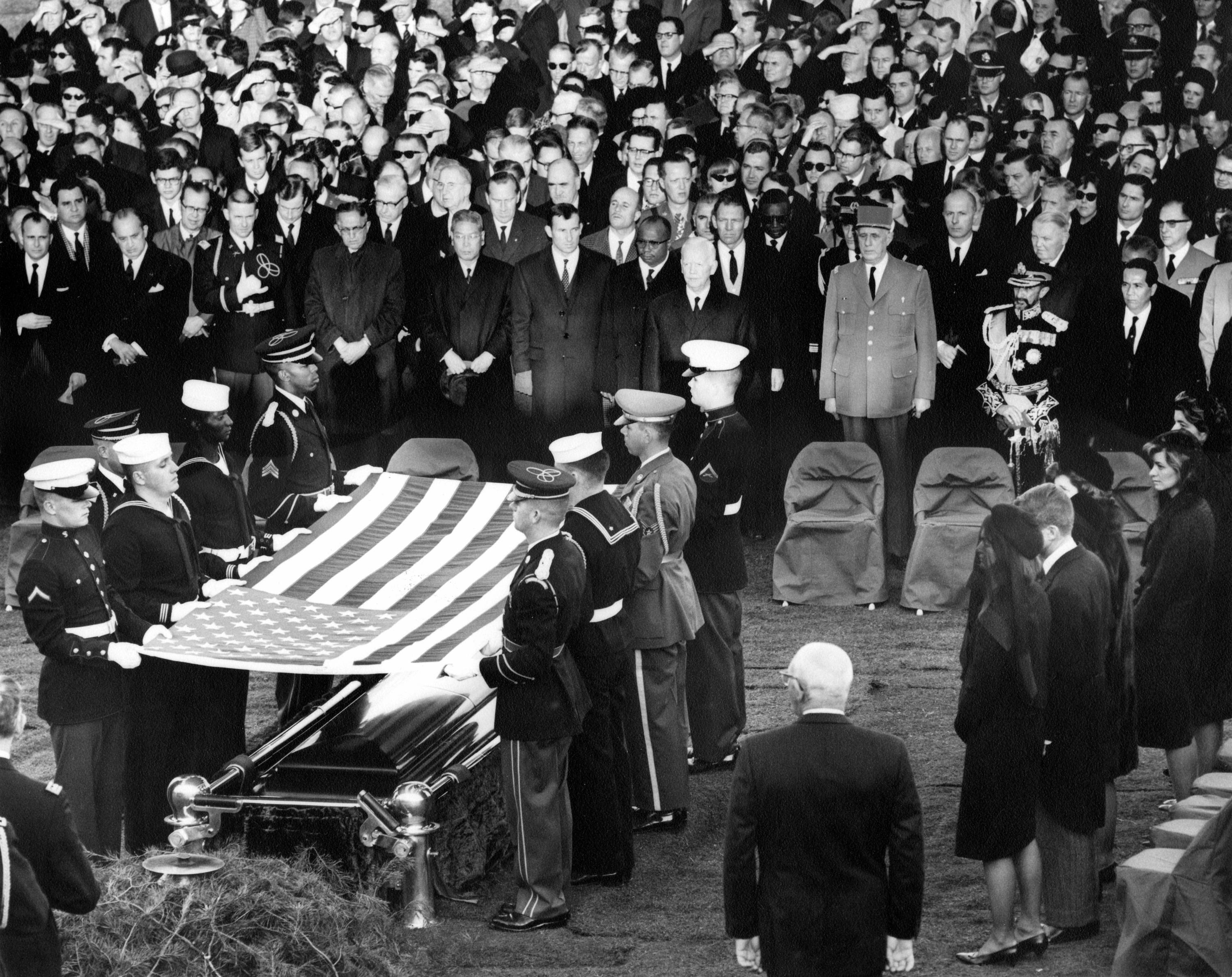
An honor guard folds the flag of the United States at Arlington National Cemetery in preparation for flag presentation to Jacqueline Kennedy on November 25, 1963.

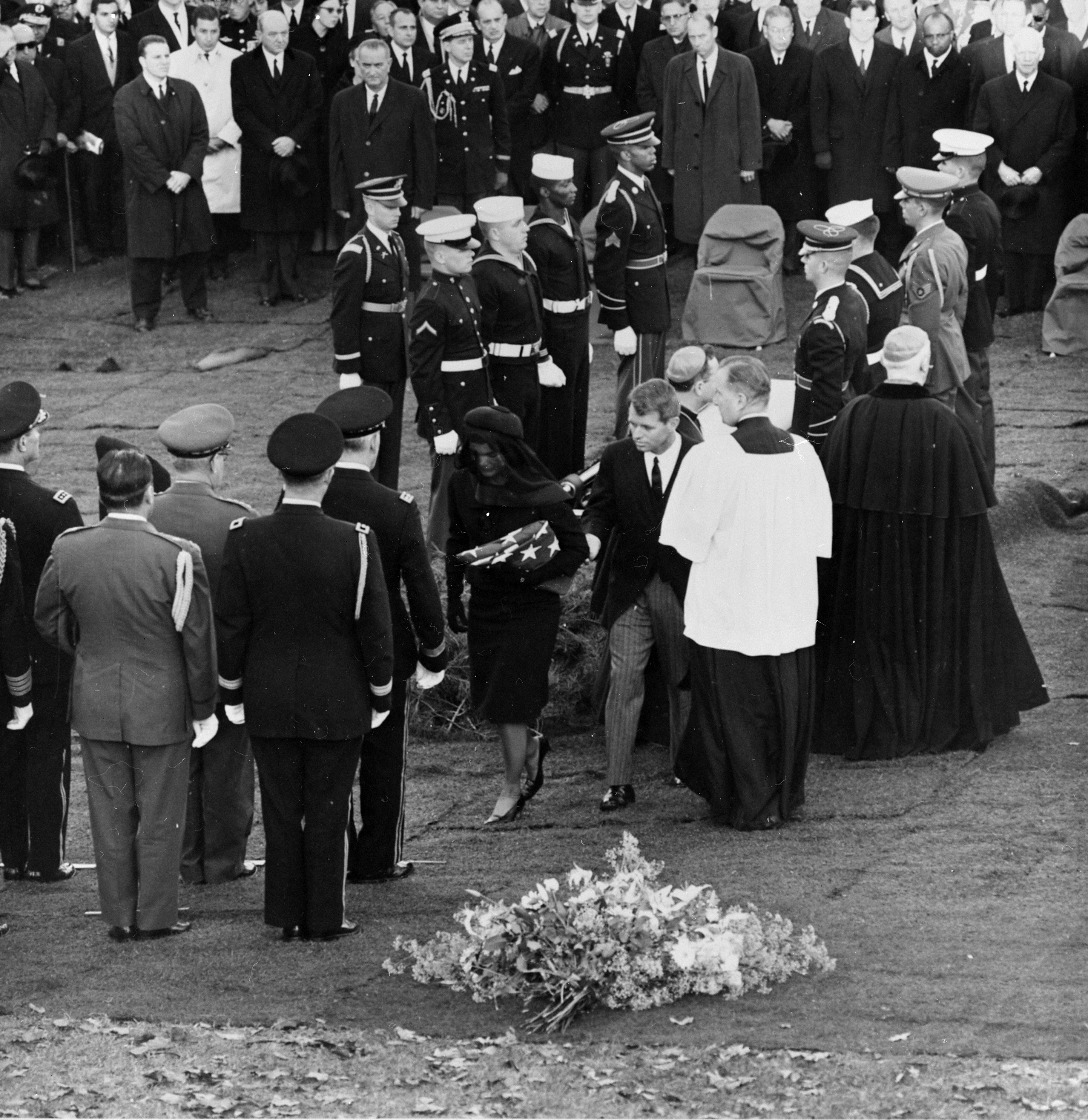
Jacqueline Kennedy and Attorney General Robert F. Kennedy walk away from President Kennedy's casket during interment at Arlington National Cemetery on November 25, 1963.

== Dignitaries ==
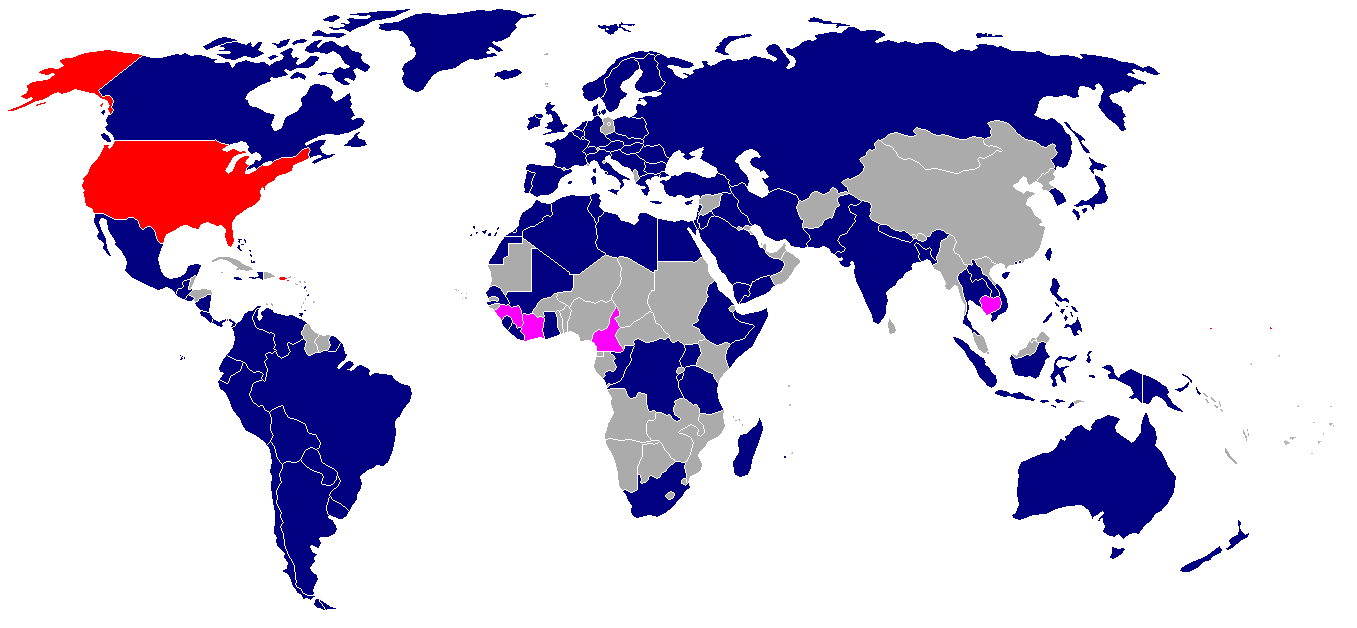
Nations that attended the funeral (blue) or whose dignitaries arrived too late (pink), but attended President Lyndon B. Johnson's reception on November 25.

As President Kennedy lay in state, foreign dignitaries—including heads of state and government and members of royal families—started to arrive in Washington to attend the state funeral on Monday. Secretary of State Dean Rusk and other State Department personnel went to both of Washington's commercial airports to personally greet foreign dignitaries.

With so many foreign dignitaries attending the funeral, some law enforcement officials, including MPDC Chief Robert V. Murray, later said that it was the biggest security nightmare they ever faced.

Not since the funeral of Britain's King Edward VII, in 1910, had there been such a large gathering of presidents, prime ministers, and royalty at a state funeral. In all, 220 foreign dignitaries from 92 countries, five international agencies, and the papacy attended the funeral. The dignitaries included 19 heads of state and government and members of royal families. This was the largest gathering of foreign statesmen in the history of the United States.

Among the dignitaries that attended the funeral were French President Charles de Gaulle, Belgian King Baudouin, Ethiopian Emperor Haile Selassie, Irish President Éamon de Valera, Philippine President Diosdado Macapagal, and West German President Heinrich Lübke. The Soviet Union was represented by First Deputy Premier Anastas Mikoyan.

=== Post-funeral receptions ===
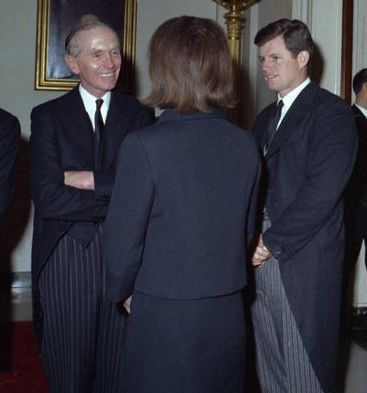
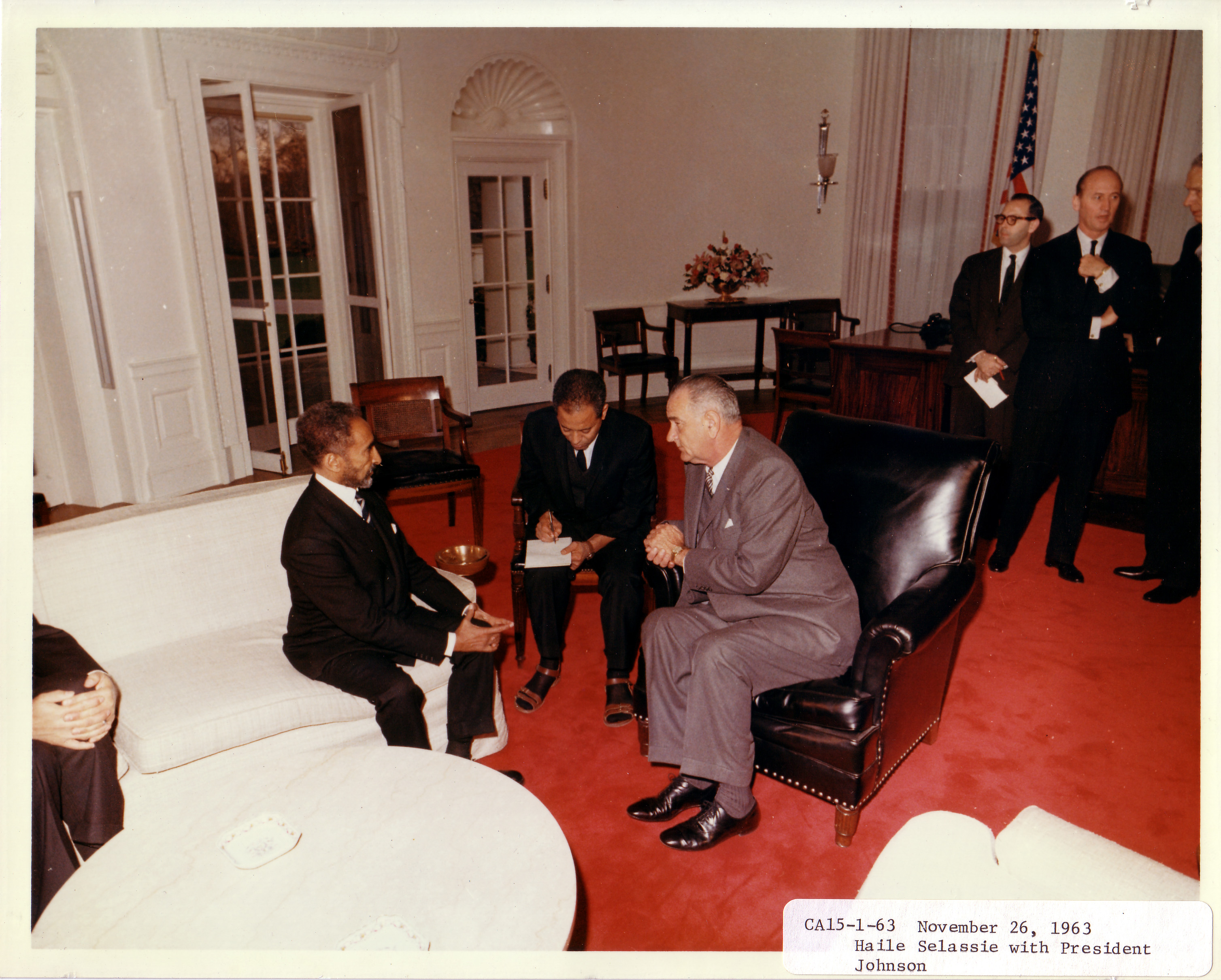
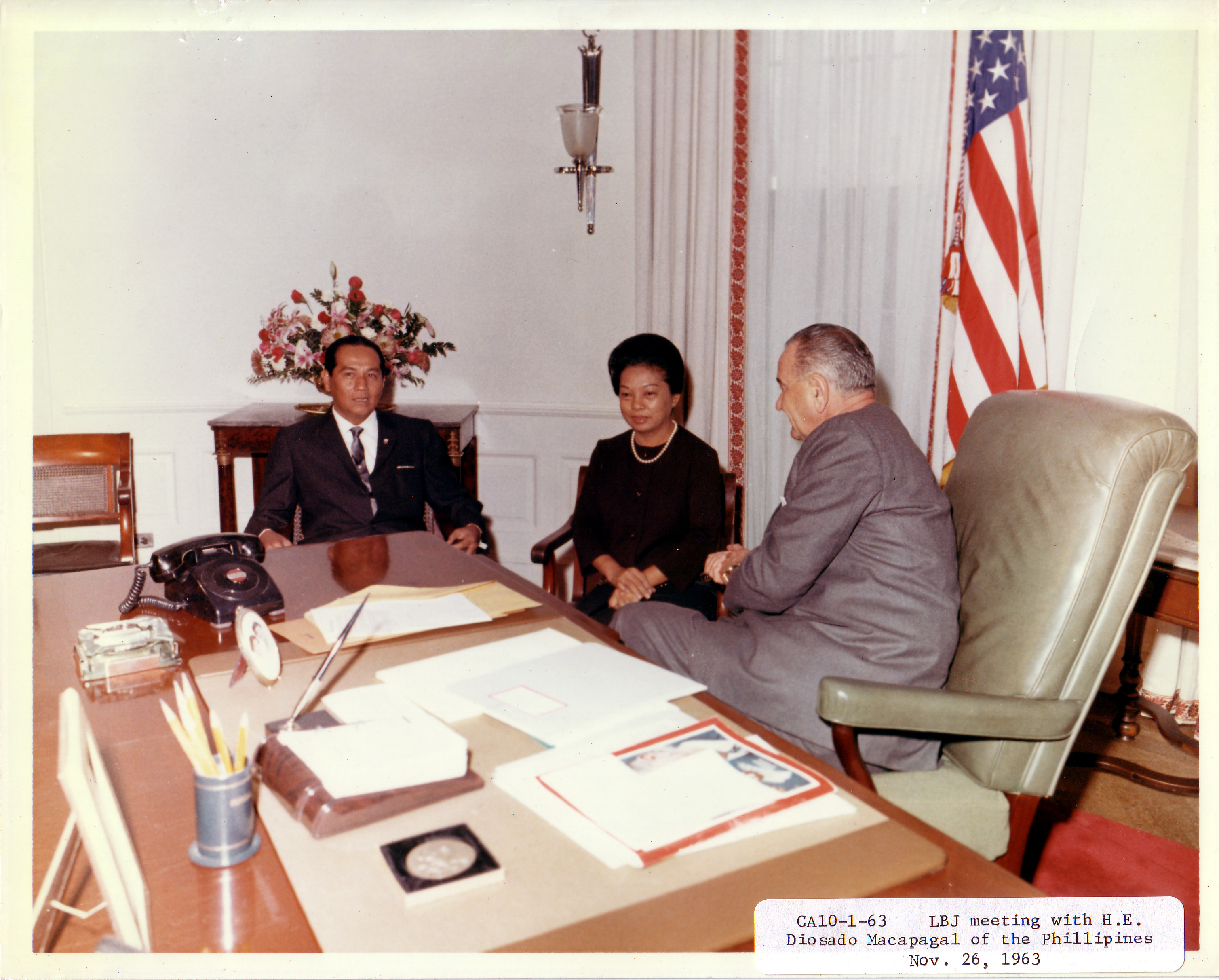
World leaders at receptions and meetings at the White House following the funeral of JFK. On left, British Prime Minister Sir Alec Douglas-Home meeting with Jacqueline Kennedy and Senator Ted Kennedy after the funeral. Ethiopian Emperor Haile Selassie I (middle) and President Diosdado Macapagal of the Philippines (right) with the new president on his first day in the Oval Office.

After the funeral, the foreign dignitaries attended a White House reception to pay their respects to Mrs. Kennedy, followed by a reception at the State Department hosted by Secretary of State Rusk. Johnson first met with Mikoyan, per Cold War protocol, which was for the American and Soviet leaders to meet each other first. He would meet with several world leaders the following day when he moved into the Oval Office of the White House, including Ludwig Erhard and Haile Selassie.

After the reception for foreign dignitaries, Johnson hosted another reception, this one for the governors, followed by a meeting with Treasury Secretary C. Douglas Dillon and other economic advisers to discuss the new budget to be sent to Congress in January.

== In popular culture ==
- The 2016 film, Jackie portrays Jacqueline Kennedy, played by Natalie Portman, as she plans and designs the state funeral.

== See also ==
- Keith Clark, U.S. Army bugler who played "Taps" at Kennedy's funeral
- Foreign military units at the state funeral of John F. Kennedy
- State funerals in the United States
