= Clayton Allen =

American communications expert (1892–1967)

- Born: Clayton T. Allen; May 5, 1892; Addison, New York, U.S.
- Died: February 8, 1967 (aged 74); New York City, U.S.
- Spouse(s): Hazel McMulkin (m. 1916; died 1919) Ora G. Morton (m. 1922)
- Children: 5

Clayton T. Allen (May 5, 1892 – February 8, 1967) was an American communications expert who worked equipping ships during World War II. He continued in this endeavor until 1950. He founded Communications, Inc., of New York City, which was dissolved in 1950.

Allen was born in 1892 in Addison, New York. He later moved to Michigan and ran an insurance business in Grand Rapids, Michigan, for a quarter of a century. His firm was affiliated with AXA Equitable Life Insurance Company and Pacific Life Insurance Company.

During his later years he operated the Vermont Apple Company located on Isle La Motte, an island in Lake Champlain, 14 miles west of St. Albans.

In 1916, he was working as a bookkeeper when he married Hazel McMulkin in Manistique, Michigan. They had a son, Harry, before she died in 1919 in the global flu pandemic, succumbing to influenza while giving birth to a stillborn daughter. In 1922, he married Ora G. Morton in Michigan.

He resided at 67 Riverside Drive in New York City. He died in 1967 at Roosevelt Hospital and was survived by his second wife and their three daughters.
