= Wanda Cochran =

American singer

Wanda Cochran (March 29, 1923 – March 4, 2008) was an American soprano. She was best known for her performances in musicals.

== Biography ==
Born in East Grand Rapids, Michigan, she was the only child of Marshall and Ida Cochran. Cochran won a scholarship to attend the American Conservatory of Music in Chicago and graduated with an M. A. in Music.

Her first role was in the original production of Oklahoma! as an alternate in the lead role of Laurey. She appeared on Broadway in the musical Three Waltzes in 1937–38. She went on to appear in the title role of the musical Irene, touring in Europe, and, back in New York City in 1947–48, she appeared in the original production of Brigadoon. She then returned to Michigan, where she had her own radio shows.

=== Family ===
She married Robert H. Rose and moved to Europe in 1948. The couple produced a son, Harrison Rose (who predeceased his mother) and a daughter, Miarka (Rose) Mazur.

=== European career ===
She appeared at nightclubs and cabarets in Paris. She became a regular soloist with the Metropole Orchestra in the Netherlands. She also broadcast for the Voice of America. Cochran then moved to England and performed in many concerts, recitals and oratorios. She returned to New York City in 1968.

=== Death ===
She died on Tuesday March 4, 2008, at age 84. She was survived by her daughter Miarka, her granddaughter Amanda Mazur and her ex-husband, Robert Rose. She was predeceased by her son, Harrison deKoning Rose, in 1996.
