= Pennjamin Bannekar =

American rapper

- Born: Damion Hudson; January 11, 1984 (age 42); Grand Rapids, Michigan, United States
- Origin: Chicago, Illinois
- Genres: Hip Hop, Soul
- Occupations: Rapper, Songwriter, Performer
- Label: ILLwrite Music Group
- Website: www.pennandpencil.com

Damion Hudson (born January 11, 1984), better known by his stage name Pennjamin Bannekar is an American independent music artist and songwriter.

== Music career ==
Pennjamin Bannekar was born in Grand Rapids, Michigan but raised in Chicago, Penn as he is often called, discovered his love for music at an early age. Falling in love with the creative process and writing Penn decided to major in Communications and graduated from University of Illinois Champaign Urbana. College was where Penn began to grow as an artist and started to receive acclaim. Penn came back to Chicago and joined the group Project: Fr3sh. While in Project: Fr3sh Penn changed his name from Penn the God to Pennjamin Bannekar. Given the name by his friends as a joke, he began to love the meaning behind it and chose to use it as his stage name. After a 2-year run with the group Penn went solo and began to become the unsung hype of Chicago’s hip hop scene. His first solo project was his mixtape Hello World. The release of Hello World had many people clamoring for more The success of Hello World set up the release of his first album HeartBeat. HeartBeat was released May 3, 2011. The first single from HeartBeat was ILLwrite. The single was a great introduction of who he was and was picked up by MTV HeartBeat went on to Be named Album Of The Month by some critics after landing write ups in the Chicago Tribune and touring with Dwele Elzhi Bilal Oliver KRS-One<Penn’s success started to materialize.

== Discography ==
=== Singles ===
- 2016: Maybe featuring Tooty
- 2016: Bodies featuring Dhniera Blu
- 2016: Congratulations
- 2015: Light It Up
- 2015: Likes
- 2015: Thief featuring Felly the Voice
- 2015: Word
- 2014: ArtOfficial
- 2014: Never Go Against B
- 2013: ILLwrite Too
- 2013: Same Ol Love Song
- 2011: Counterfeit
- 2011: ILLwrite
- 2010: Set It Off
- 2009: Hello World
- 2009: Love As Completion

=== Albums ===
- 2018: 1/11
- 2015: Paper Plane Pilots
- 2011: HeartBeat
