= Noah Sife =

American actor

- "Noah Sife in Hollywood"
- Born: Noah Abdul-Adil Seifullah II; October 19, 1984 (age 41); Grand Rapids, Michigan, U.S.
- Years active: 1999 – present
- Spouse: Naomi Seifullah

Noah Sife is an American actor based Los Angeles, California. His television credits include The Shield, and a brief Improv Show on MTV starring Andy Dick. He is also the star of the internet show entitled The Adventures of Noah Sife, His YouTube videos have attracted a sum of over 1,000,000 views. He has released a DVD titled The Adventures of Noah Sife V. 1 and is currently working on the feature film The Adventures of Noah Sife V. 2 . Noah is also a writer and has written the "Adventures of Noah Sife" series so far. He is also the creator of AONS (Adventures of Noah Sife) Productions, which is an up-and-coming production company. He is currently working on more videos for the series.
