= Sam Stryke =

- Born: 1970-12-23; Grand Rapids, Michigan, United States
- Genres: Adult contemporary
- Occupations: Composer, recording artist
- Instrument: Piano
- Website: www.samstryke.com

Sam Stryke is the artist name of Sam Struyk (pronounced Sam Strike). Stryke is an American composer and contemporary pianist whose self-produced first album, In the Wind led him to be signed by Atlantic Records in 1991. Stryke has independently released the instrumental album Emerging in 2002 and his popular CD, Christmas, which includes adaptations of classic Christmas carols, along with several original compositions in 2006. Stryke released his fourth album, a pop jazz CD entitled Brunch, in April 2010. Also in 2010 Stryke released his second Christmas CD, Joy to the World featuring piano and orchestra arrangements of traditional carols.

Stryke and Scandal Music owner Sandy Torano are responsible for composing the music for the award-winning Real Men of Genius campaign, along with numerous other well-known ad campaigns, including Bud Light, Nintendo, McDonald’s, Capital One, State Farm and many more. Stryke has also composed music for independent films and TV including The Oprah Winfrey Show, the Oprah and Friends XM Satellite radio show, and Oprah Winfrey’s “Leadership Academy” prime time TV special devoted to her school in South Africa.

A native of Grand Rapids, Michigan, Stryke moved to Chicago, where he earned a bachelor's degree in music from Northwestern University in 1993. He has studied with jazz pianist Michael Kocour, noted composer and arranger Cliff Colnot, and New York-based jazz pianist Jim McNeely through a National Endowment for the Arts grant in 1994. Stryke has performed as a guest pianist with the Grand Rapids Symphony and the Atlanta Symphony. He also participates in art projects in Grand Rapids.

== Discography ==
- 1991 - In the Wind
- 2002 - Emerging
- 2006 - Christmas
- 2010 - Brunch
