= Edmund Burfoot =

American politician (1858–1938)

Member of the Michigan House of Representatives
- In office January 4, 1899 – 1900

Personal details
- Born: May 4, 1858 England, UK
- Died: February 17, 1938 (aged 79) Richwoods Township, Peoria County, Illinois, US
- Party: Republican
- Children: 3

Edmund Burfoot (May 4, 1858 – February 17, 1938) was an English-born American politician who served as a Republican member of the Michigan House of Representatives.

== Biography ==
Burfoot was born in England, on May 4, 1858, to George and Jane Burfoot. He was separated from his parents and immigrated to Canada in 1867, and he worked as a wood carver. On December 24, 1880, he married Eva Ann Totterdell in Ontario, having three children with her. In 1887, they settled in Grand Rapids, Michigan. There, he studied law and was admitted to the State Bar of Michigan in 1895. On November 8, 1898, he was elected member of the Michigan House of Representatives, being sworn in on January 4, 1899, and serving until 1900.

By 1920, he was a minister in Illinois, dying on February 17, 1938, in Richwoods Township, Peoria County, aged 79. He was buried on February 21, in Oak Hill Cemetery, in Grand Rapids.
