= Keith Clark (bugler) =

United States Army bugler

Keith Collar Clark
- Born: November 21, 1927; Grand Rapids, Michigan, US
- Died: January 11, 2002 (aged 74) Fort Pierce, Florida, US
- Occupations: Musician, United States Army Band
- Instrument: Bugle
- Resting place: Arlington National Cemetery; Arlington, Virginia, US; 38°52′17.6″N 77°04′11.8″W
- Spouse(s): Marjorie (née Park), wife
- Children: Beth Barnard; Sandra Masse; Nancy McColley; Karen Moore
- Military career
- Allegiance: United States
- Branch: United States Army
- Service years: 1945–1966
- Rank: Specialist 7 (U.S. Army)
- Conflicts: World War II; Korean War; Vietnam War

Keith Collar Clark (November 21, 1927 – January 11, 2002) was a bugler in the United States Army who played the call "Taps" at the funeral of President John F. Kennedy in 1963. He misplayed the sixth note, and to many this mistake was a poignant symbol of the American nation in mourning. The bugle that Clark used is on display at the welcome center of Arlington National Cemetery.

== Career ==
As lead bugler of the United States Army Band when Kennedy was assassinated, Clark was assigned the task of playing Taps at the president's funeral. On the day of the funeral, Clark stood in the rain for three hours before it was time for him to play. At 3:08 pm, after the 21-gun salute, Clark started to play "Taps", and on the sixth note, briefly sounded the harmonic one higher than intended, "cracking" the note.

After the funeral, many assumed the mistake was intentional.
