= List of diplomatic visits to the United States from Asia =

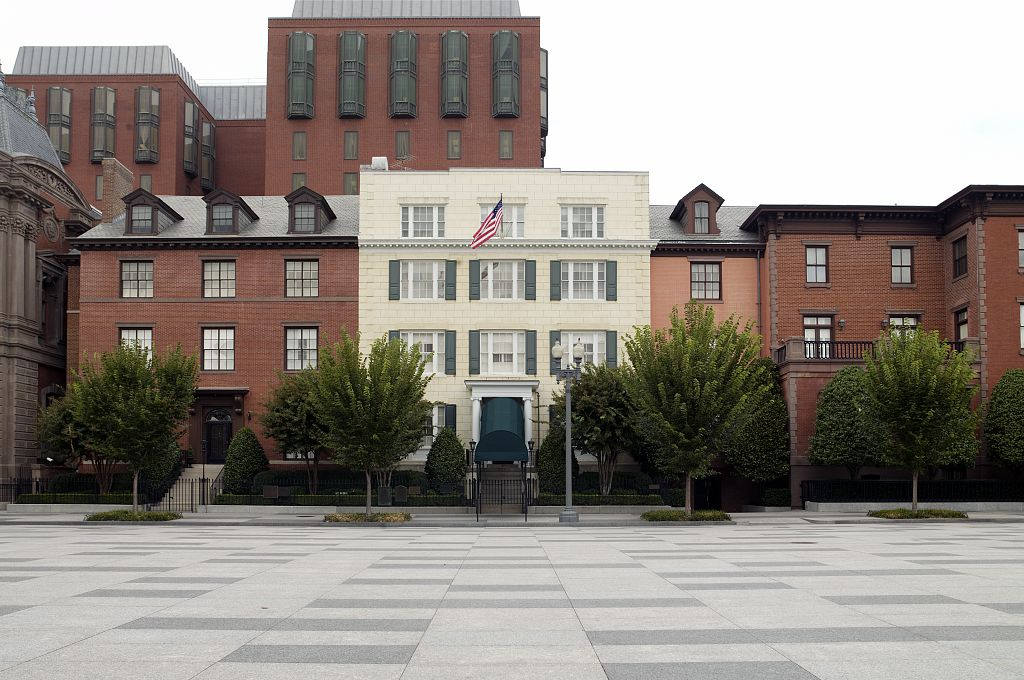
The President's Guest House, commonly known as Blair House has been the official guest house of visiting dignitaries in Washington, D.C. since 1824

International trips made by the heads of state and heads of government to the United States have become a valuable part of American diplomacy and international relations since such trips were first made in the mid-19th century. They are complicated undertakings that often require months of planning along with a great deal of coordination and communication.

The first international visit to the United States was made by King Kalakaua of Hawaii in 1874, which was the first visit by a foreign chief of state or head of government.

The first Asian head of state to visit the United States was King Prajadhipok of Siam in 1931.

== Afghanistan ==
Table of Trips
Start	End	Guest	Title	Reason
August 7, 1947	August 9, 1947	Shah Mahmud Khan	Prime Minister	Unofficial visit.
April 20, 1951	April 26, 1951	Mohammed Daud Khan	Prime Minister	Unofficial visit. Had come to Baltimore in February for medical treatment at Johns Hopkins Hospital
June 24, 1958	June 27, 1958	Mohammed Daud Khan	Prime Minister	Official visit; signed a cultural agreement. Visited Detroit, Niagara Falls, Fort Bragg, Knoxville and Oak Ridge, Los Angeles, San Francisco, Laramie and Yellowstone Park, and New York City Left U.S. July 13.
September 5, 1963	September 7, 1963	Mohammed Zahir Shah	King	State visit. In U.S. September 4–16, visited Williamsburg, Cape Canaveral, Fort Bragg, New York City, Cheyenne, San Francisco, Los Angeles, and Lafayette
March 28, 1967	March 30, 1967	Mohammad Hashim Maiwandwal	Prime Minister	Official visit. In U.S. March 25–April 9; visited New York City, Santa Barbara, and Chicago.
January 27, 2002	January 30, 2002	Hamid Karzai	Chairman	Working visit. Arrived in the U.S. January 27. Attended President Bush's State of the Union speech January 29. Addressed the United Nations and visited Ground Zero in New York City on January 30.
September 12, 2002	September 12, 2002	Hamid Karzai	President	Met with President Bush at the UN General Assembly in New York City.
February 25, 2003	February 28, 2003	Hamid Karzai	President	Working visit.
September 23, 2003	September 23, 2003	Hamid Karzai	President	Met with President Bush at the UN General Assembly in New York City
June 9, 2004	June 16, 2004	Hamid Karzai	President	Working visit. Met with President Bush at the G-8 Economic Summit in Sea Island. Attended the funeral of Former President Reagan. Addressed a Joint session of Congress June 15.
September 22, 2004	September 22, 2004	Hamid Karzai	President	Met with President Bush at the UN General Assembly in New York City
May 23, 2005	May 23, 2005	Hamid Karzai	President	Working visit.
September 24, 2006	September 27, 2006	Hamid Karzai	President	Working visit. Also met with Pakistani President Musharraf on September 27.
August 5, 2007	August 6, 2007	Hamid Karzai	President	Working visit. Met with President Bush at Camp David
September 26, 2007	September 26, 2007	Hamid Karzai	President	Met with President Bush at the UN General Assembly in New York City
September 26, 2008	September 26, 2008	Hamid Karzai	President	Working visit.
May 6, 2009	May 6, 2009	Hamid Karzai	President	Working visit.
May 10, 2010	May 13, 2010	Hamid Karzai	President	Working visit.
September 20, 2011	September 20, 2011	Hamid Karzai	President	Met with President Obama at the UN General Assembly in New York City.
May 21, 2012	May 21, 2012	Hamid Karzai	President	Met with President Obama at the NATO Summit meeting in Chicago
January 10, 2013	January 11, 2013	Hamid Karzai	President	Working visit.
March 23, 2015	March 24, 2015	Ashraf Ghani	President	Official Working Visit.
June 25, 2021	June 25, 2021	Ashraf Ghani	President	Working visit.

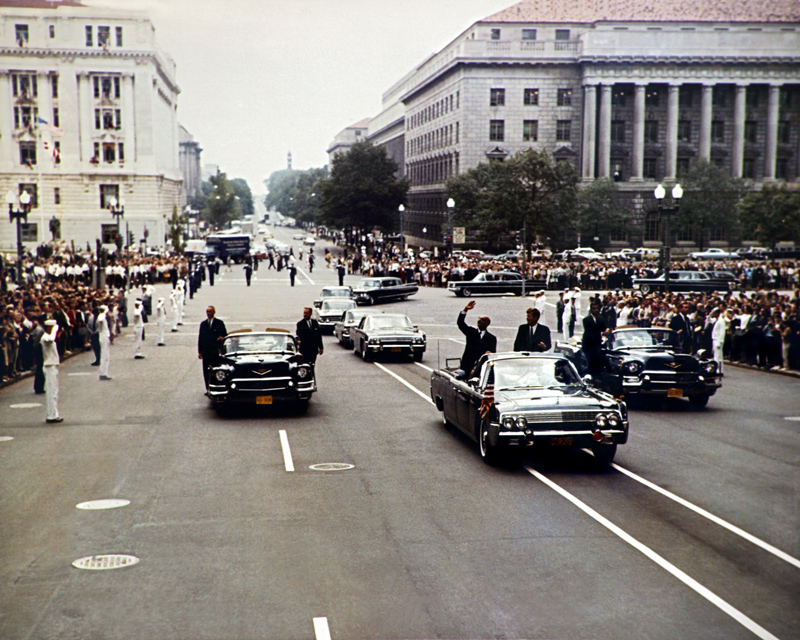

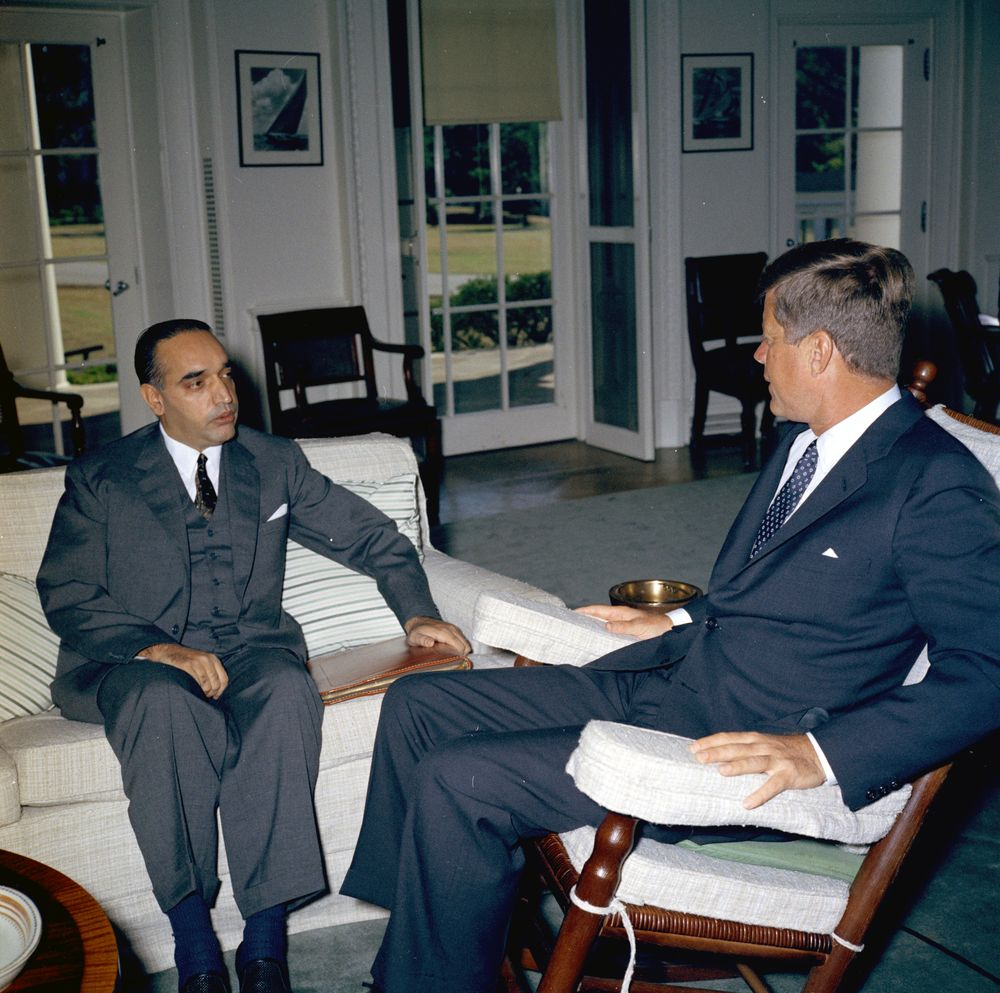

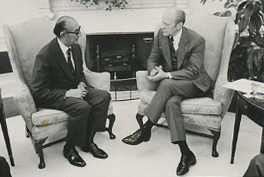

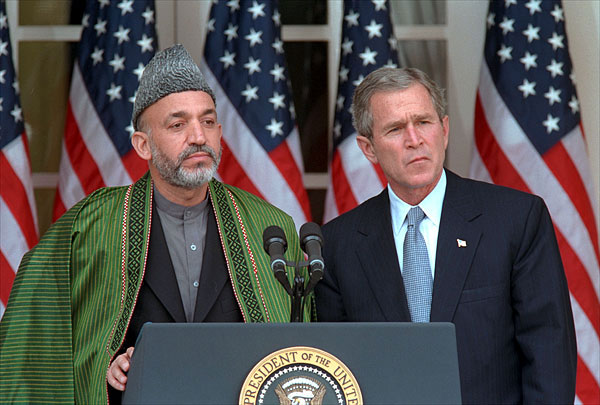

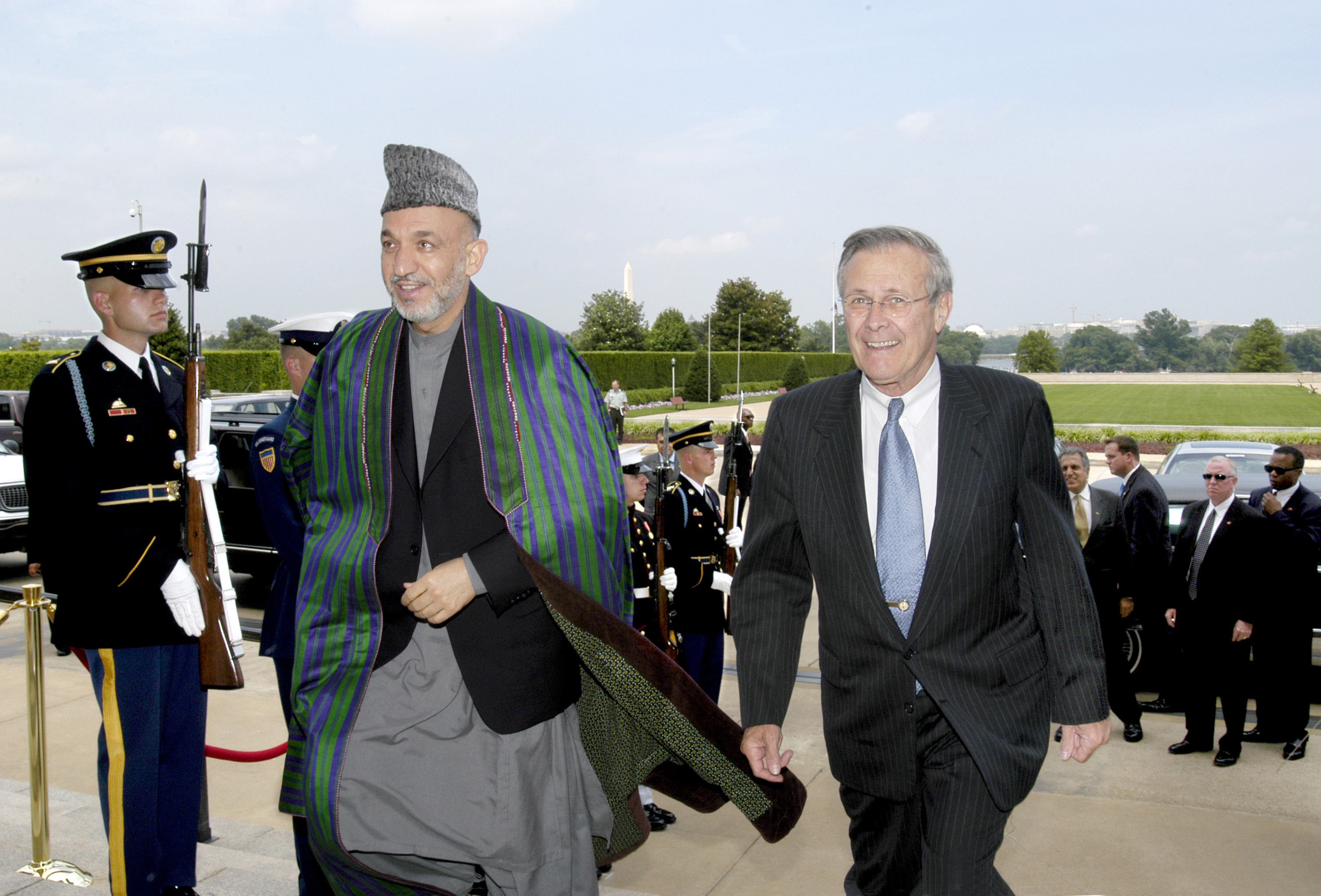

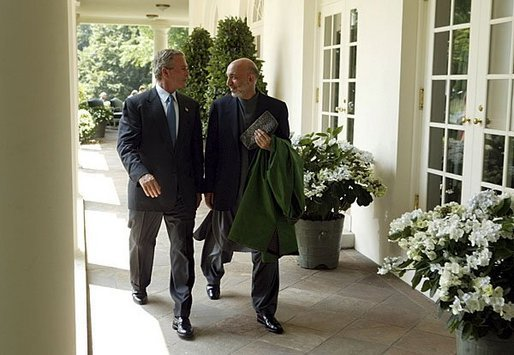

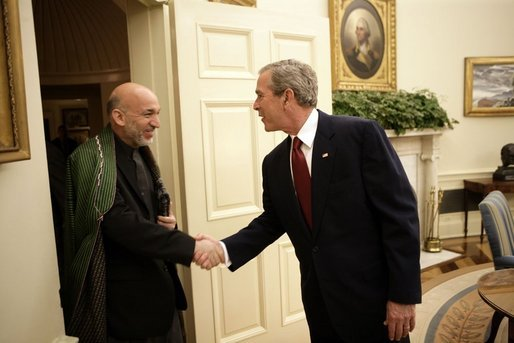

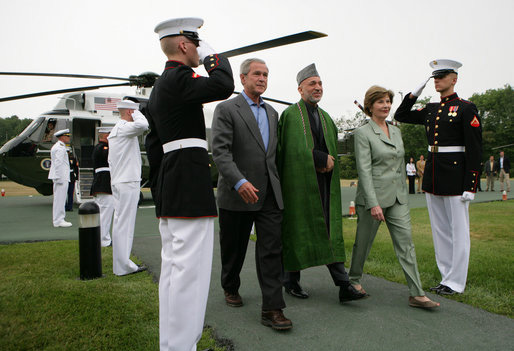

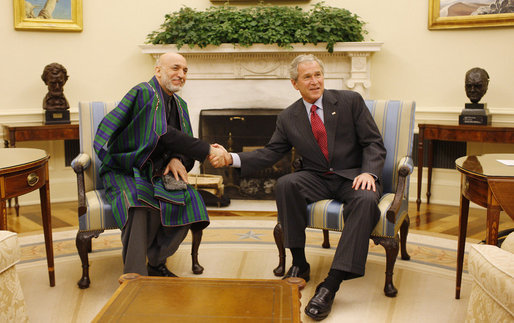

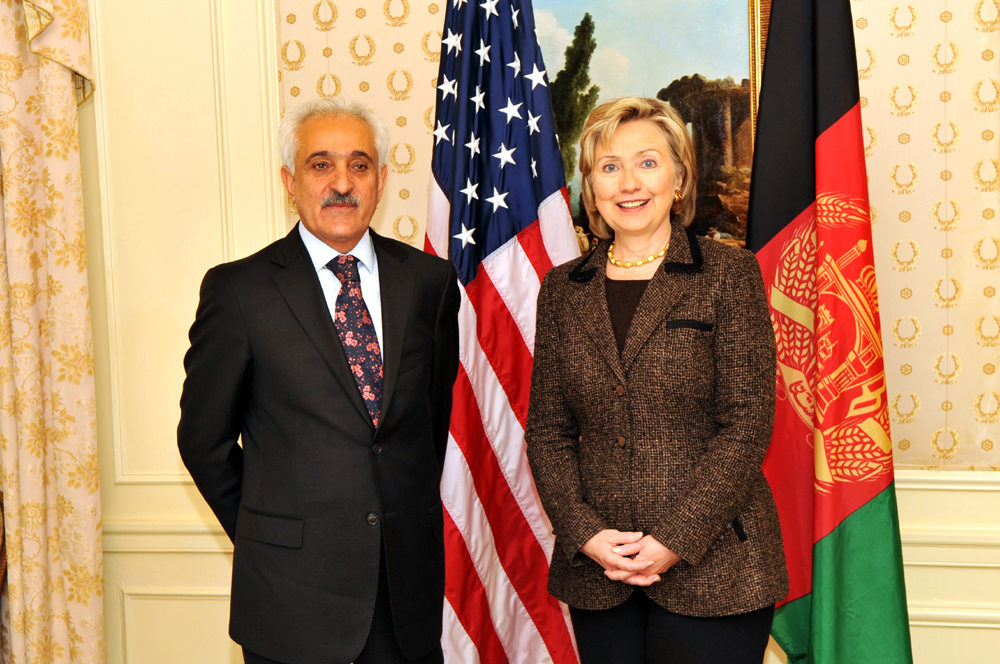

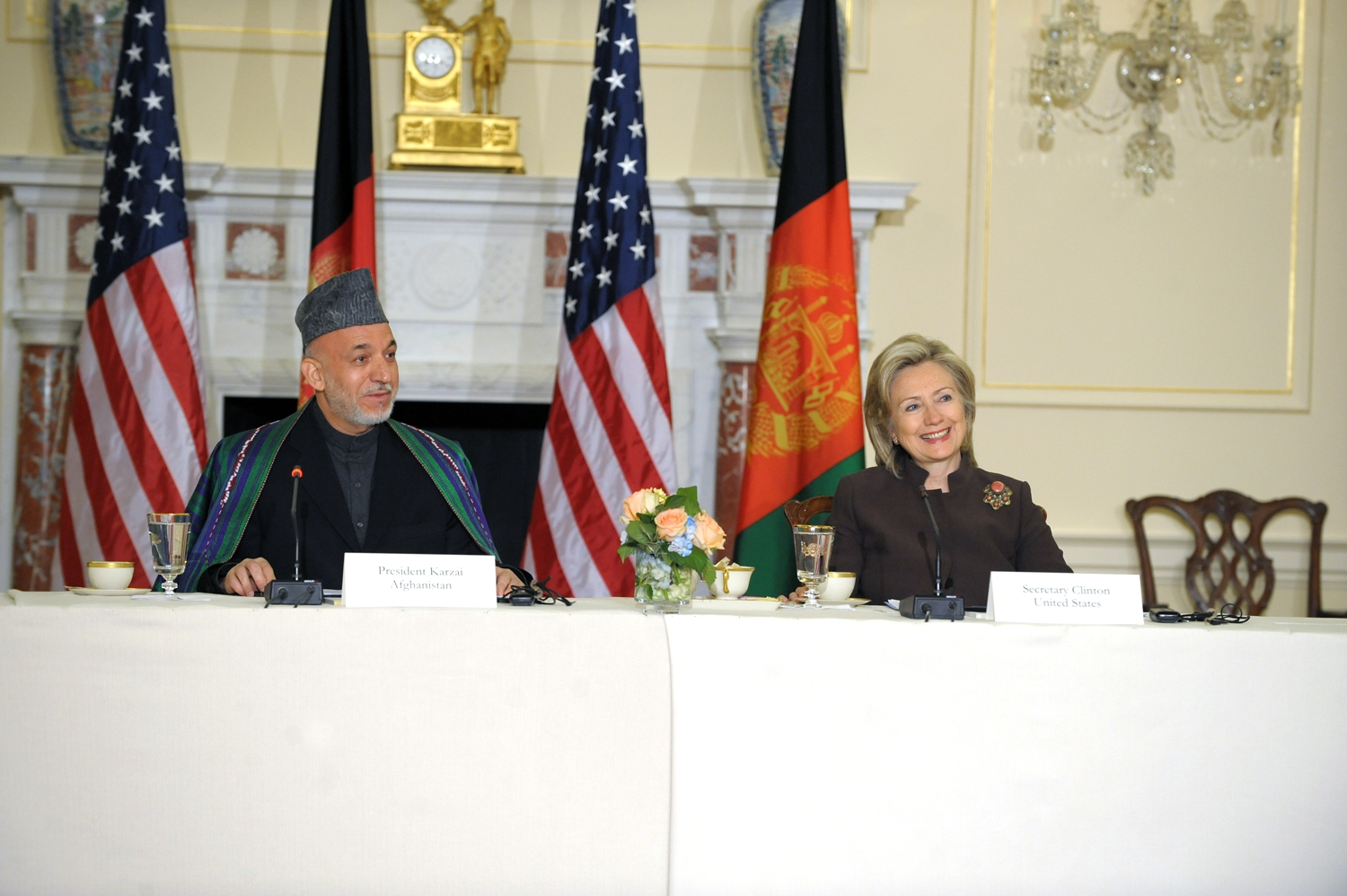

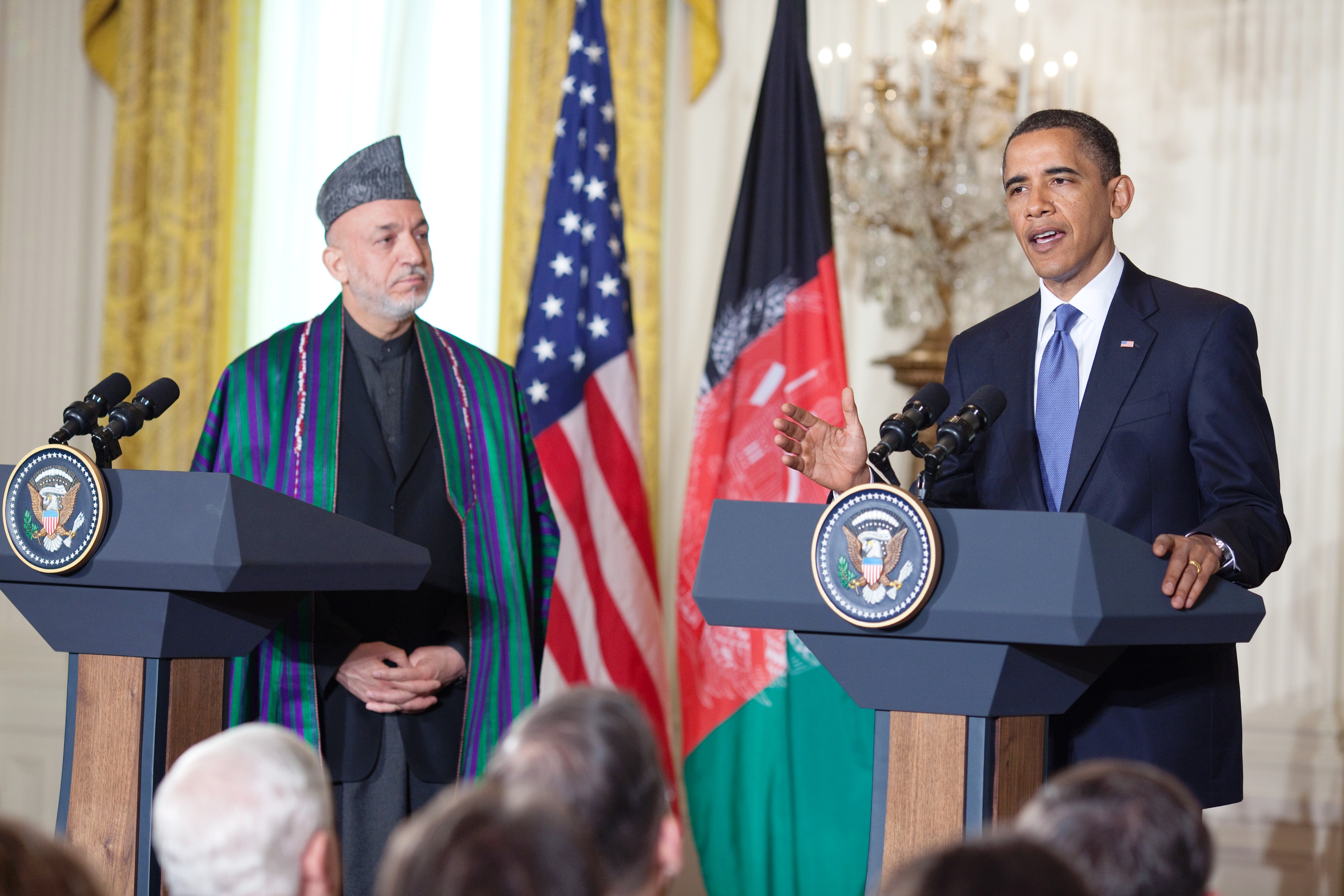

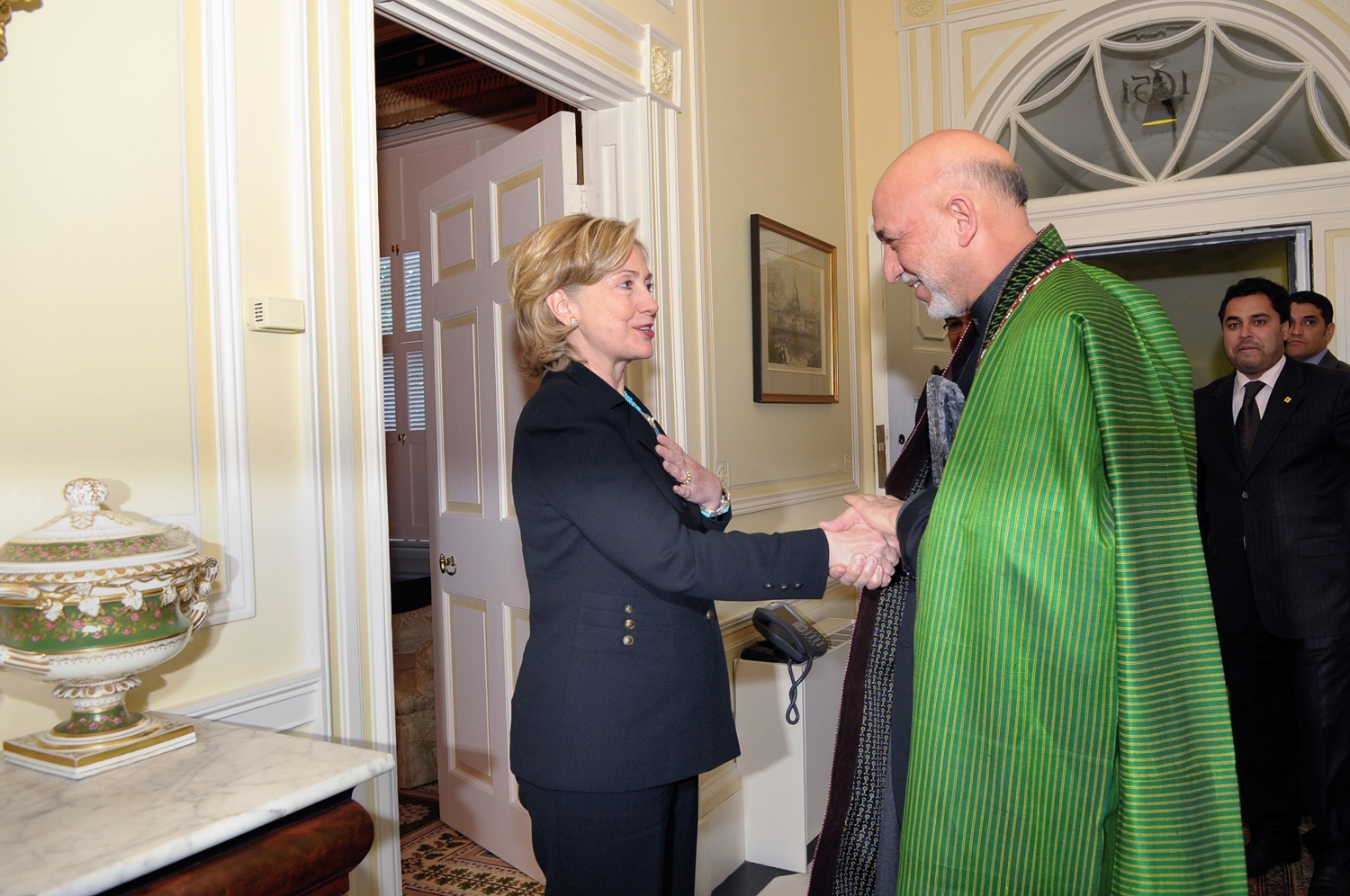

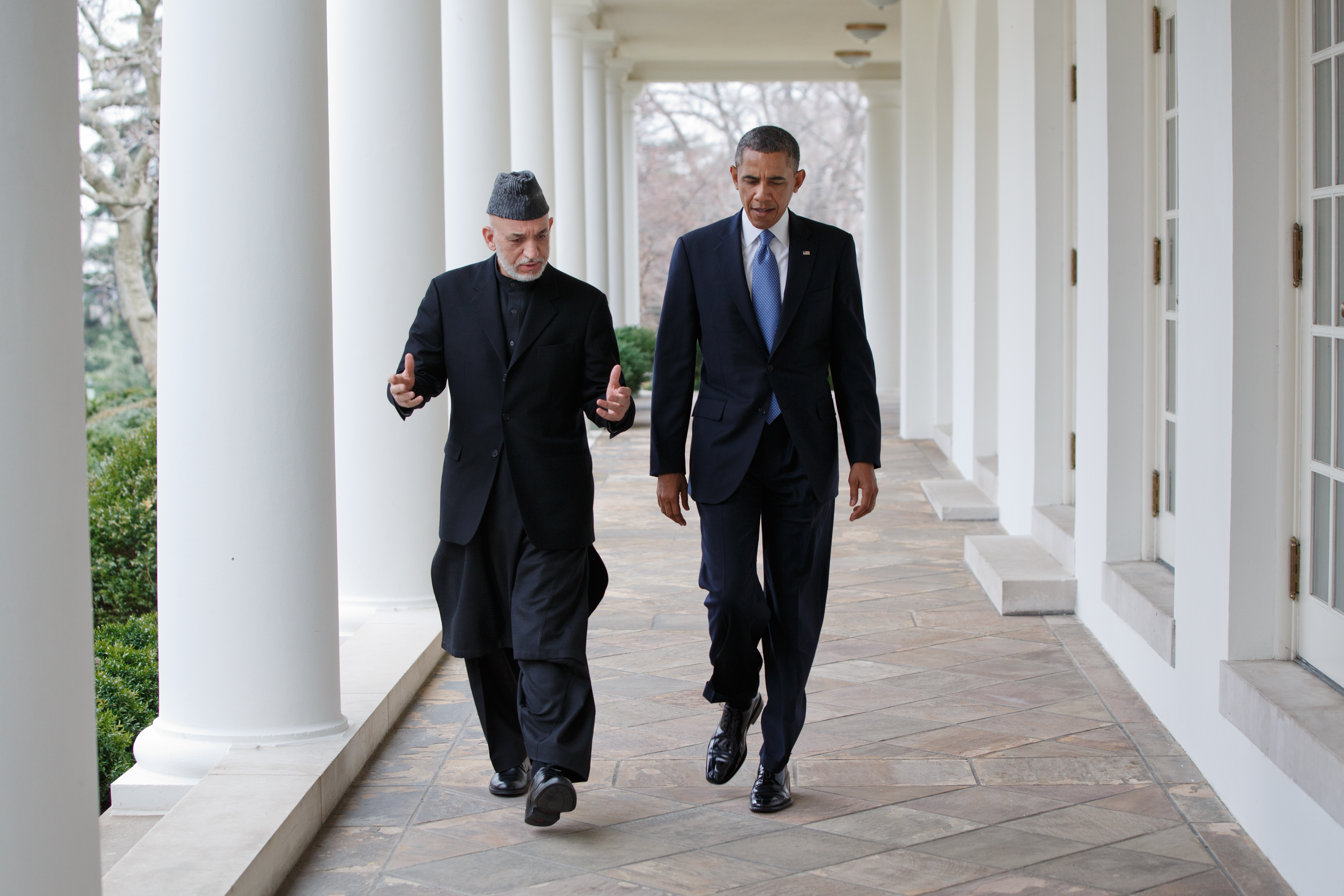

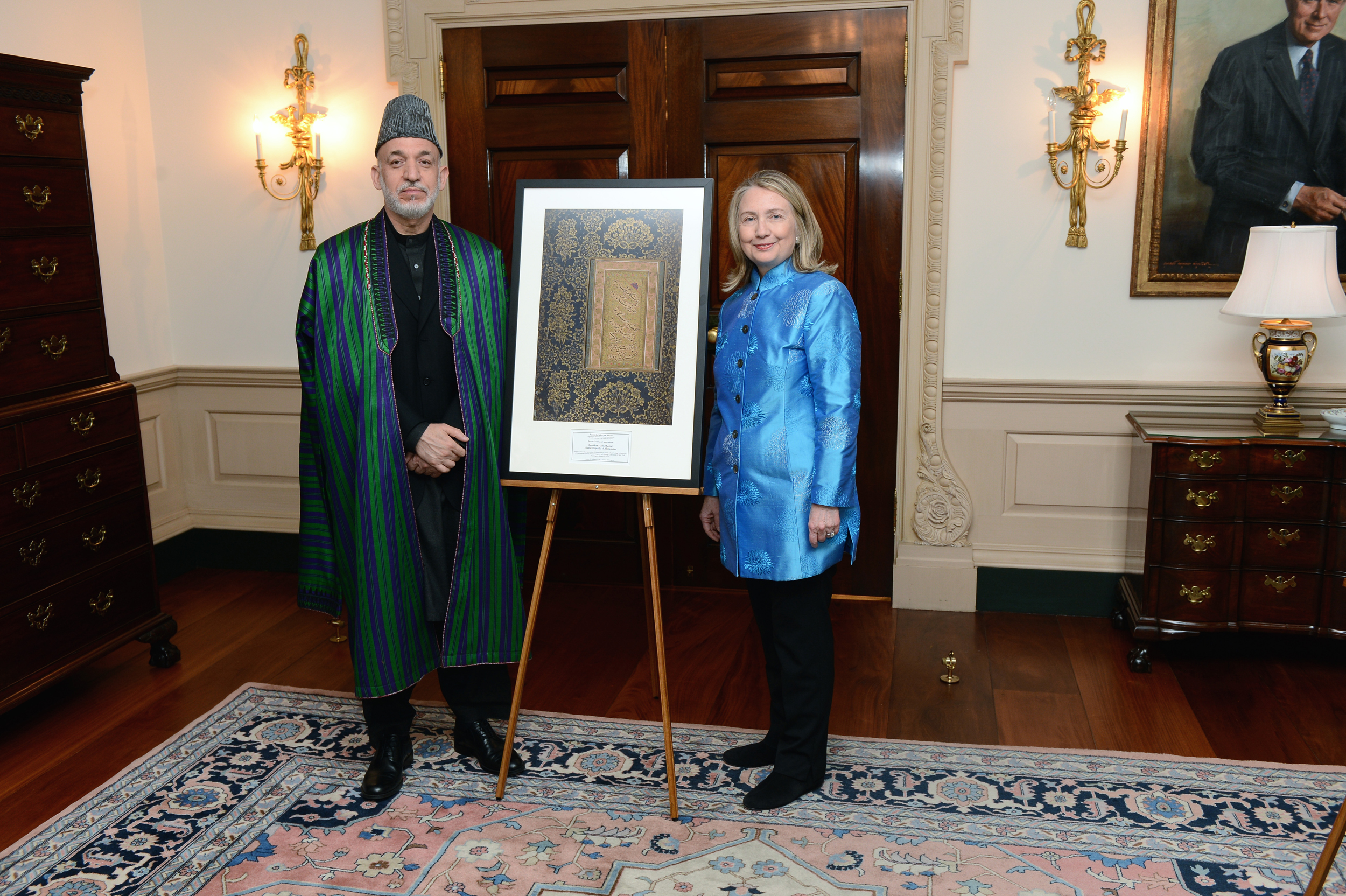

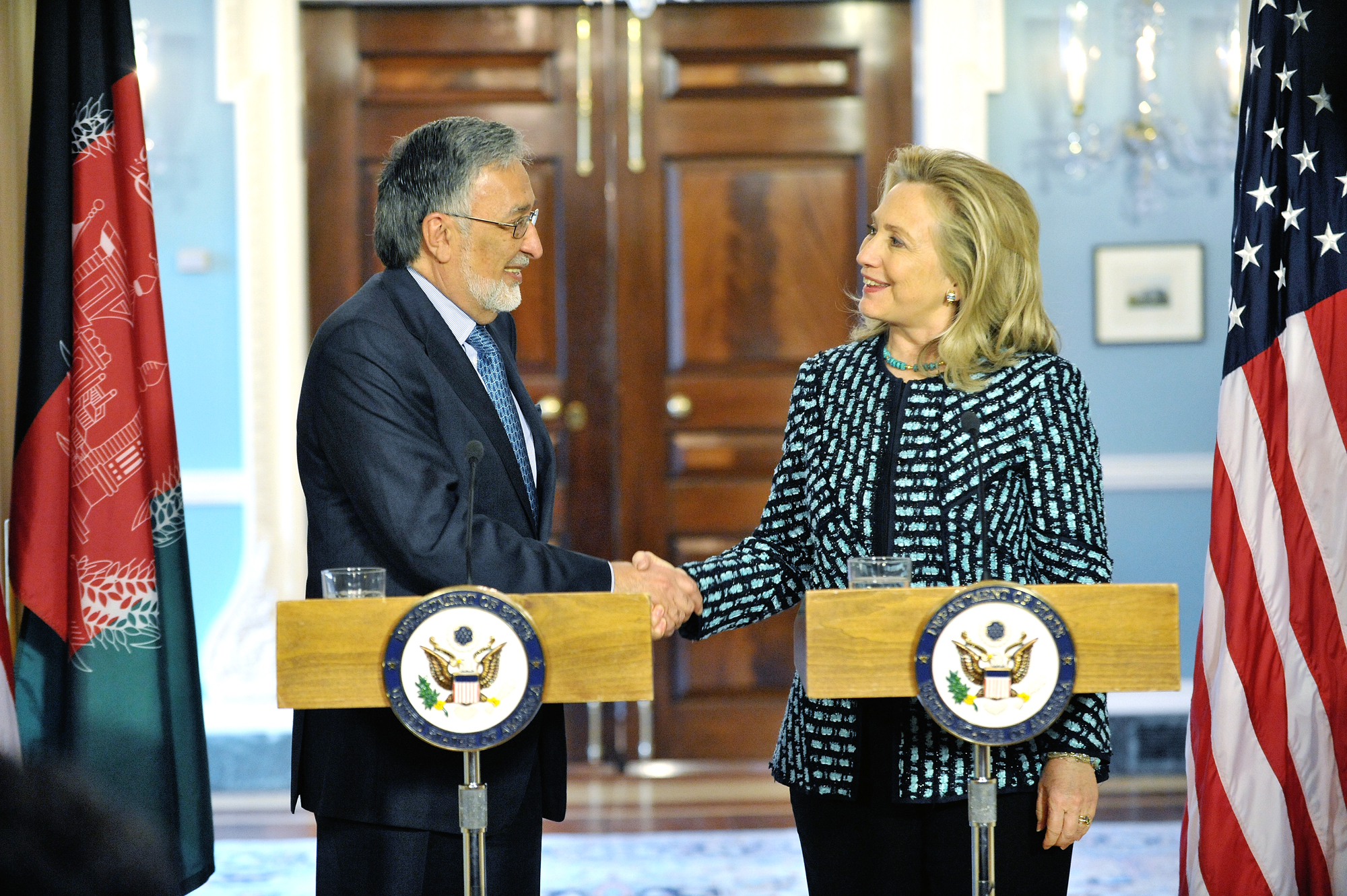

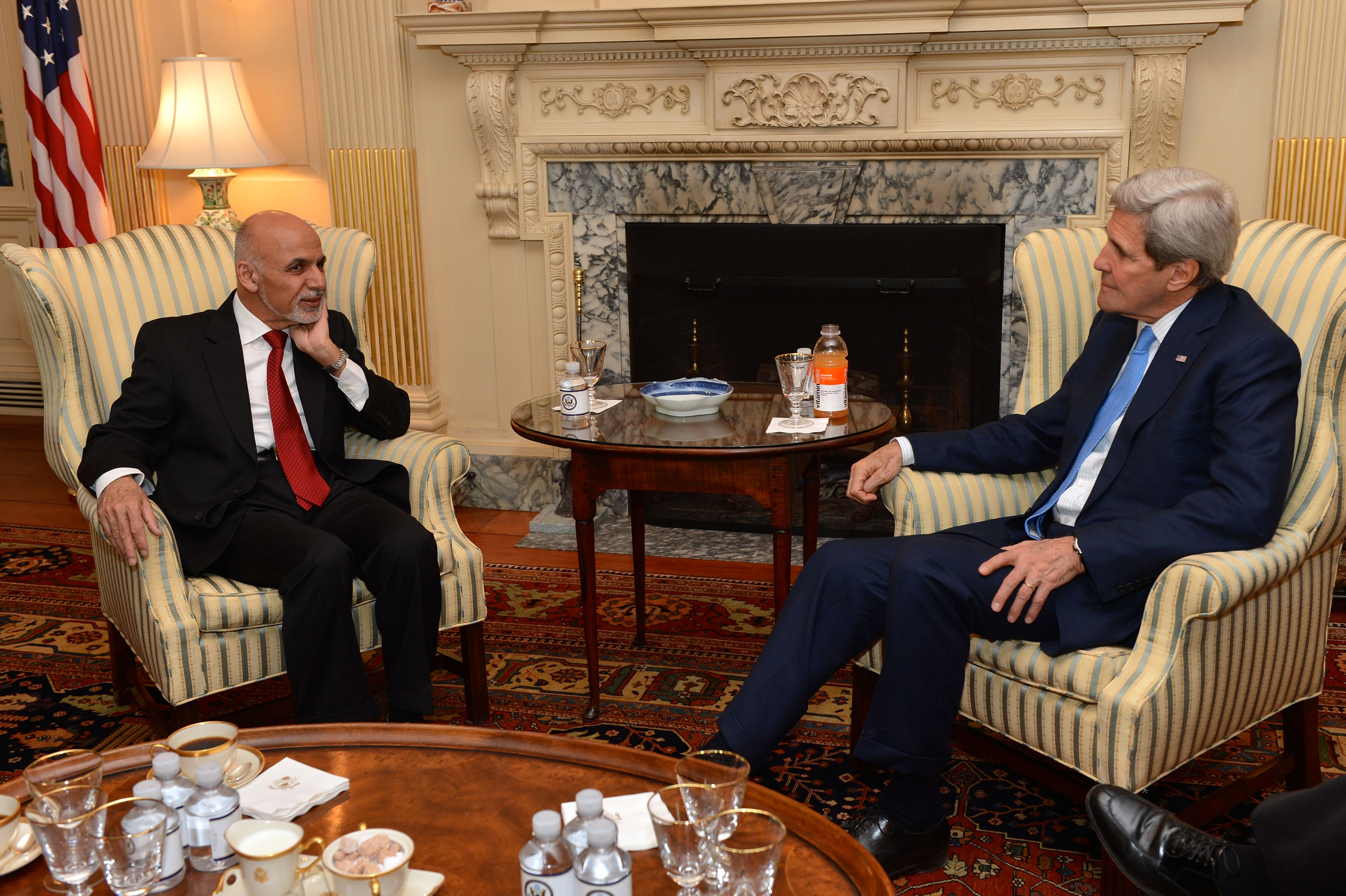

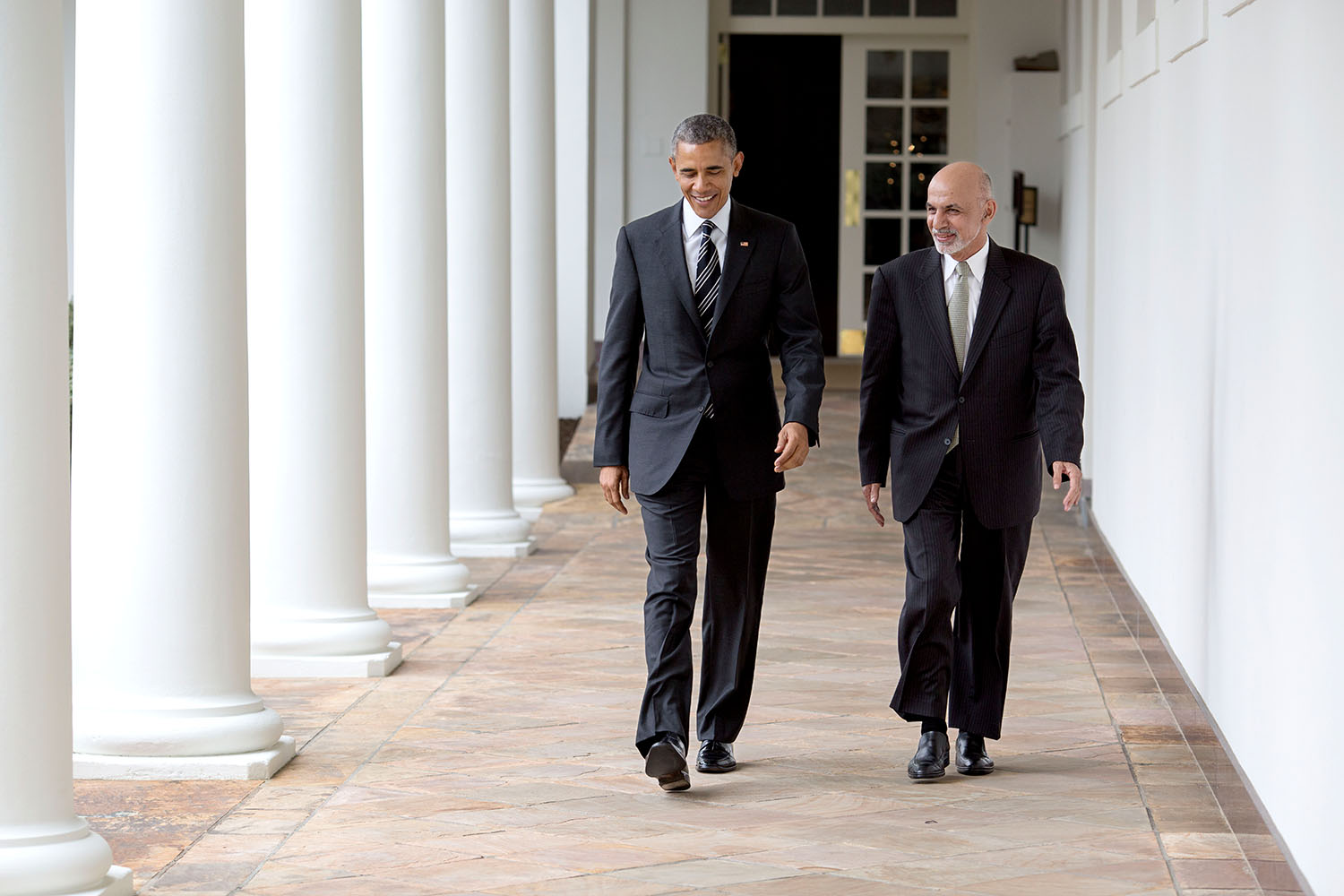

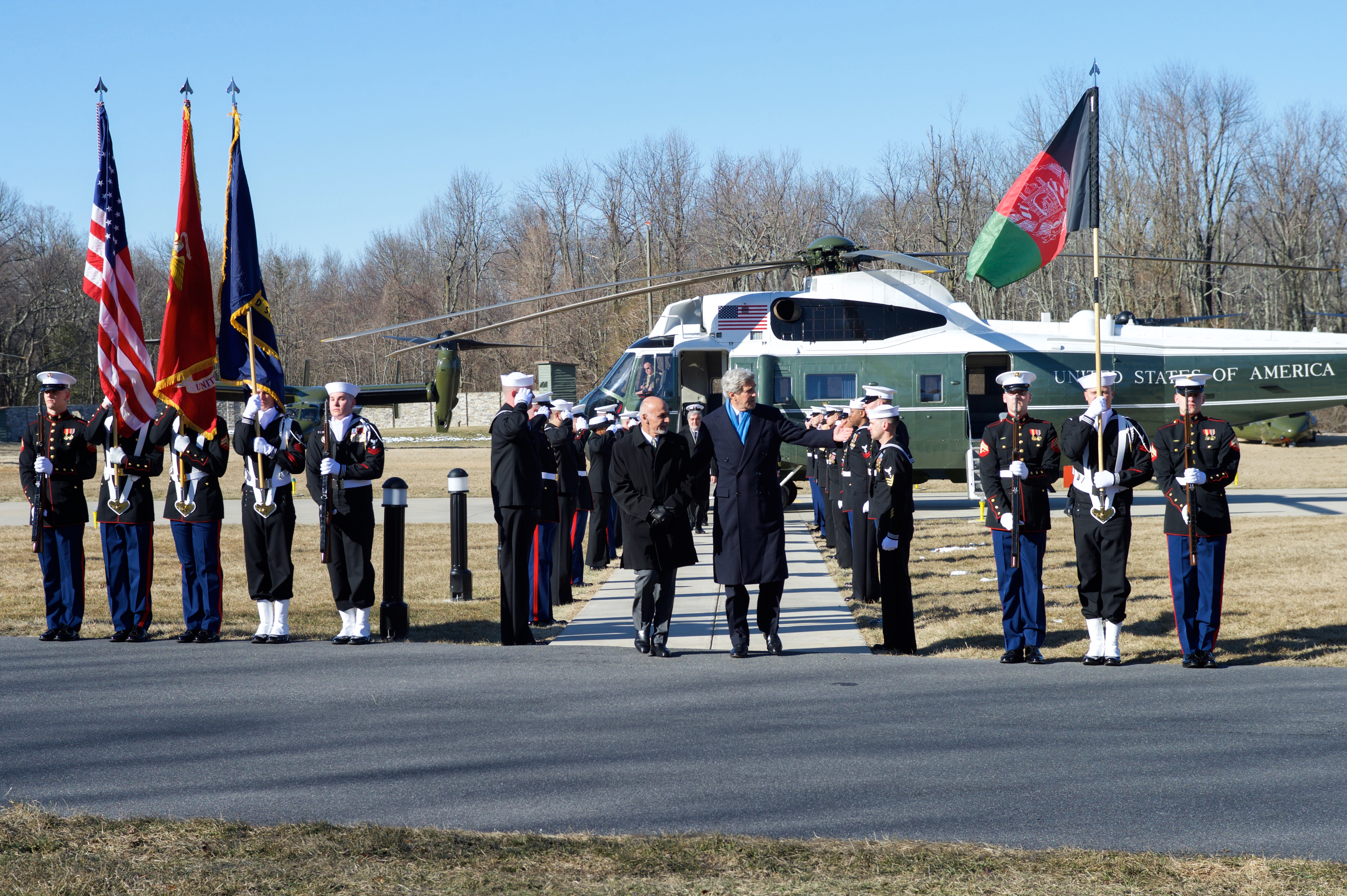

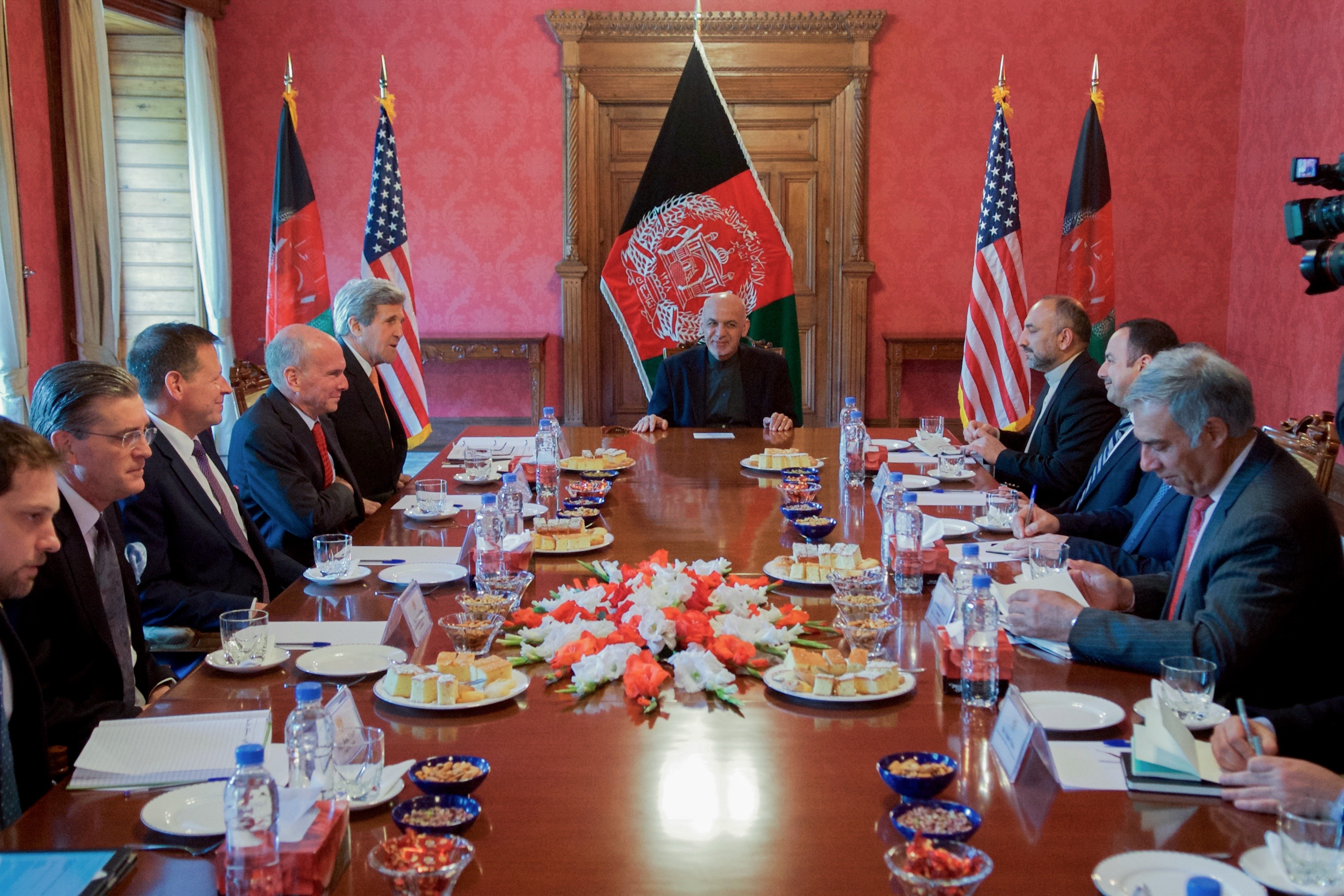

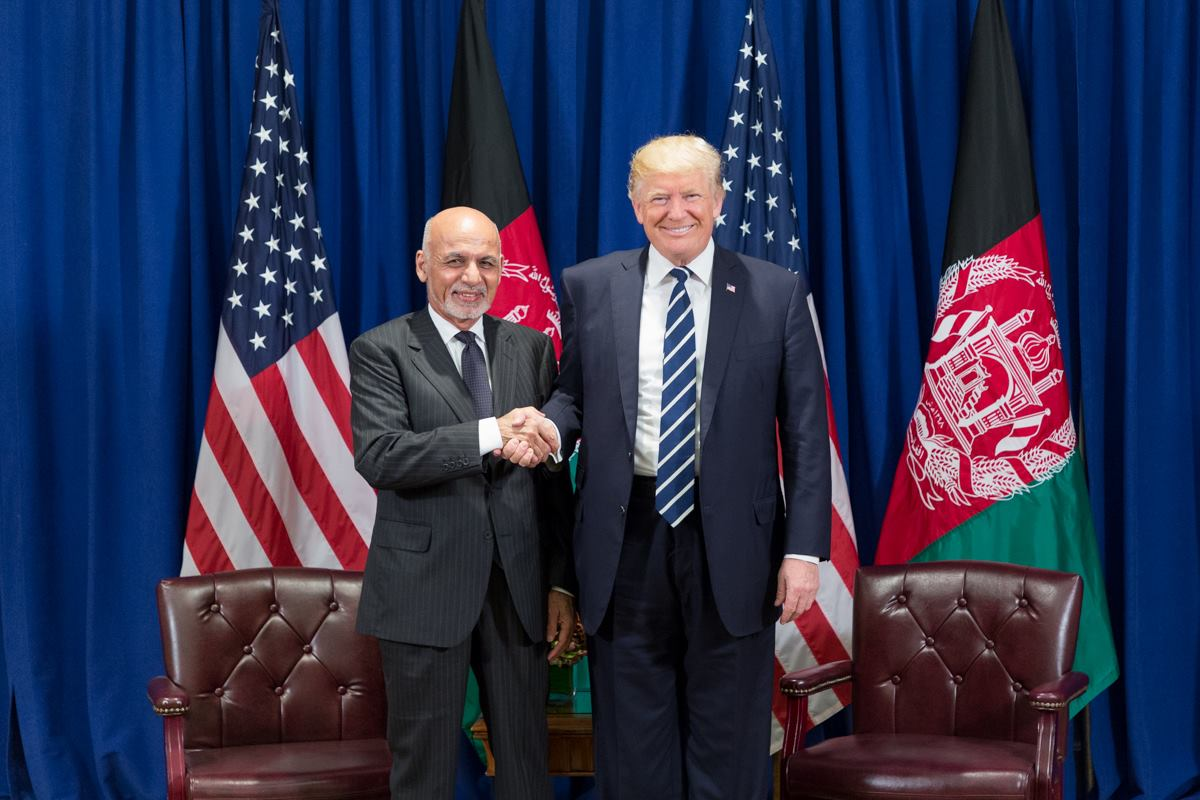

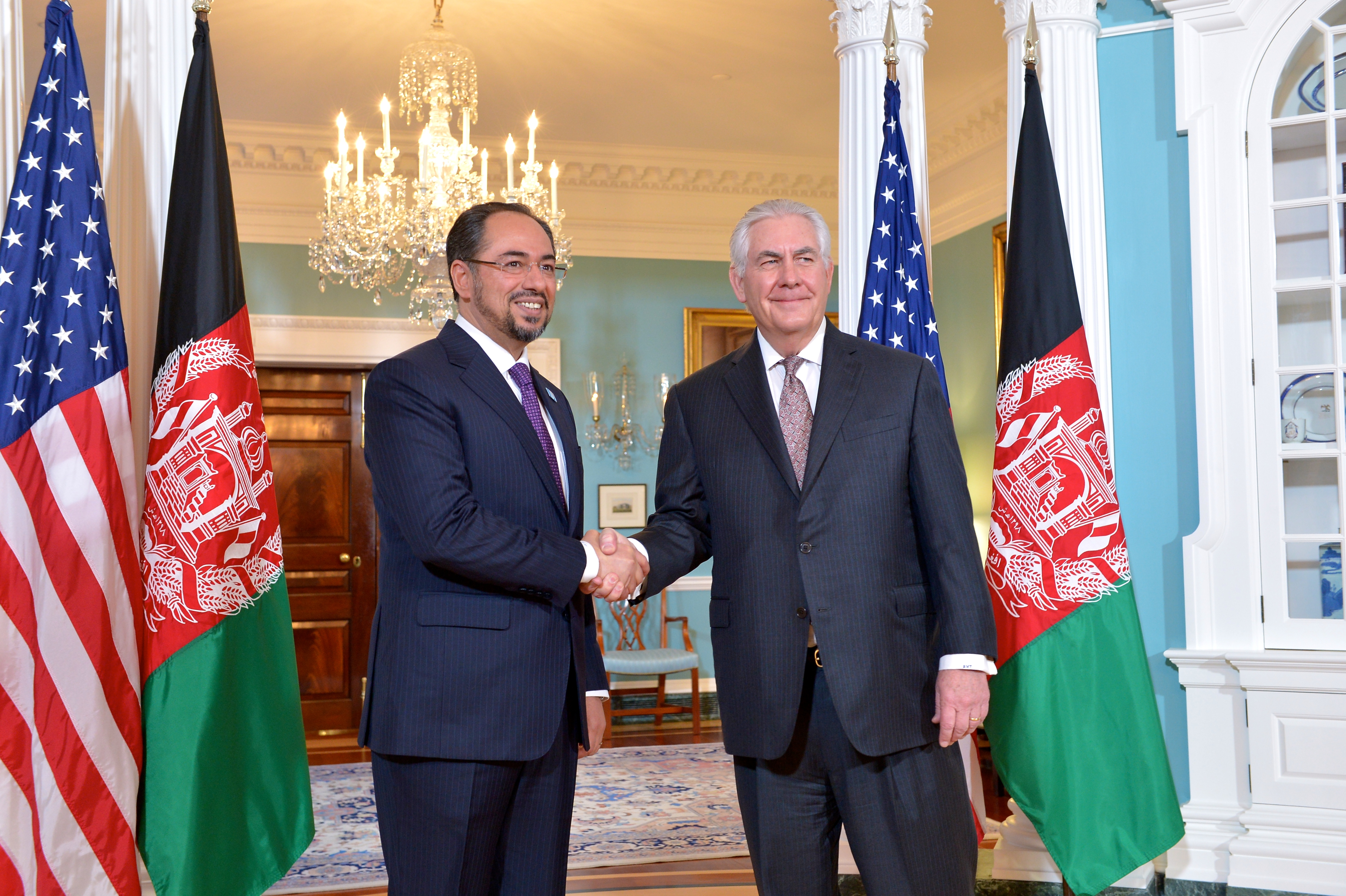

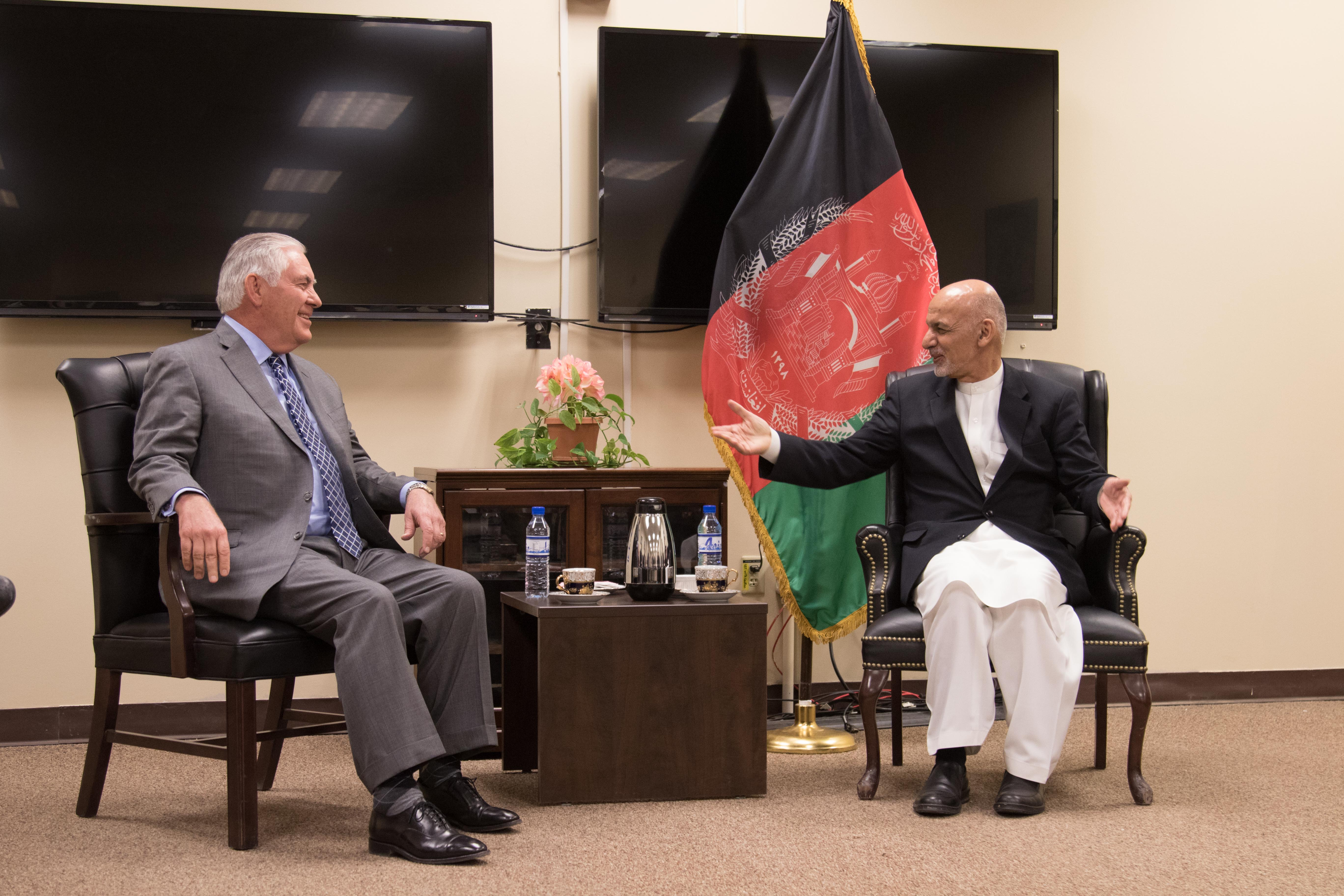

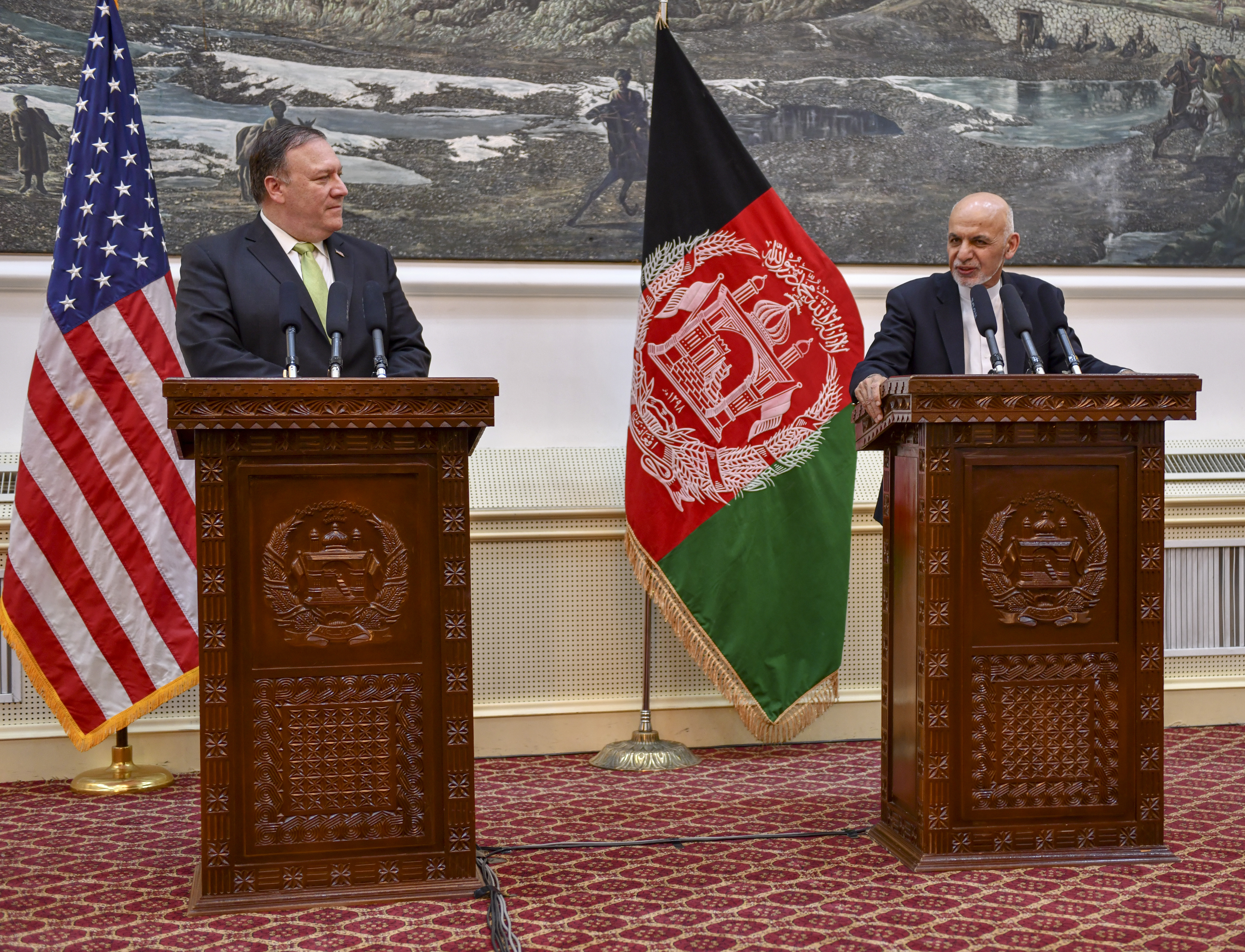

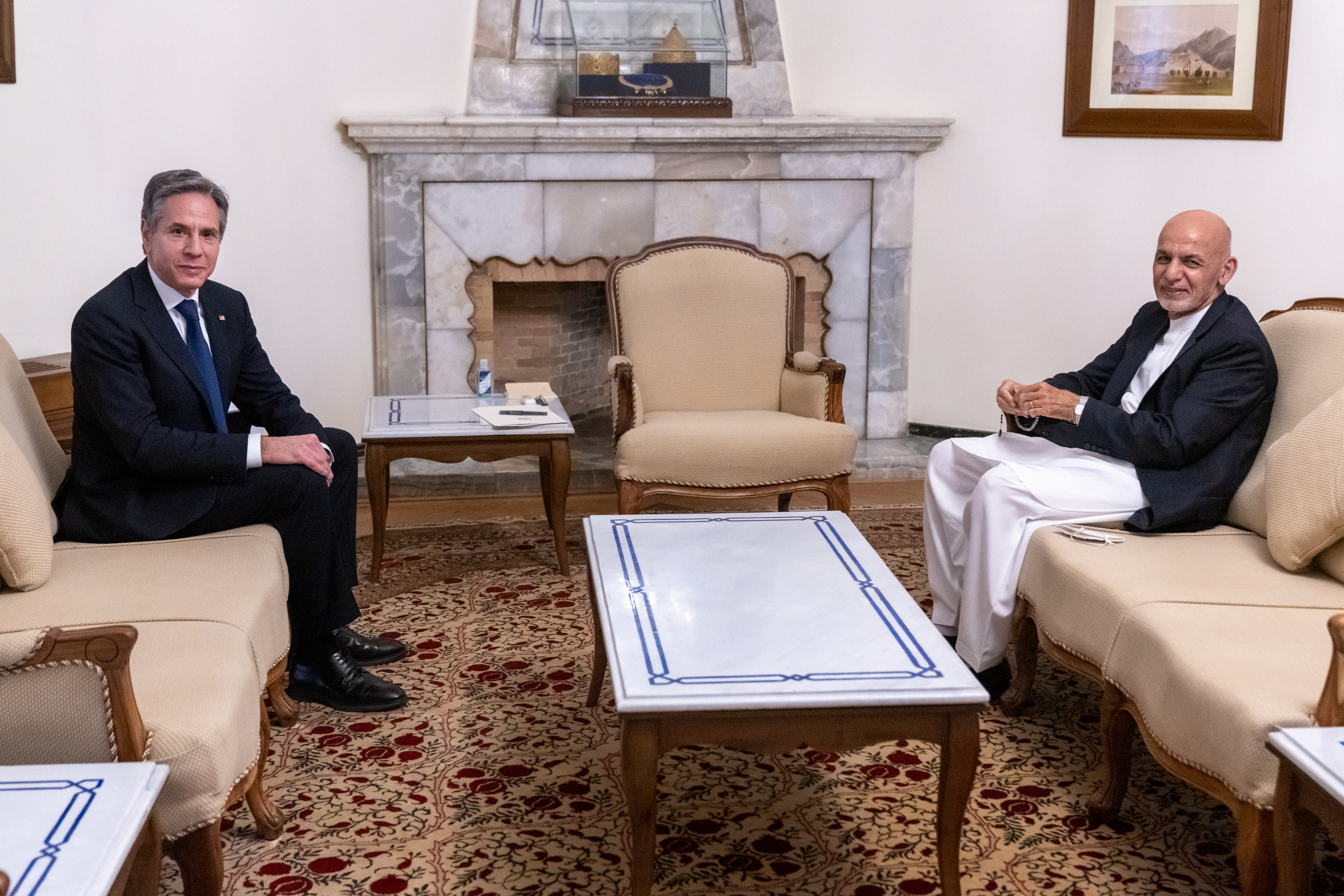

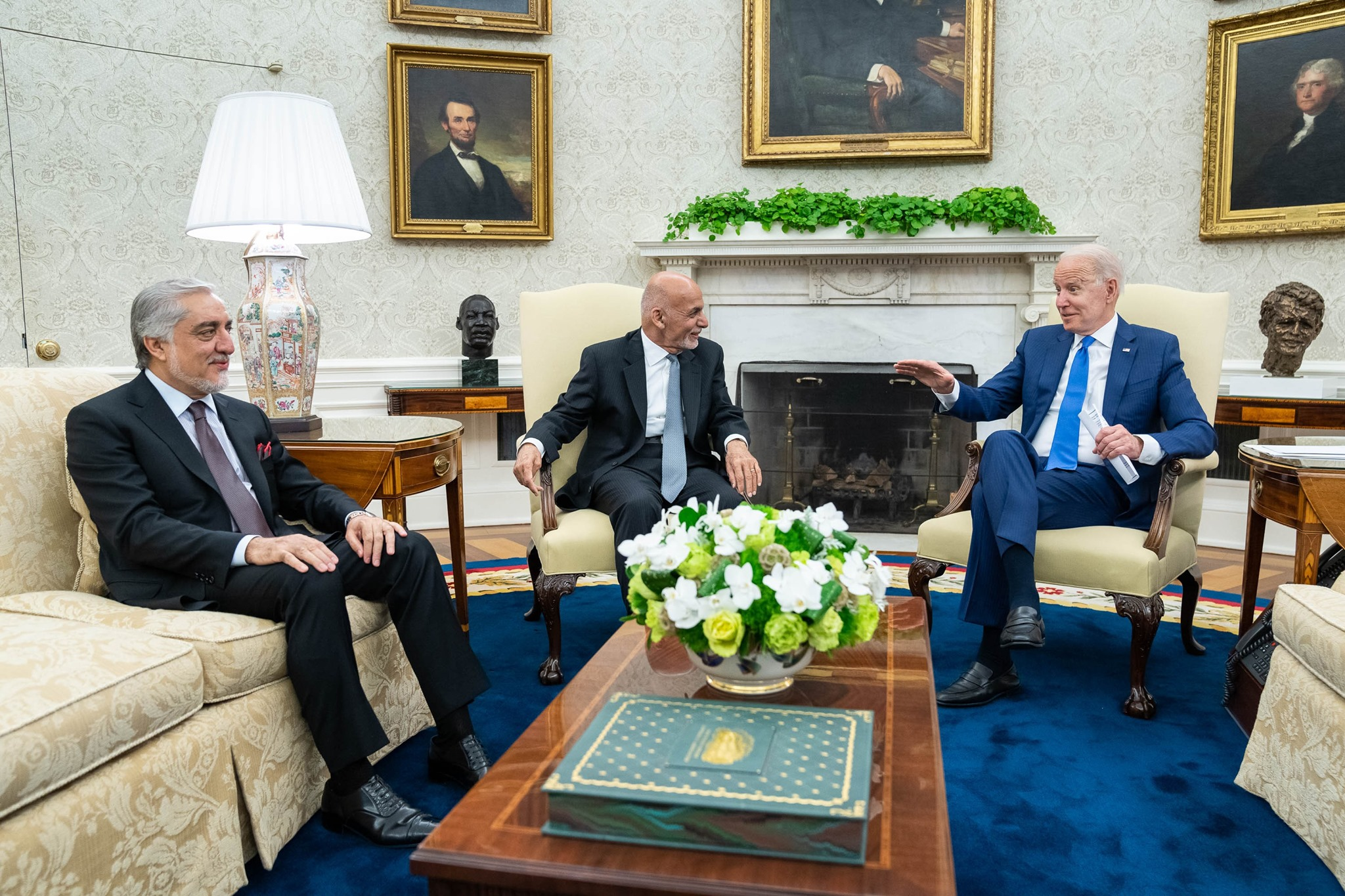

== Bahrain ==
Table of Trips
Start	End	Guest	Title	Reason
July 17, 1983	July 22, 1983	Isa bin Salman Al Khalifa	Emir	State visit.
October 15, 1991	October 15, 1991	Isa bin Salman Al Khalifa	Emir	State visit.
May 31, 1998	June 3, 1998	Isa bin Salman Al Khalifa	Emir	Working visit.
May 6, 2001	May 8, 2001	Hamad bin Isa Al Khalifa	Emir	Working visit.
February 3, 2003	February 4, 2003	Hamad bin Isa Al Khalifa	Emir	Working visit.
November 29, 2004	November 29, 2004	Hamad bin Isa Al Khalifa	King	Working visit.
September 19, 2006	September 19, 2006	Haya Rashed al-Khalifa	President of 61st UN General Assembly	Met with President Bush at the UN General Assembly in New York City
March 22, 2008	March 25, 2008	Hamad bin Isa Al Khalifa	King	Working visit.
November 30, 2017	November 30, 2017	Salman bin Hamad Al Khalifa	Crown Prince	Working visit. Met with President Trump
September 15, 2019	September 17, 2019	Salman bin Hamad Al Khalifa	Crown Prince	Working Visit.
July 16, 2025	July 16, 2025	Salman bin Hamad Al Khalifa	Crown Prince	Working Visit.

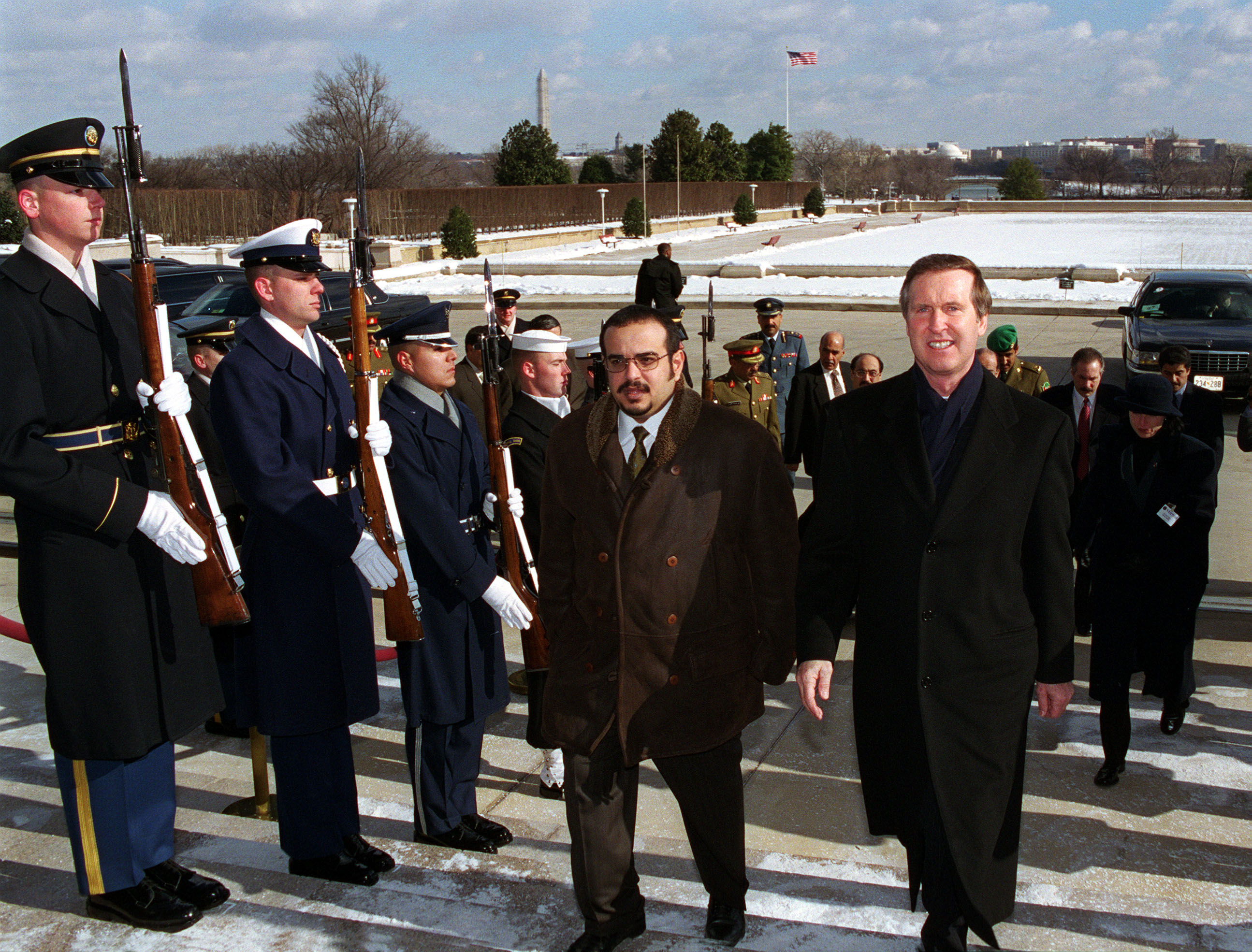

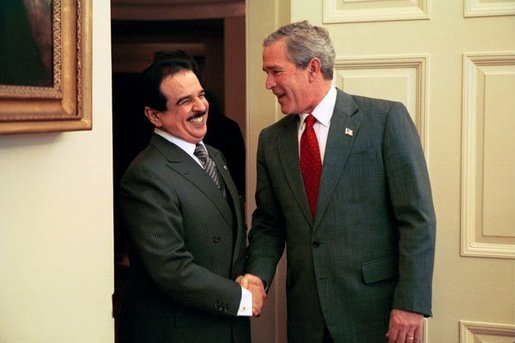

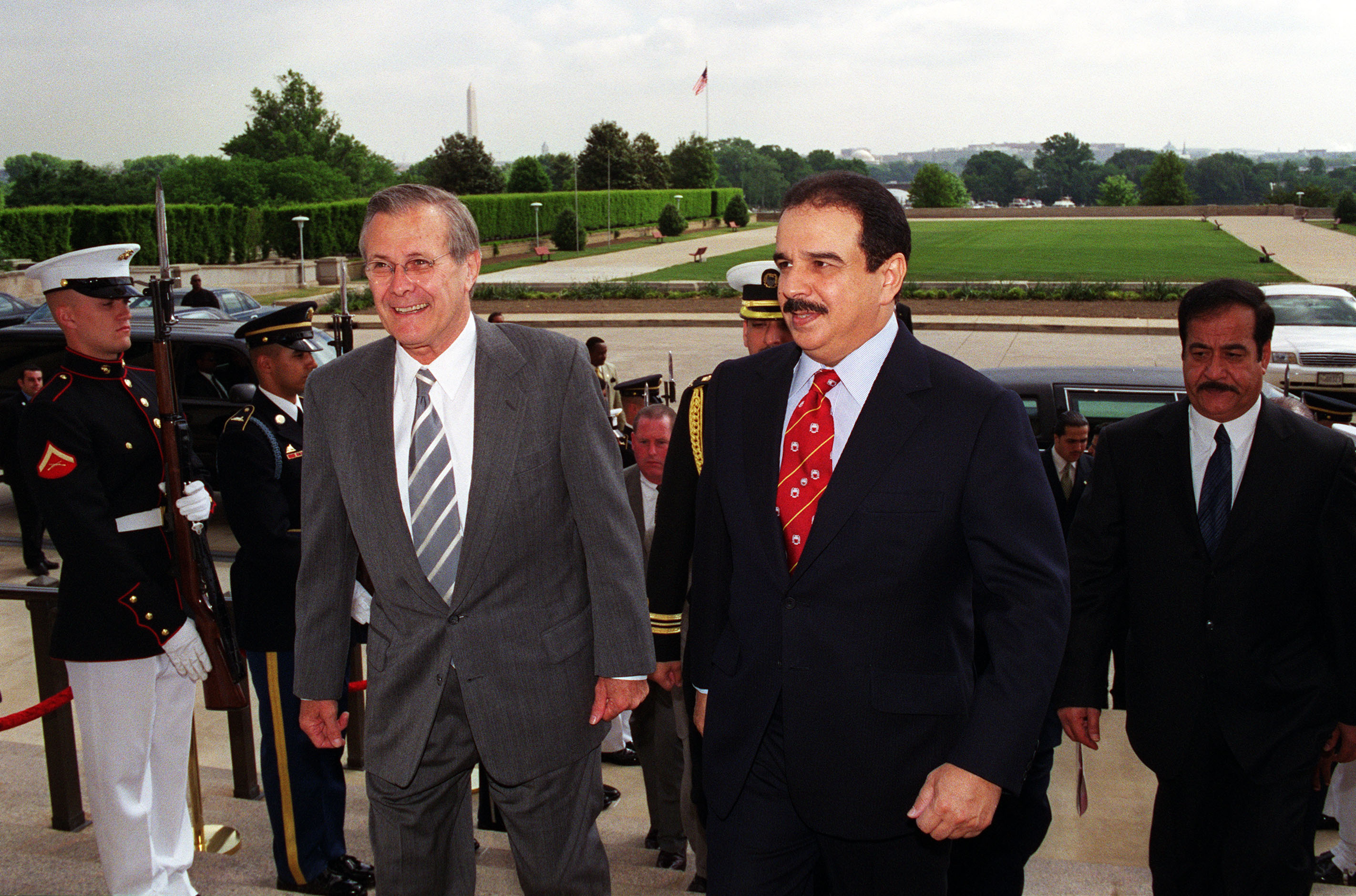

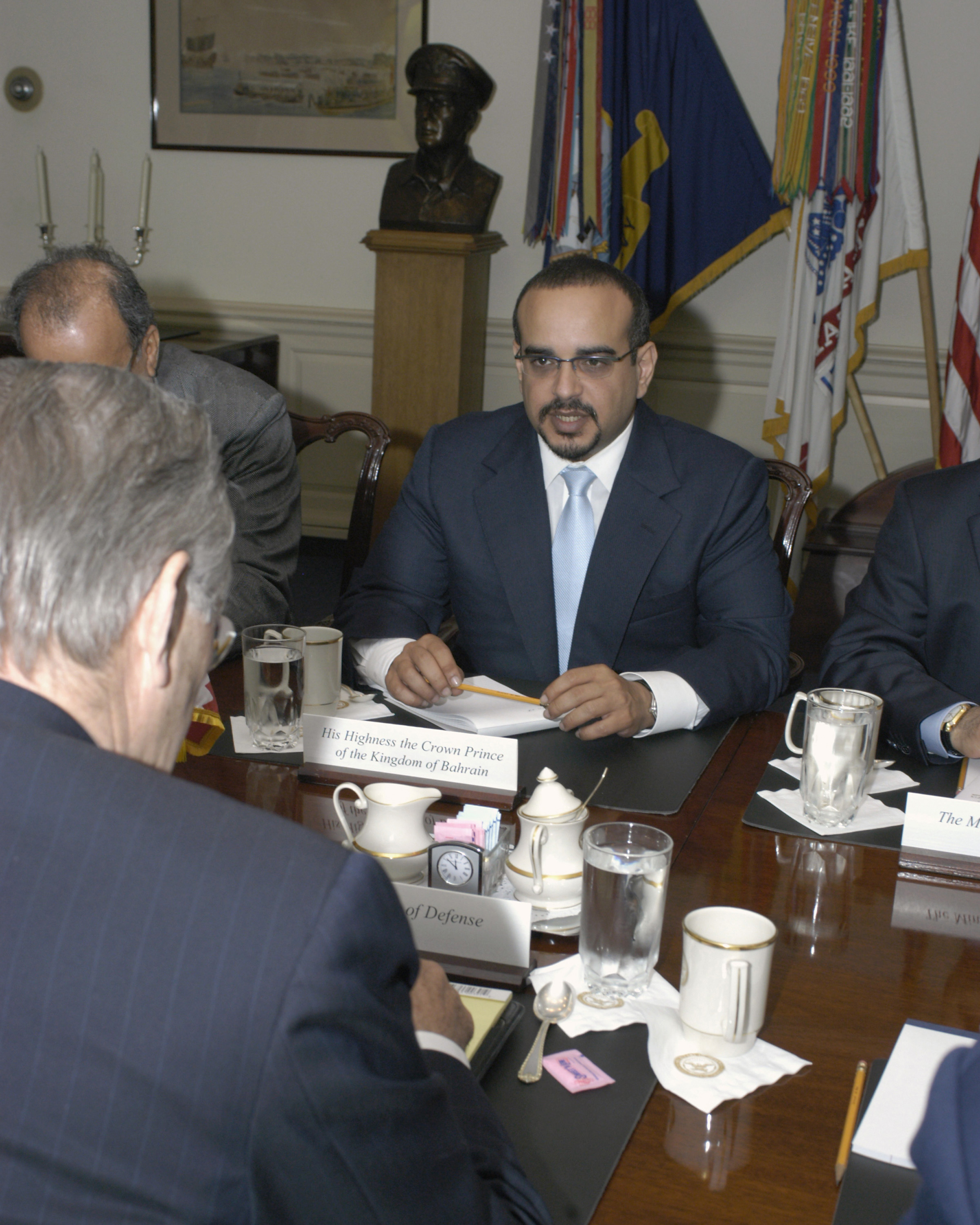

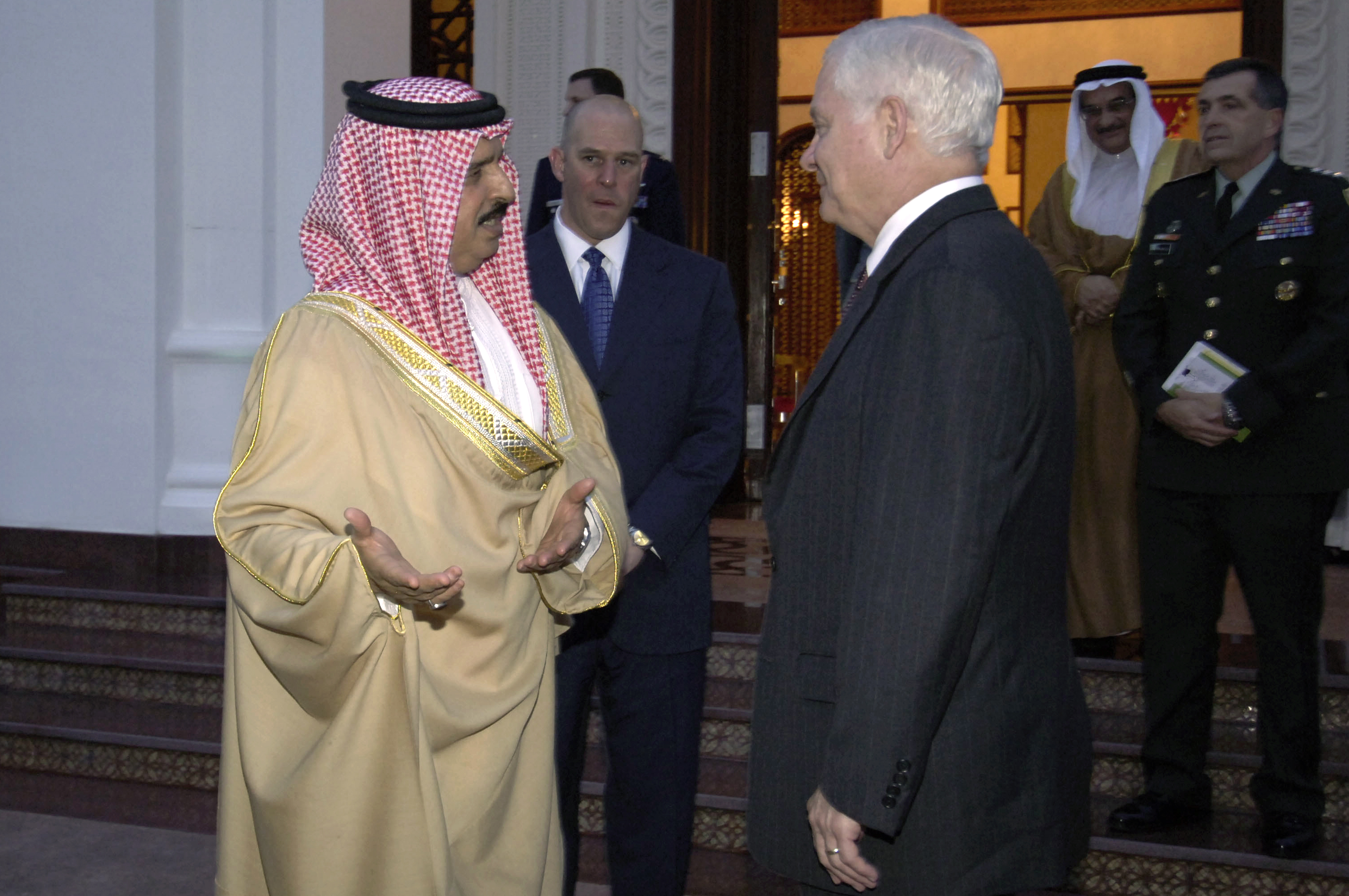

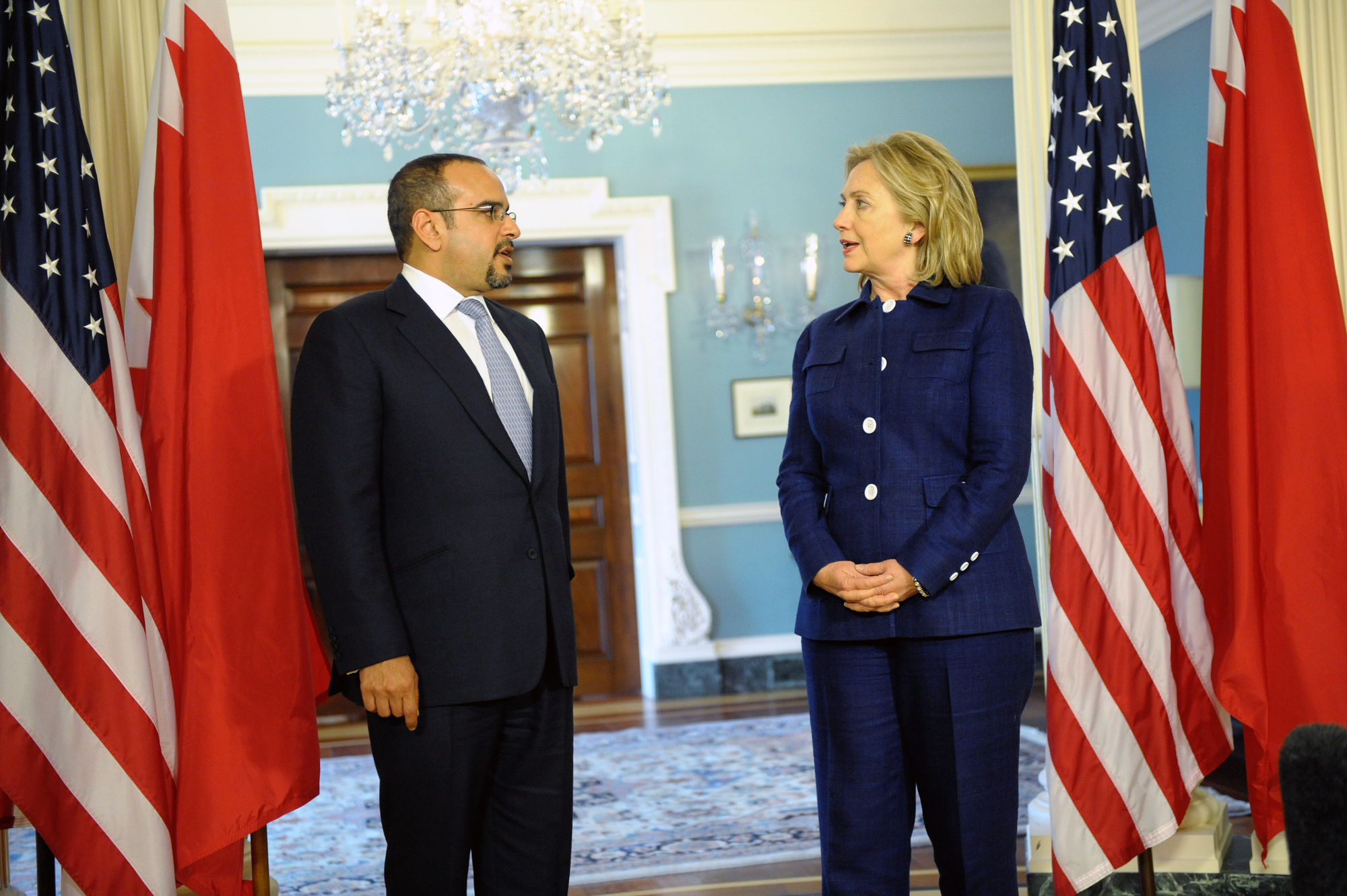

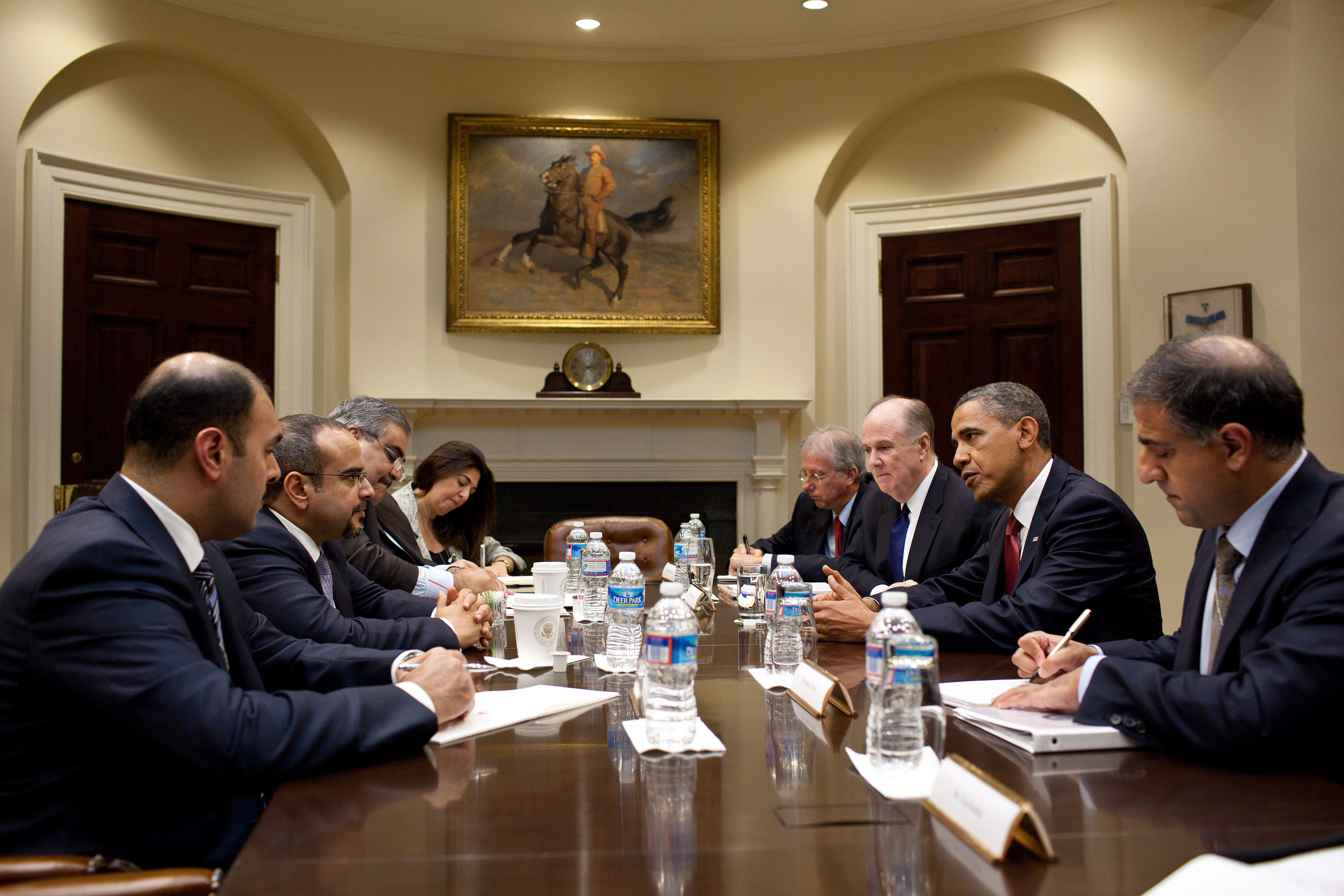

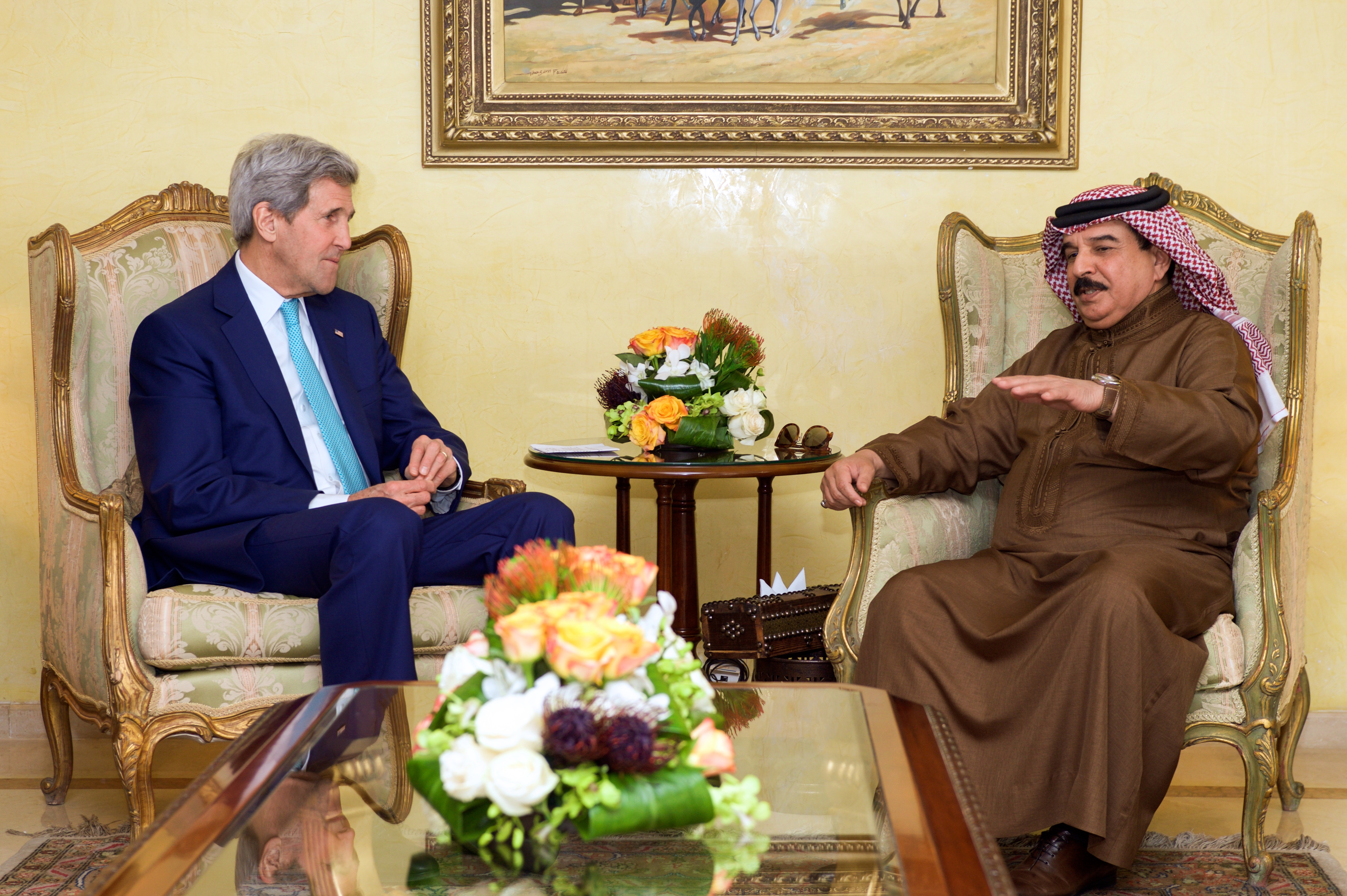

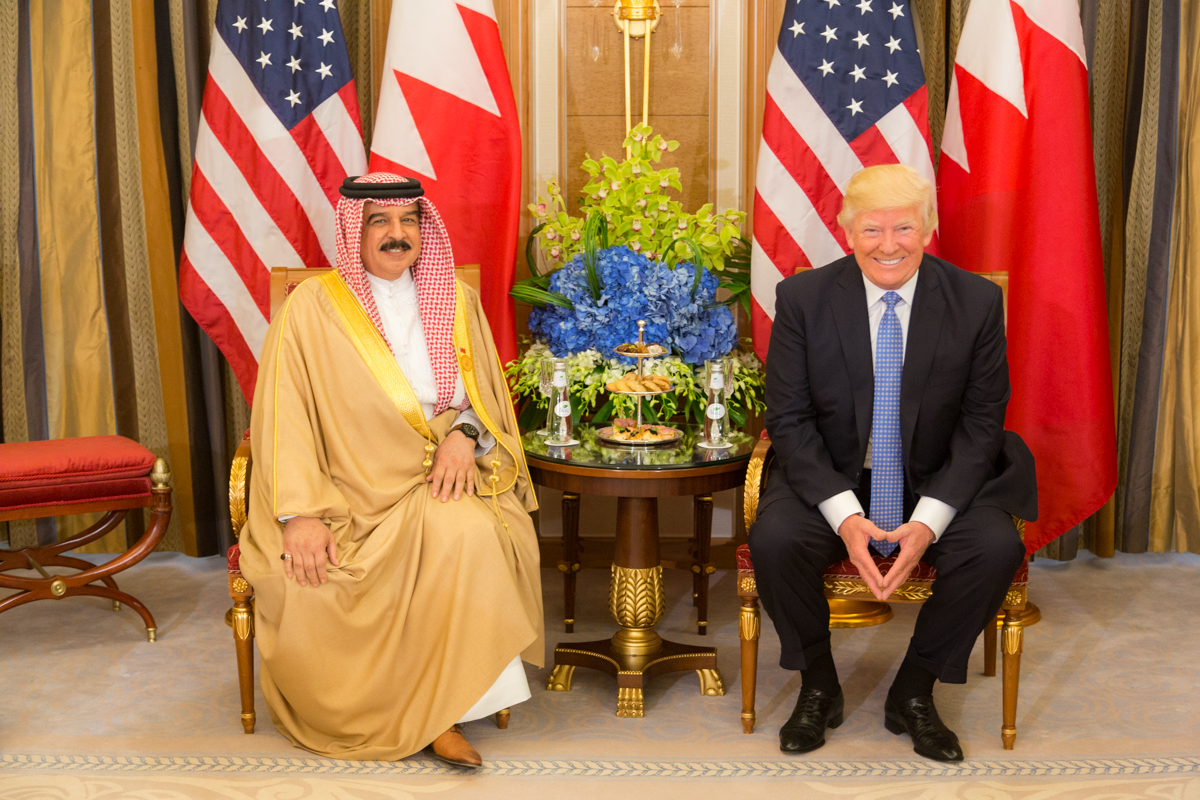

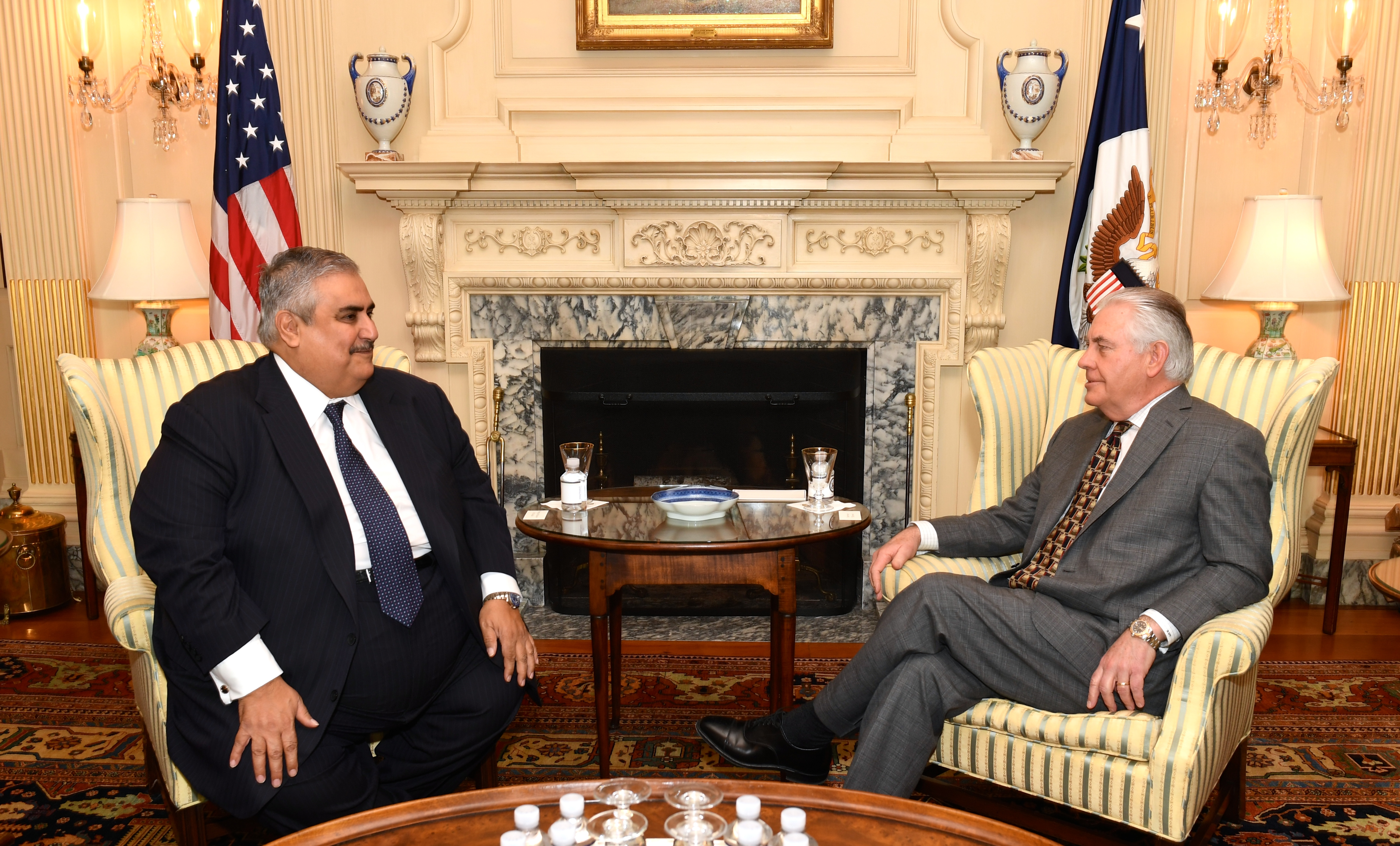

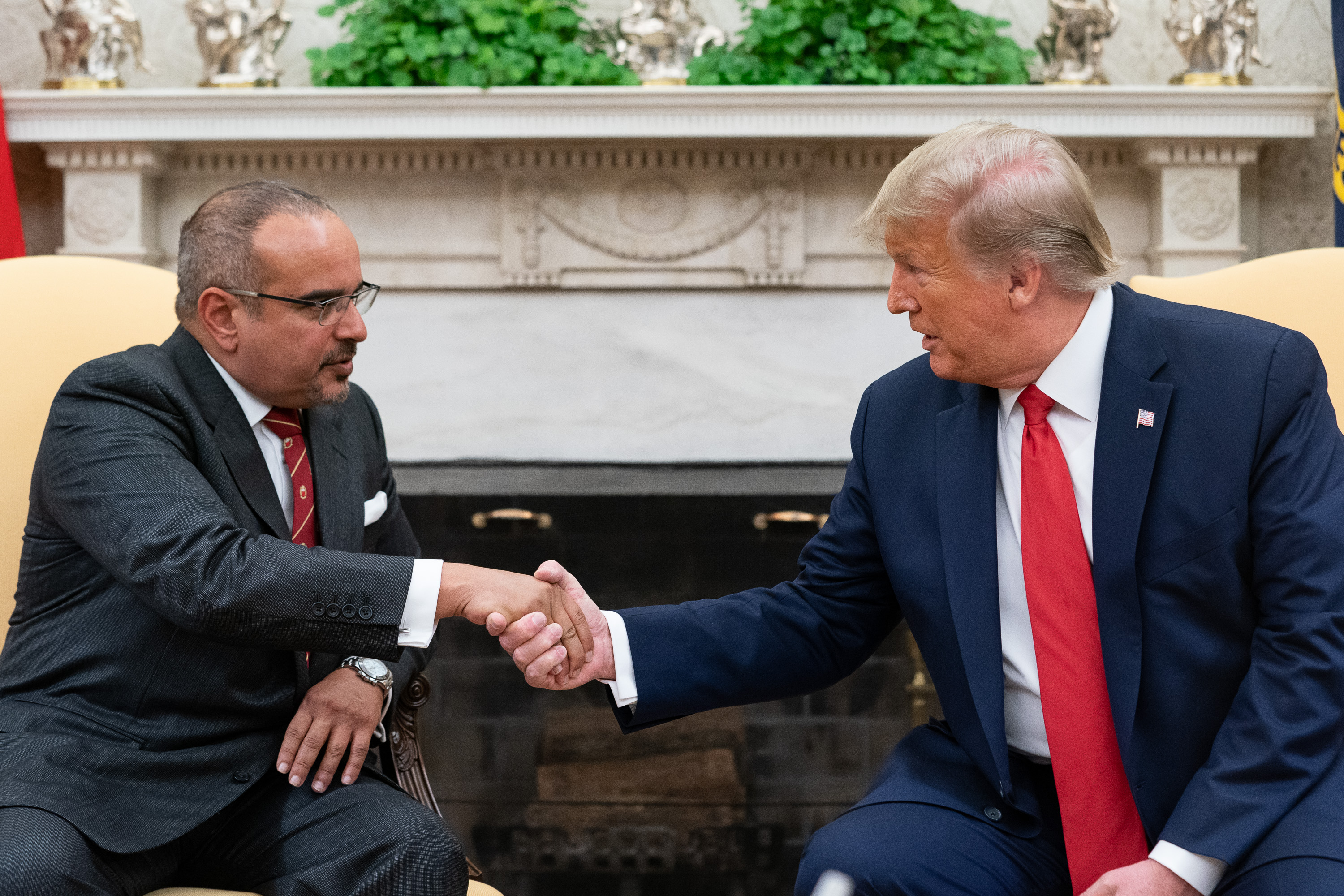

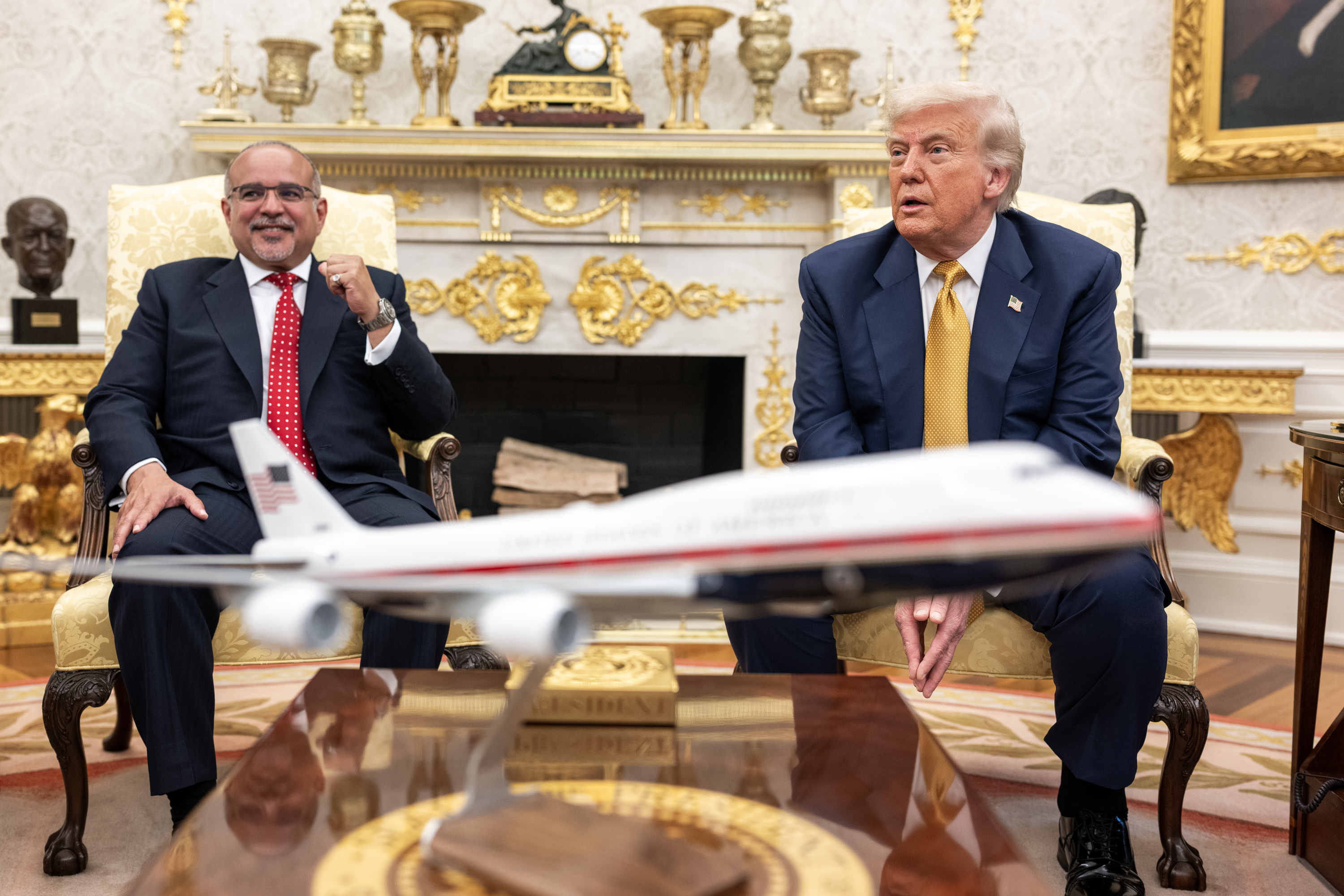

== Bangladesh ==
Table of Trips
Start	End	Guest	Title	Reason
October 1, 1974	October 1, 1974	Sheikh Mujibur Rahman	Prime Minister	Private visit.
August 25, 1980	August 27, 1980	Ziaur Rahman	President	Private visit. Met with President Carter August 27.
September 24, 1983	September 26, 1983	Hussain Mohammad Ershad	President of the Council of Ministers	Official working visit. Private visit to Houston afterward.
October 1, 1990	October 1, 1990	Hussain Mohammad Ershad	President	Met with President Bush at the UN General Assembly.
March 18, 1992	March 19, 1992	Khaleda Zia	Prime Minister	Met with President Bush during a private visit.
October 16, 2000	October 19, 2000	Sheikh Hasina	Prime Minister	Working Visit.

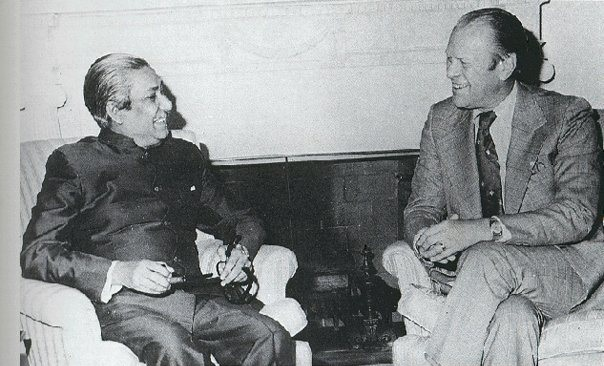

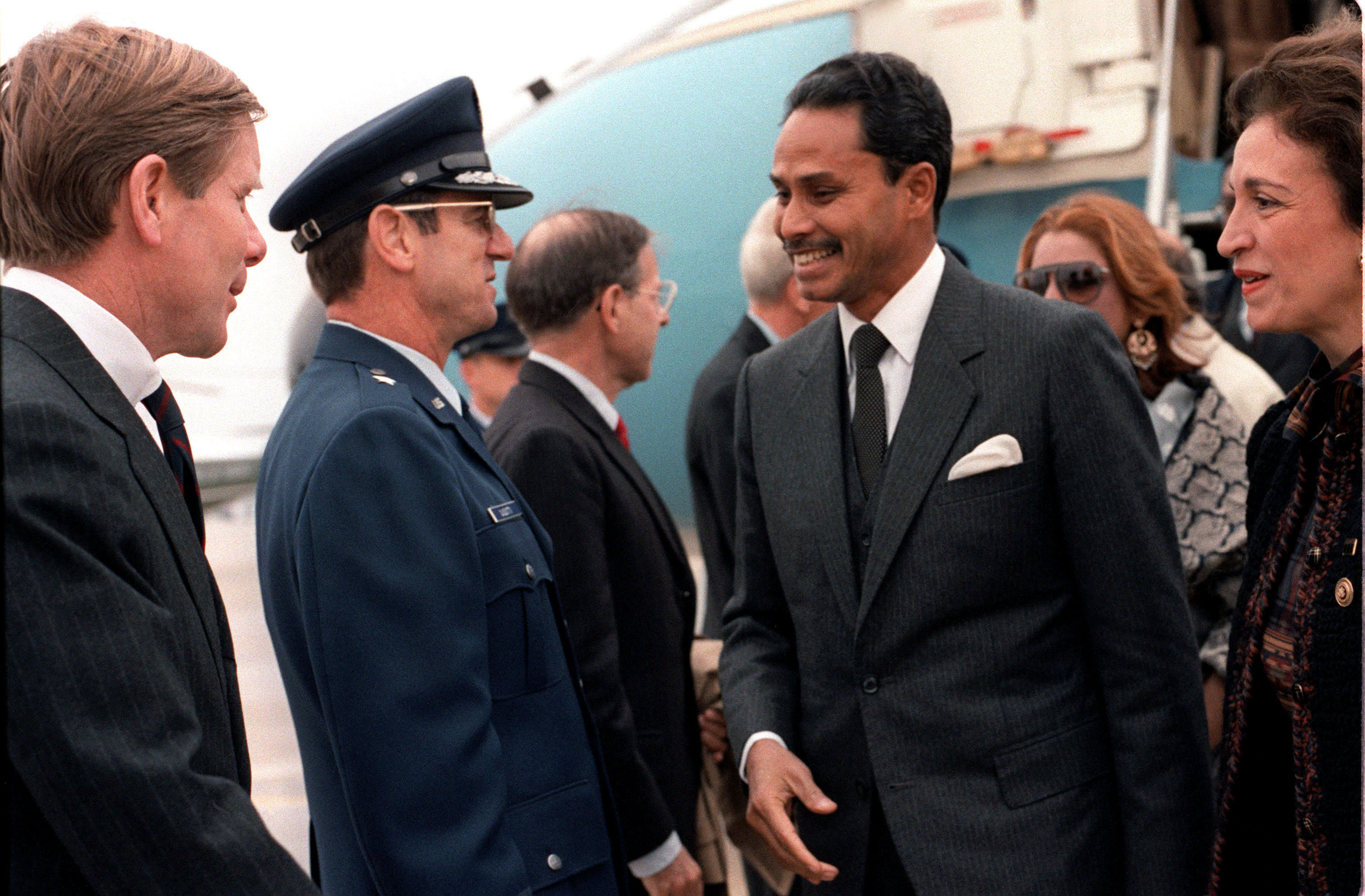

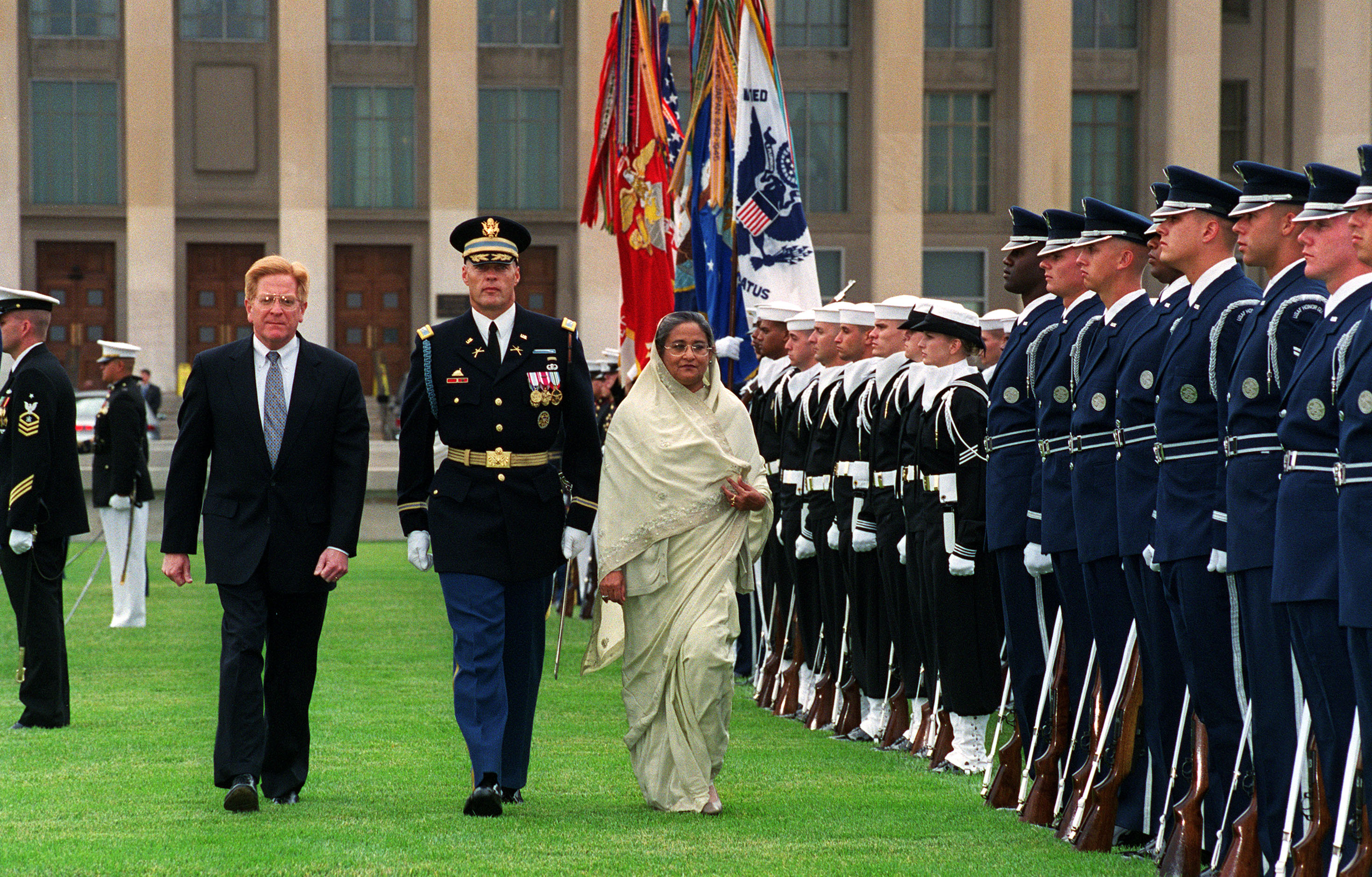

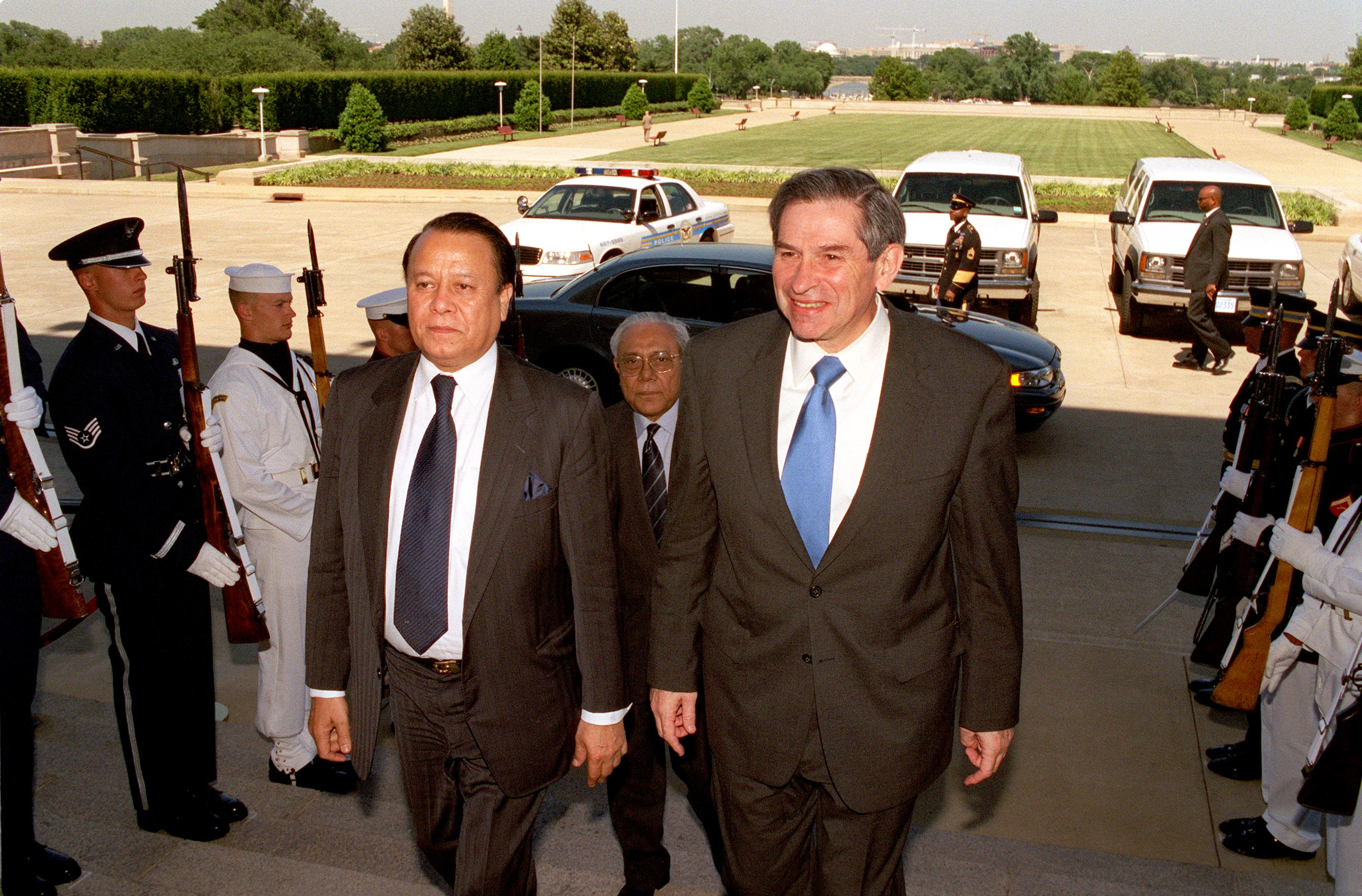

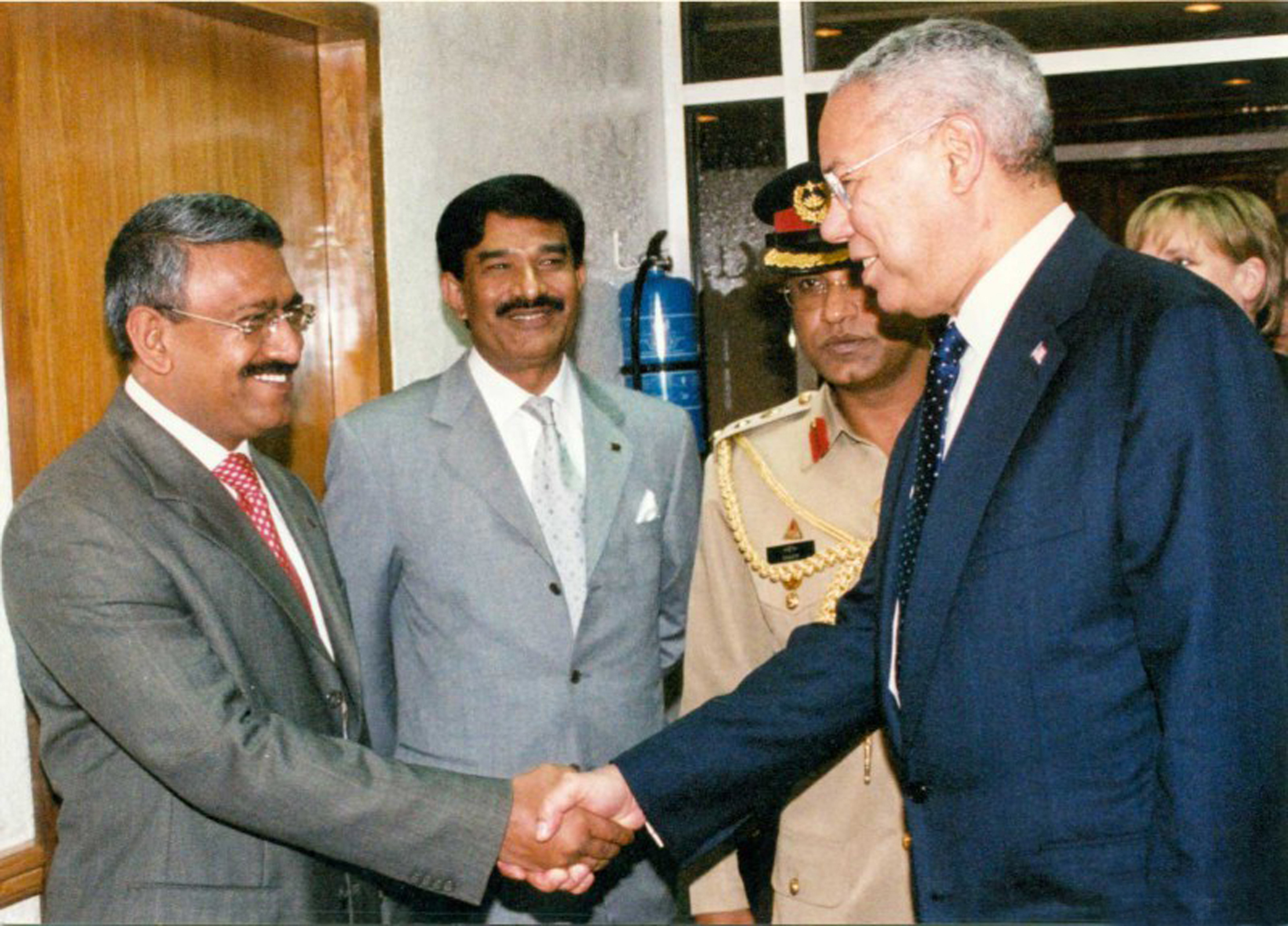

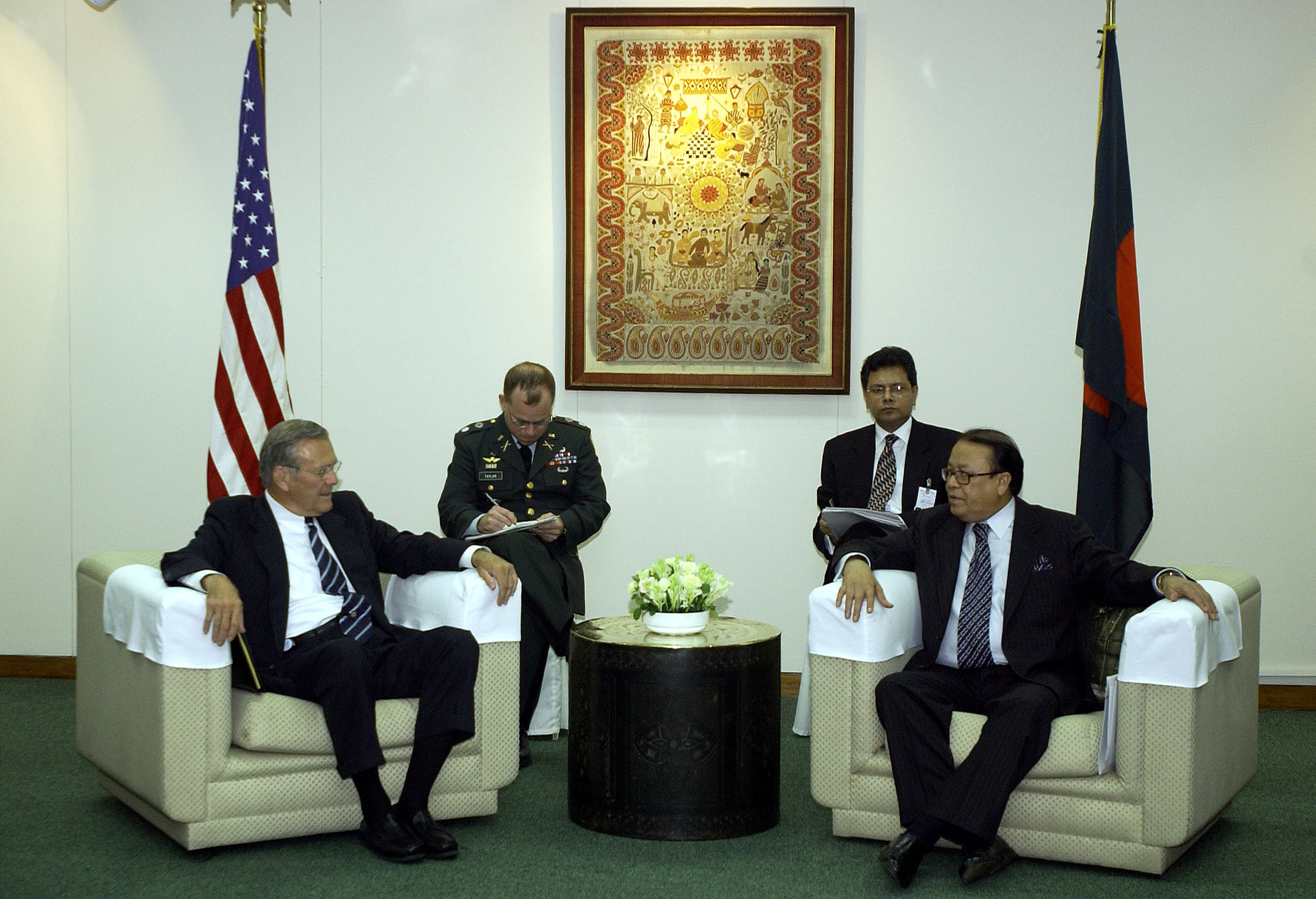

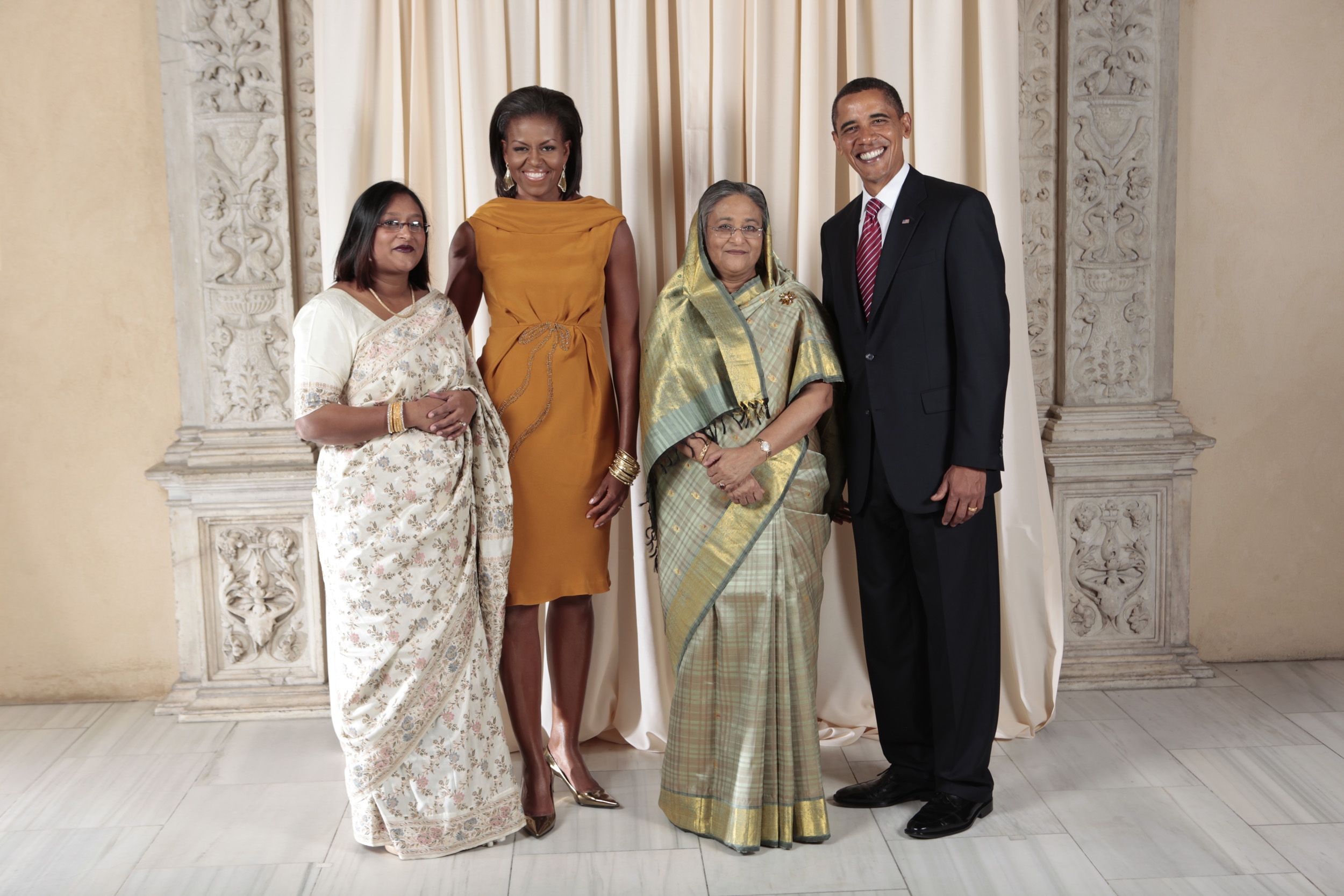

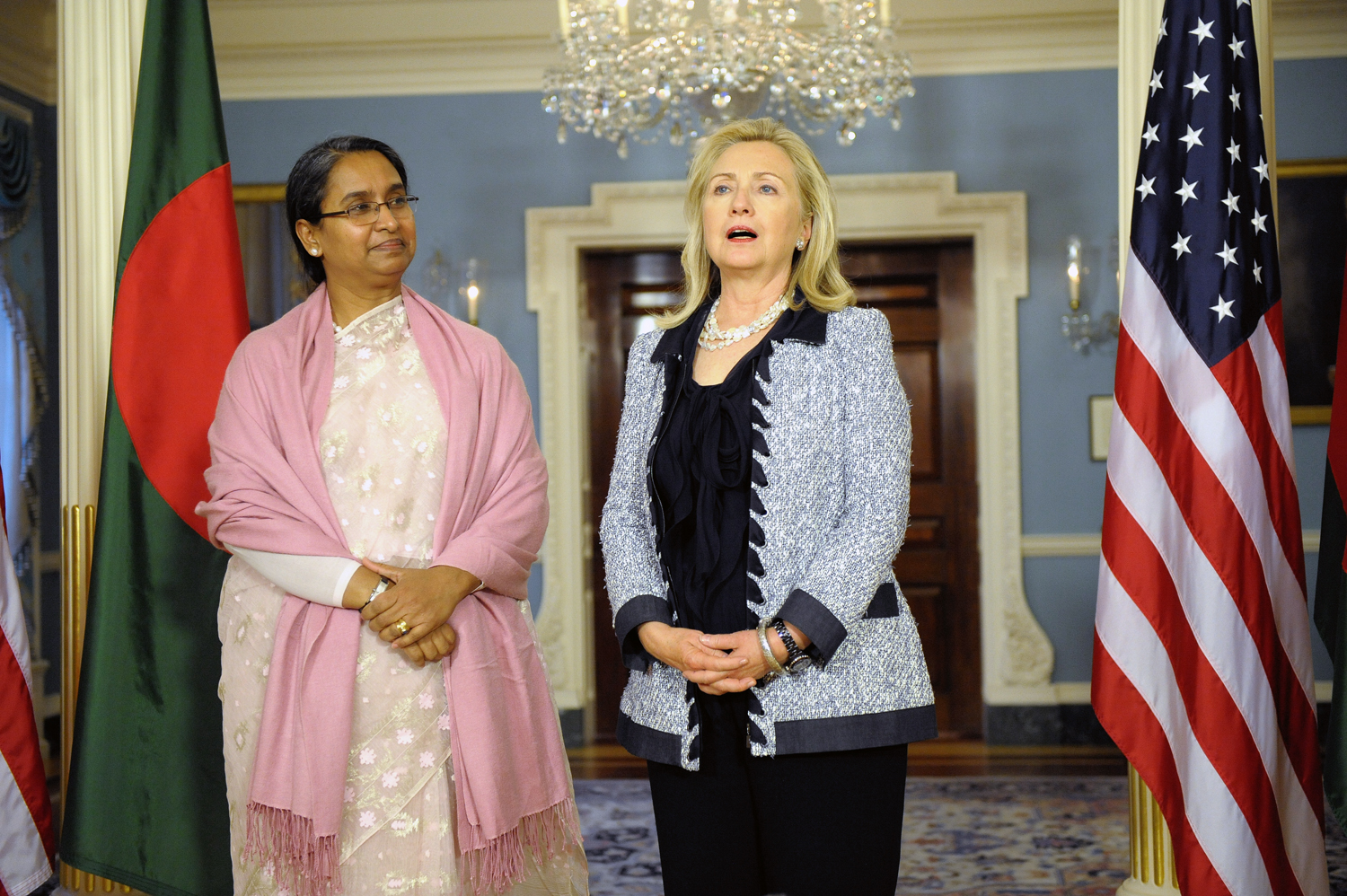

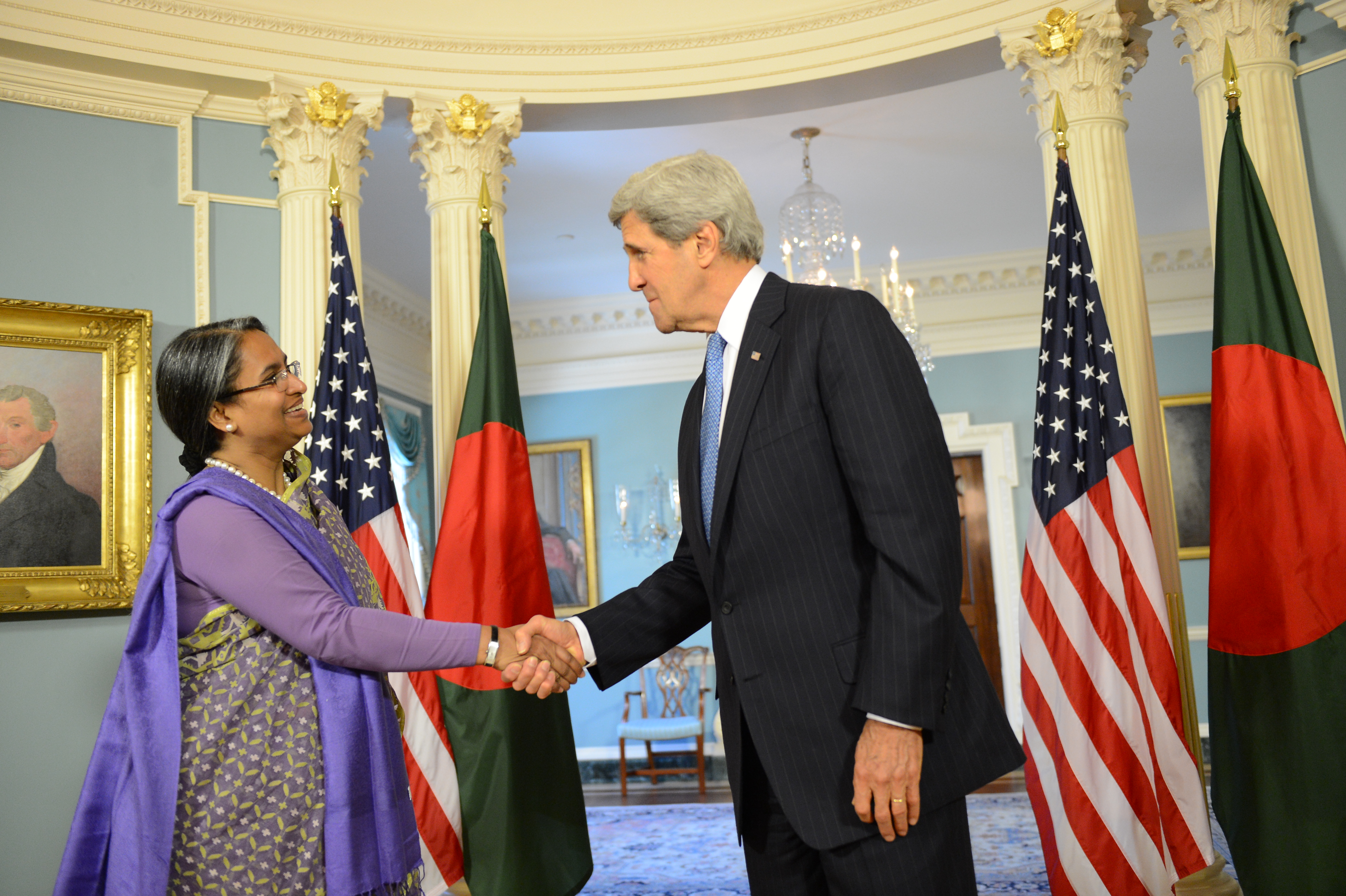

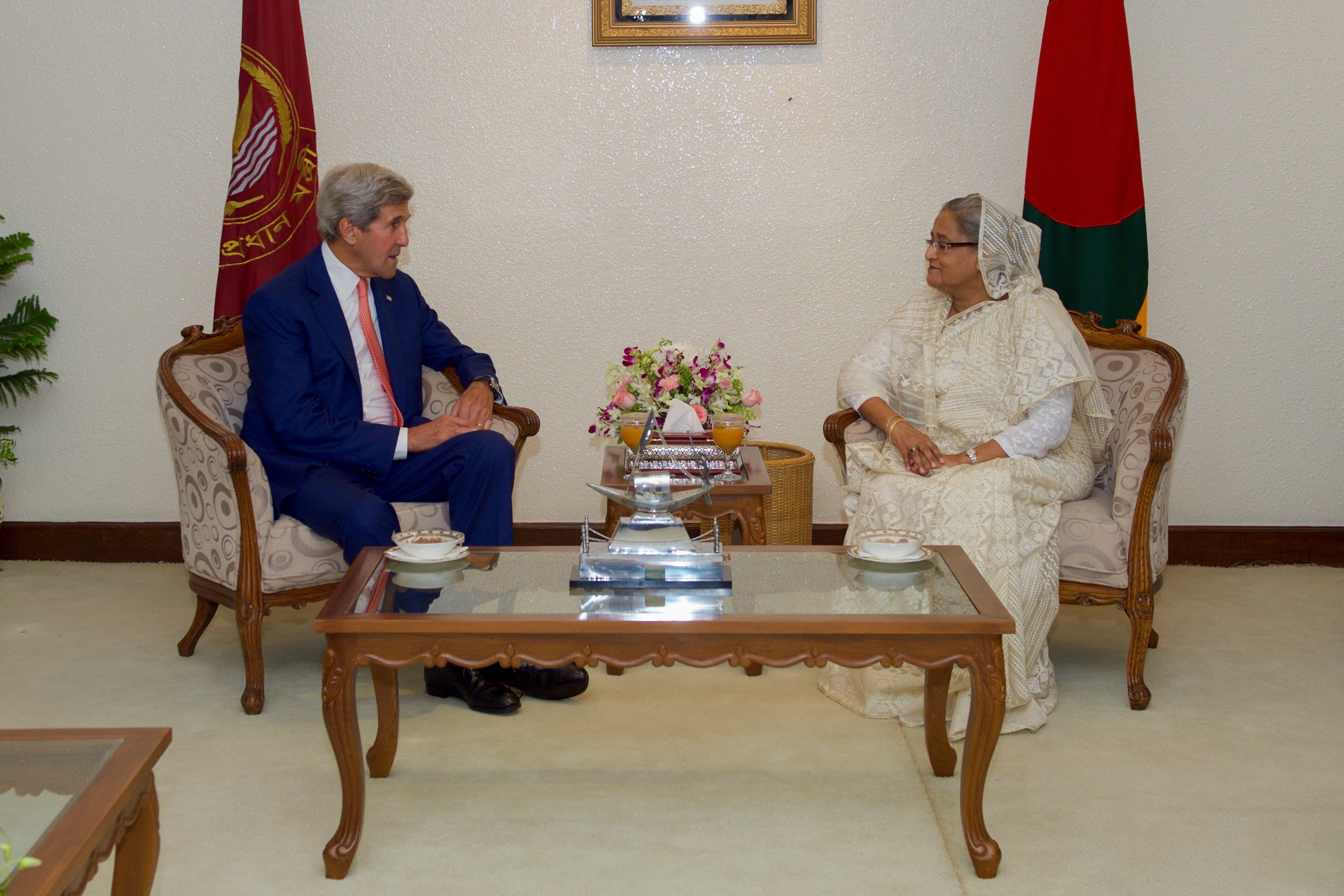

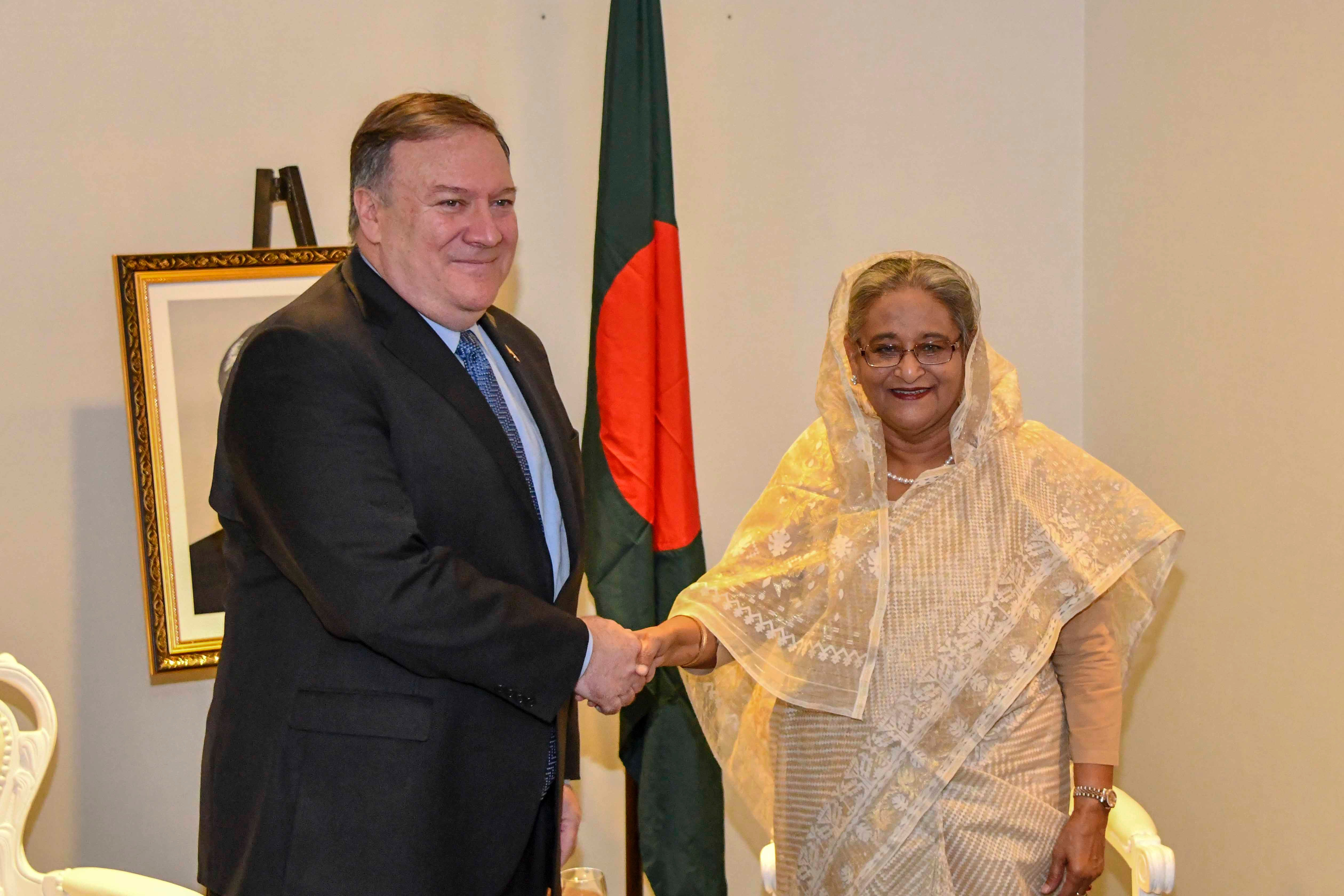

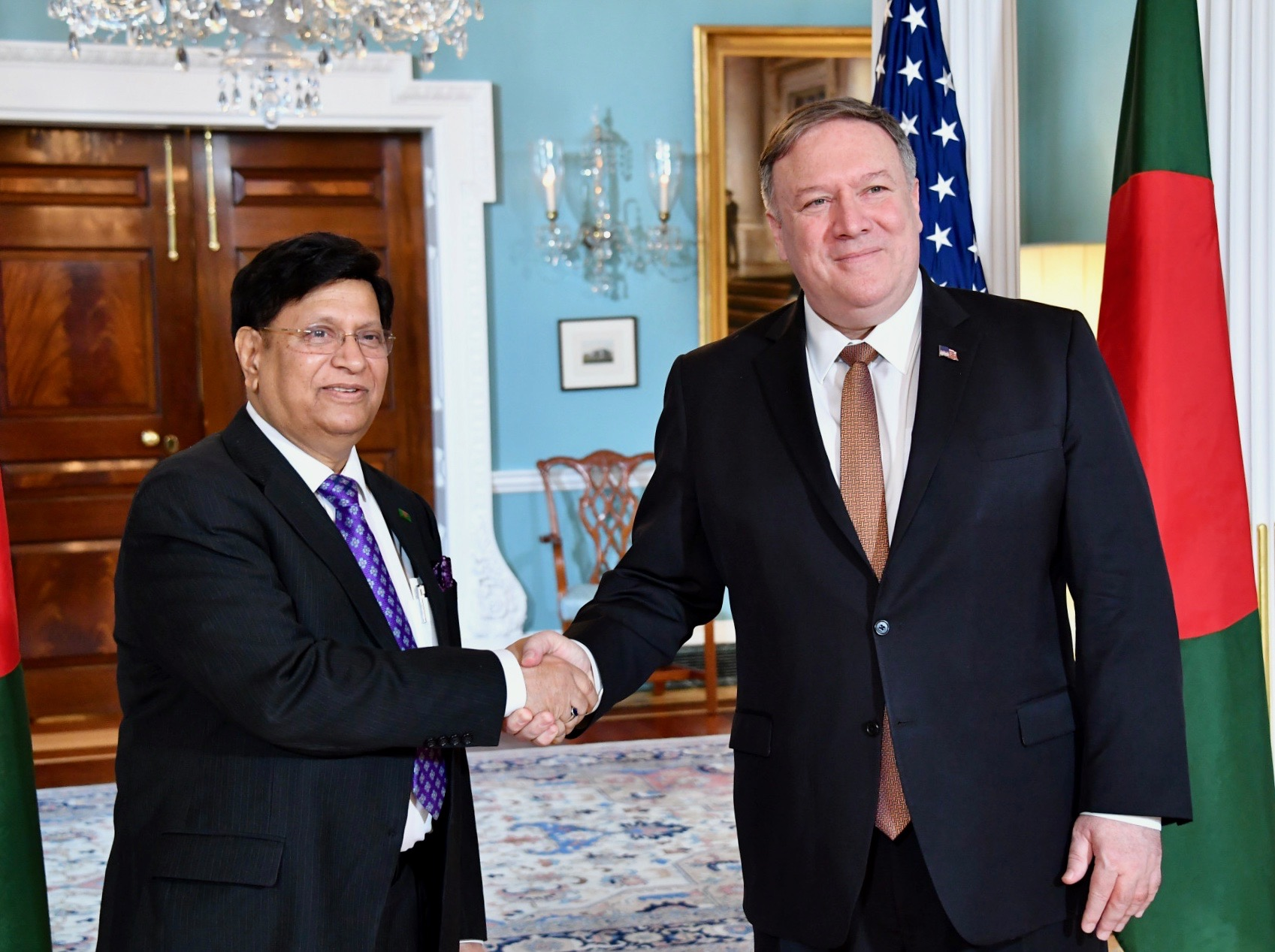

== Brunei ==
Table of Trips
Start	End	Guest	Title	Reason
November 18, 1993	November 20, 1993	Hassanal Bolkiah	Sultan	Attended Asia-Pacific Economic Cooperation meeting in Seattle.
December 15, 2002	December 17, 2002	Hassanal Bolkiah	Sultan	Working visit.
November 10, 2011	November 13, 2011	Hassanal Bolkiah	Sultan	Attended the Asia-Pacific Economic Cooperation Summit at Honolulu and Kapolei, Hawaii.
March 11, 2013	March 12, 2013	Hassanal Bolkiah	Sultan	Working visit.
February 16, 2016	February 18, 2016	Hassanal Bolkiah	Sultan	Attended the ASEAN Leaders Summit at Sunnylands, California.
May 12, 2022	May 13, 2022	Hassanal Bolkiah	Sultan	Attended the U.S.-ASEAN Summit.
November 12, 2023	November 17, 2023	Hassanal Bolkiah	Sultan	Attended the APEC Leaders' Summit at San Francisco, CA.

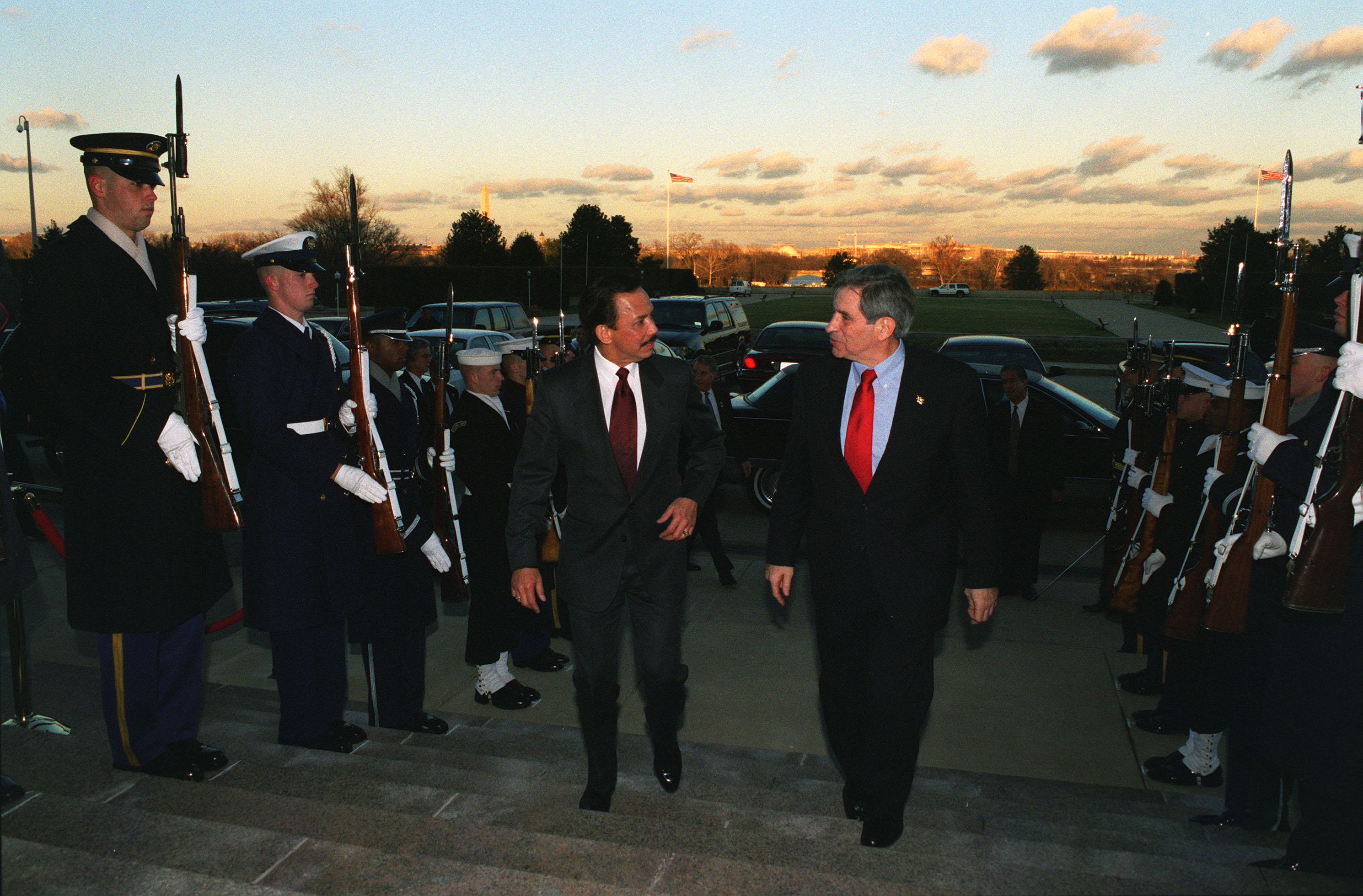

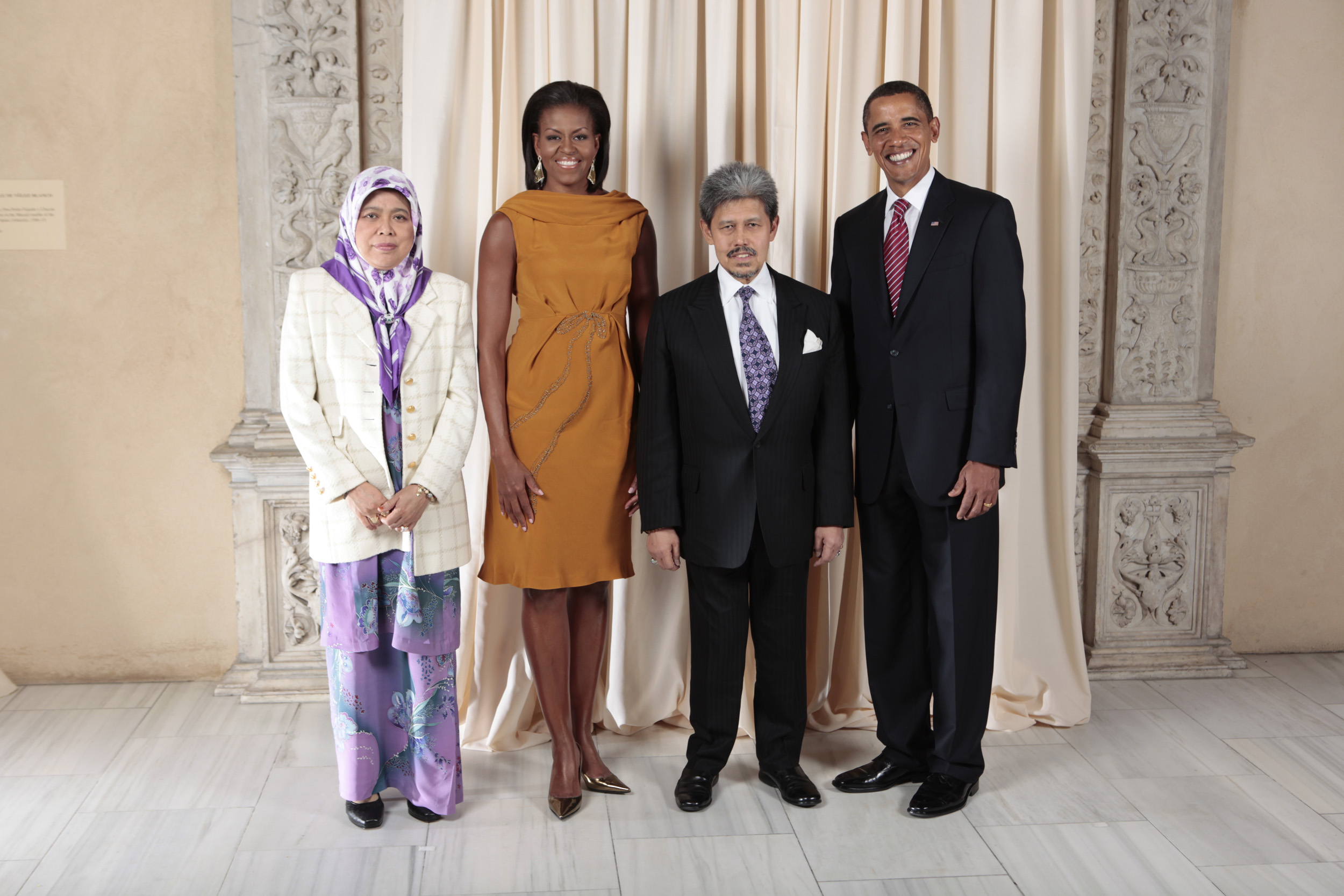

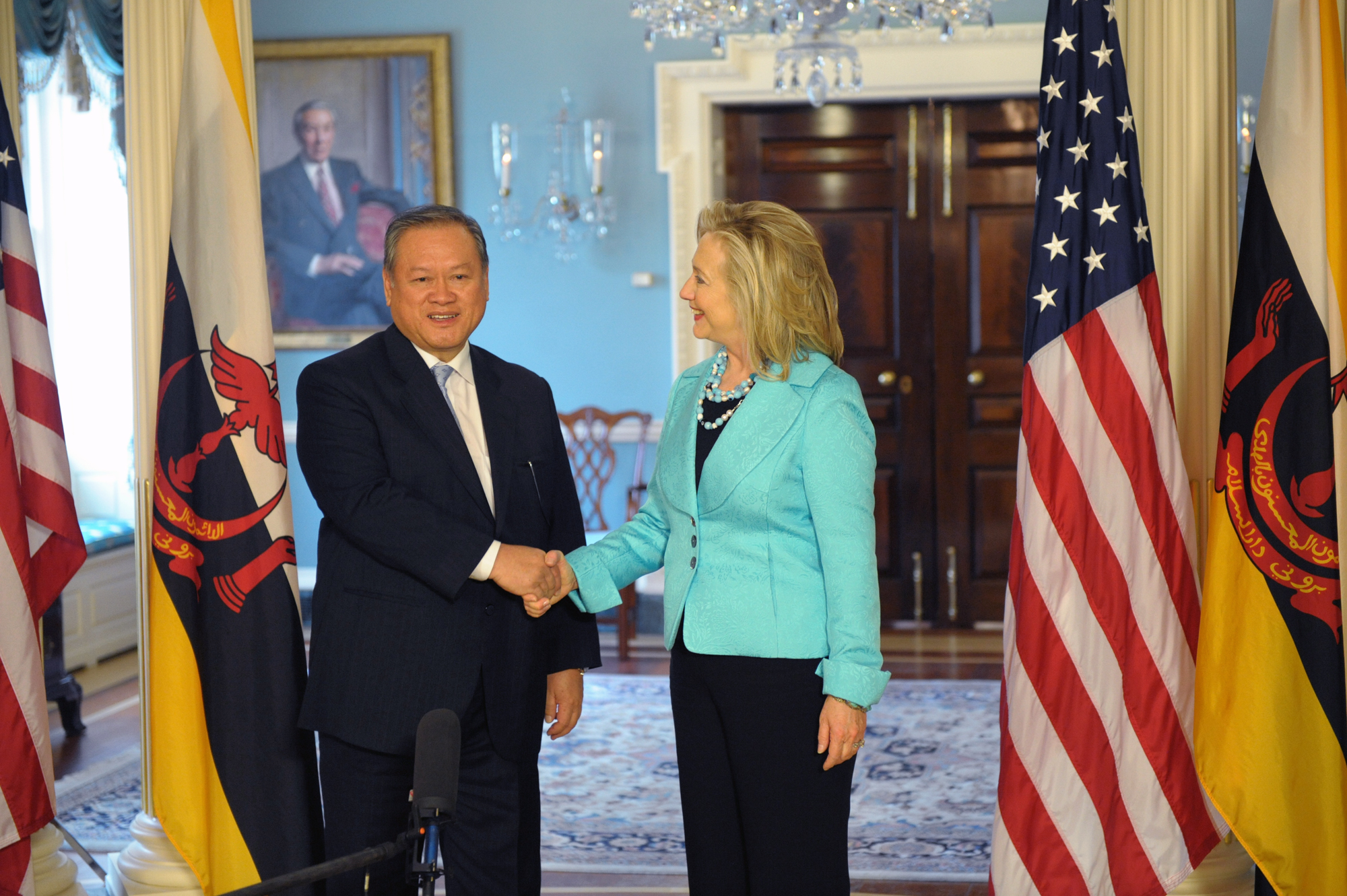

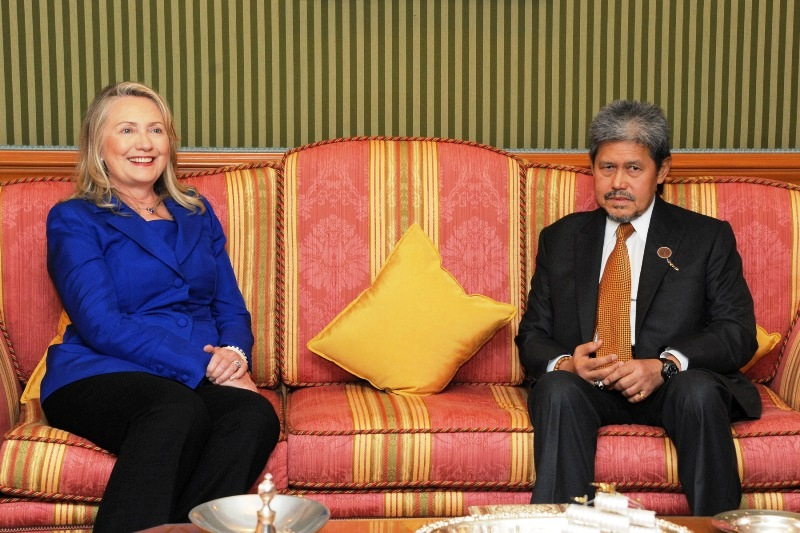

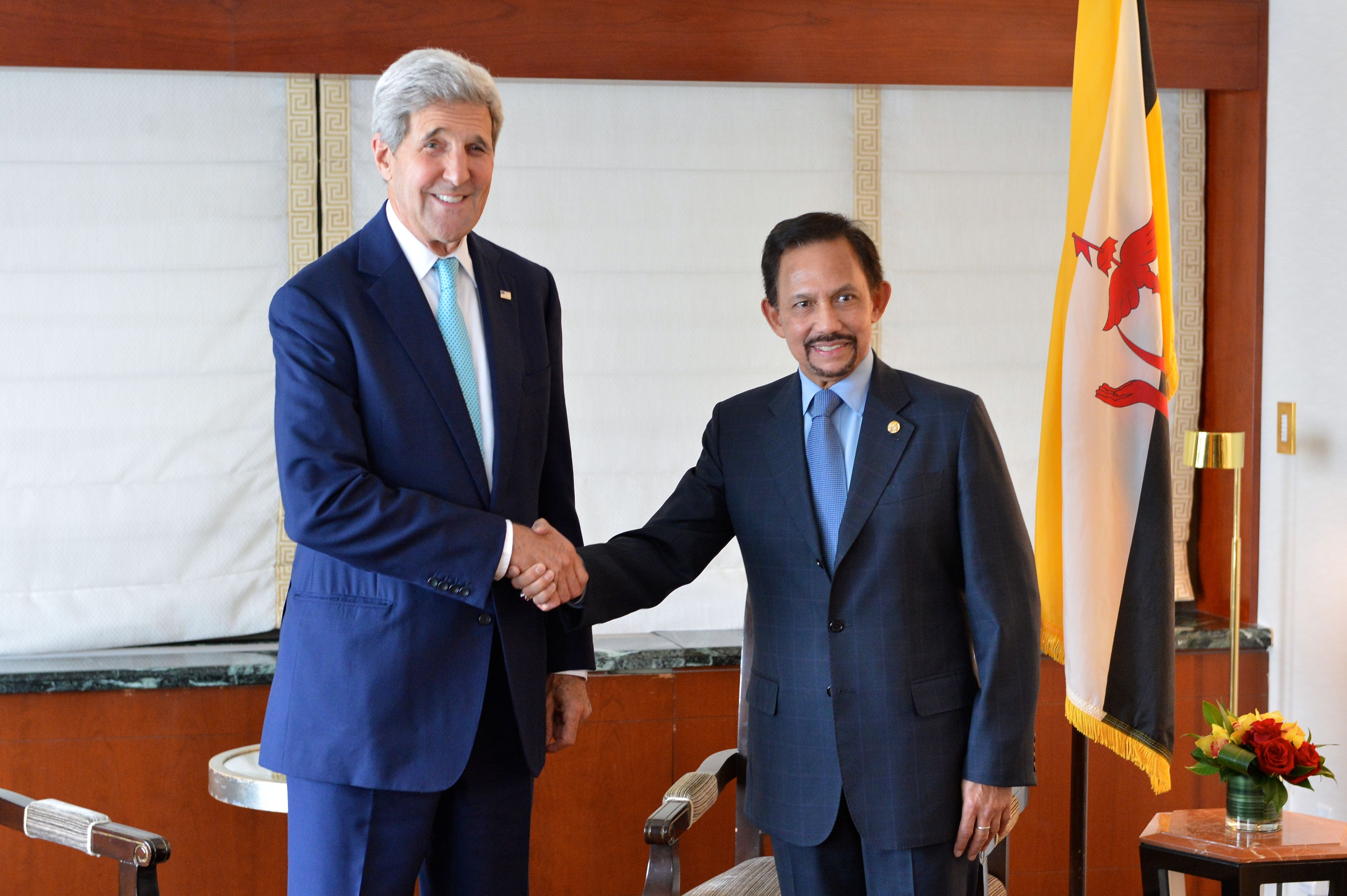

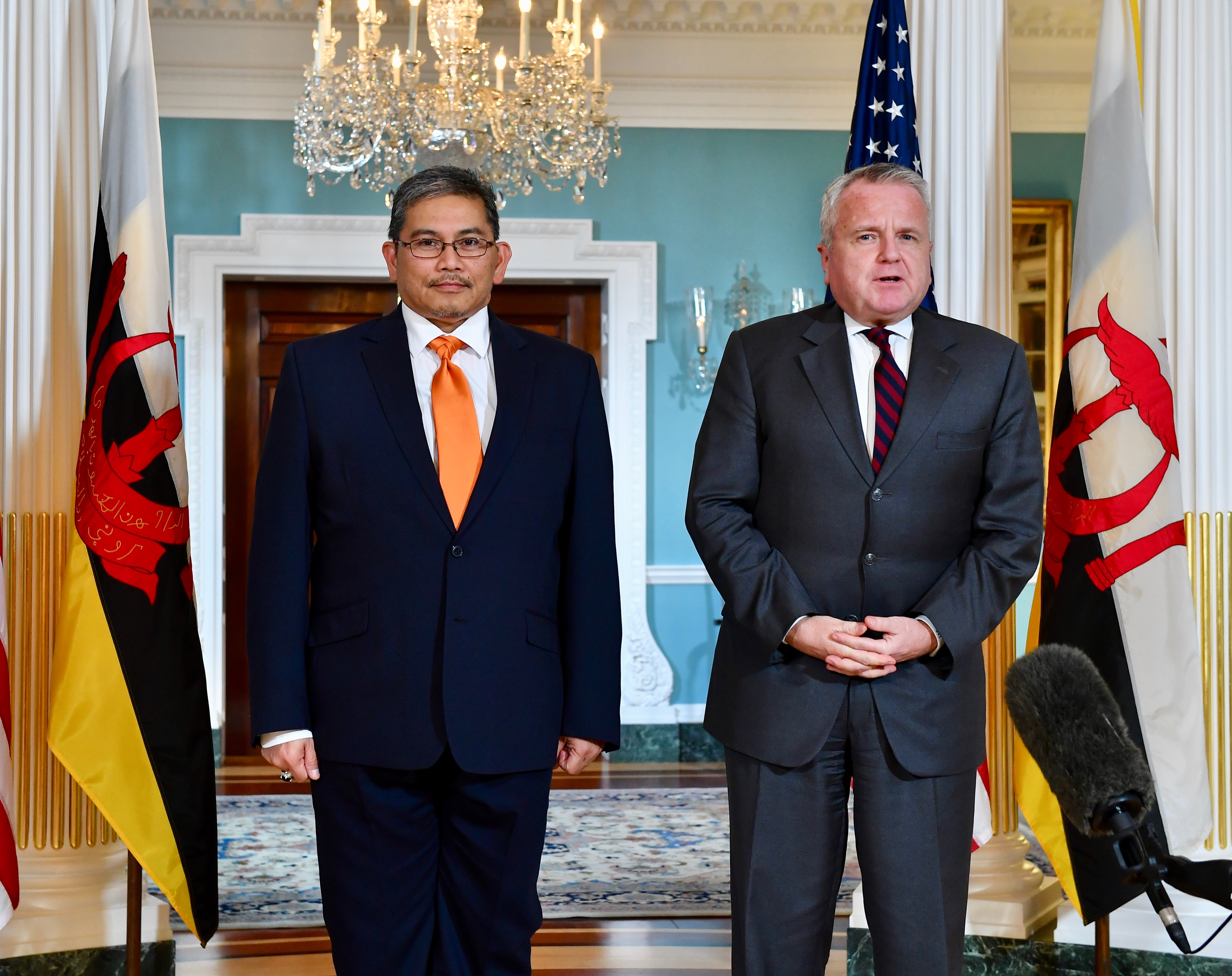

== Cambodia ==
Table of Trips
Start	End	Guest	Title	Reason
April 17, 1953	April 17, 1953	Norodom Sihanouk	King	En route from Europe to Cambodia; visited New York City and San Francisco. Departed U.S.April 21.
September 28, 1958	October 3, 1958	Norodom Sihanouk	Premier and Prince	Unofficial visit to Washington, D.C. while attending UN General Assembly.Arrived in U.S.September 12.
September 27, 1960	September 27, 1960	Norodom Sihanouk	Premier and Prince	Met with President Eisenhower in New York City while attending UN General Assembly session.
September 25, 1961	September 25, 1961	Norodom Sihanouk	Prince	Met with President Kennedy in New York City while attending UN General Assembly session.
November 24, 1963	November 25, 1963	Norodom Sihanouk	Premier and Prince	Attended Funeral of President Kennedy
October 24, 1970	October 25, 1970	Cheng Heng	President	Attended White House dinner on 25th Anniversary of the UN; met privately with President Nixon October 25.
August 10, 1971	August 11, 1971	Sisowath Sirik Matak	Prime Minister	Official visit.
October 11, 1988	October 11. 1988	King Sihanouk	Prime Minister	Met with President Reagan at the White House
February 16, 2016	February 18, 2016	Hun Sen	Prime Minister	Attended the ASEAN Leaders Summit at Sunnylands, California
May 12, 2022	May 13, 2022	Hun Sen	Prime Minister	Attended the U.S.-ASEAN Summit.

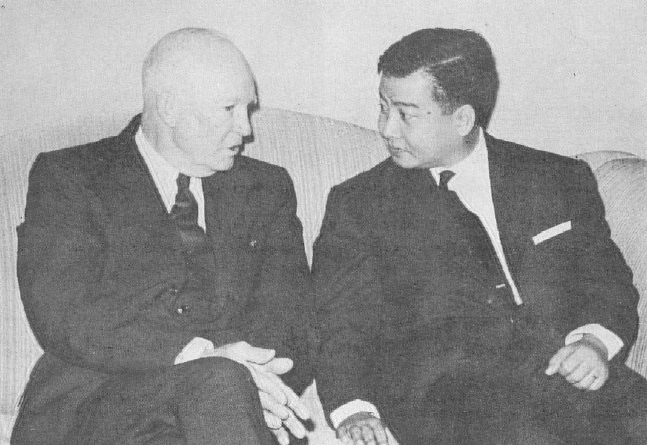

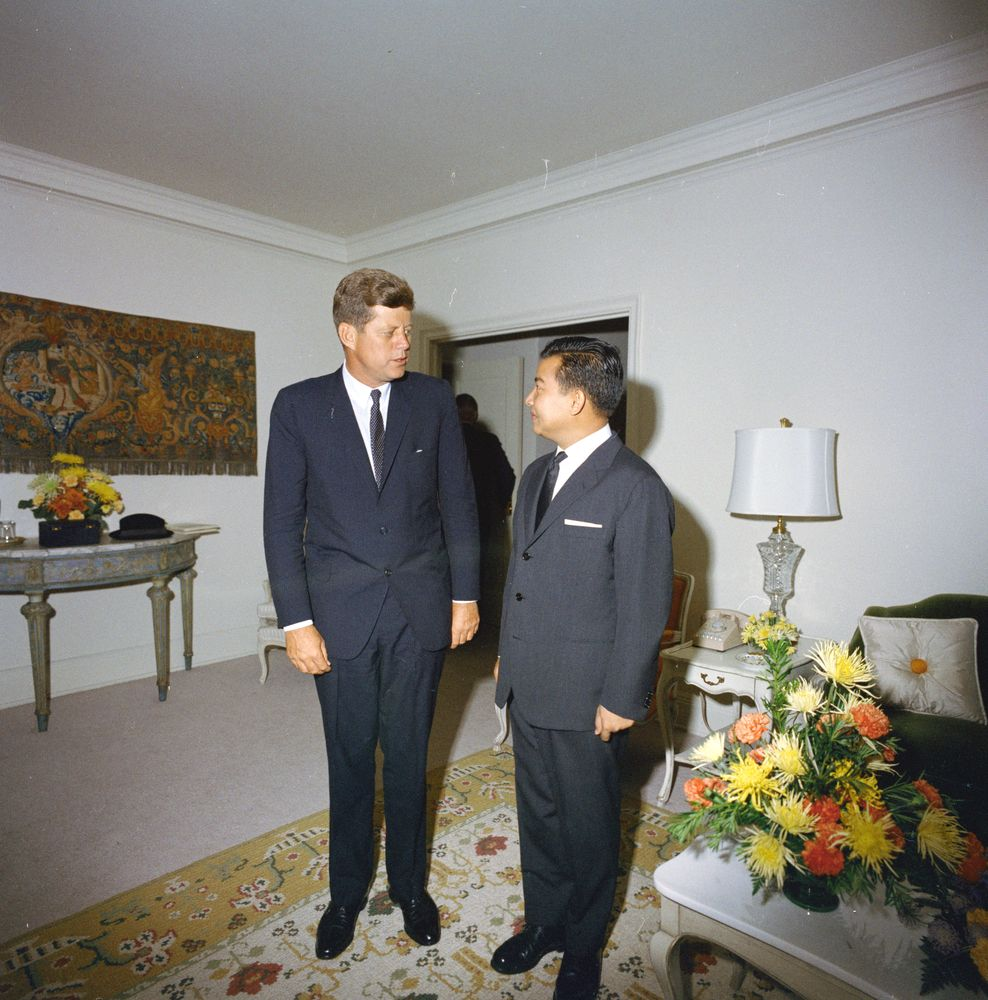

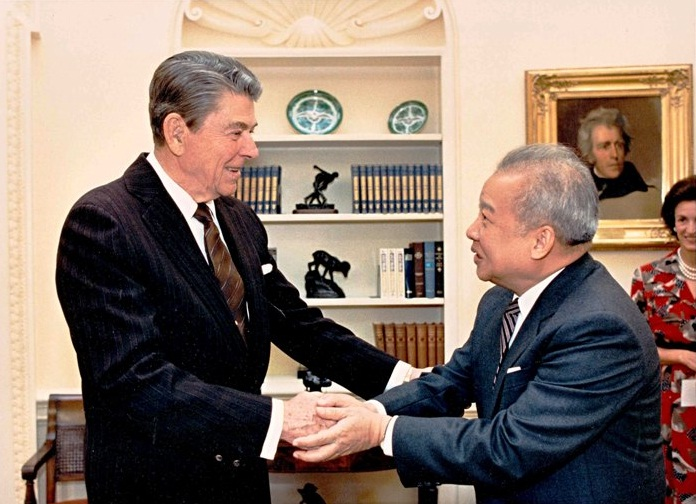

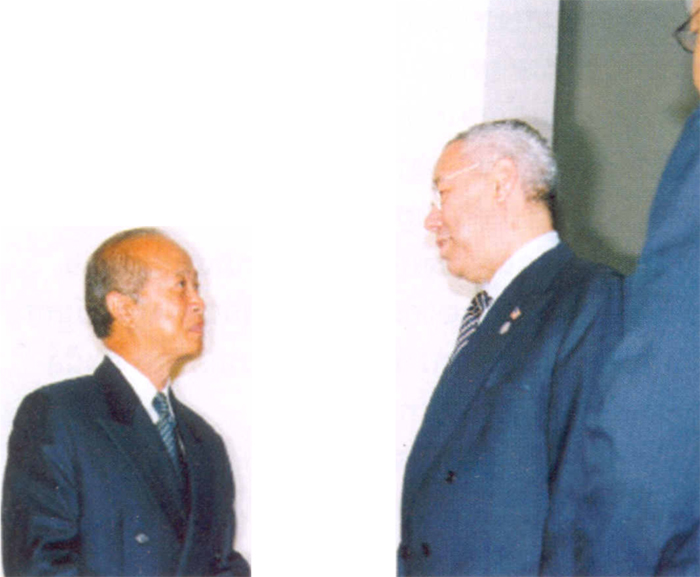

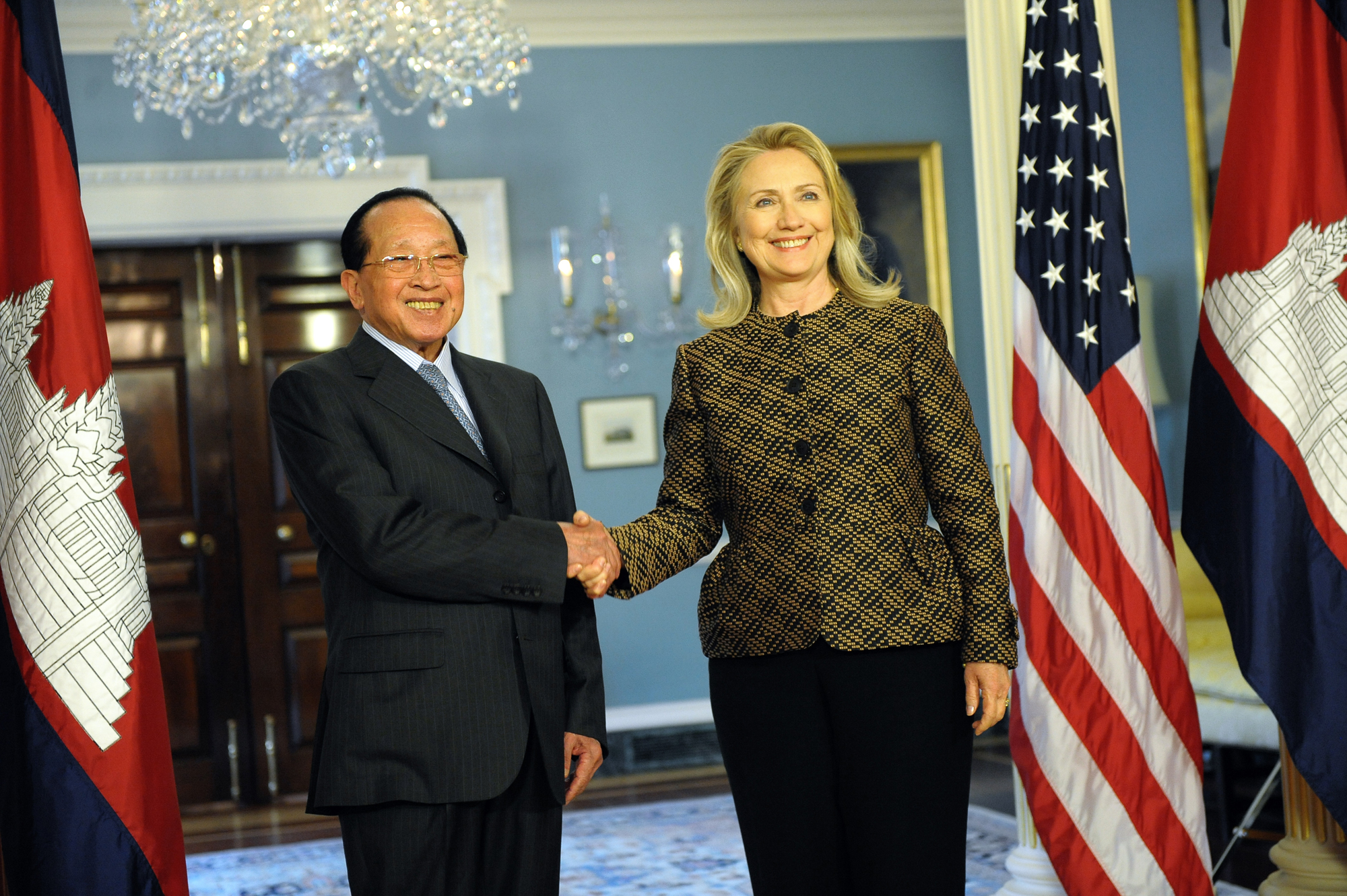

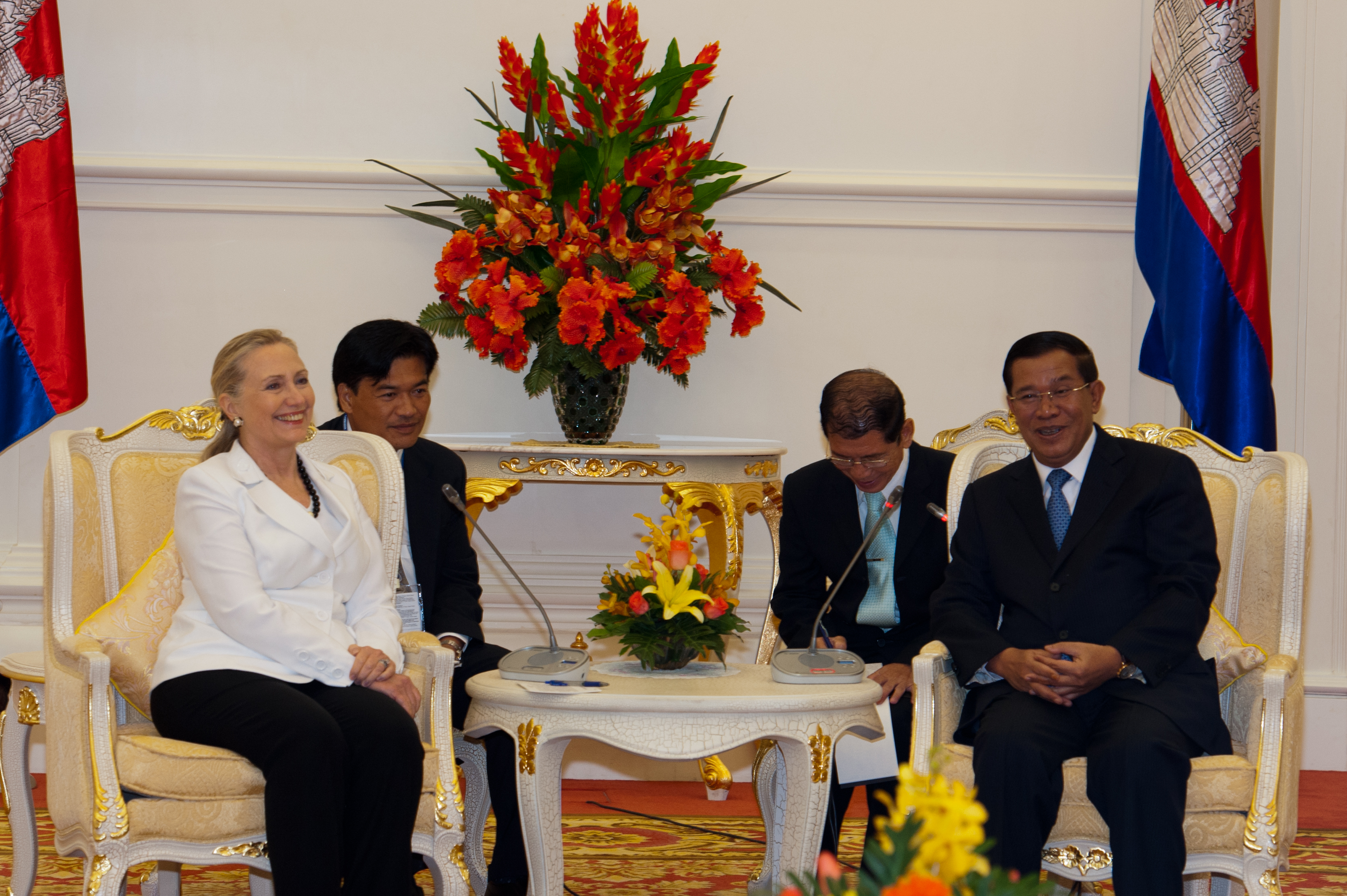

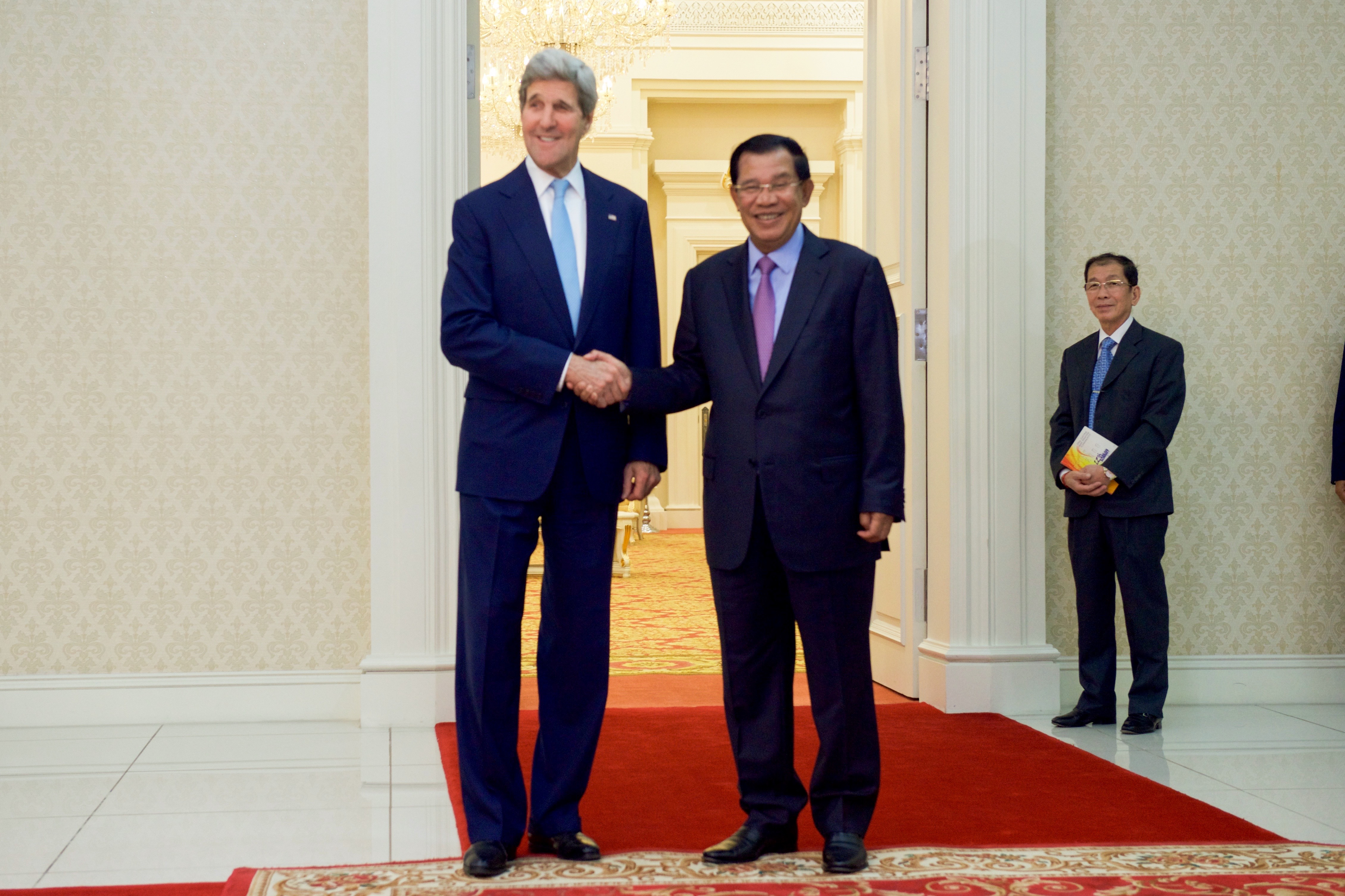

== China ==
Note: The United States recognized the Republic of China until 1979 when it established diplomatic relations with the People's Republic of China.

Table of Trips
Start	End	Guest	Title	Reason
April 26, 1945	June 14, 1945	T. V. Soong	Premier	Led Chinese delegation to the United Nations Conference in San Francisco.As Foreign Minister, had met with U.S.officials in Washington, D.C., April 17–23.
July 31, 1961	August 3, 1961	Chen Cheng	Premier	Official visit. In U.S. July 29 – August 10, visiting Honolulu, San Francisco, Williamsburg, New York City, Knoxville, Chicago, and Detroit.
May 9, 1967	May 11, 1967	Yen Chia-kan	Premier	Official visit. In U.S. May 7–25; visited San Francisco, Williamsburg, Cape Kennedy, Houston, New York City, Seattle, San Francisco, Los Angeles, and Honolulu.
October 24, 1970	October 25, 1970	Yen Chia-kan	Premier	Attended White House dinner on 25th Anniversary of the UN; met privately with President Nixon October 25.
January 29, 1979	February 5, 1979	Deng Xiaoping	Vice Premier	State visit. Met with President Carter and attended a State Dinner. Also traveled to Atlanta, Houston, Seattle, and Los Angeles during his visit.
January 10, 1984	January 12, 1984	Zhao Ziyang	Premier	Official visit. In U.S.January 7–16; visited Honolulu, Hawaii, Williamsburg, San Francisco, and New York City.
July 22, 1985	July 25, 1985	Li Xiannian	President	State Visit. In U.S.July 21–31; visited Niagara Falls, Chicago, Los Angeles, and Honolulu, Hawaii.
January 31, 1992	January 31, 1992	Li Peng	Premier	Met with President Bush during a UN Security Council Summit in New York City.
November 18, 1993	November 21, 1993	Jiang Zemin	CCP General Secretary; President	Attended Asia-Pacific Economic Cooperation meeting in Seattle.
October 24, 1995	October 24, 1995	Jiang Zemin	CCP General Secretary; President	Met with President Clinton at the UN General Assembly in New York City.
October 28, 1997	October 30, 1997	Jiang Zemin	CCP General Secretary; President	State Visit. Arrived in U.S. October 26, visiting Honolulu, Hawaii and Williamsburg.Afterwards visited Philadelphia, New York City, Boston, and Los Angeles. Departed the U.S.Nov.3.
April 7, 1999	April 10, 1999	Zhu Rongji	Premier	Official visit. Arrived in Los Angeles April 6. Later visited Denver, Chicago, Libertyville, New York City, and Boston. Departed the U.S. April 14.
September 7, 2000	September 8, 2000	Jiang Zemin	CCP General Secretary; President	Met with President Clinton at the UN Millennium Summit in New York City.
October 22, 2002	October 25, 2002	Jiang Zemin	CCP General Secretary; President	Official Working visit. Met with President Bush at Crawford Ranch. Arrived in the U.S.October 22; also visited Chicago and Houston.
December 9, 2003	December 9, 2003	Wen Jiabao	Premier	Official visit.
September 13, 2005	September 13, 2005	Hu Jintao	CCP General Secretary; President	Met with President Bush at the UN General Assembly in New York City.
April 20, 2006	April 21, 2006	Hu Jintao	CCP General Secretary; President	Official visit. Arrived in Seattle April 18. Visited New Haven April 21.
November 14, 2008	November 15, 2008	Hu Jintao	CCP General Secretary; President	Attended the G-20 Economic Summit meeting.
September 22, 2009	September 22, 2009	Hu Jintao	CCP General Secretary; President	Met with President Obama at the UN General Assembly in New York City.
September 24, 2009	September 25, 2009	Hu Jintao	CCP General Secretary; President	Attended the G-20 Economic Summit meeting in Pittsburgh
April 12, 2010	April 13, 2010	Hu Jintao	CCP General Secretary; President	Attended the Nuclear Security Summit
September 23, 2010	September 23, 2010	Wen Jiabao	Premier	Met with President Obama at the UN General Assembly in New York City.
January 18, 2011	January 20, 2011	Hu Jintao	CCP General Secretary; President	State Visit. Also visited Chicago, Illinois on January 20–21.
November 10, 2011	November 13, 2011	Hu Jintao	CCP General Secretary; President	Attended the Asia-Pacific Economic Cooperation Summit at Honolulu and Kapolei, Hawaii.
June 7, 2013	June 8, 2013	Xi Jinping	CCP General Secretary; President	Met with President Obama at Rancho Mirage.
September 24, 2015	September 25, 2015	Xi Jinping	CCP General Secretary; President	State visit.
March 31, 2016	April 1, 2016	Xi Jinping	CCP General Secretary; President	Attended the Nuclear Security Summit.
September 19, 2016	September 19, 2016	Li Keqiang	Premier	Met with President Obama at the UN General Assembly in New York City.
April 6, 2017	April 7, 2017	Xi Jinping	CCP General Secretary; President	Met with President Trump at Mar-a-Lago, Florida.
February 22, 2019	February 22, 2019	Liu He	Vice Premier	Bilateral Meeting.
April 4, 2019	April 4, 2019	Liu He	Vice Premier	Bilateral Meeting.
October 11, 2019	October 11, 2019	Liu He	Vice Premier	Bilateral Meeting.
November 12, 2023	November 12, 2023	Xi Jinping	CCP General Secretary; President	Offsite Meeting at Woodside, California
November 12, 2023	November 17, 2023	Xi Jinping	CCP General Secretary; President	Attended the APEC Leaders' Summit at San Francisco, California.
September 23, 2026	September 25, 2026	Xi Jinping	CCP General Secretary; President	State visit.

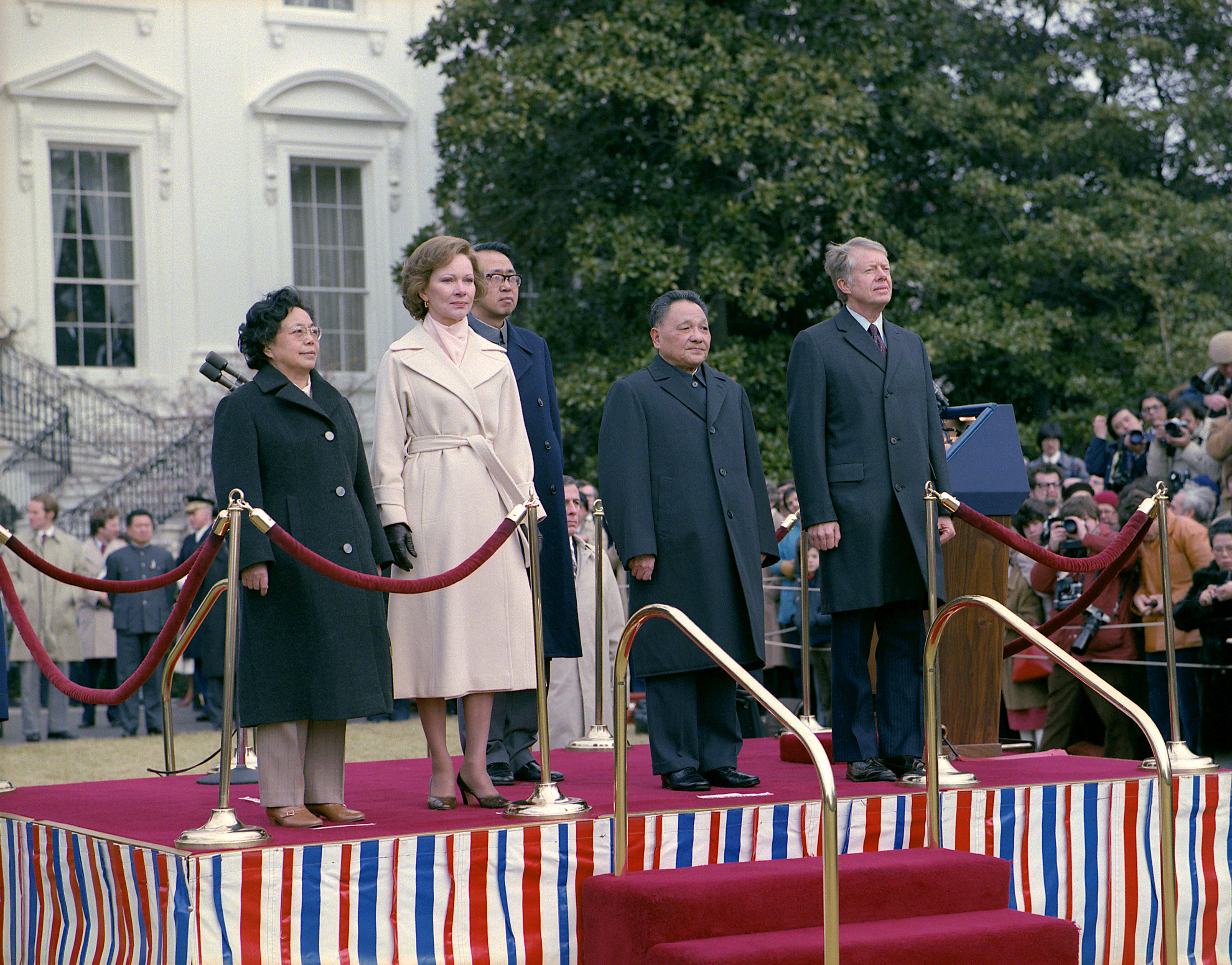

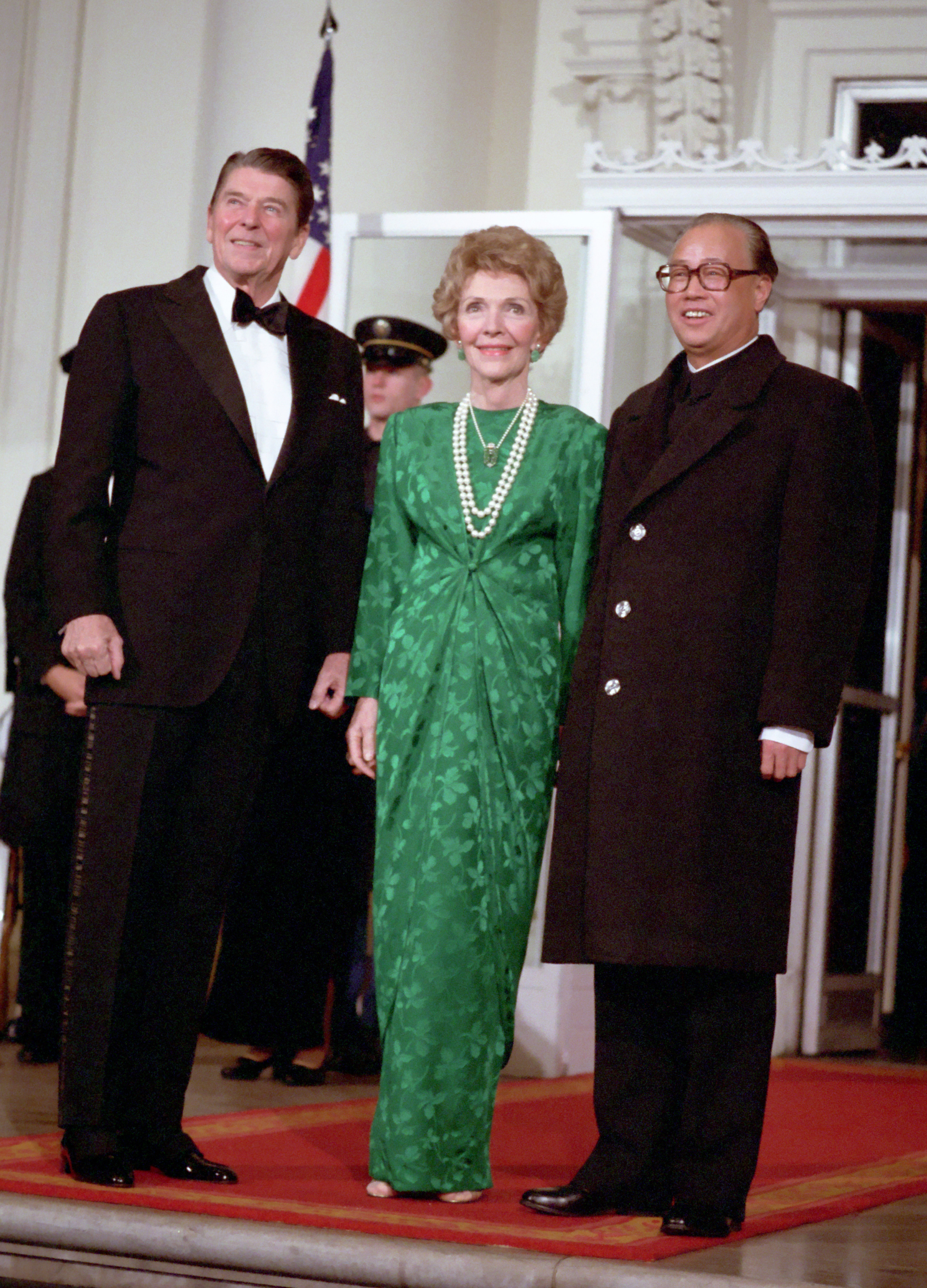

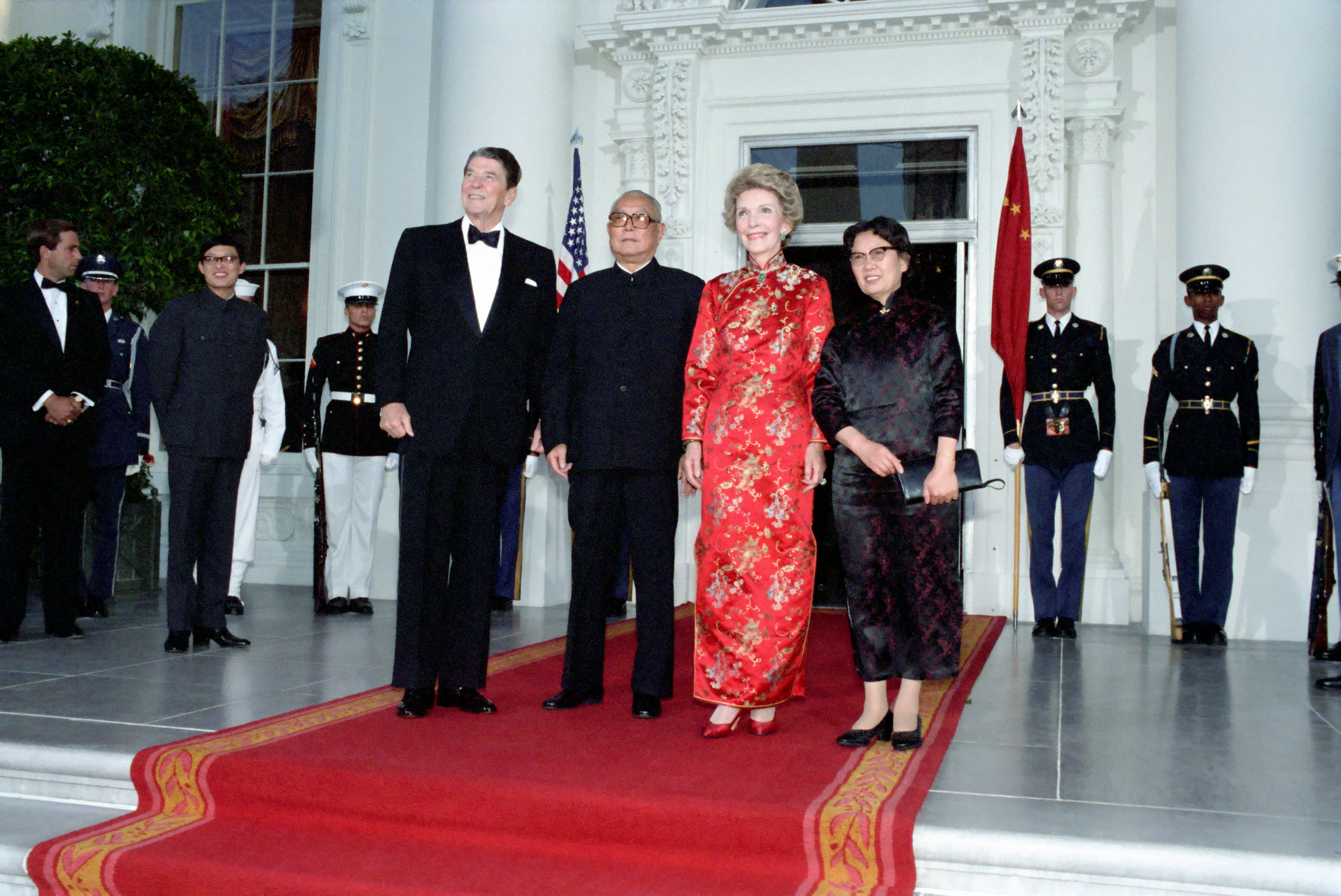

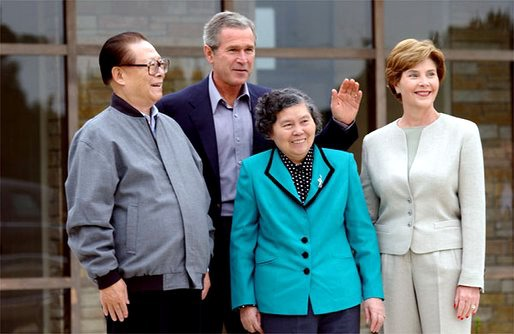

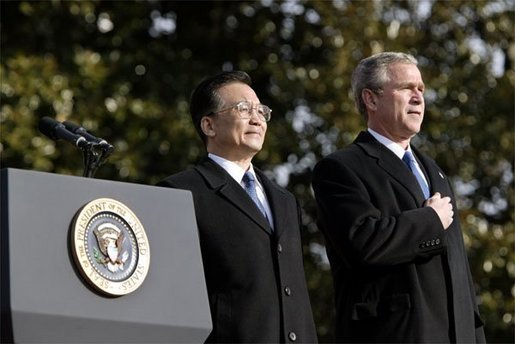

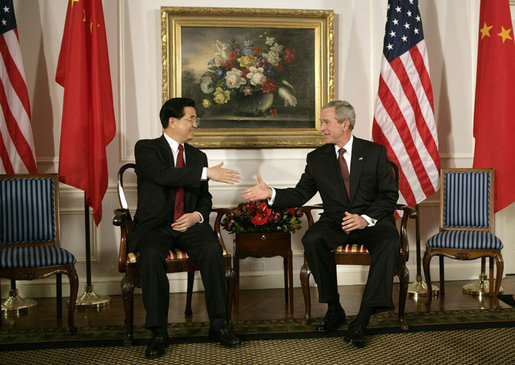

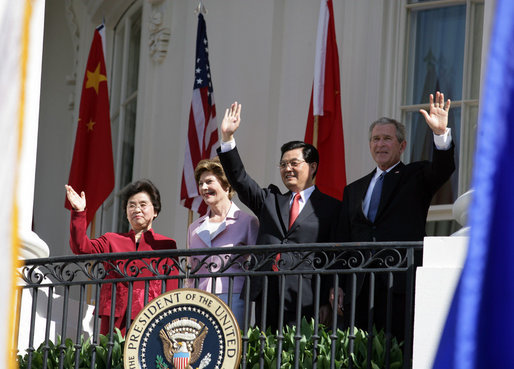

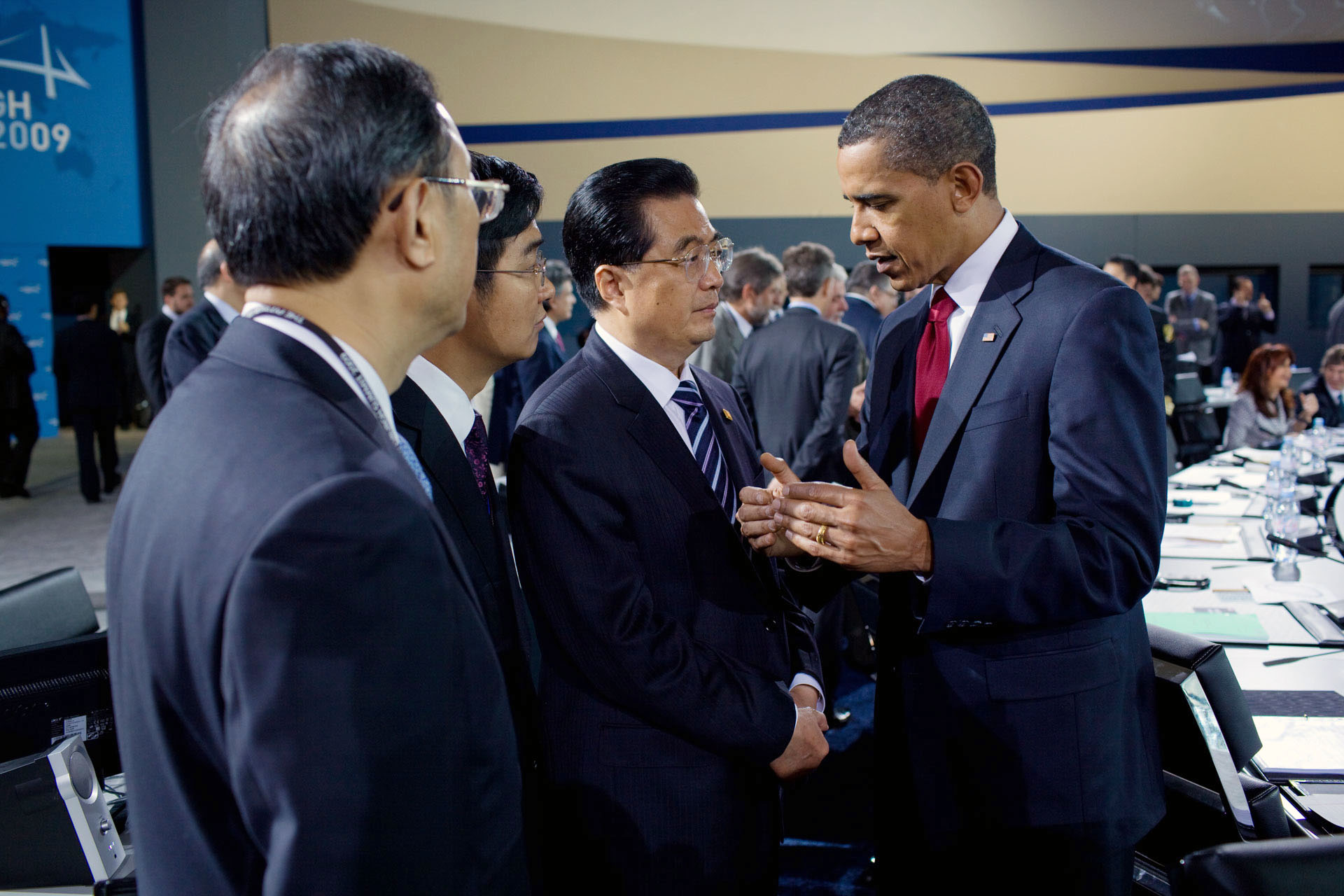

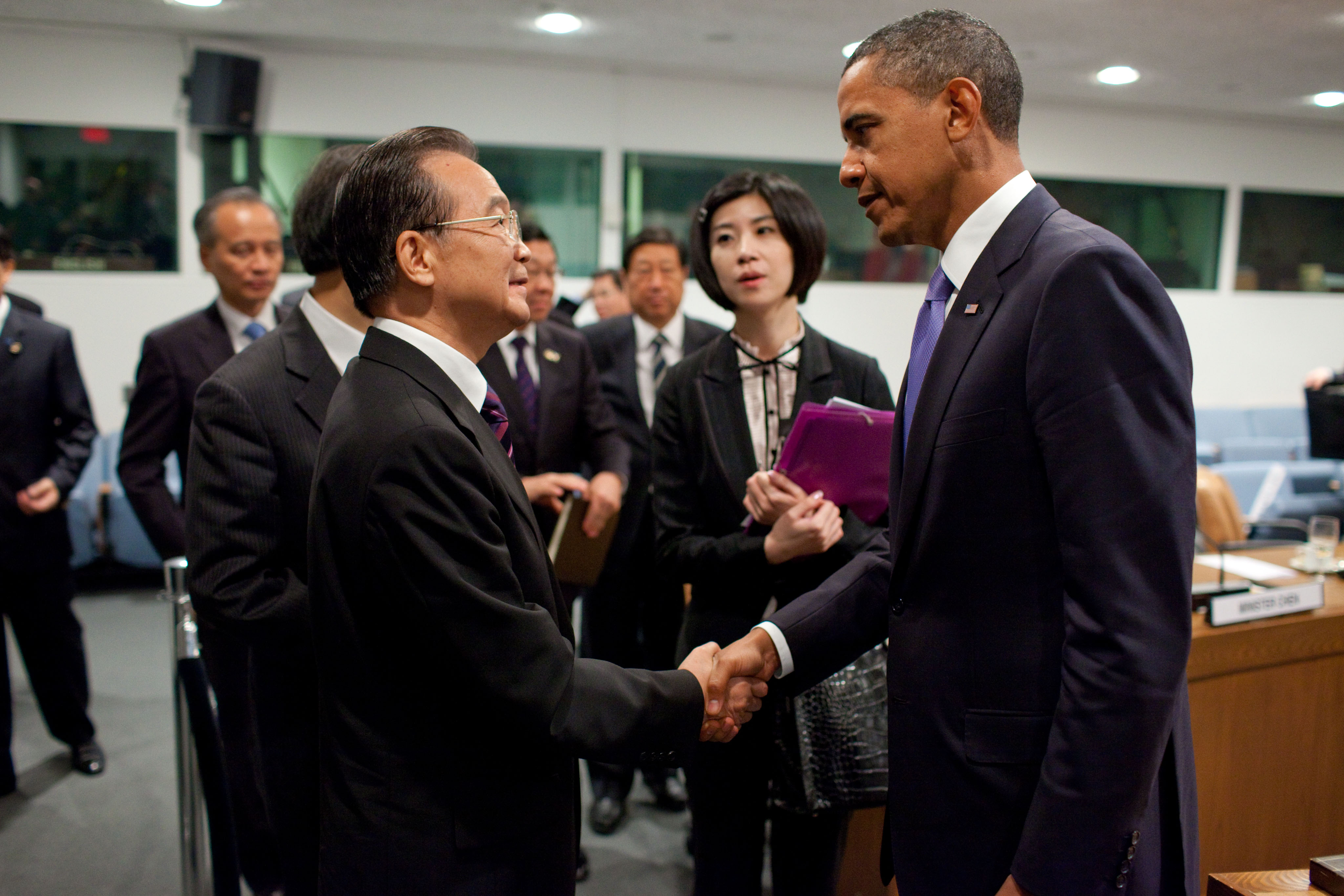

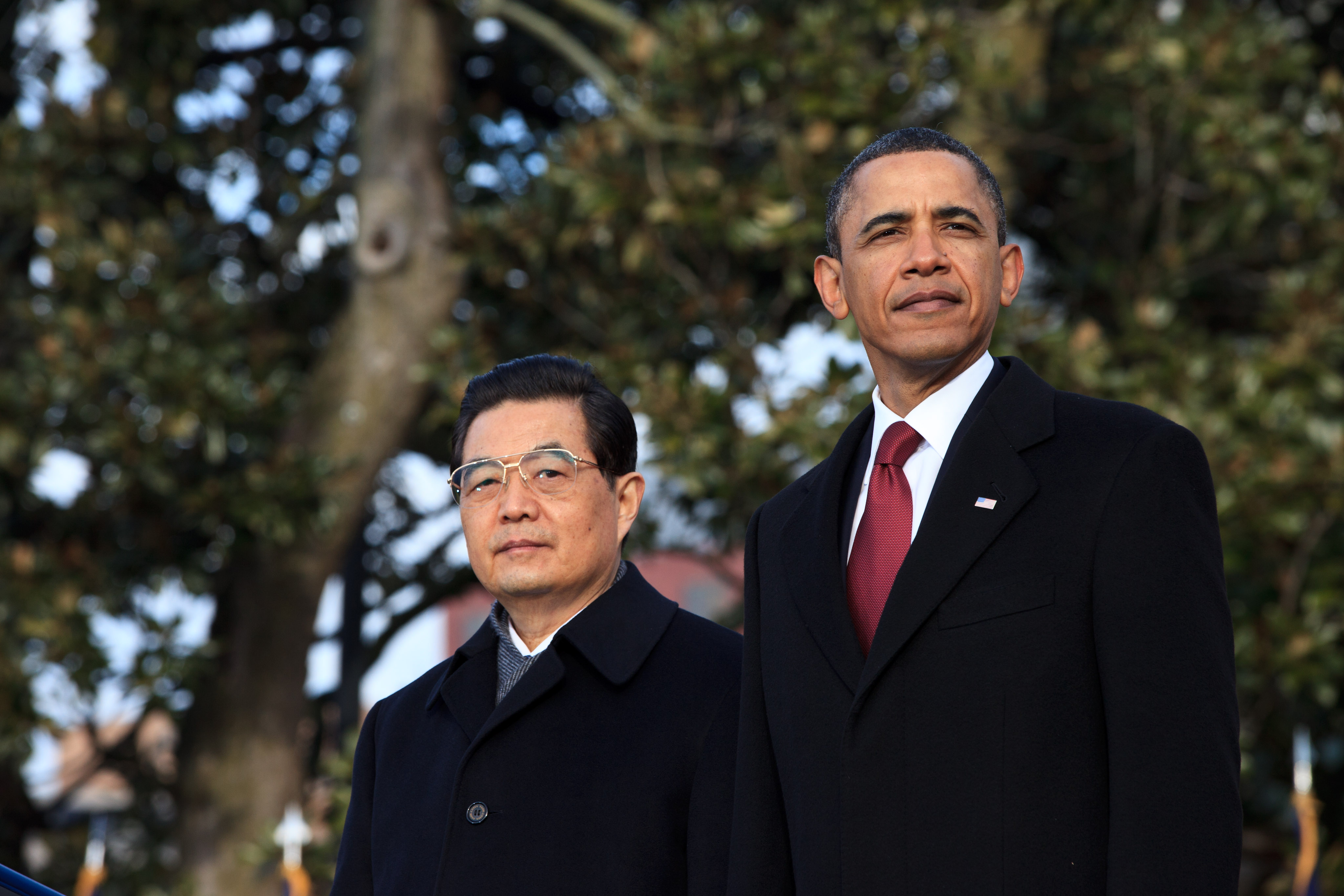

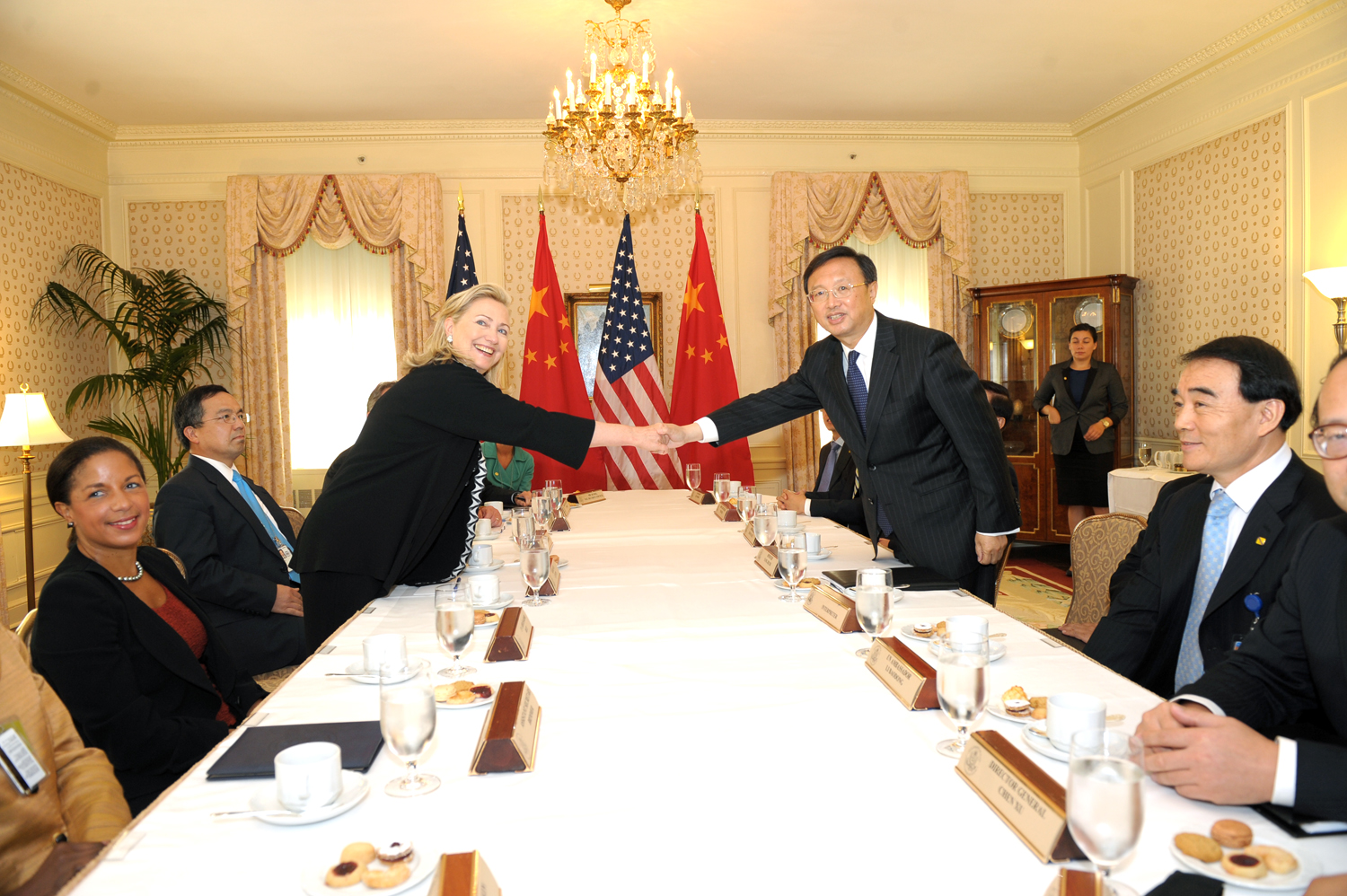

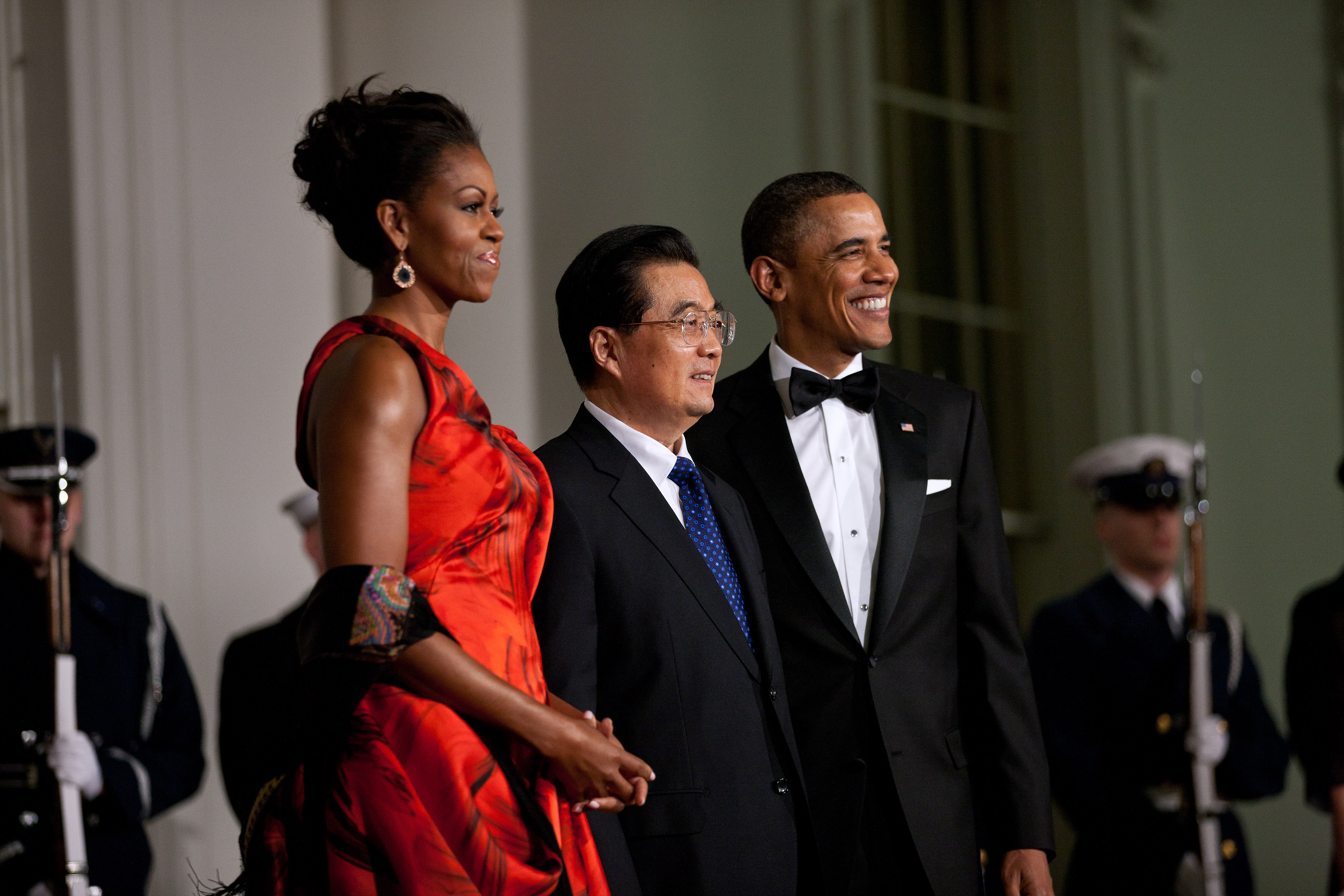

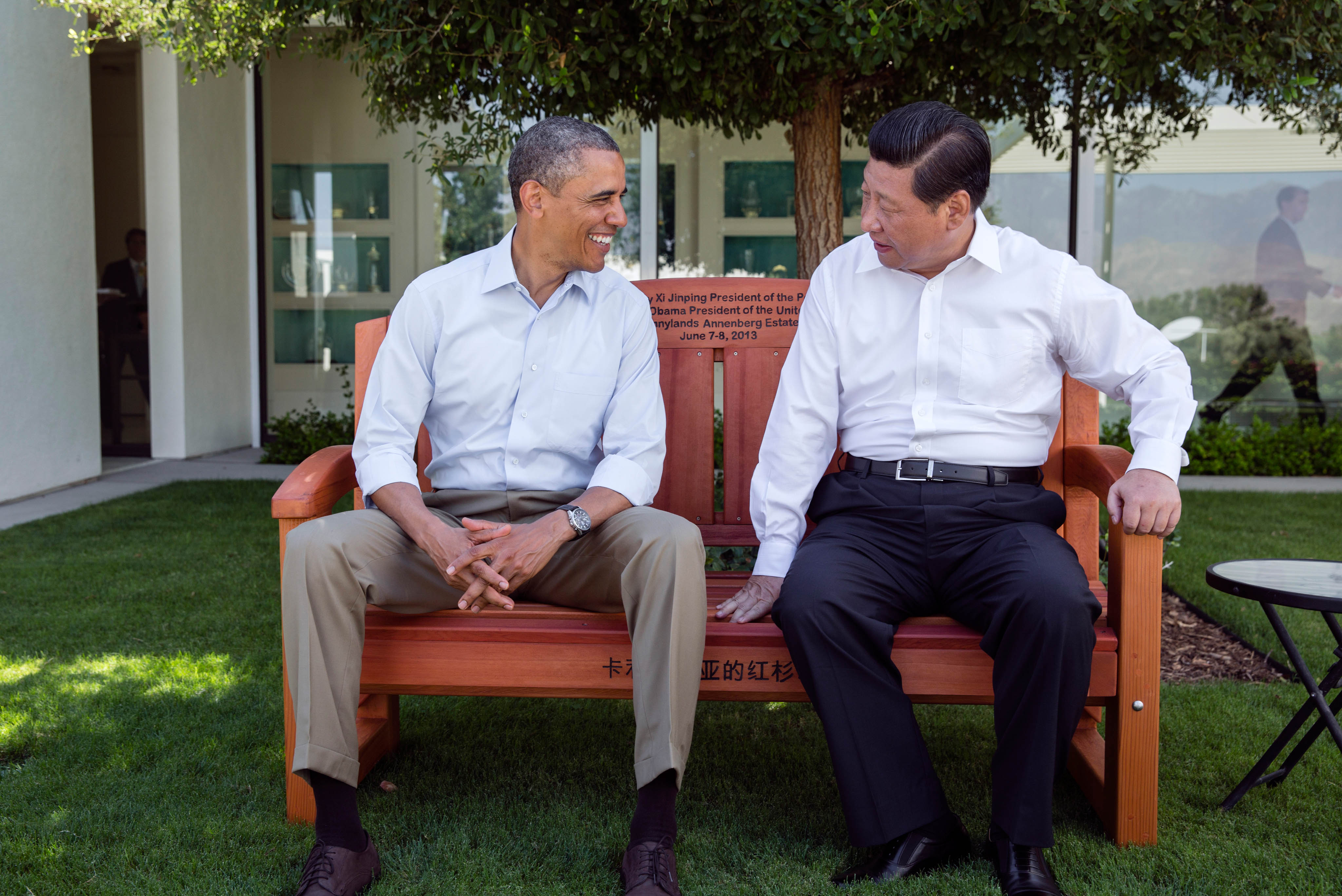

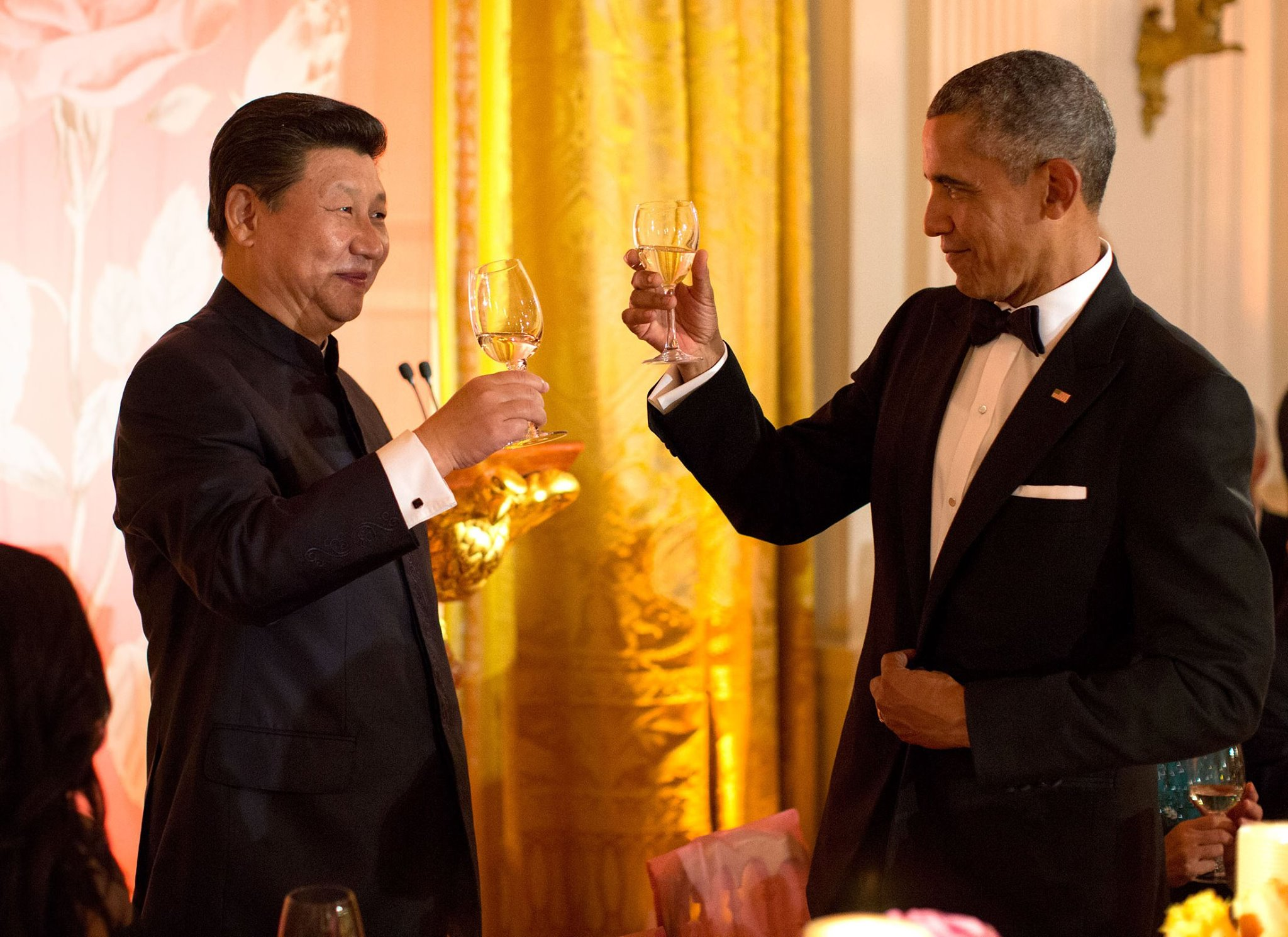

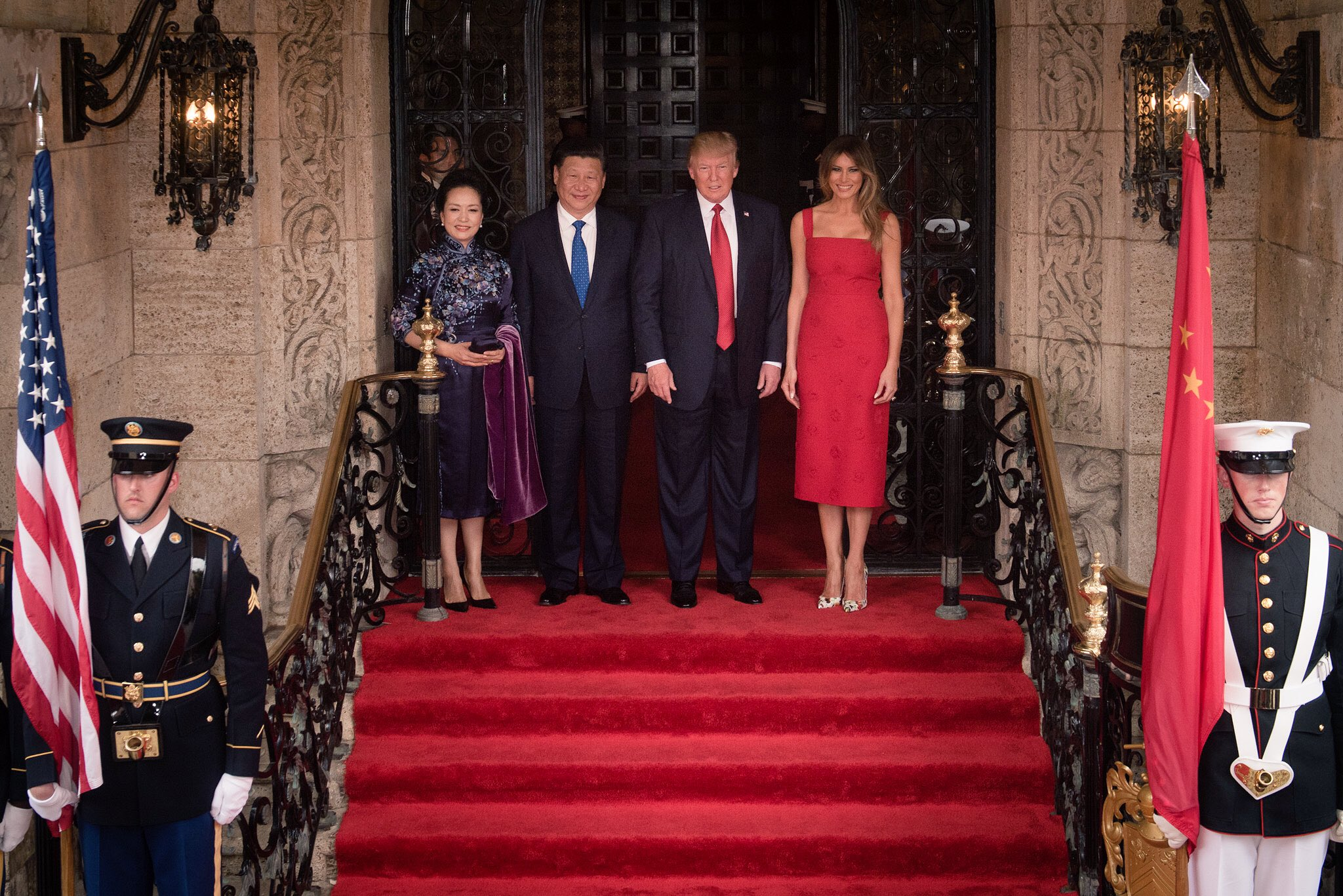

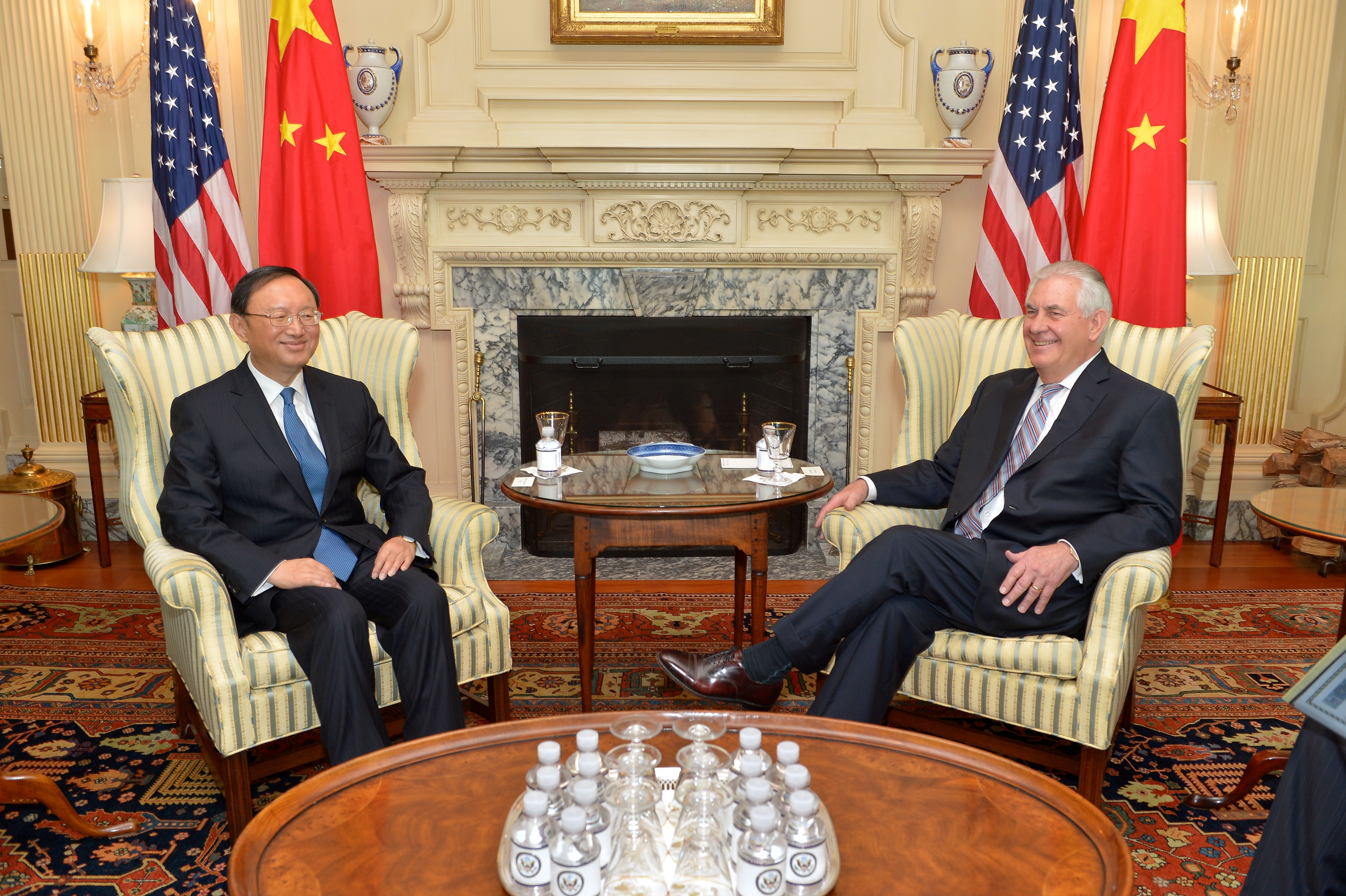

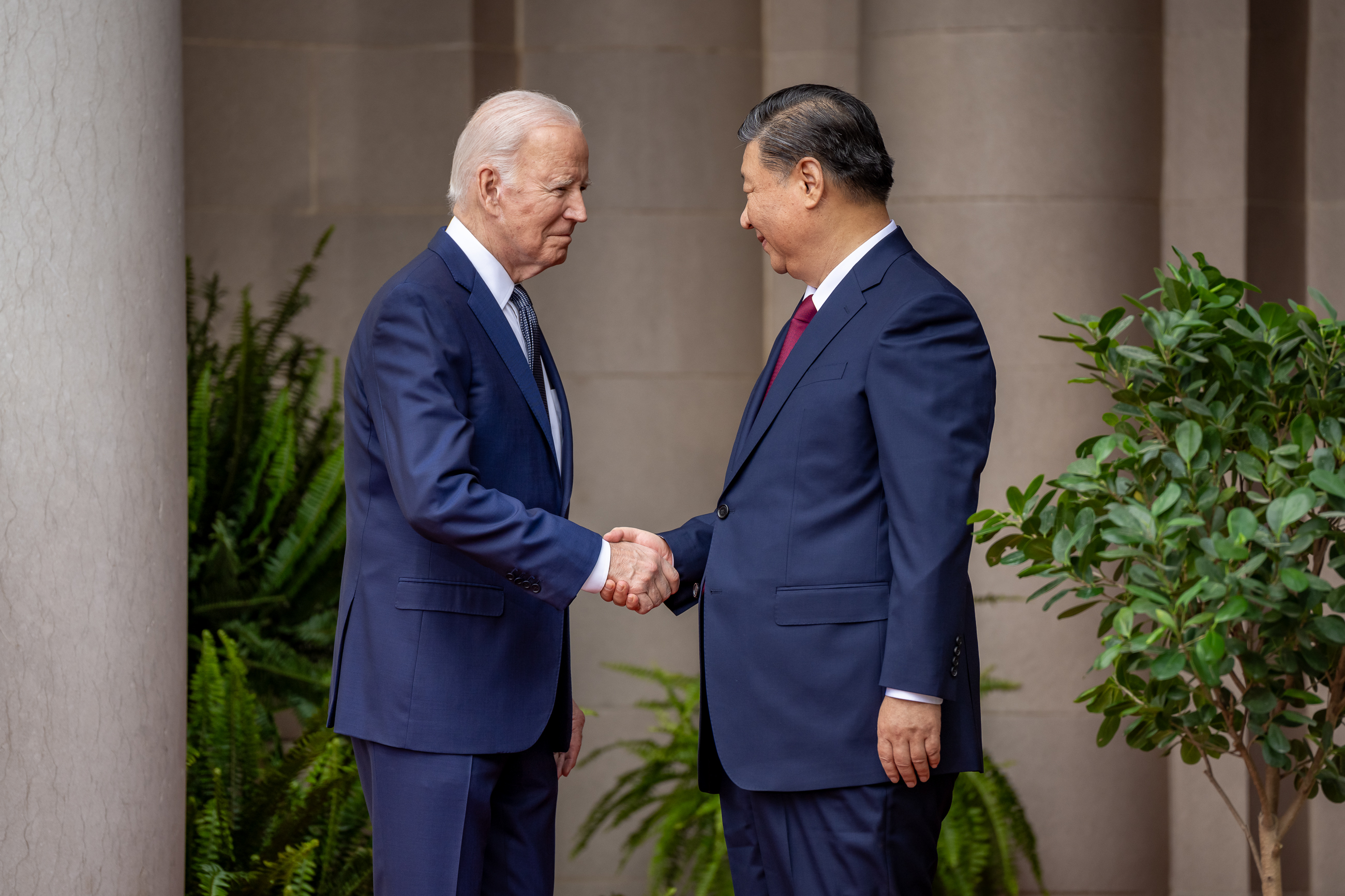

== East Timor (Timor-Leste) ==
Table of Trips
Start	End	Guest	Title	Reason
October 2, 2002	October 2, 2002	Xanana Gusmão	President	Working visit.

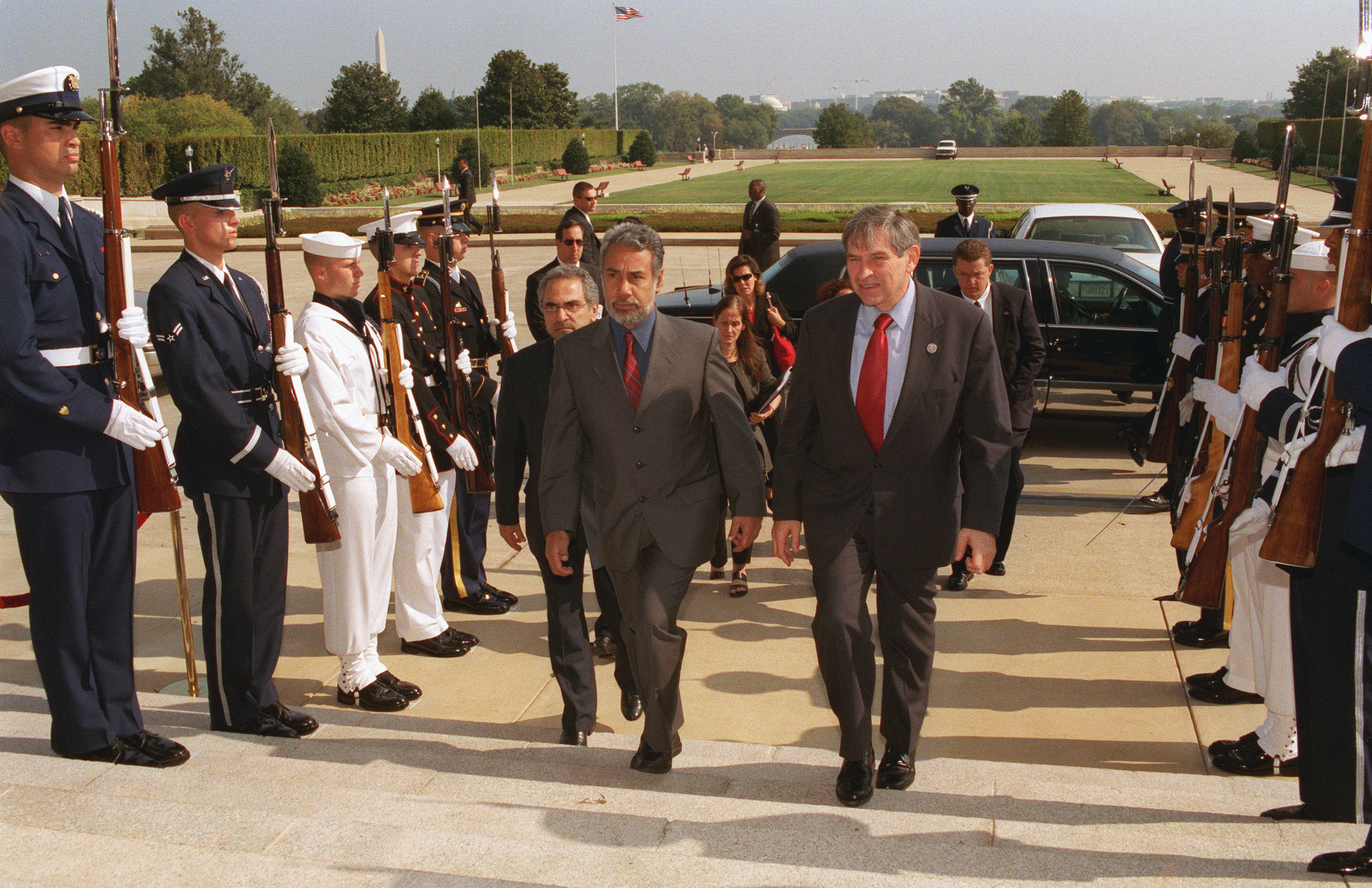

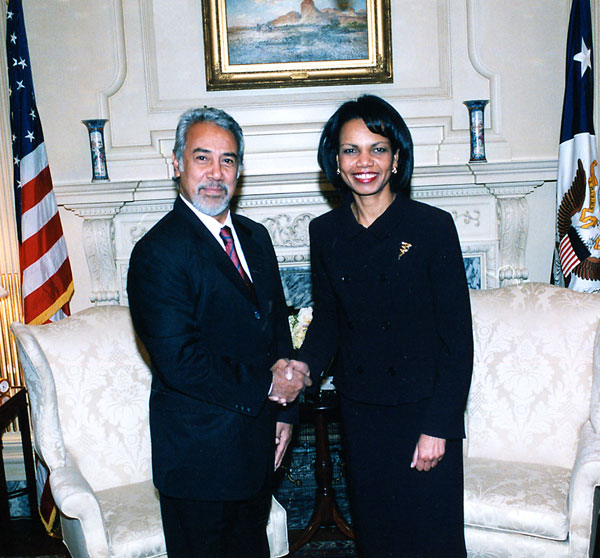

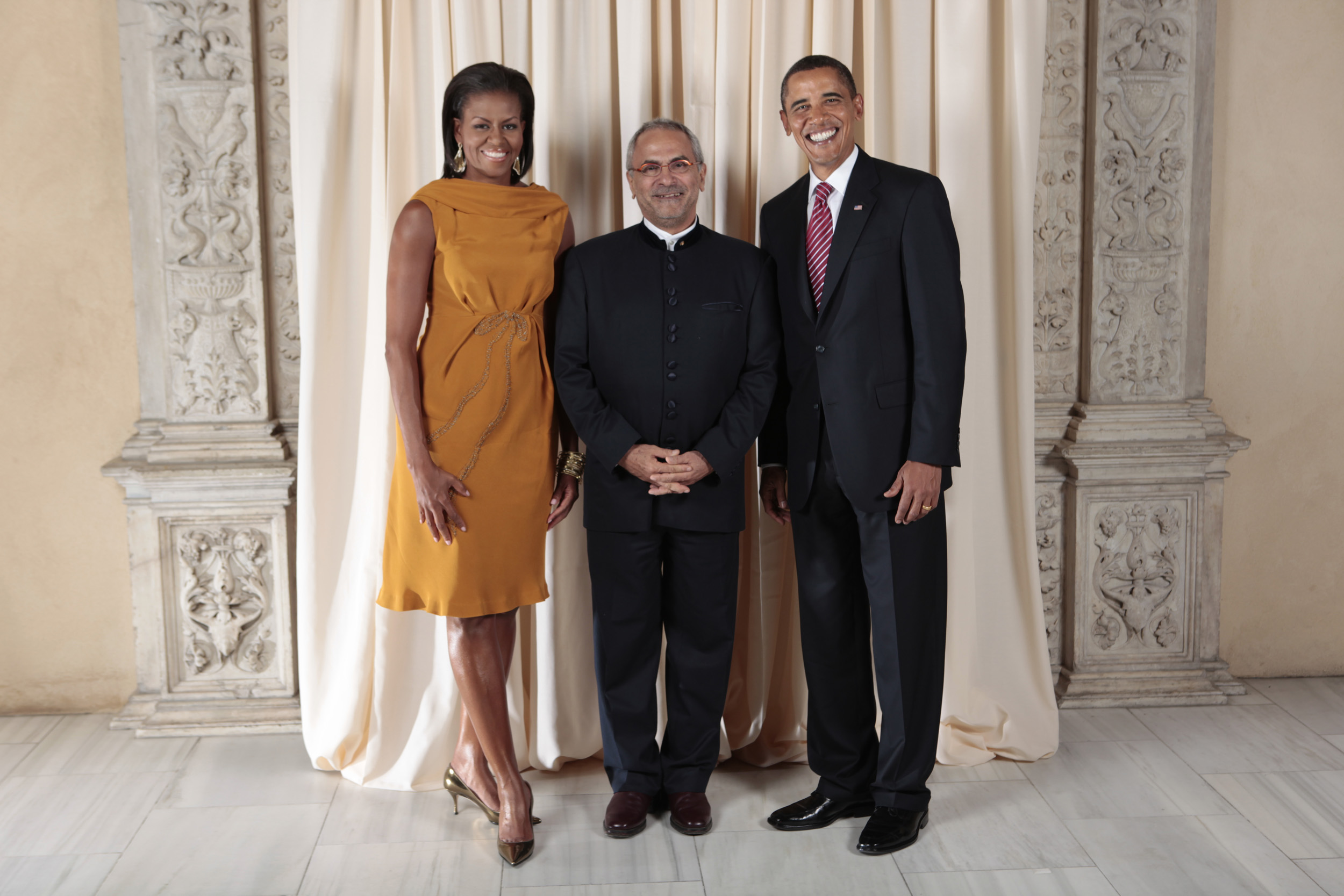

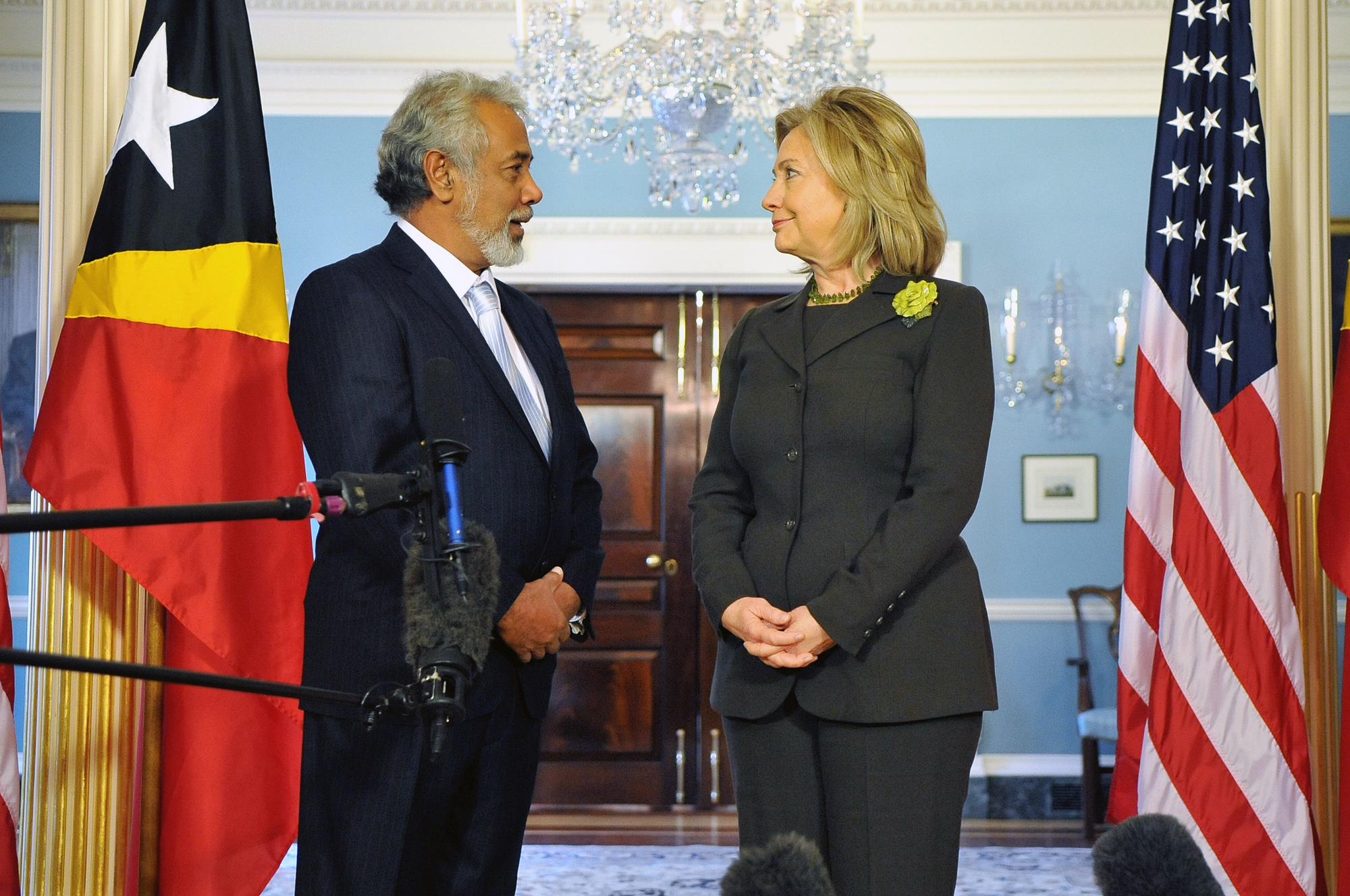

== India ==
Table of Trips
Start	End	Guest	Title	Reason
October 11, 1949	October 15, 1949	Jawaharlal Nehru	Prime Minister	Official visit. Guest of President Truman. Afterwards visited New York City, Chicago, Knoxville, San Francisco, and Madison. Visited Canada on October 22–26. Final departure from US on November 4.
December 16, 1956	December 20, 1956	Jawaharlal Nehru	Prime Minister	Official visit. At Washington, D.C. and Gettysburg
September 26, 1960	September 26, 1960	Jawaharlal Nehru	Prime Minister	Working visit. Met with President Eisenhower in New York City while attending United Nations General Assembly session.
November 6, 1961	November 10, 1961	Jawaharlal Nehru	Prime Minister	Official visit. In US between November 5–14, visited Newport, New York City, and Los Angeles. Departed for Mexico on November 14. Stopped in New York City on November 17 en route to London.
June 3, 1963	June 5, 1963	Sarvepalli Radhakrishnan	President	State visit. In US between June 2–11, visited Williamsburg, Philadelphia, Cape Canaveral, Denver, Los Angeles, and New York City.
March 28, 1966	March 29, 1966	Indira Gandhi	Prime Minister	Official visit. In US between March 27–April 1; visited Williamsburg and New York City
November 3, 1971	November 6, 1971	Indira Gandhi	Prime Minister	Official visit. Afterwards visited New York City. Departed November 7.
June 12, 1978	June 15, 1978	Morarji Desai	Prime Minister	Official visit. In US June 8; visited New York City, San Francisco, and Omaha.
July 27, 1982	July 31, 1982	Indira Gandhi	Prime Minister	Official visit; visited New York City, Los Angeles, and Honolulu, Hawaii. Departed US August 4.
June 11, 1985	June 15, 1985	Rajiv Gandhi	Prime Minister	Official visit. Addressed Joint session of the United States Congress.
October 23, 1985	October 23, 1985	Rajiv Gandhi	Prime Minister	Working visit. Met with President Reagan in New York City, at reception and luncheon at the United Nations.
October 19, 1987	October 20, 1987	Rajiv Gandhi	Prime Minister	Official working visit.
January 31, 1992	January 31, 1992	P. V. Narasimha Rao	Prime Minister	Working visit. Met with President Bush during a United Nations Security Council summit in New York City.
May 17, 1994	May 20, 1994	P. V. Narasimha Rao	Prime Minister	Official visit. Arrived in US May 15; also visited New York City, Houston, and Boston. Addressed Joint session of the United States Congress.
September 22, 1997	September 22, 1997	Inder Kumar Gujral	Prime Minister	Working visit. Met with President Clinton at the United Nations General Assembly in New York City.
September 13, 2000	September 17, 2000	Atal Bihari Vajpayee	Prime Minister	Official Visit. Addressed Joint session of the United States Congress.
November 7, 2001	November 9, 2001	Atal Bihari Vajpayee	Prime Minister	Official working visit.
September 12, 2002	September 12, 2002	Atal Bihari Vajpayee	Prime Minister	Working visit. Met with President Bush at the United Nations General Assembly in New York City.
September 24, 2003	September 24, 2003	Atal Bihari Vajpayee	Prime Minister	Working visit. Met with President Bush at the United Nations General Assembly in New York City.
September 21, 2004	September 21, 2004	Manmohan Singh	Prime Minister	Working visit. Met with President Bush at the United Nations General Assembly in New York City.
July 17, 2005	July 20, 2005	Manmohan Singh	Prime Minister	Official visit. Addressed Joint session of the United States Congress.
September 15, 2005	September 17, 2005	Manmohan Singh	Prime Minister	Working visit. Addressed the General debate of the sixteenth session of the United Nations General Assembly.
September 23, 2008	September 25, 2008	Manmohan Singh	Prime Minister	Working visit.
November 14, 2008	November 15, 2008	Manmohan Singh	Prime Minister	Official working visit. Attended the G20 summit.
September 24, 2009	September 25, 2009	Manmohan Singh	Prime Minister	Official working visit. Attended the G20 summit in Pittsburgh
November 23, 2009	November 25, 2009	Manmohan Singh	Prime Minister	State visit.
April 11, 2010	April 13, 2010	Manmohan Singh	Prime Minister	Official working visit. Attended the Nuclear Security Summit
September 21, 2011	September 27, 2011	Manmohan Singh	Prime Minister	Working visit. Addressed the General debate of the sixty-sixth session of the United Nations General Assembly.
September 27, 2013	September 27, 2013	Manmohan Singh	Prime Minister	Working visit.
September 29, 2014	September 30, 2014	Narendra Modi	Prime Minister	Working visit. Attended the General debate of the sixty-ninth session of the United Nations General Assembly.
September 24, 2015	September 30, 2015	Narendra Modi	Prime Minister	Official visit. Visited New York City and San Francisco.
March 31, 2016	April 1, 2016	Narendra Modi	Prime Minister	Official working visit. Attended the Nuclear Security Summit
June 7, 2016	June 8, 2016	Narendra Modi	Prime Minister	Official visit. Addressed the joint session of the United States Congress.
June 25, 2017	June 26, 2017	Narendra Modi	Prime Minister	Official working visit.
September 22, 2019	September 22, 2019	Narendra Modi	Prime Minister	Participated in a rally in Houston, Texas.
September 24, 2021	September 24, 2021	Narendra Modi	Prime Minister	Working Visit; Quad Leaders' Summit.
June 22, 2023	June 22, 2023	Narendra Modi	Prime Minister	State Visit.
September 21, 2024	September 21, 2024	Narendra Modi	Prime Minister	Attended Quad Leaders' Summit in Claymont, Delaware.
February 13, 2025	February 14, 2025	Narendra Modi	Prime Minister	Official working visit.

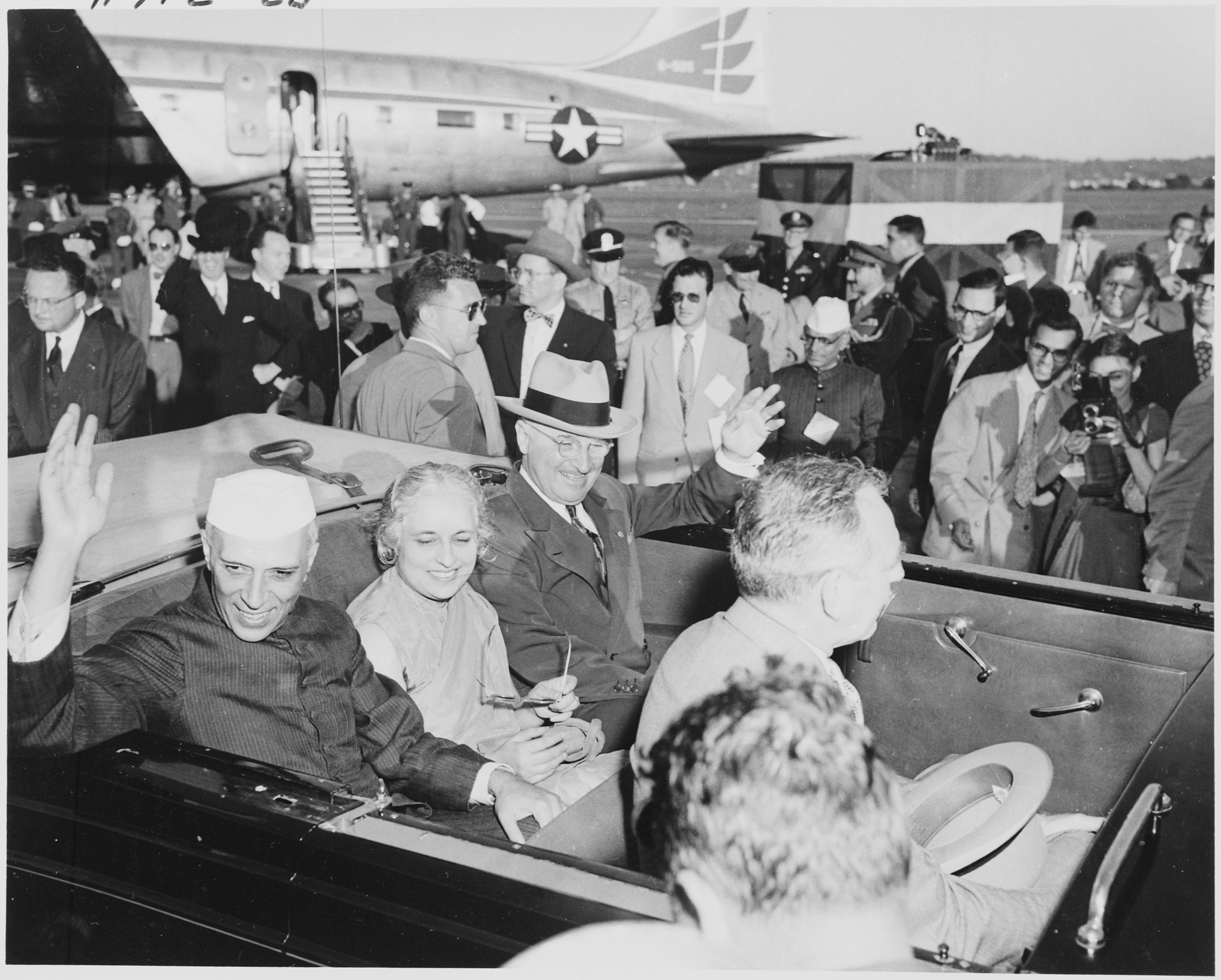

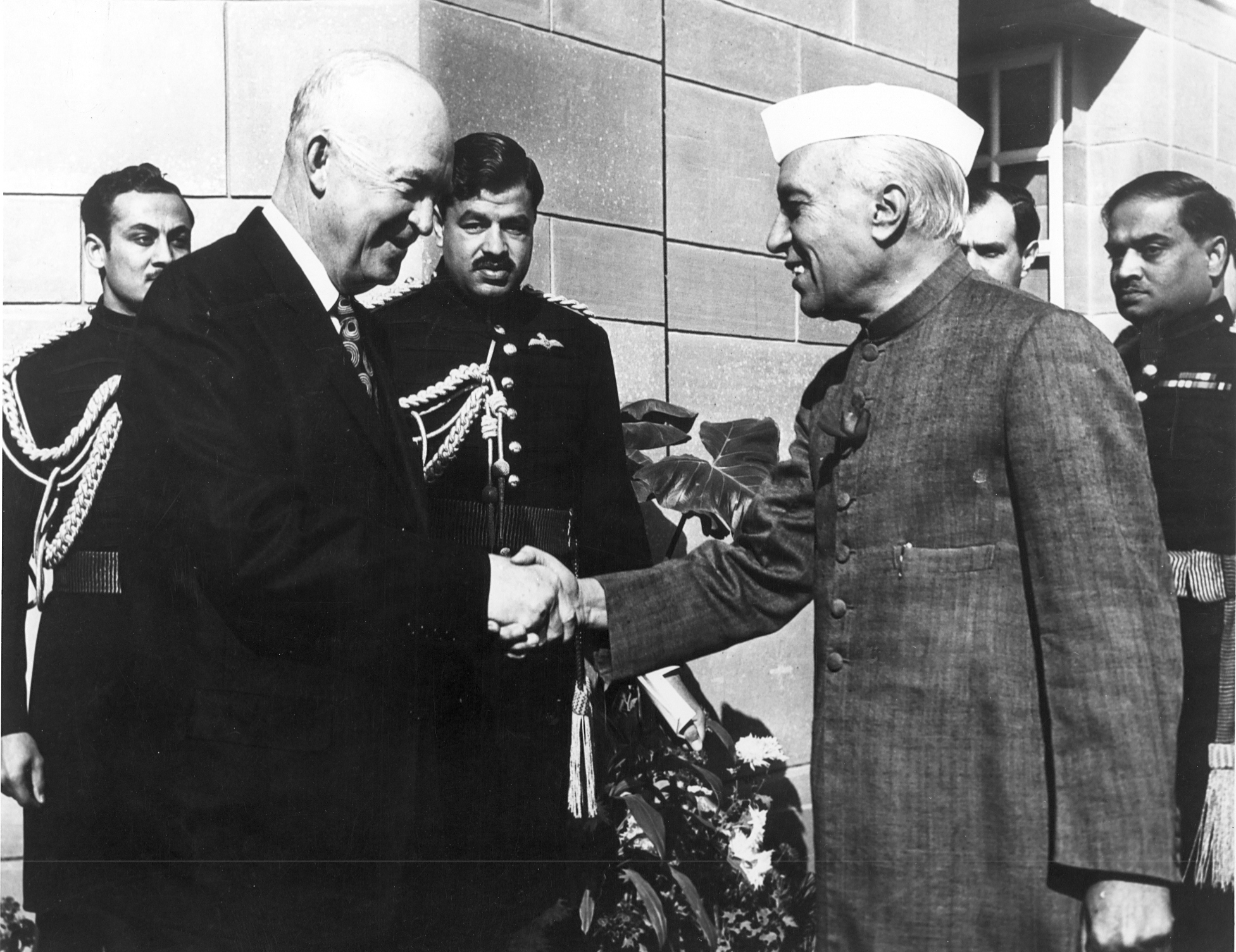

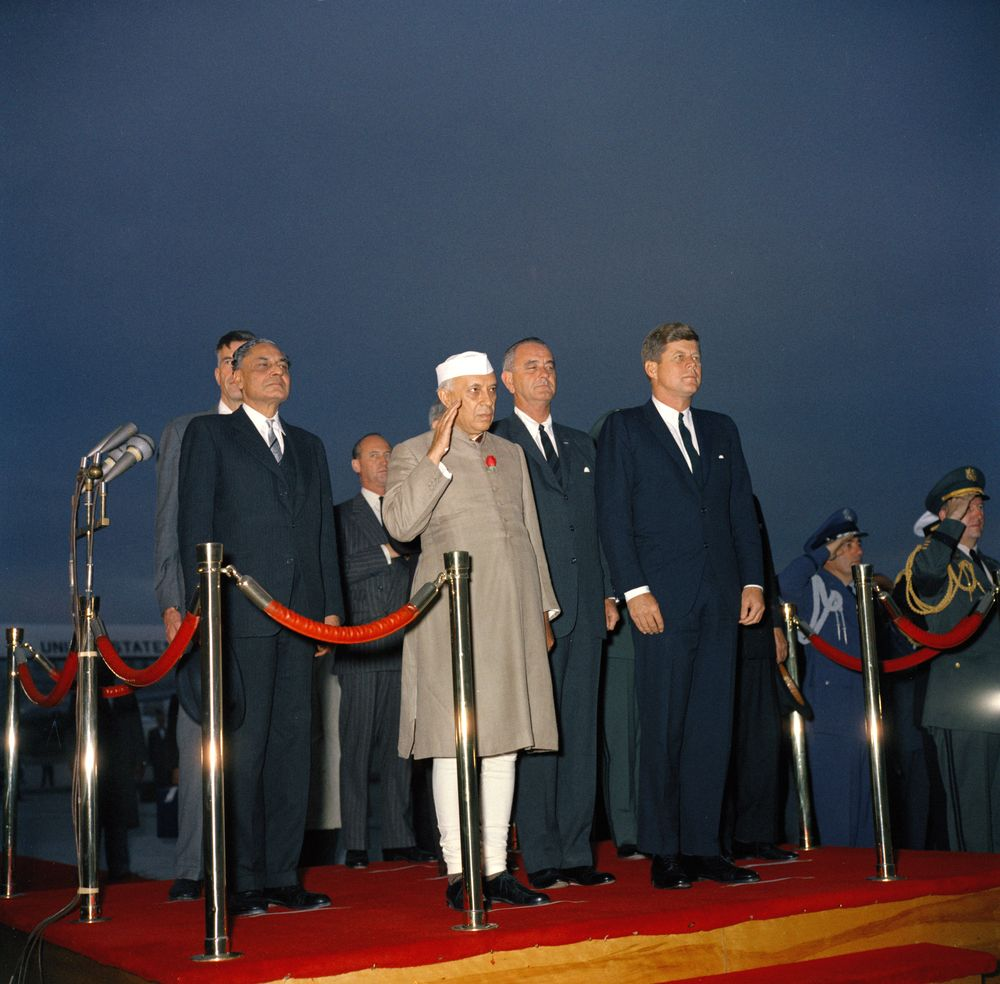

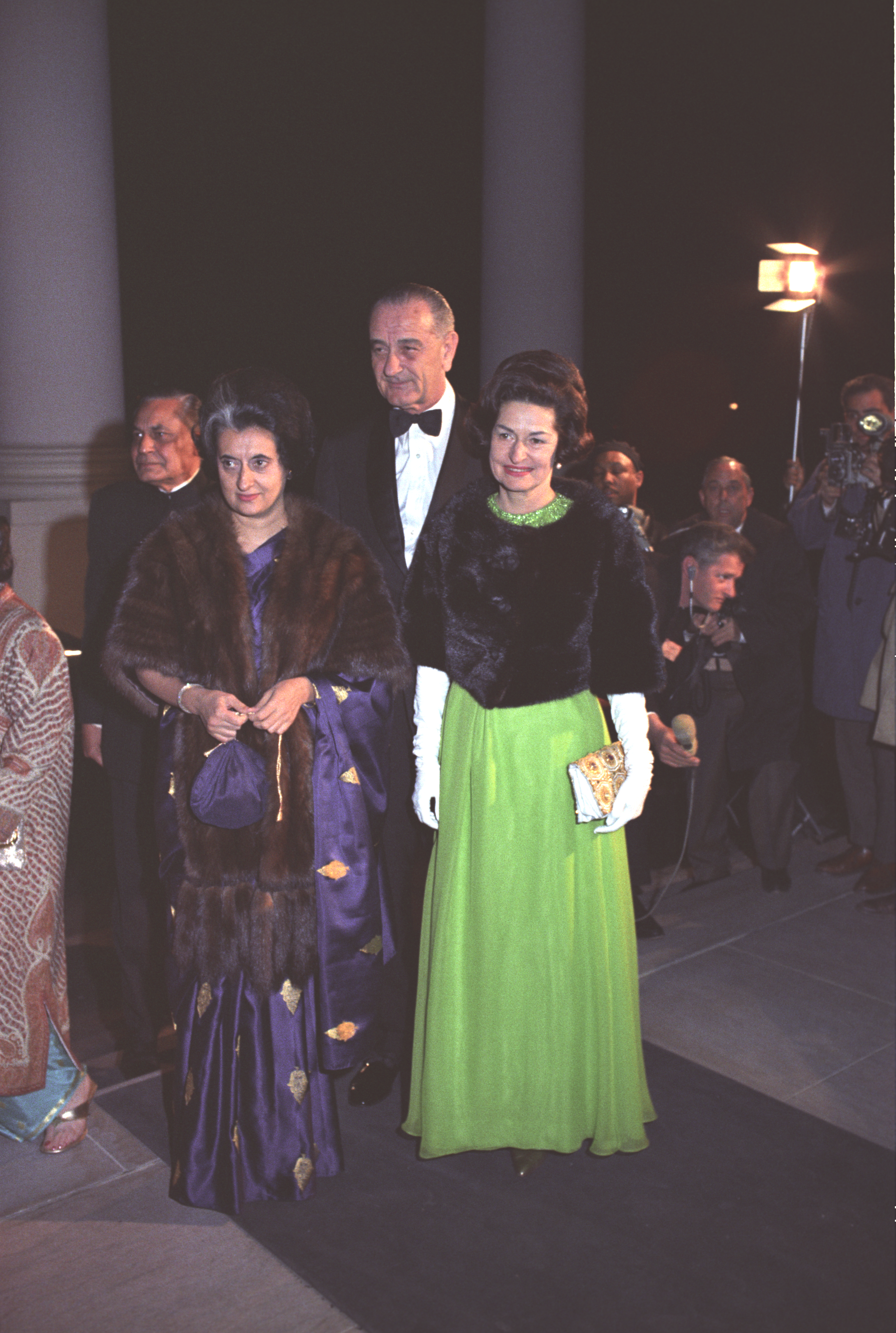

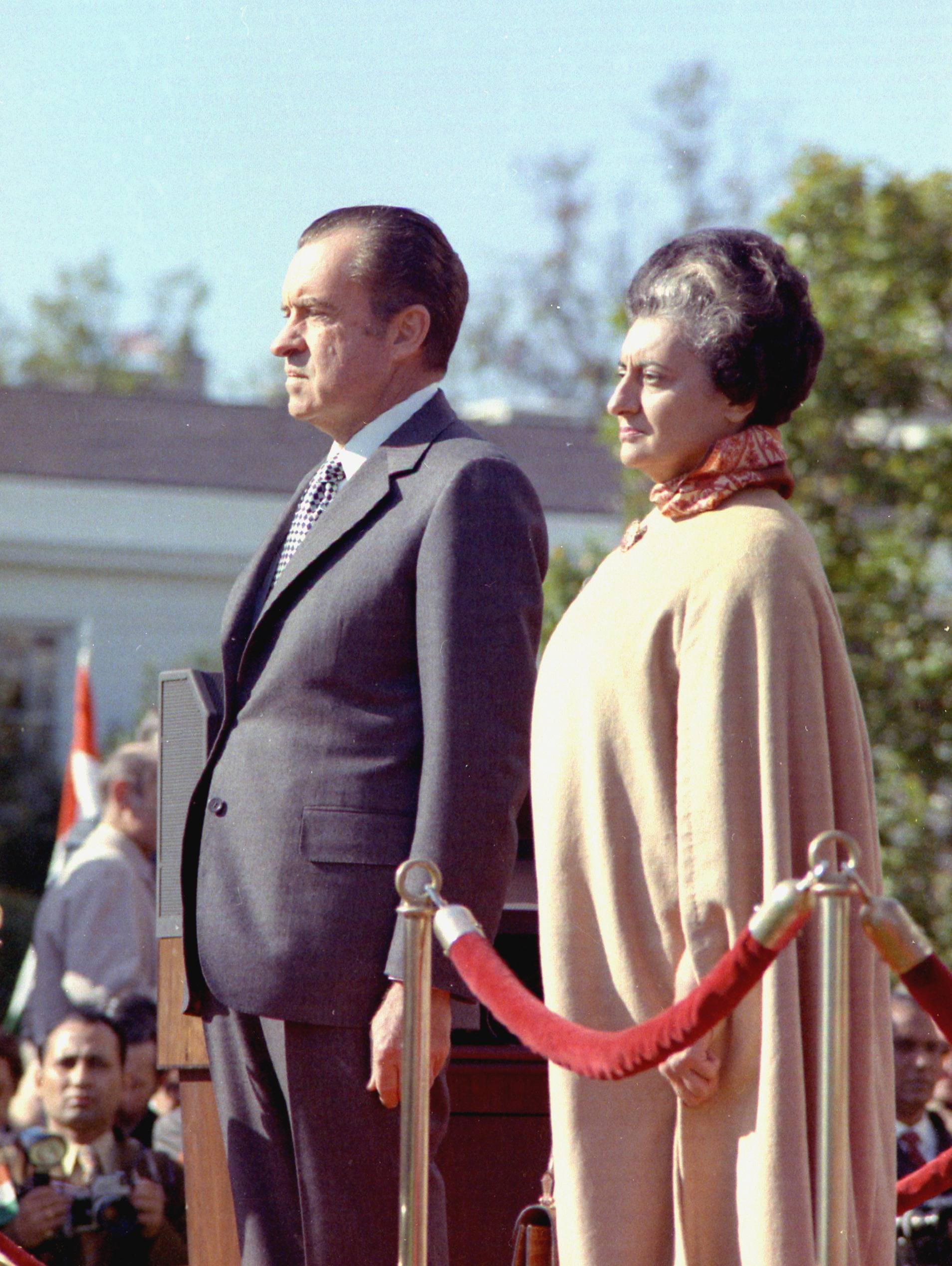

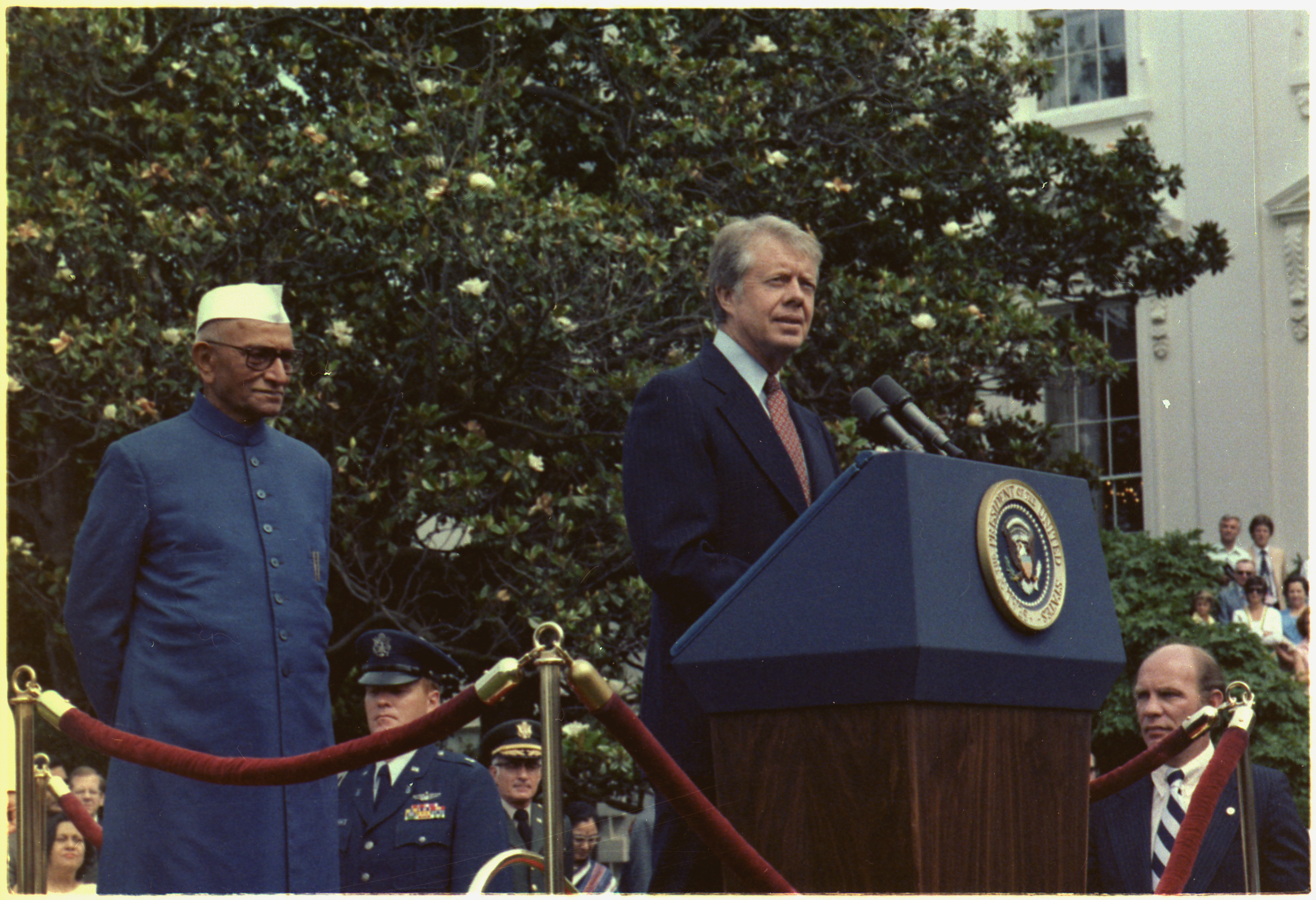

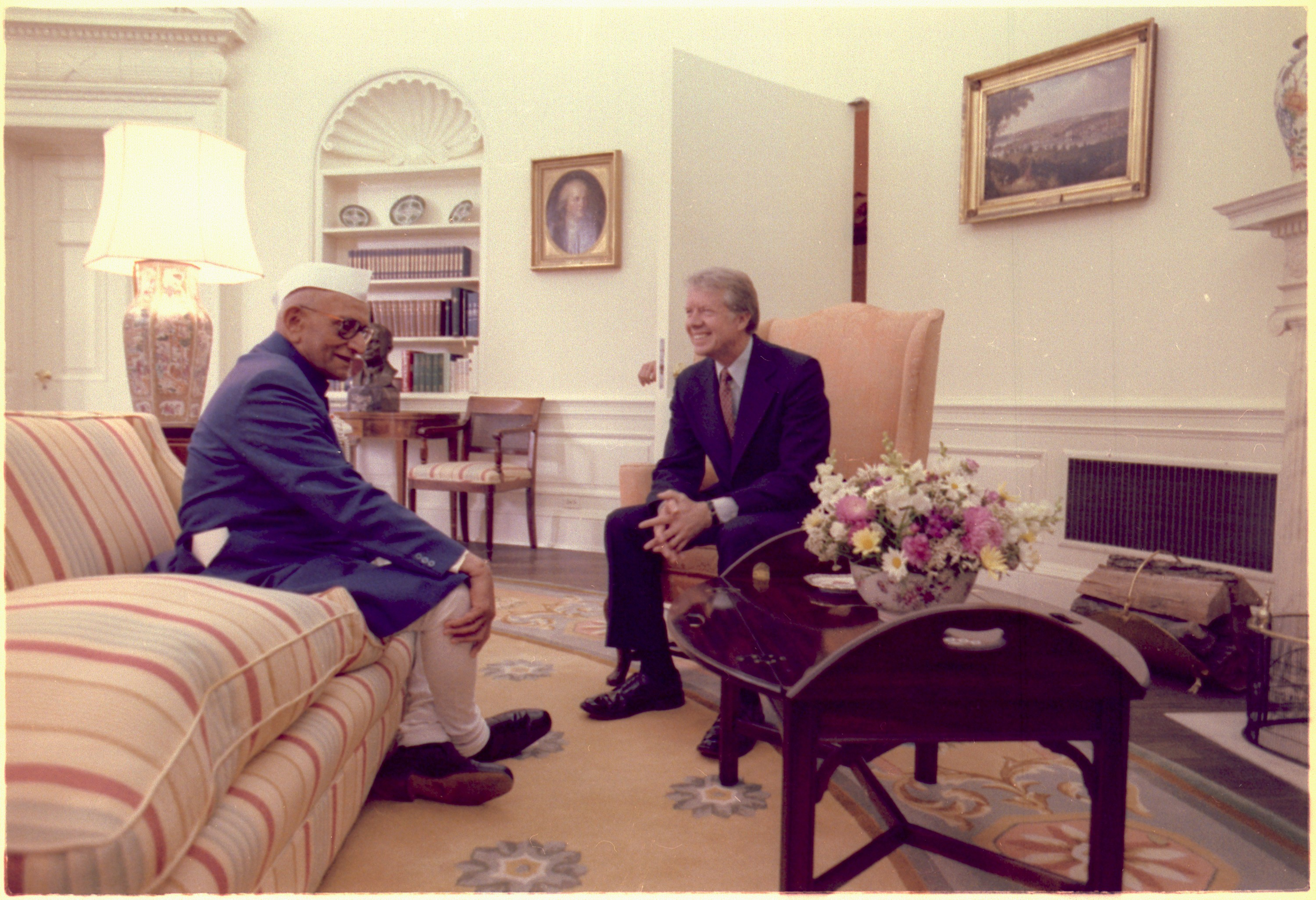

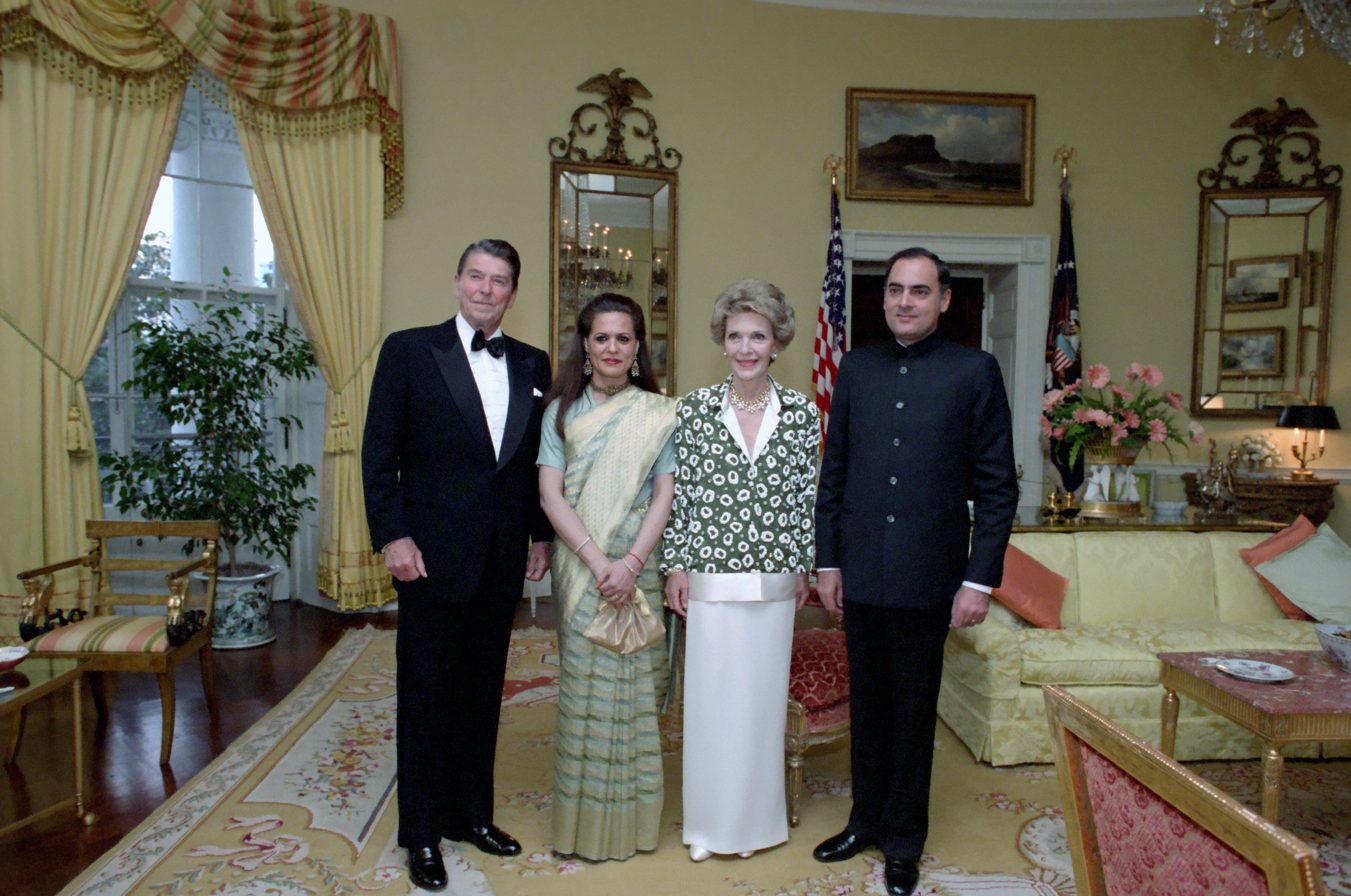

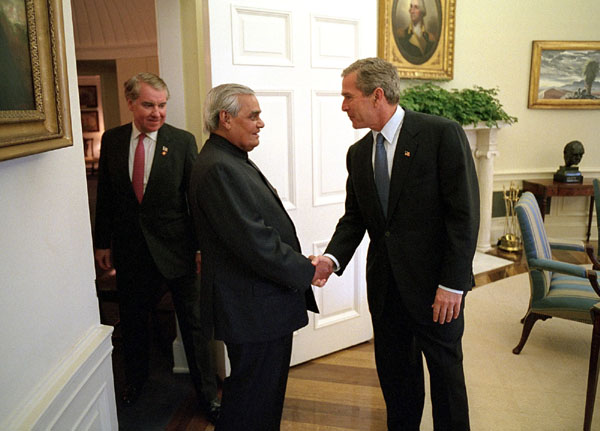

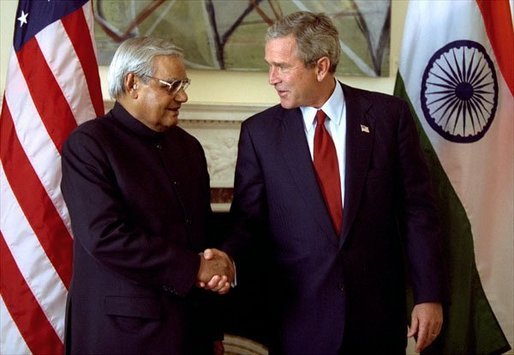

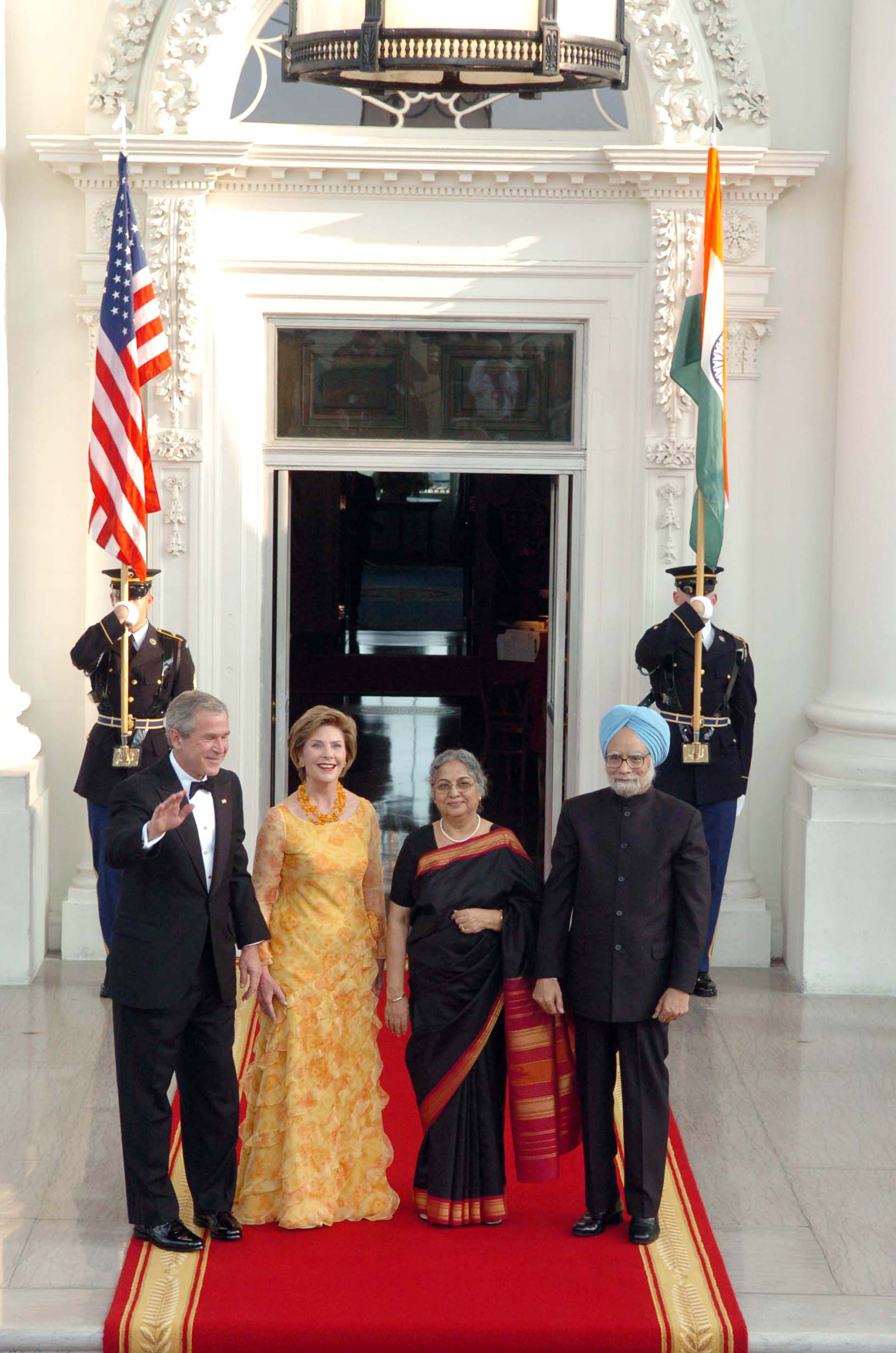

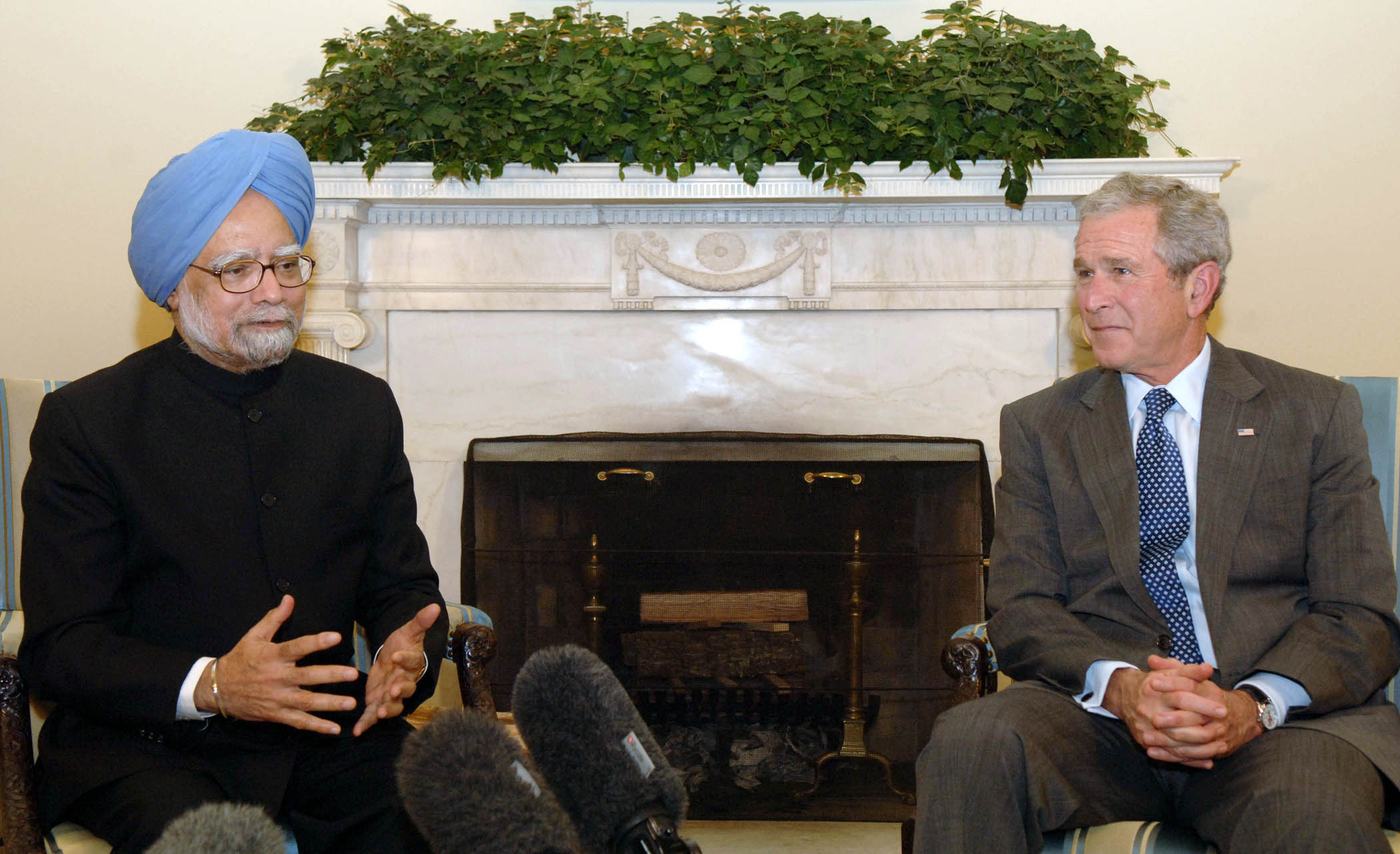

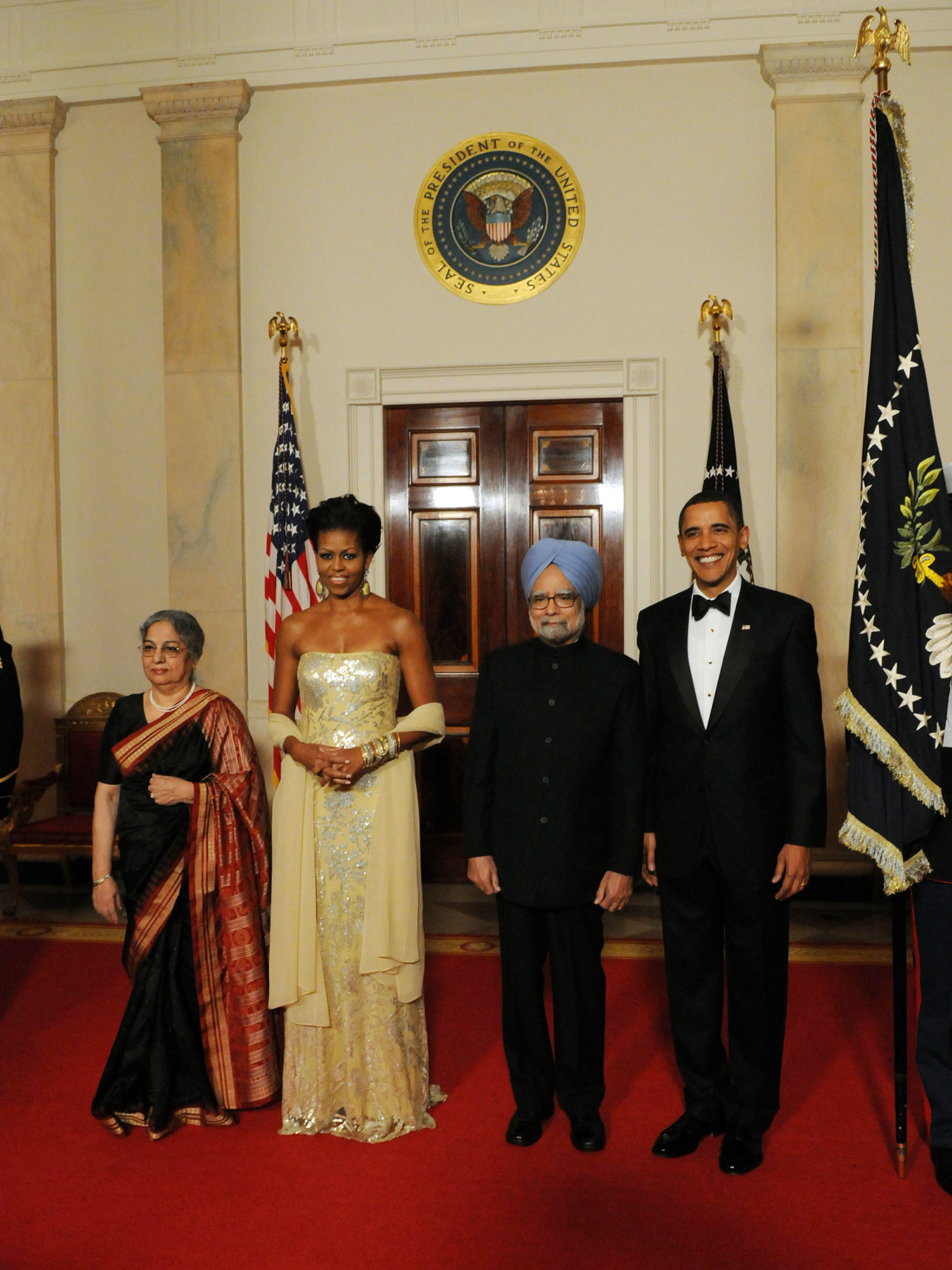

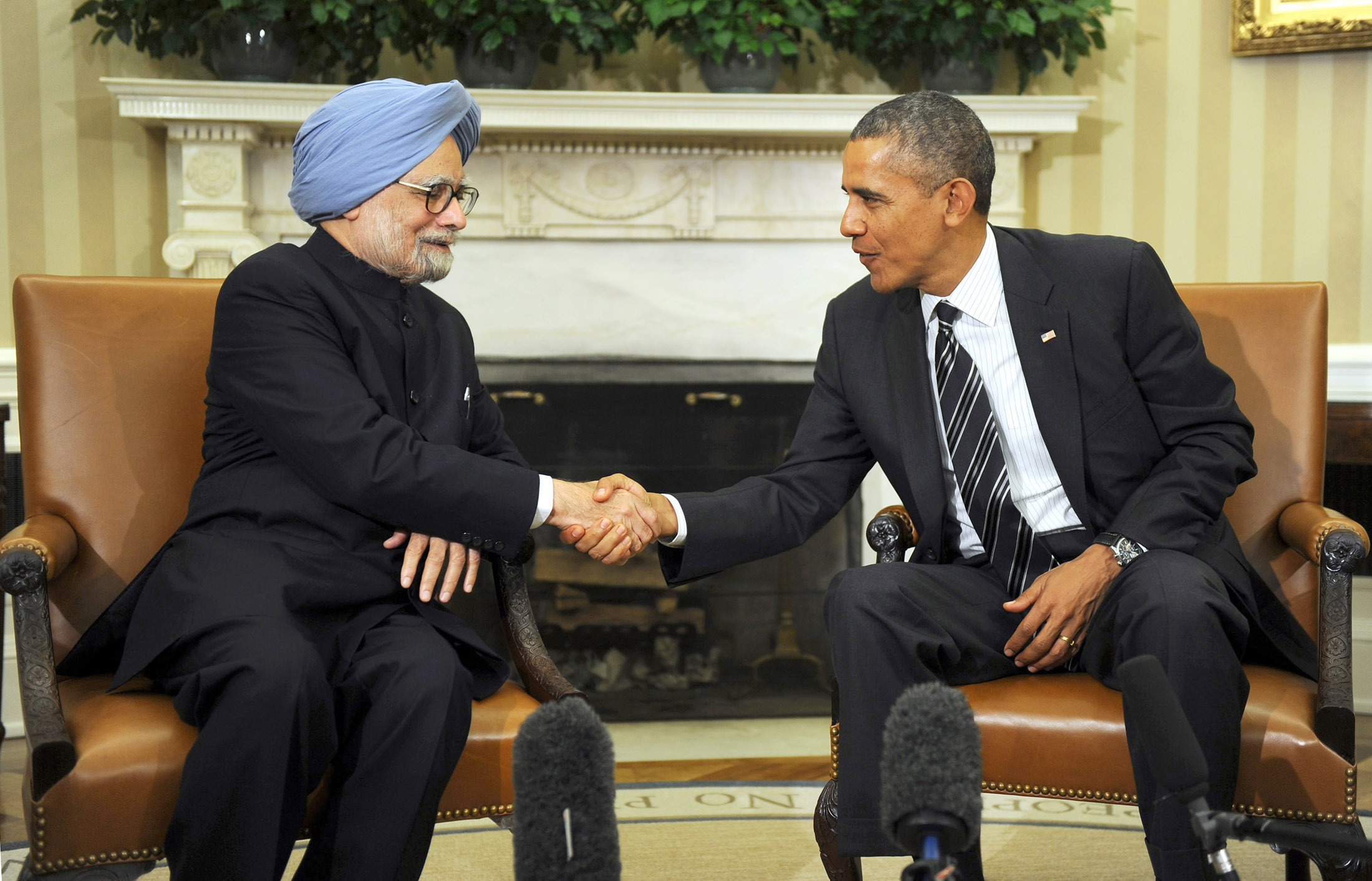

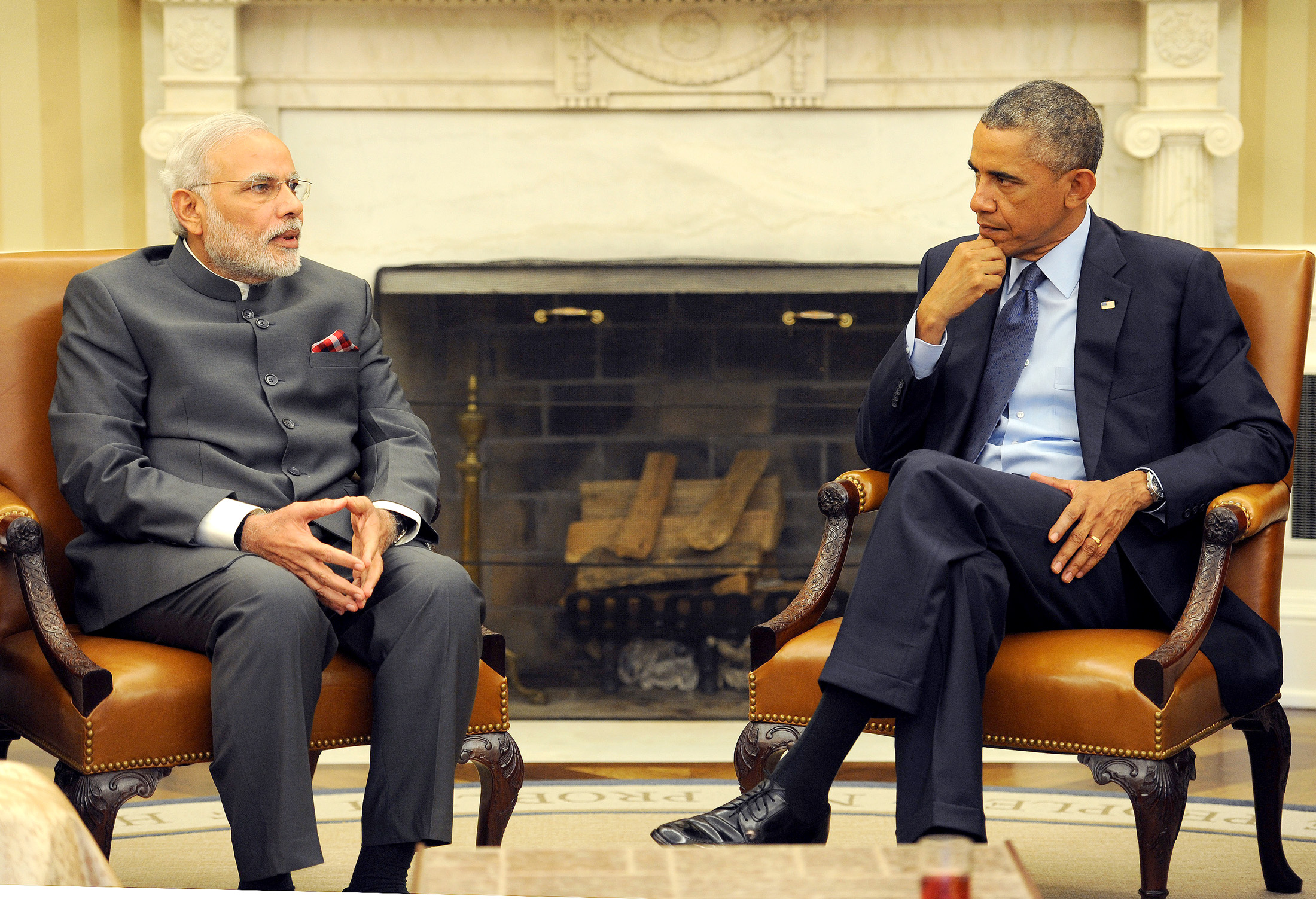

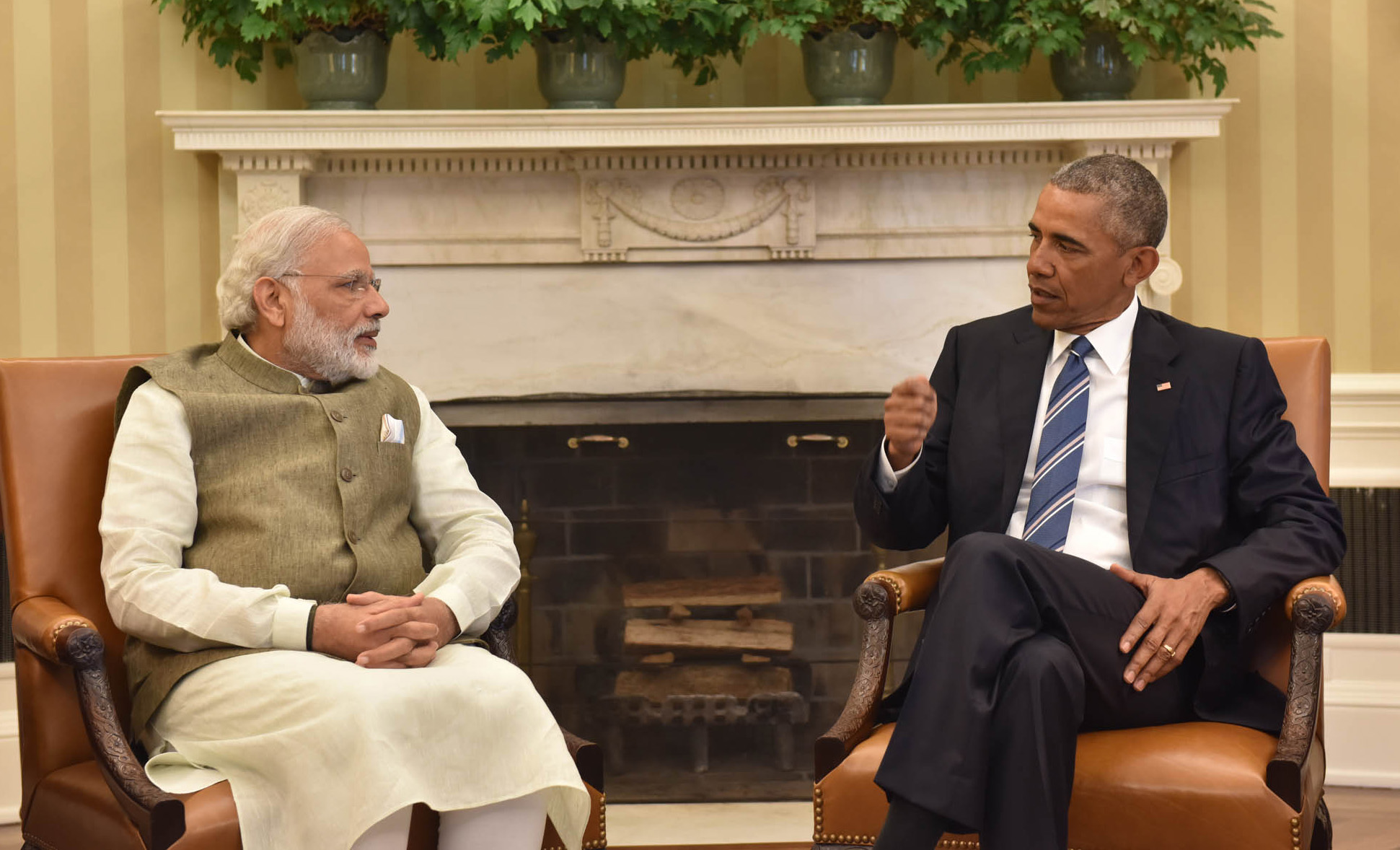

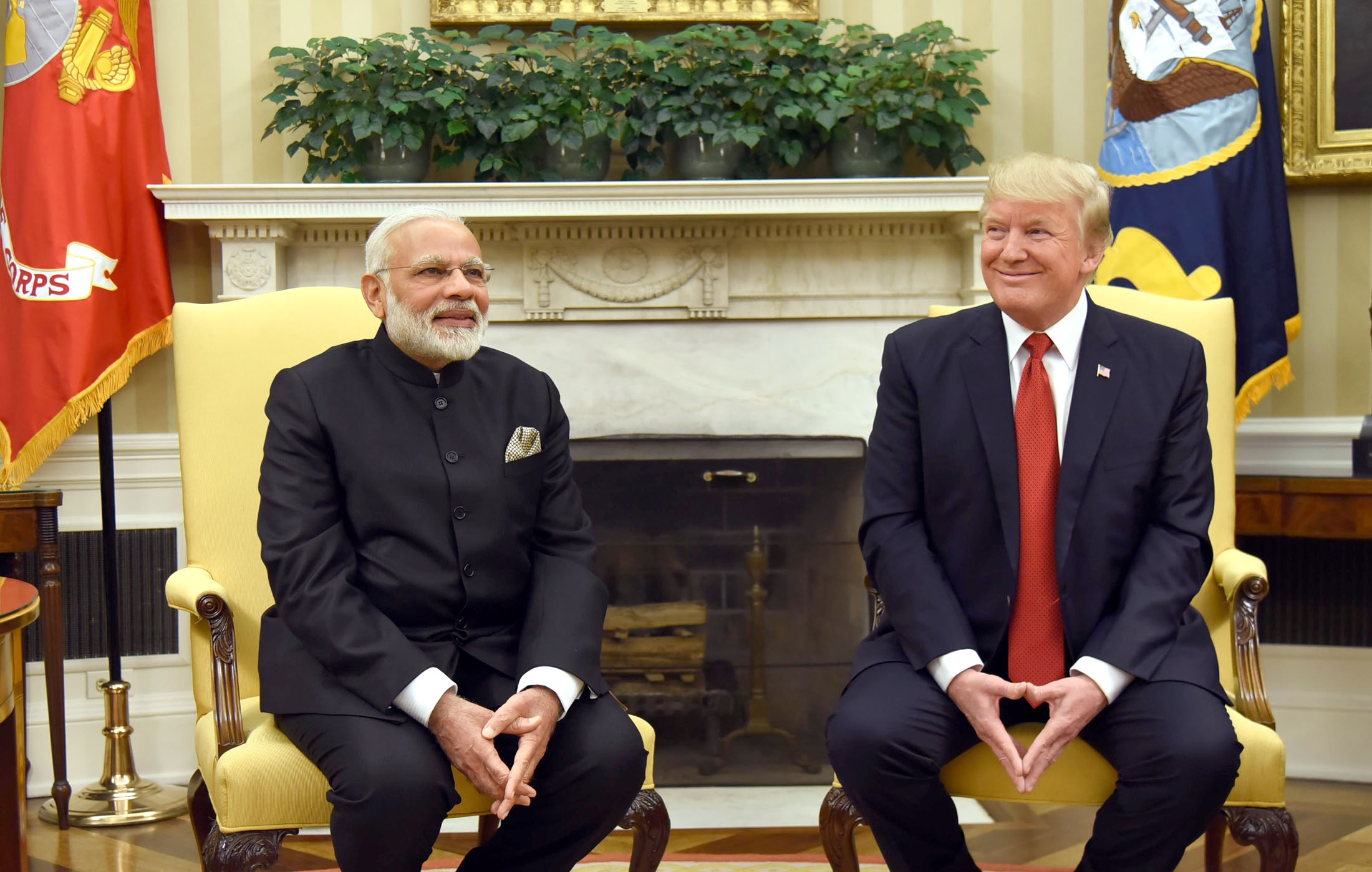

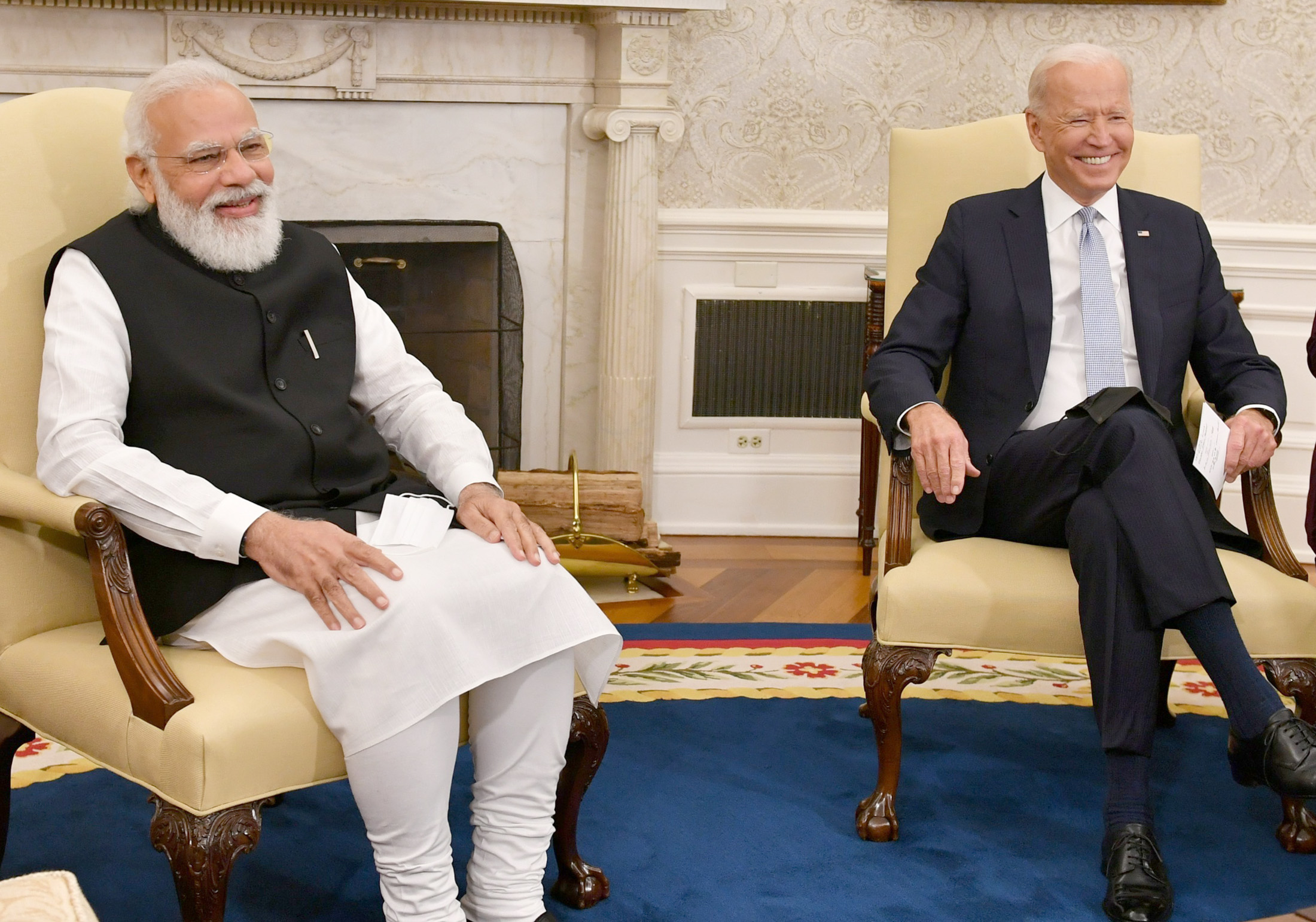

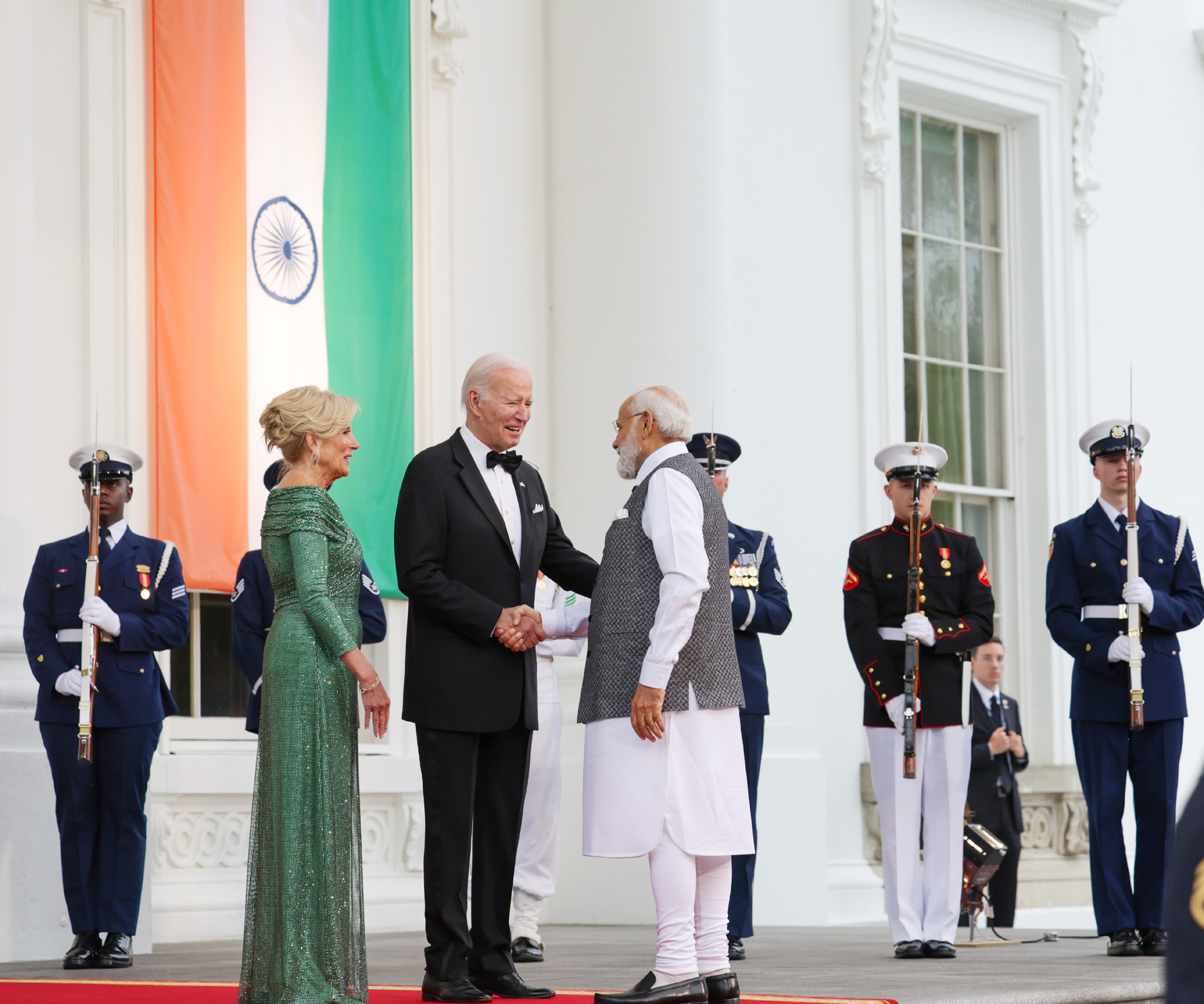

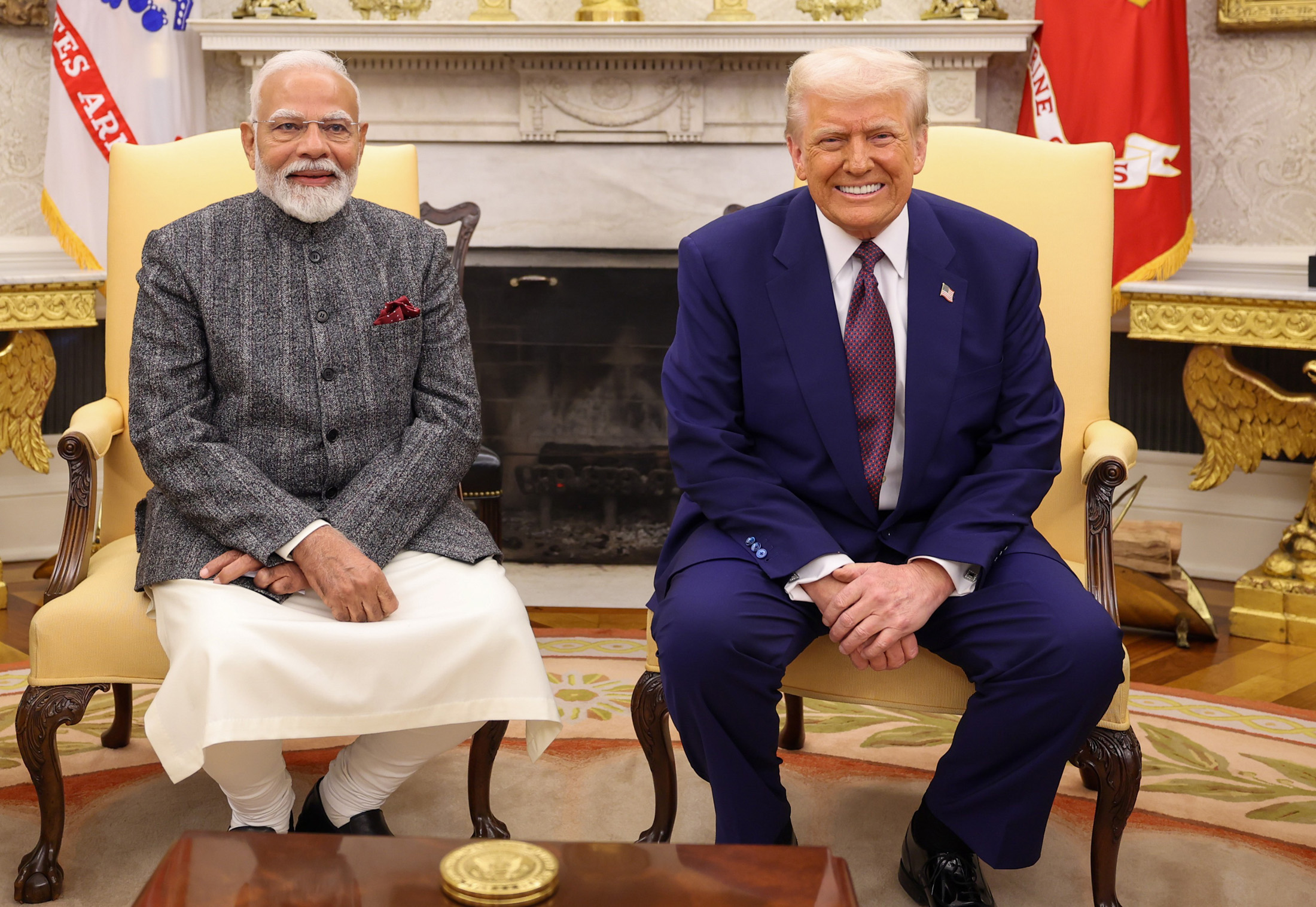

== Indonesia ==
Table of Trips
Start	End	Guest	Title	Reason
May 16, 1956	May 18, 1956	Sukarno	President	State visit.Addressed U.S.Congress May 17.Afterwards visited Charlottesville, Annapolis, New York City, Philadelphia, Springfield, Detroit, Grand Canyon, Los Angeles, Salt Lake City, and Niagara Falls.Departed U.S.June 3.
October 6, 1960	October 6, 1960	Sukarno	President	Met with President Eisenhower in Washington, D.C. while attending UN General Assembly.
April 24, 1961	April 25, 1961	Sukarno	President	Informal visit. Arrived in U.S.April 20, visiting Honolulu, Hawaii and Los Angeles.
September 12, 1961	September 13, 1961	Sukarno	President	Informal visit after attending Conference of Non-aligned nations in Belgrade.
May 26, 1970	May 28, 1970	Suharto	President	State visit.In U.S.May 25 – June 1; visited Williamsburg, New York City, Knoxville, Los Angeles, and San Francisco.
July 5, 1975	July 5, 1975	Suharto	President	Private visit at Camp David during a world tour.
October 12, 1982	October 13, 1982	Suharto	President	State visit; visited Cape Canaveral, Houston, and Honolulu, Hawaii.Departed U.S.October 15.
June 9, 1989	June 9, 1989	Suharto	President	Met with President Bush during a private visit.
November 17, 1993	November 21, 1993	Suharto	President	Attended Asia-Pacific Economic Cooperation meeting in Seattle.
October 26, 1995	October 26, 1995	Suharto	President	Met with President Clinton during a private visit.
November 12, 1999	November 12, 1999	Abdurrahman Wahid	President	Met with President Clinton November 12 during a private visit.Afterwards went to Salt Lake City for medical treatment.
June 12, 2000	June 12, 2000	Abdurrahman Wahid	President	Met with President Clinton during a private visit.
September 18, 2001	September 21, 2001	Megawati Sukarnoputri	President	Official working visit.
September 23, 2003	September 23, 2003	Megawati Sukarnoputri	President	Met with President Bush at the UN General Assembly in New York City.
May 25, 2005	May 25, 2005	Susilo Bambang Yudhoyono	President	Working visit.
November 14, 2008	November 15, 2008	Susilo Bambang Yudhoyono	President	Attended the G-20 Economic Summit meeting.
September 24, 2009	September 25, 2009	Susilo Bambang Yudhoyono	President	Attended the G-20 Economic Summit, Pittsburgh
November 10, 2011	November 13, 2011	Susilo Bambang Yudhoyono	President	Attended the Asia-Pacific Economic Cooperation Summit at Honolulu and Kapolei, Hawaii.
October 26, 2015	October 26, 2015	Joko Widodo	President	Official Working Visit.
February 16, 2016	February 18, 2016	Joko Widodo	President	Attended the ASEAN Leaders Summit at Sunnylands, California.
May 12, 2022	May 13, 2022	Joko Widodo	President	Attended the U.S.-ASEAN Summit.
November 13, 2023	November 13, 2023	Joko Widodo	President	Official Working Visit.
November 14, 2023	November 17, 2023	Joko Widodo	President	Attended the APEC Leaders' Summit at San Francisco, California.
November 12, 2024	November 12, 2024	Prabowo Subianto	President	Official Visit.

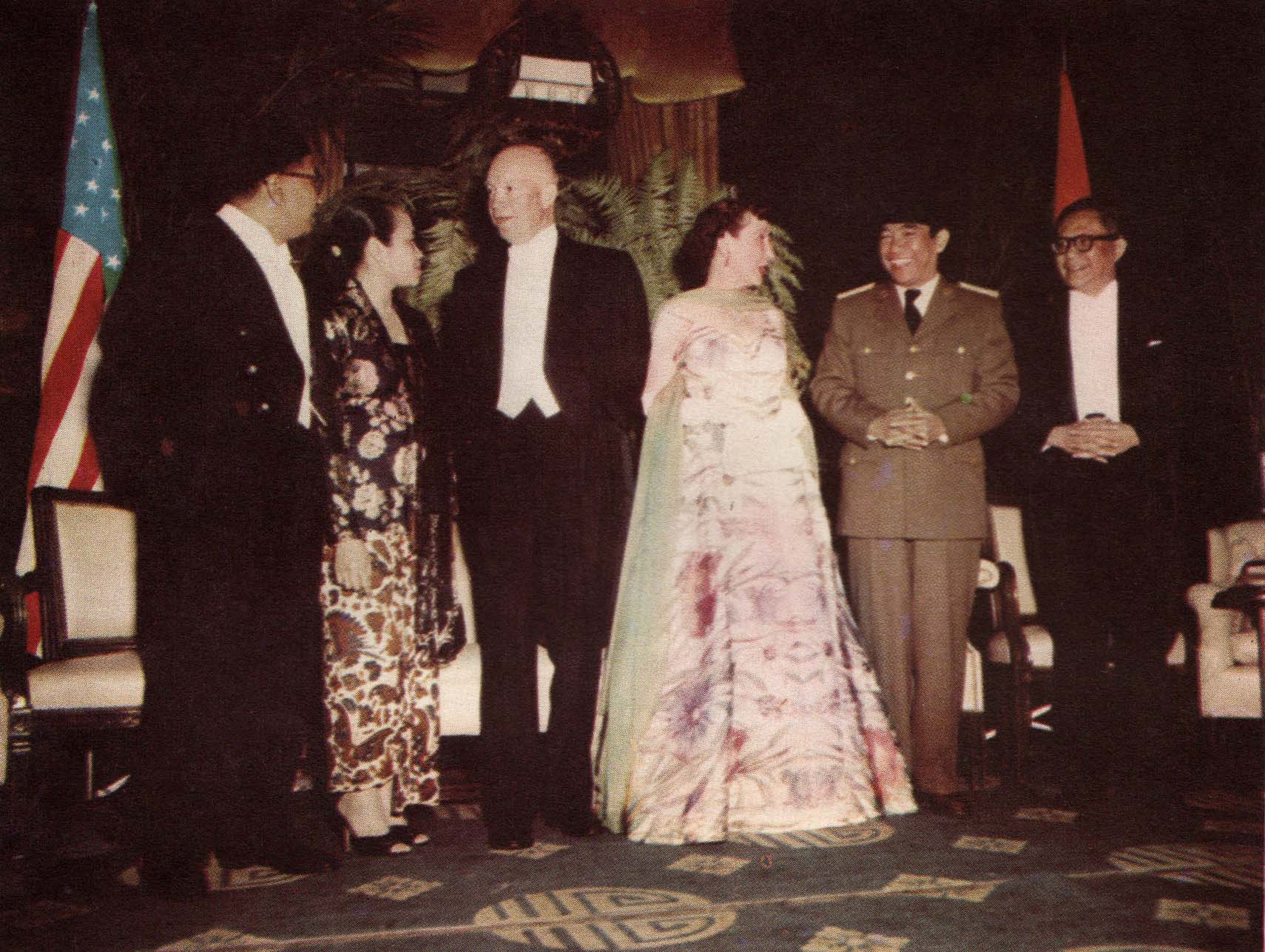

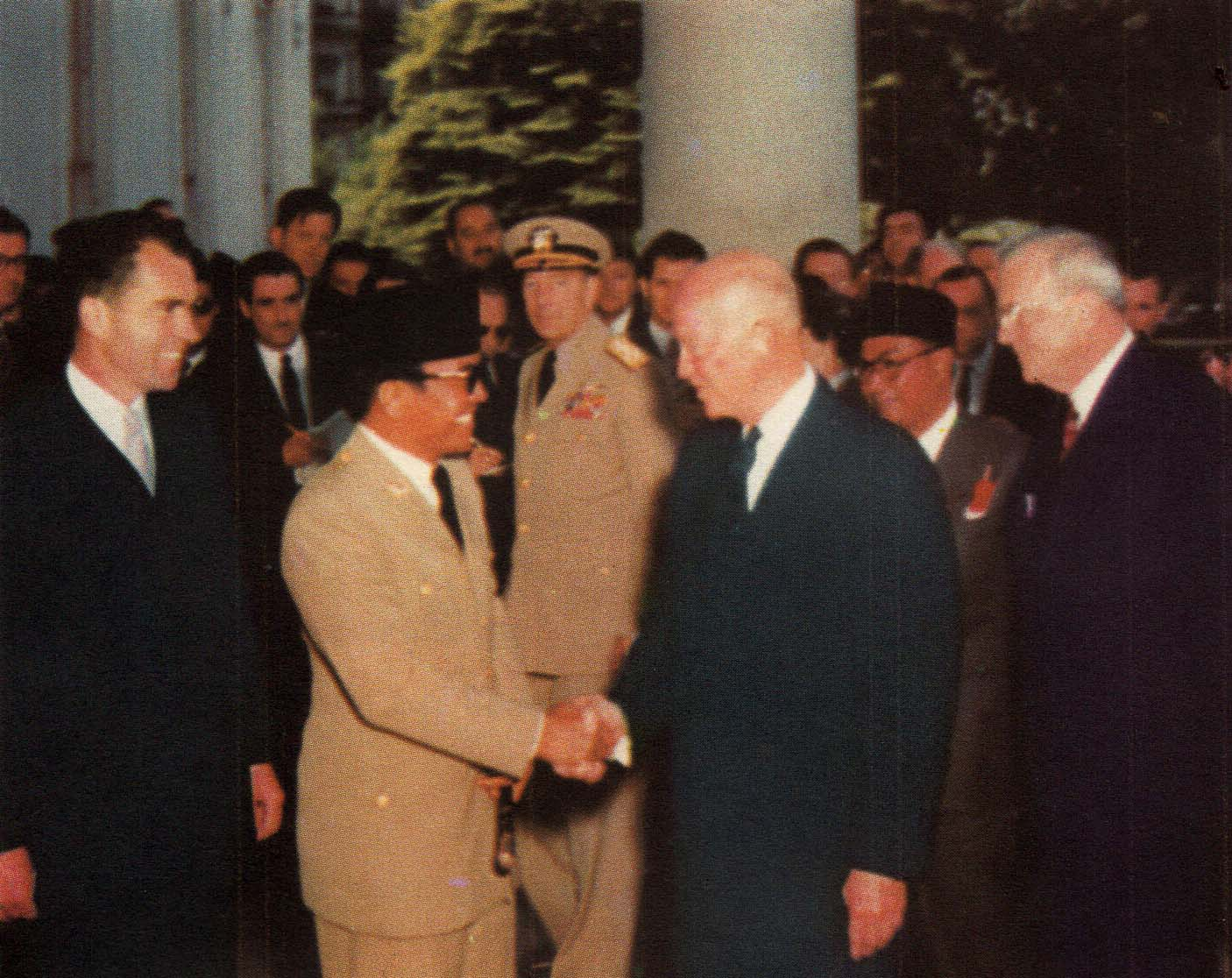

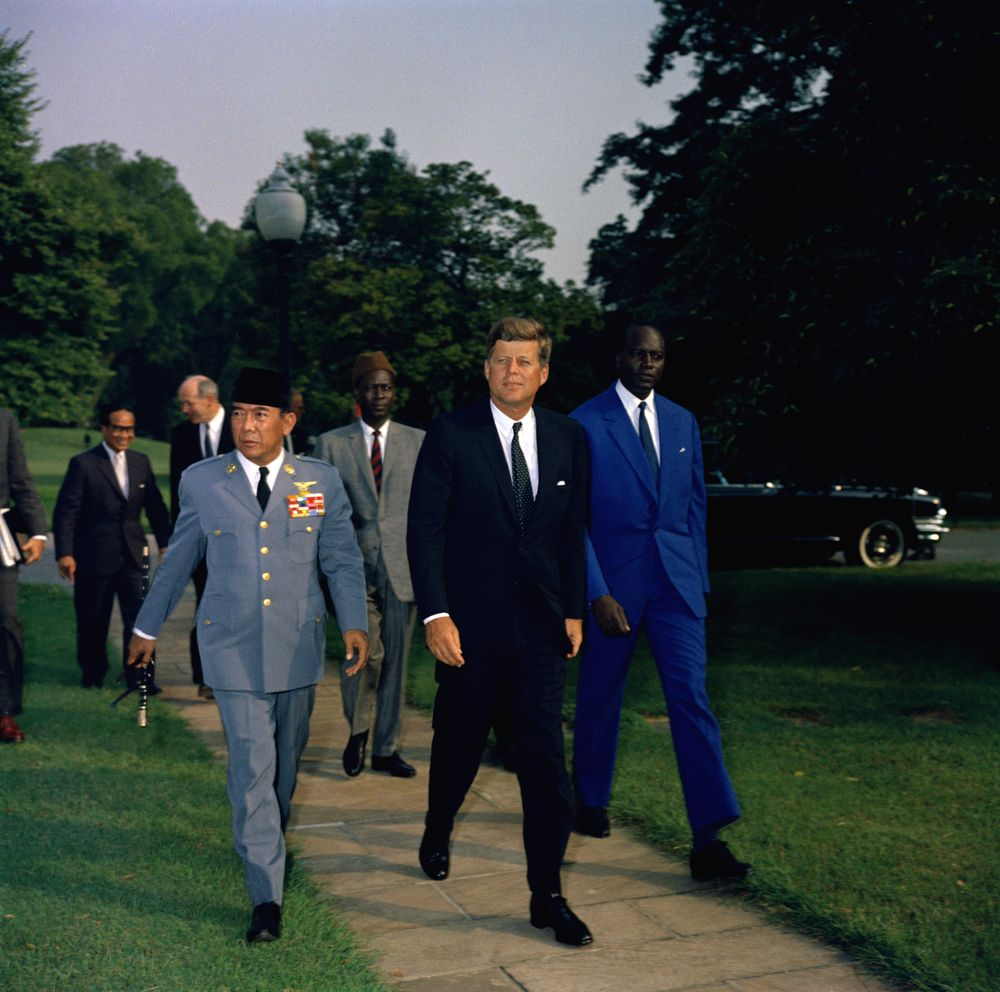

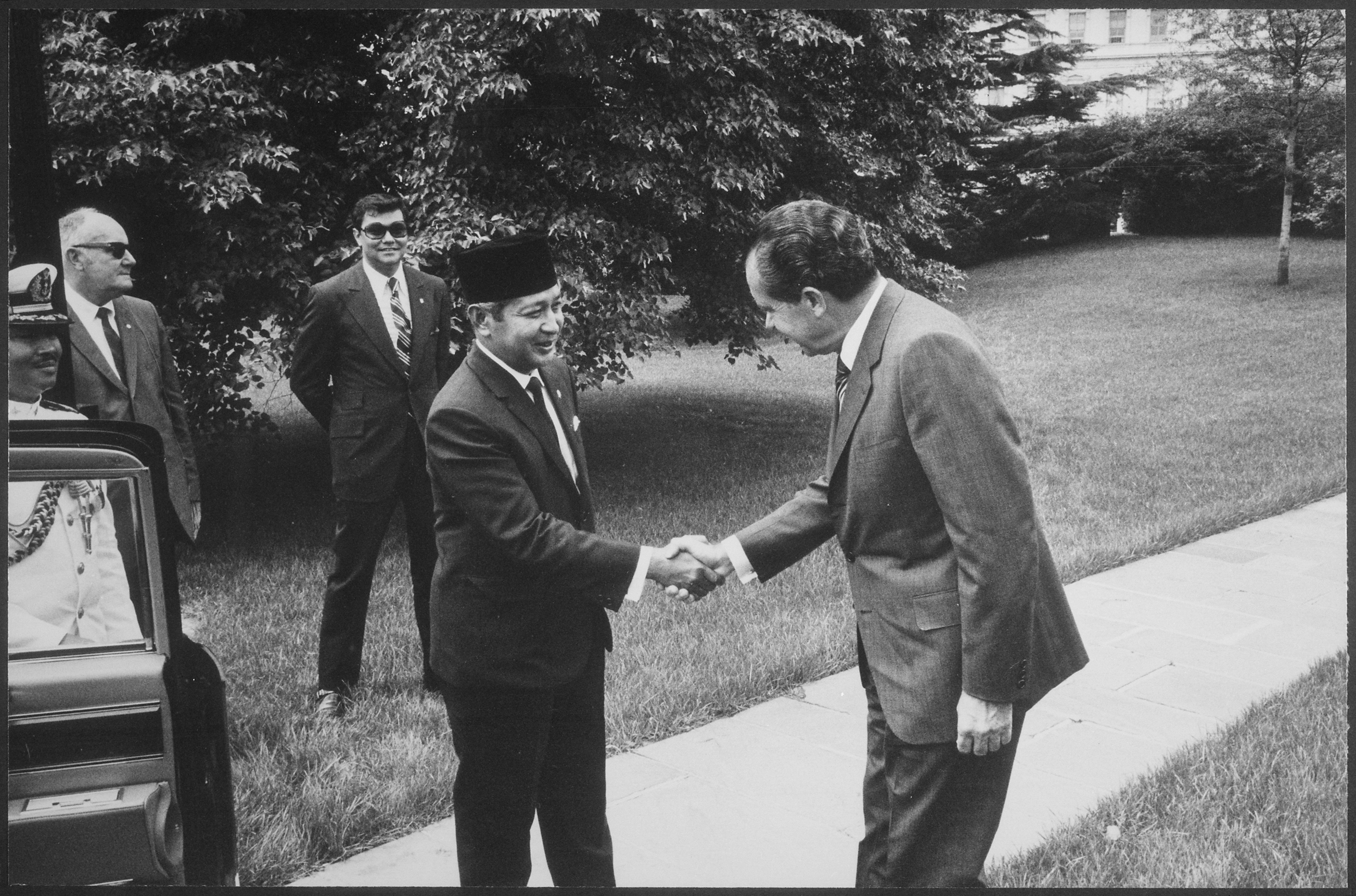

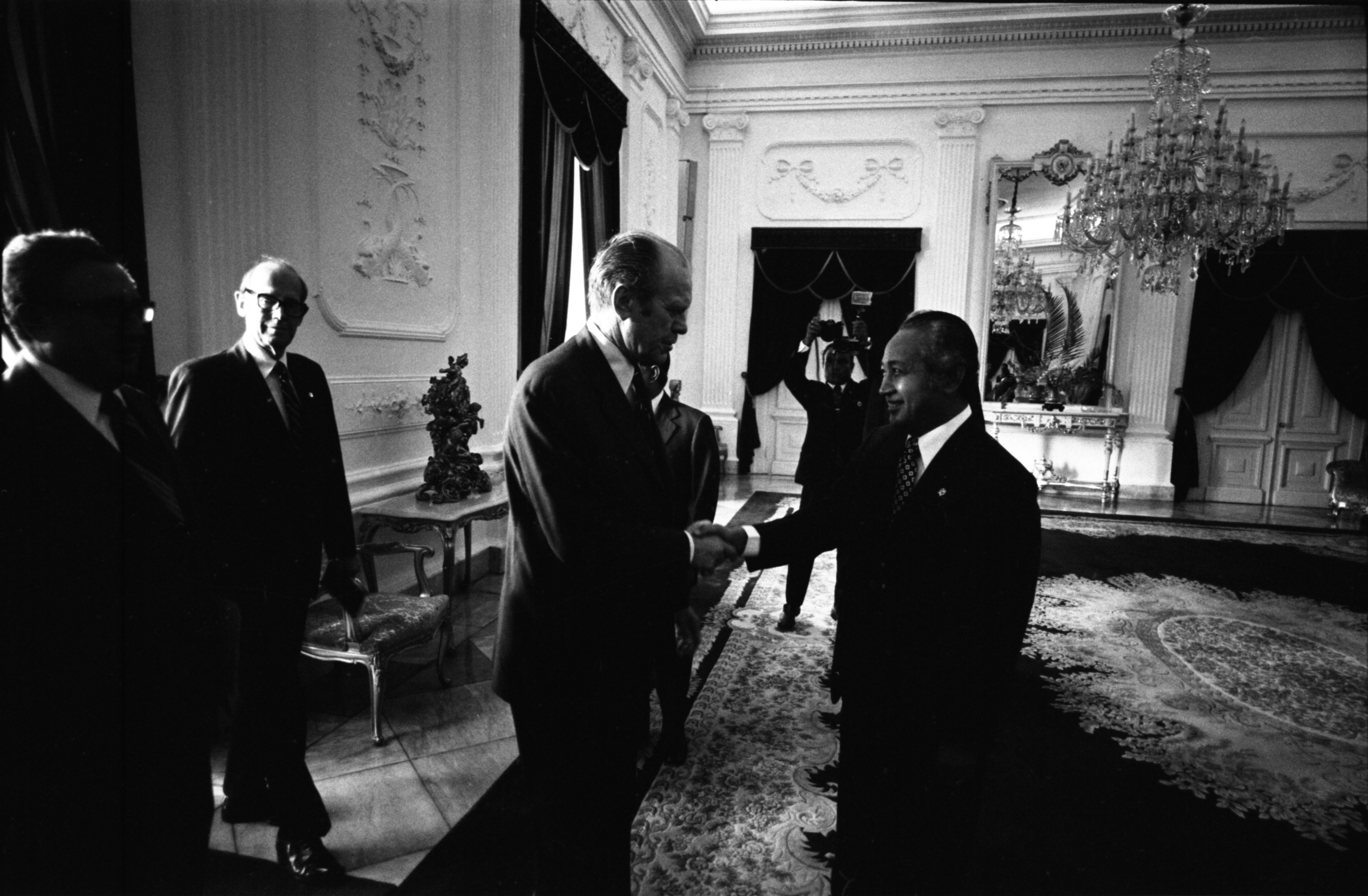

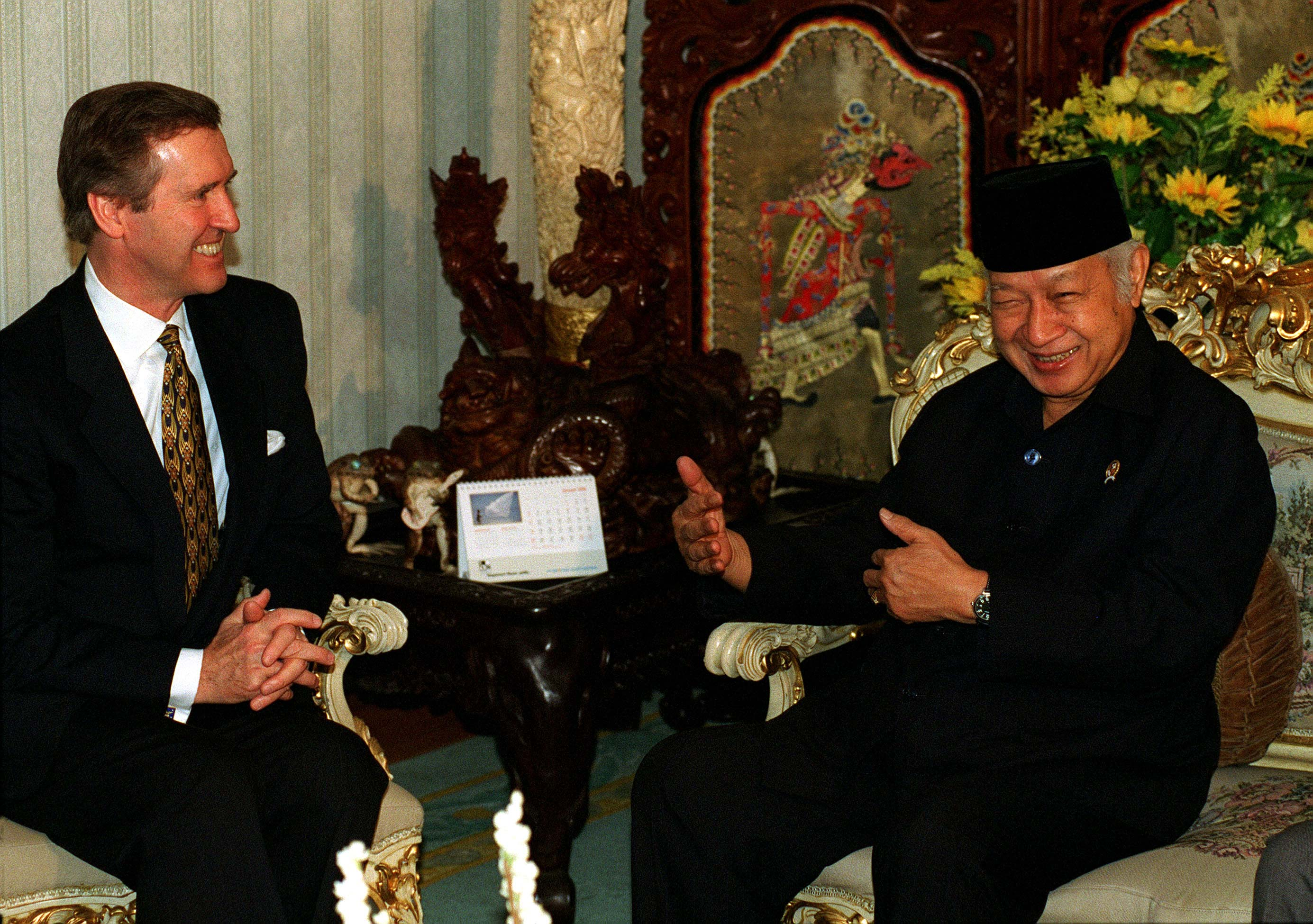

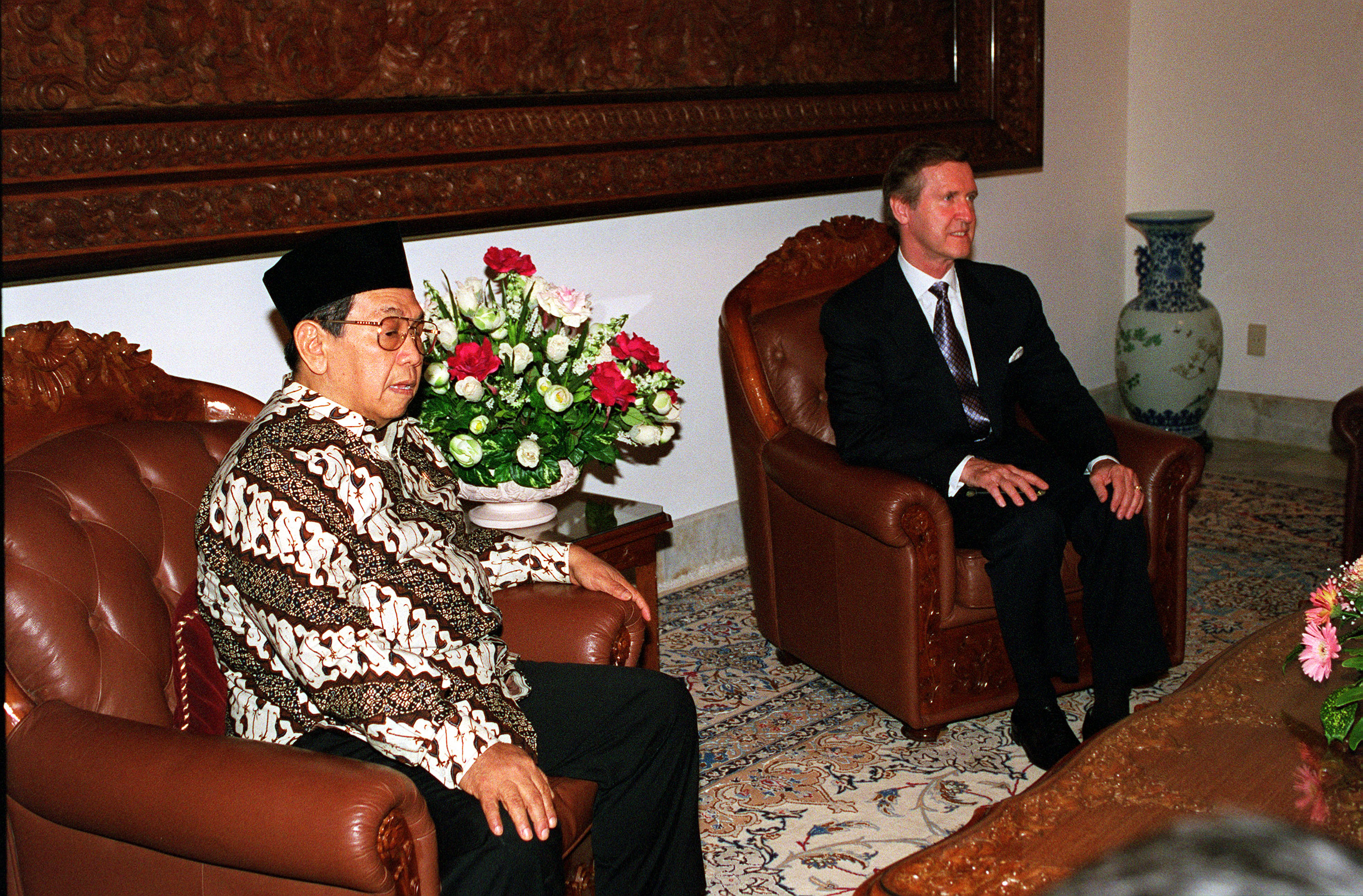

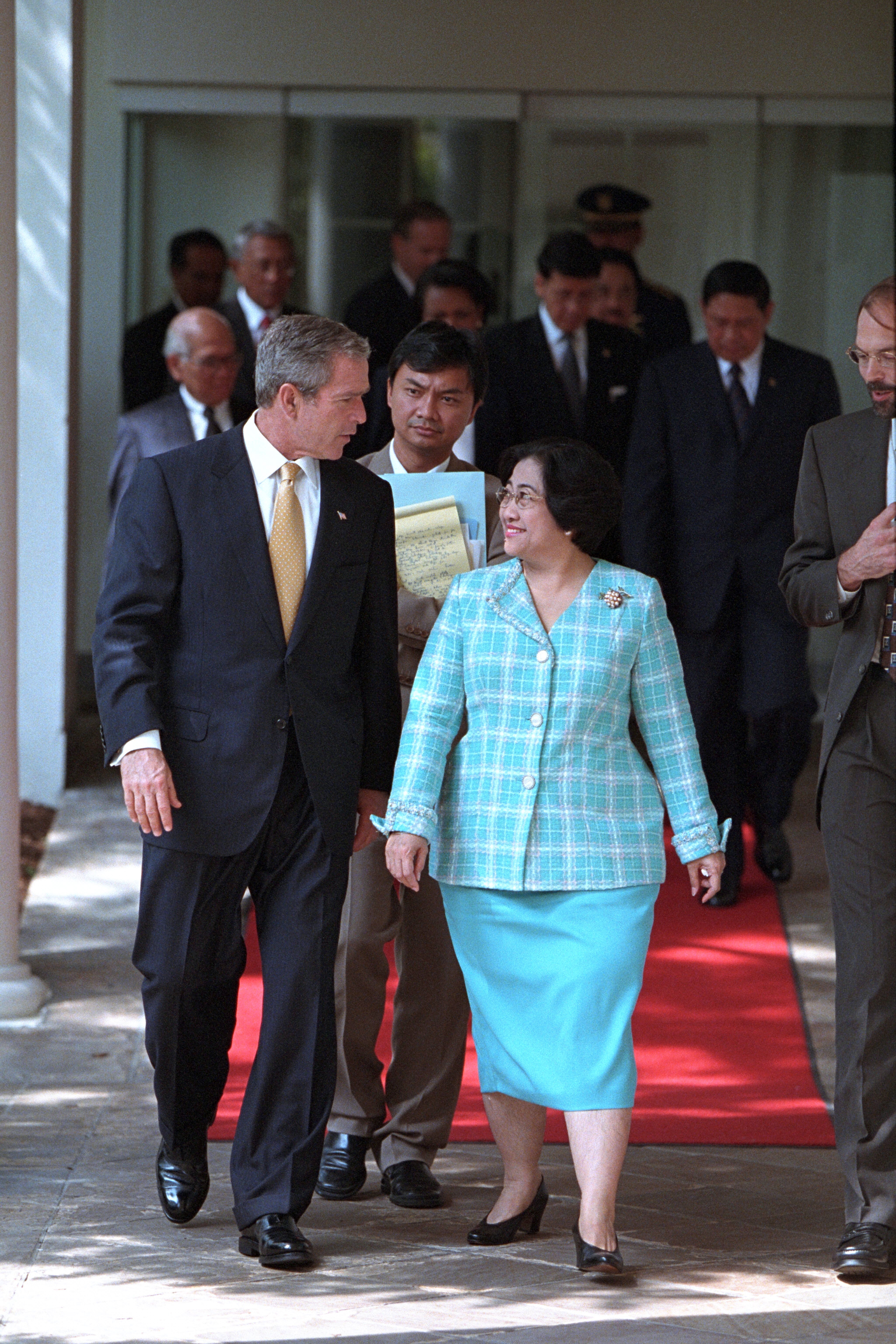

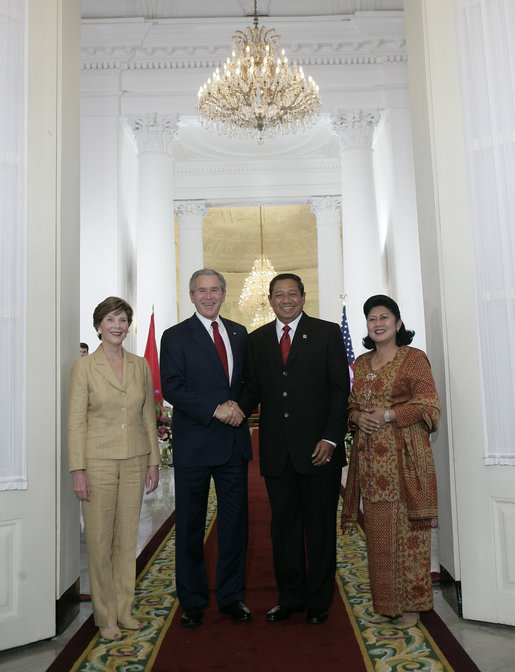

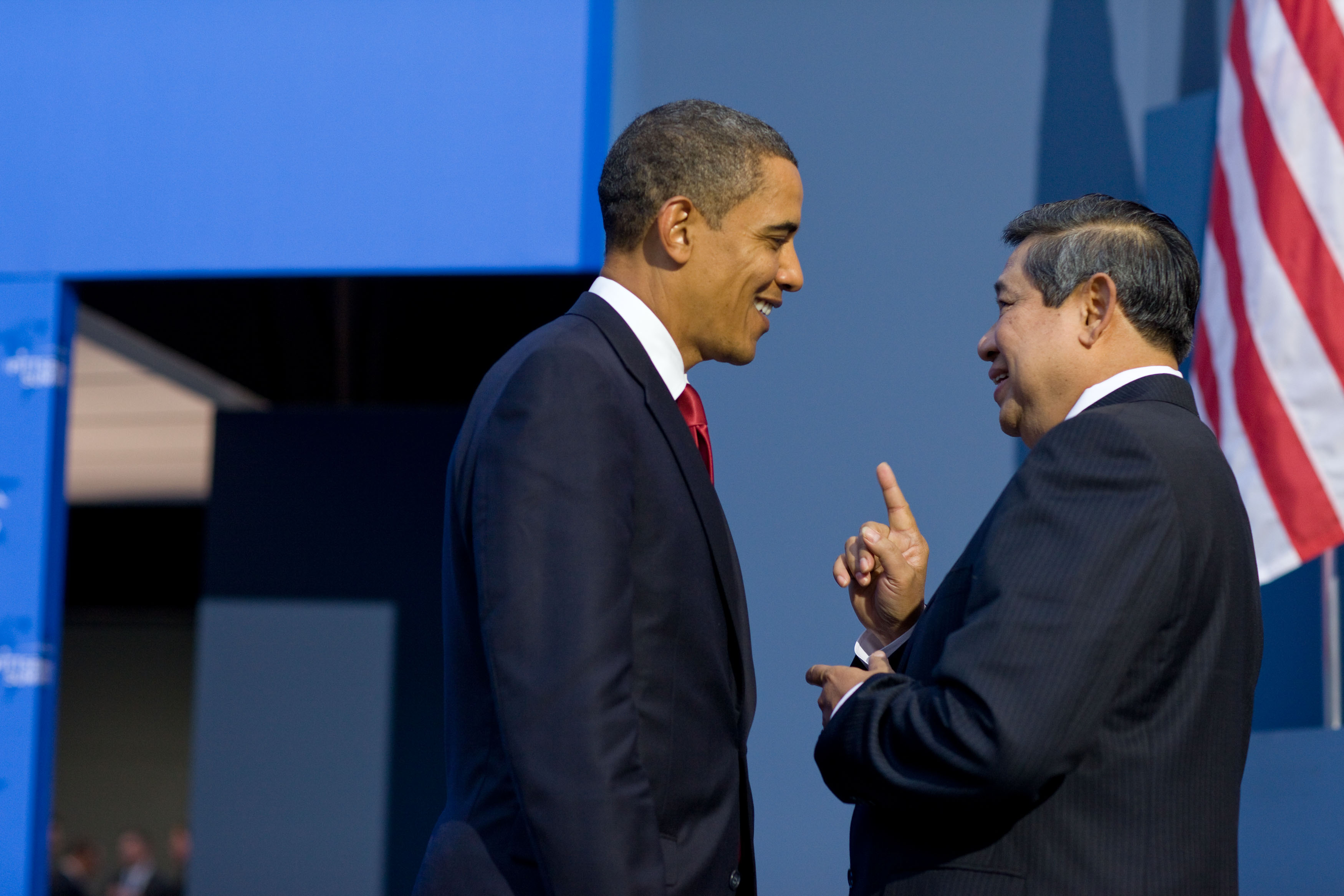

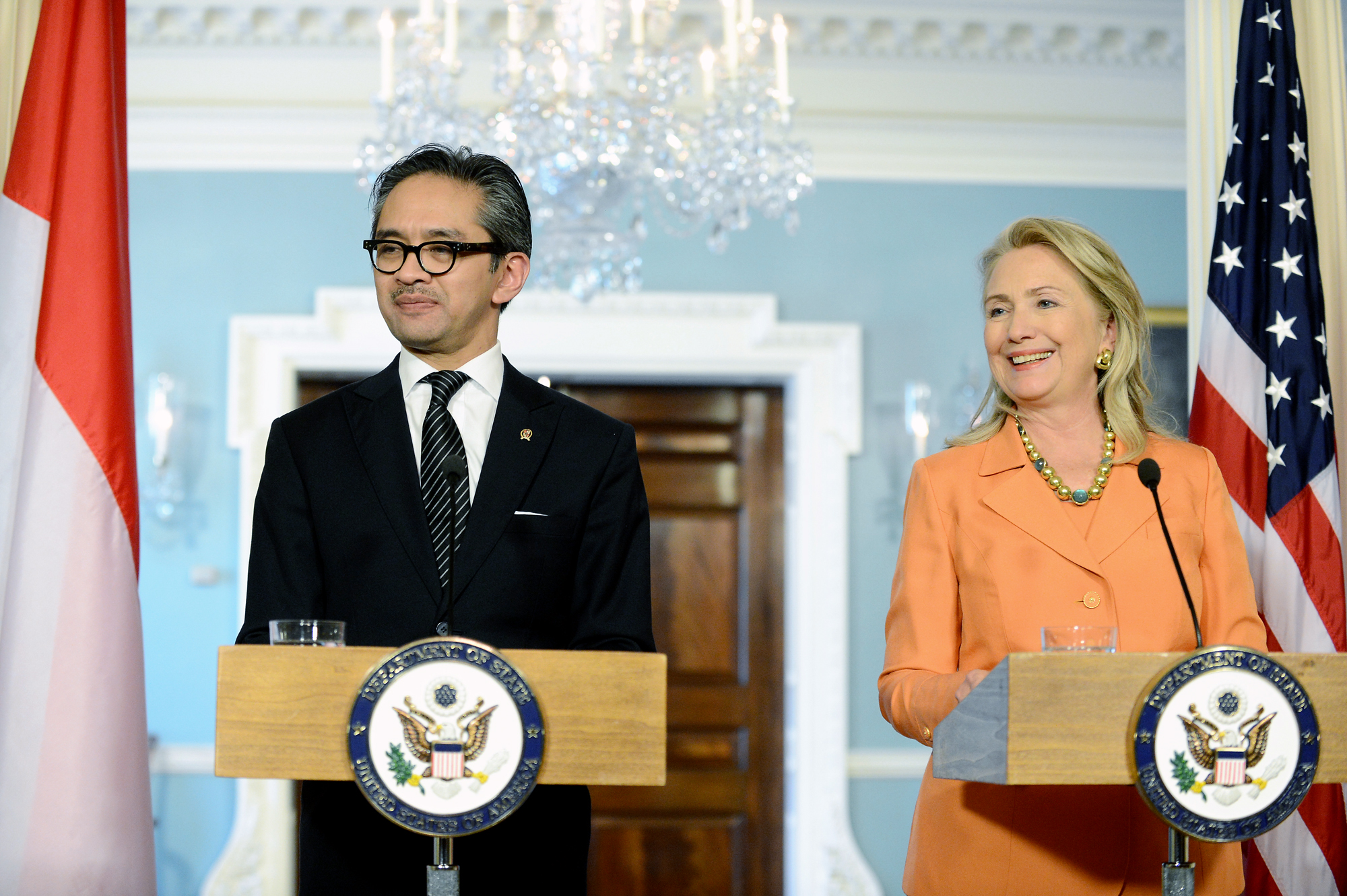

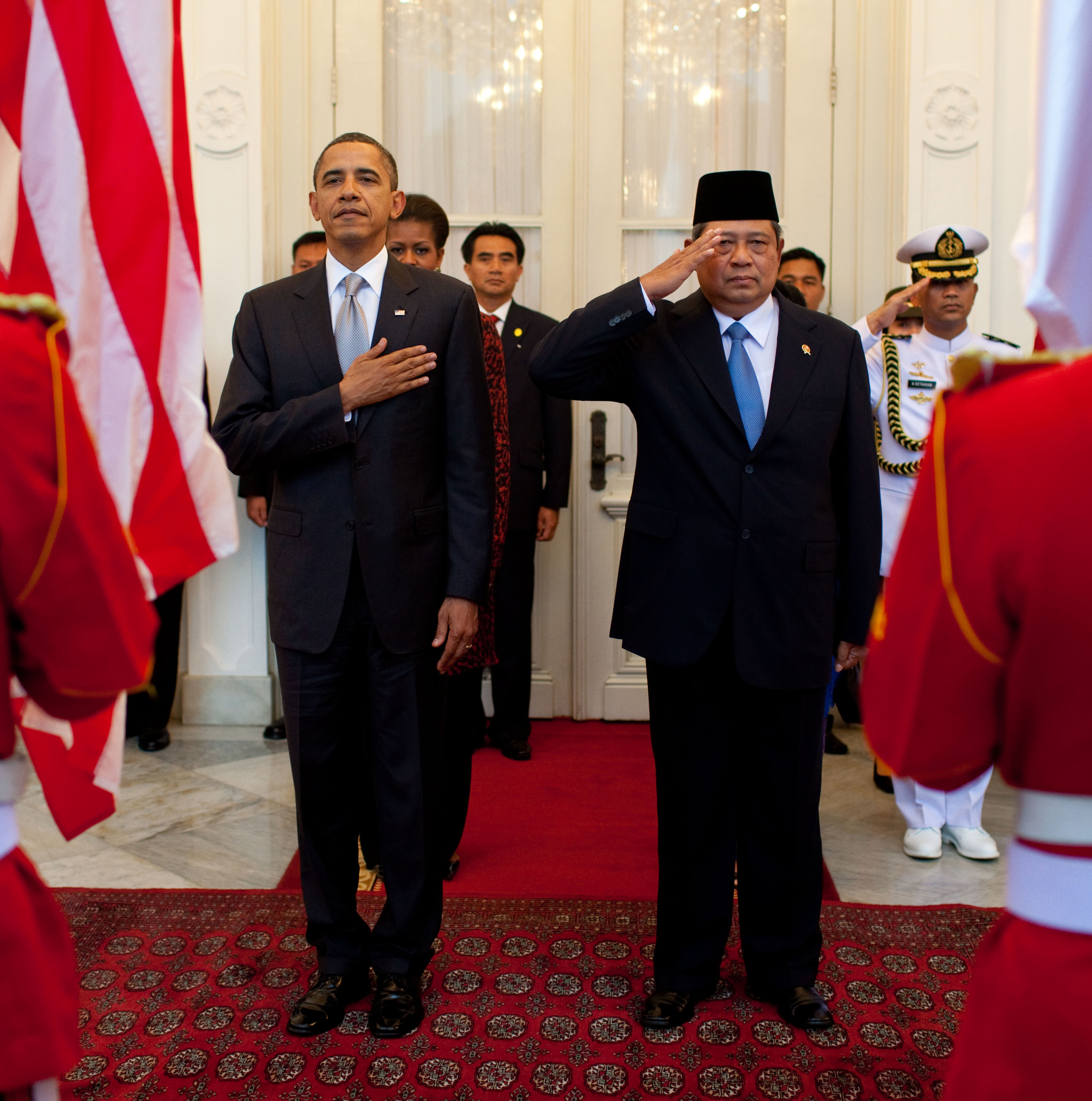

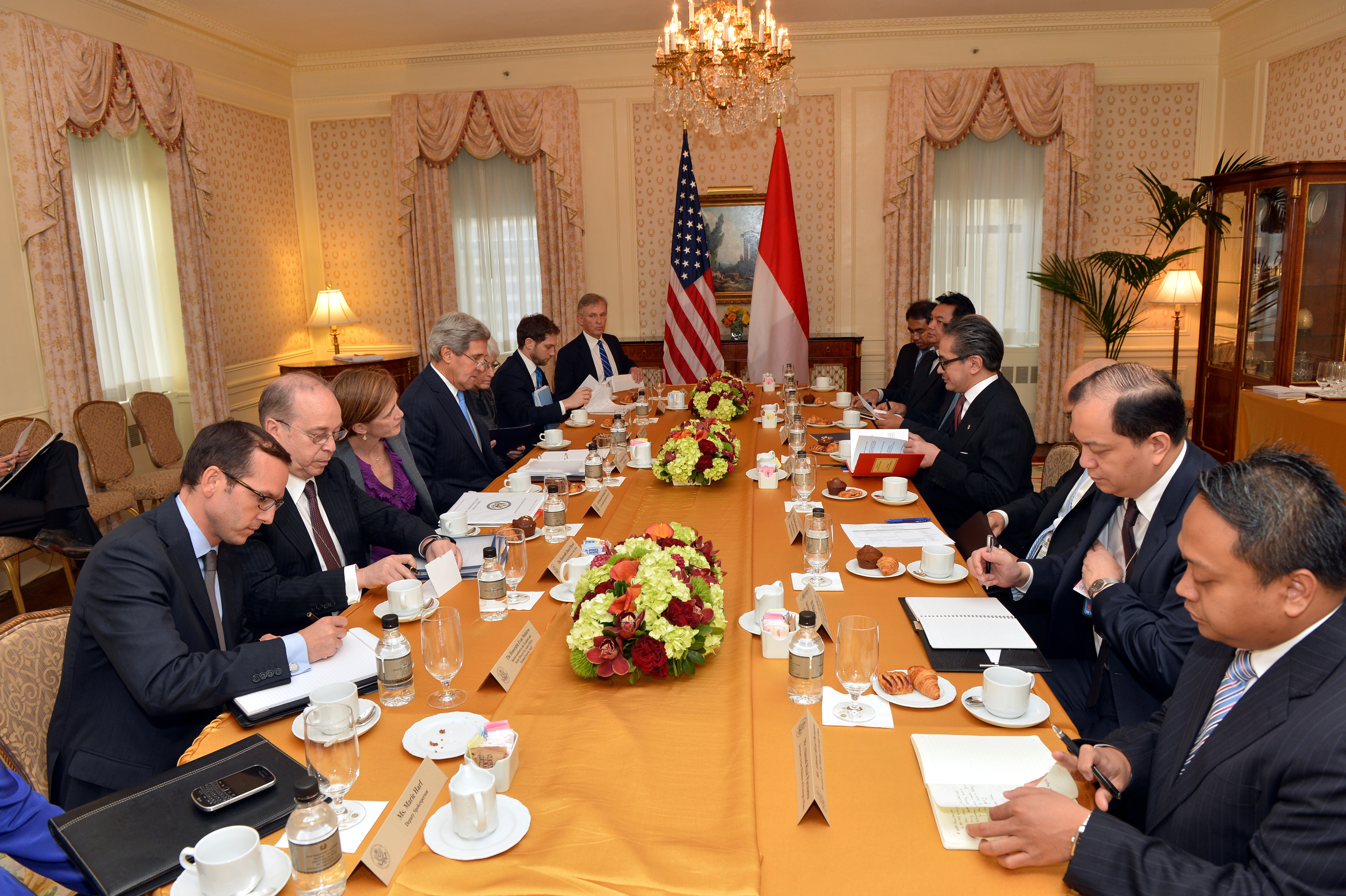

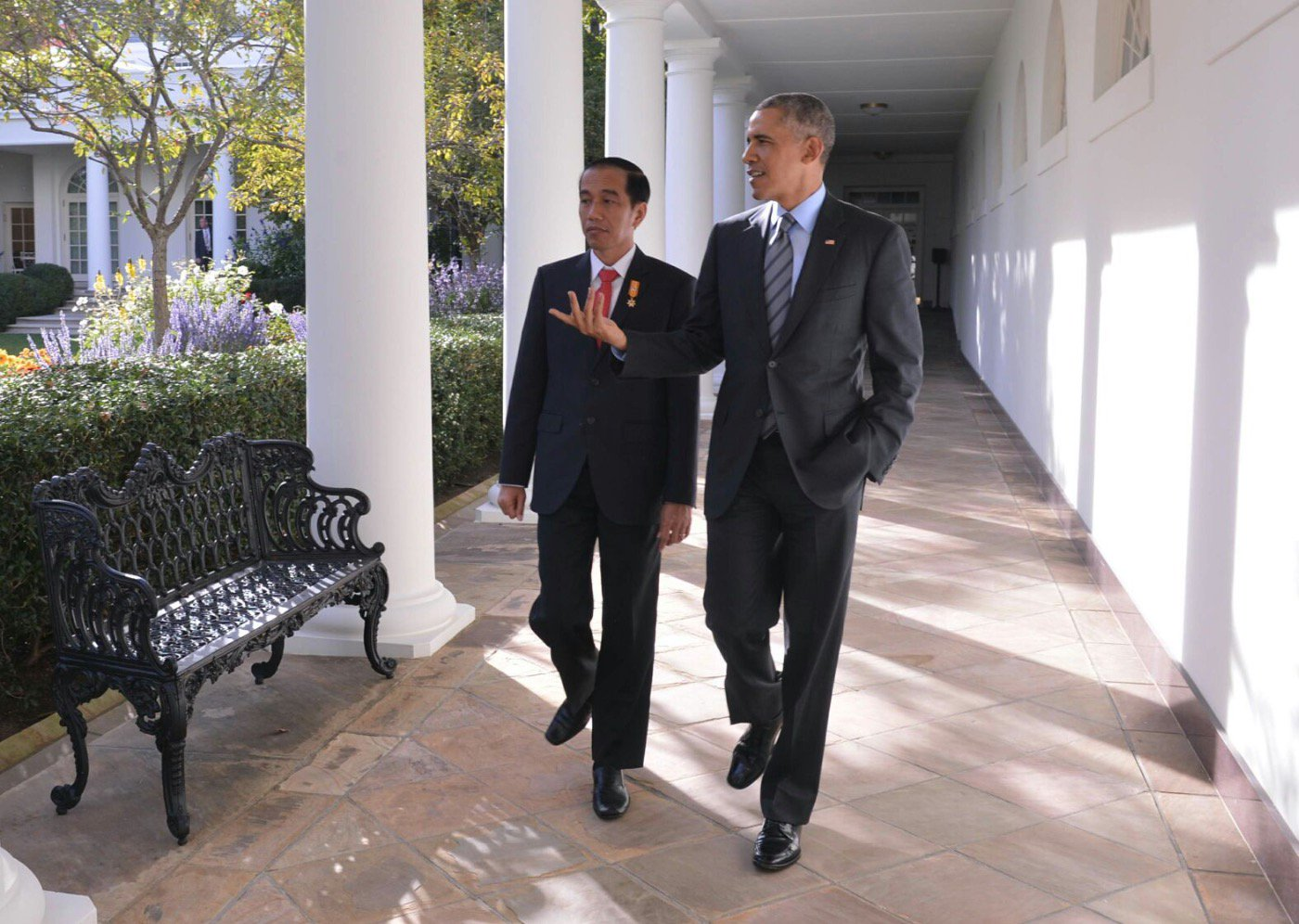

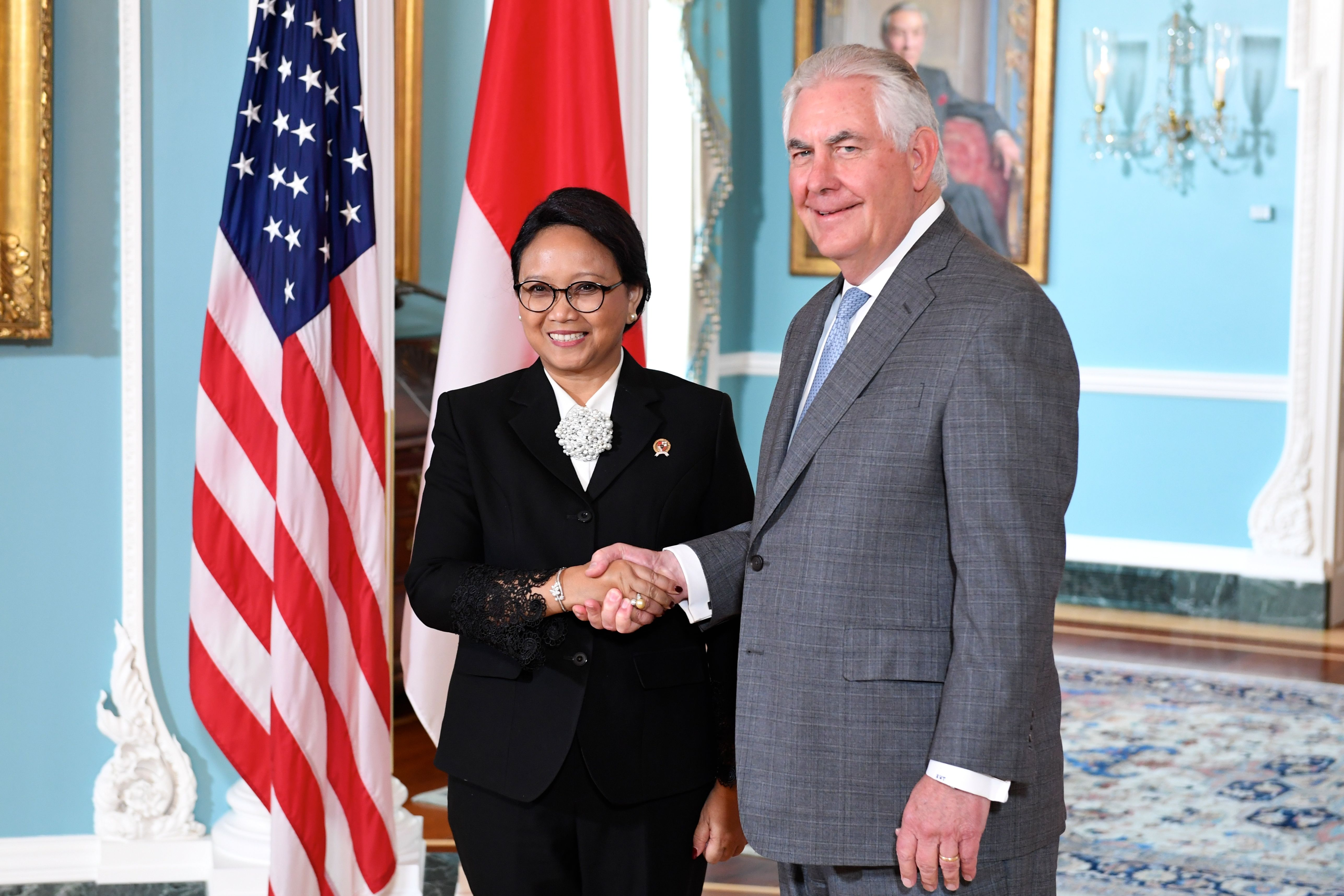

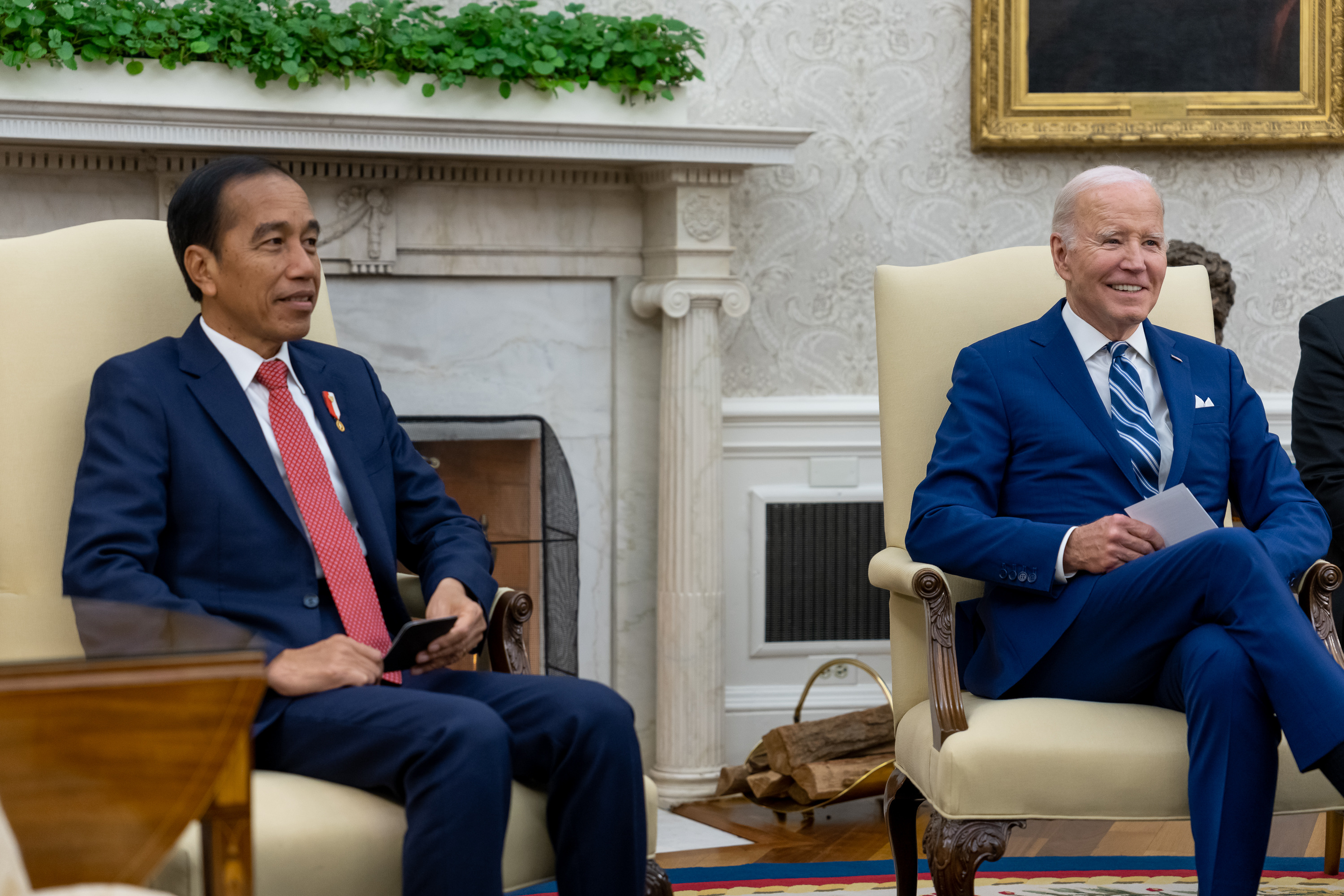

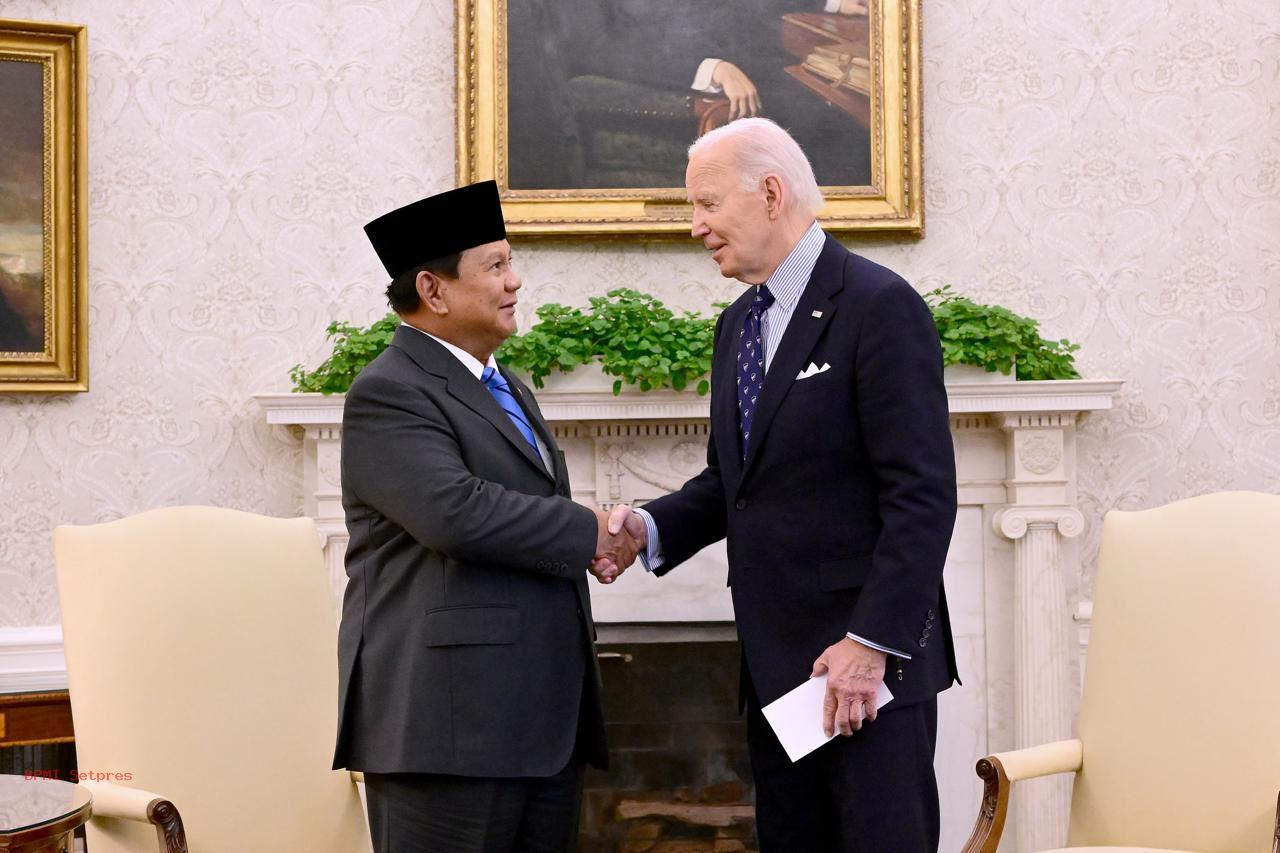

== Iran ==
Table of Trips
Start	End	Guest	Title	Reason
November 16, 1949	November 20, 1949	Mohammed Reza Pahlavi	Shah	Good will visit. Afterwards visited New York City, Princeton, West Point, Detroit, Fort Knox, Grand Canyon, Las Vegas, Phoenix, San Diego, Los Angeles, and Sun Valley Departed U.S.December 13.
November 18, 1951	November 23, 1951	Mohammed Mossadeq	Prime Minister	Discussed the Anglo-Iranian Oil Company dispute after appearing at the UN Arrived in U.S.October 8.
December 13, 1954	December 15, 1954	Mohammed Reza Pahlavi	Shah	Unofficial visit.Afterwards visited San Francisco, Sun Valley, and New York City.Departed U.S.February 11, 1955.
June 30, 1958	July 2, 1958	Mohammed Reza Pahlavi	Shah	Informal visit. In U.S.June 1 – July 3.Also visited Hawaii, San Francisco, Minneapolis, Springfield, and New York City.
October 7, 1959	October 9, 1959	Manouchehr Eghbal	Prime Minister	Attended CENTO Ministerial Meeting.
April 11, 1962	April 14, 1962	Mohammed Reza Pahlavi	Shah	State visit at Washington, D.C. and Onslow Beach. In U.S. April 10–18, visiting Cape Canaveral, Fort Bragg, and New York City.
June 5, 1964	June 5, 1964	Mohammed Reza Pahlavi	Shah	Private visit. In U.S.June 4–14; visited New York City and Los Angeles.
August 22, 1967	August 24, 1967	Mohammed Reza Pahlavi	Shah	Official visit. Arrived in New York City August 21.
June 12, 1968	June 12, 1968	Mohammed Reza Pahlavi	Shah	Private visit. In U.S.June 10–16; visited New York City, St. Louis, Cambridge, and Chicago.
December 5, 1968	December 6, 1968	Amir Abbas Hoveyda	Prime Minister	Official visit. In U.S.December 3–16; visited New York City, Cape Kennedy, Palm Beach, Los Angeles, and Honolulu, Hawaii.
March 31, 1969	April 1, 1969	Mohammad Reza Pahlavi	Shah	Attended funeral of former President Eisenhower; met with President Nixon April 1.
October 21, 1969	October 23, 1969	Mohammad Reza Pahlavi	Shah	Official visit. In U.S.October 17; visited Williamsburg and New York City.
July 24, 1973	July 26, 1973	Mohammad Reza Pahlavi	Shah	State visit. In U.S.July 23–27; visited Williamsburg.
May 15, 1975	May 18, 1975	Mohammad Reza Pahlavi	Shah	State visit. In U.S.May 15; visited Williamsburg.
November 15, 1977	November 16, 1977	Mohammad Reza Pahlavi	Shah	State visit. In U.S.November 14; visited Williamsburg.

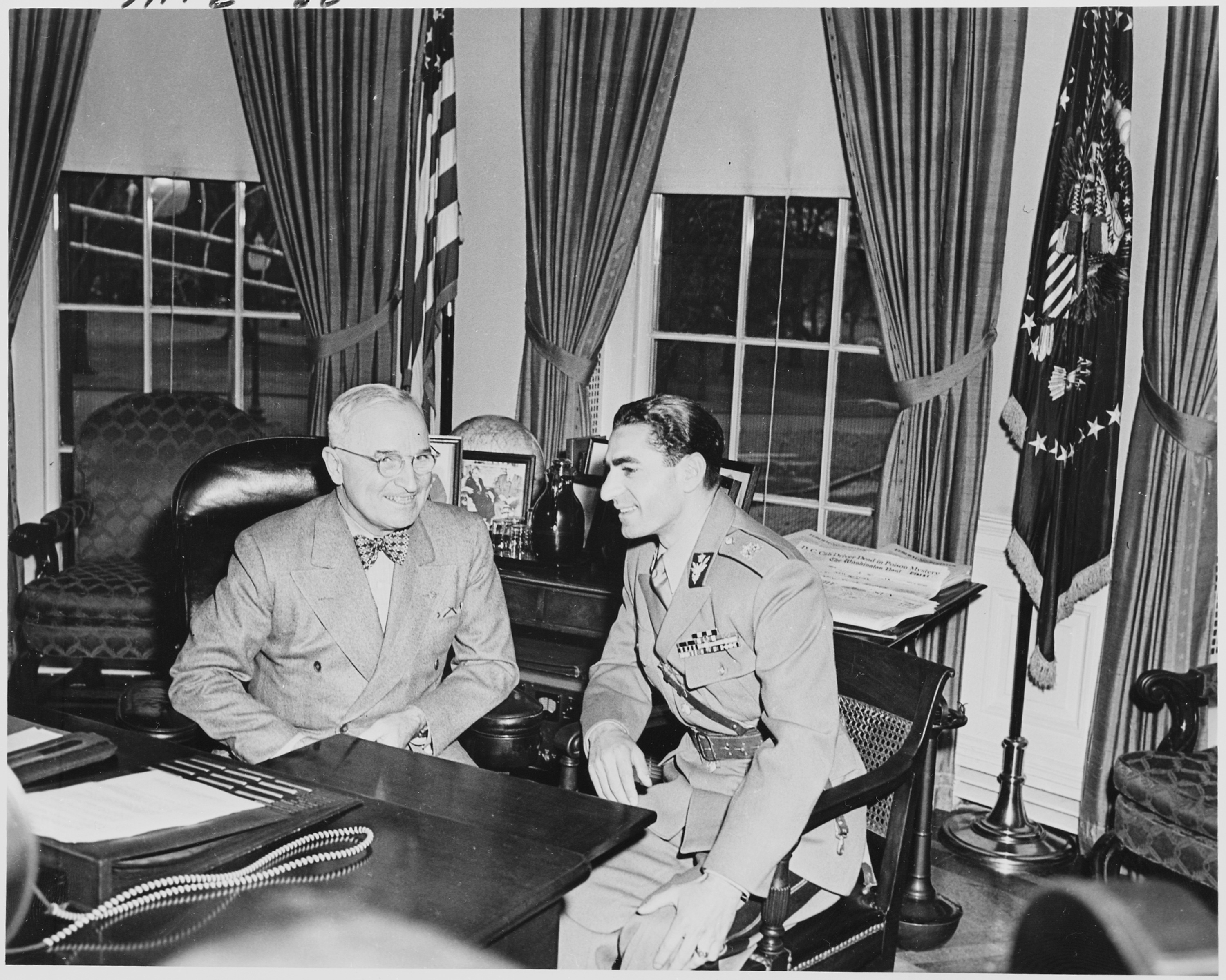

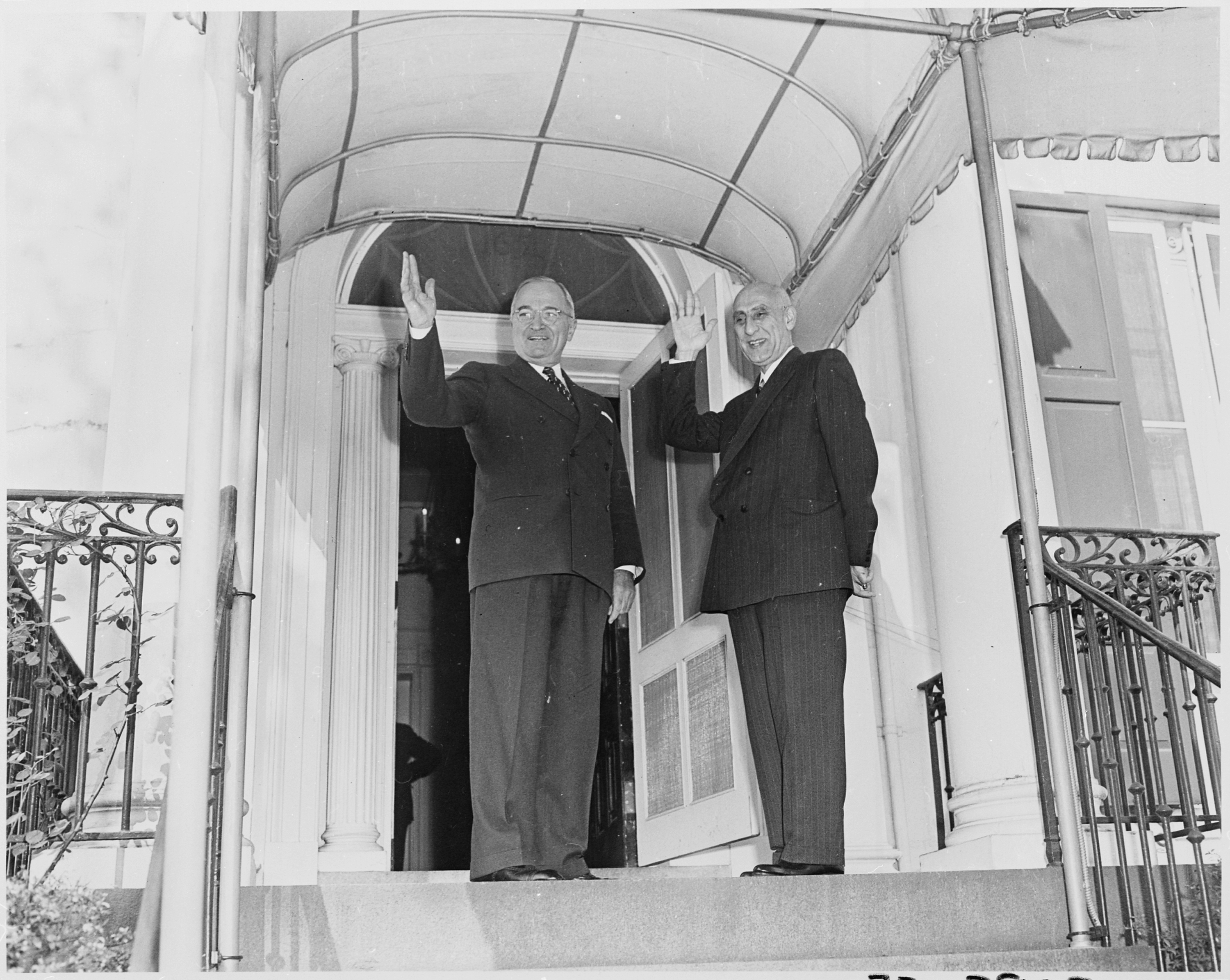

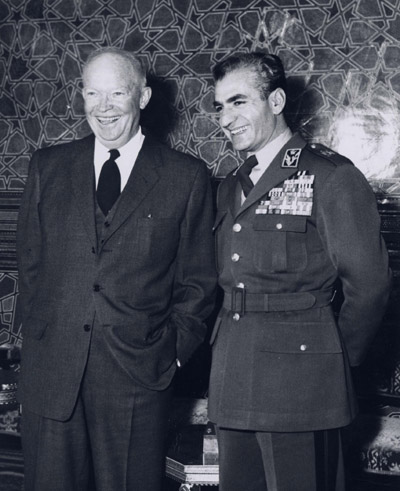

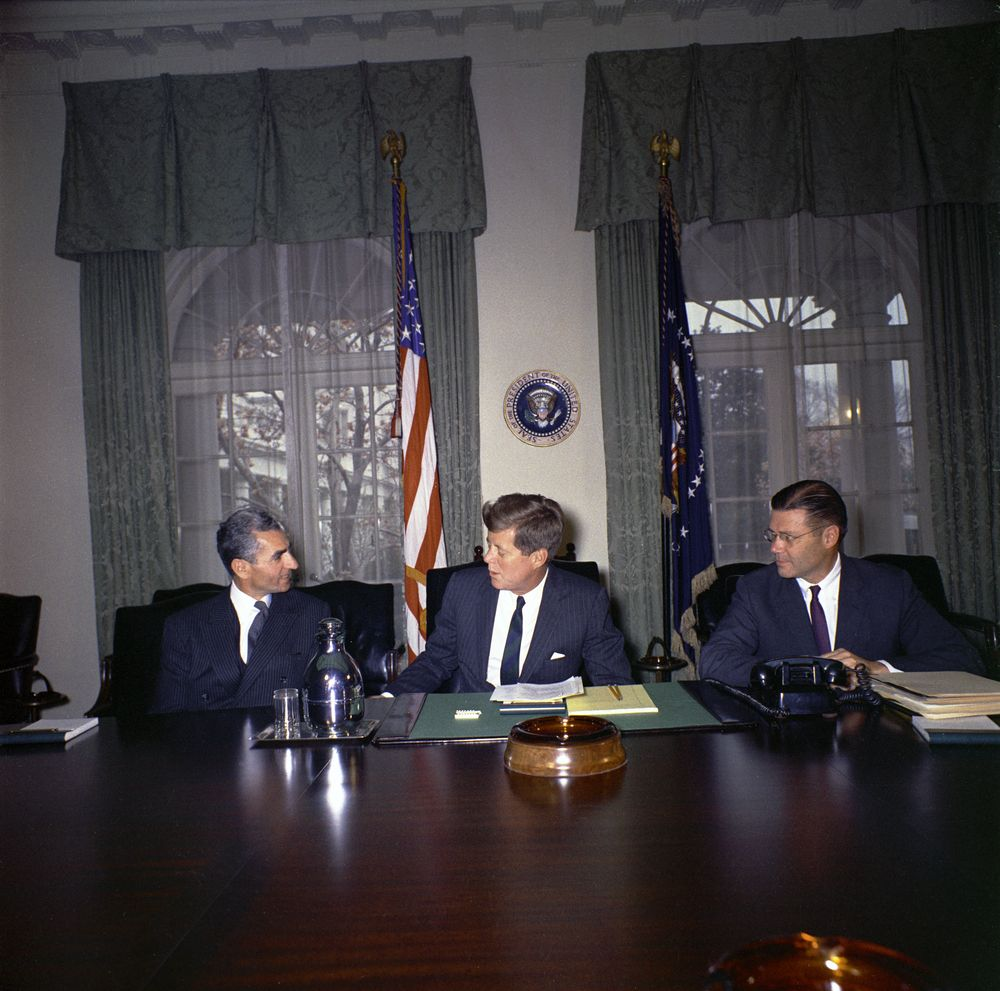

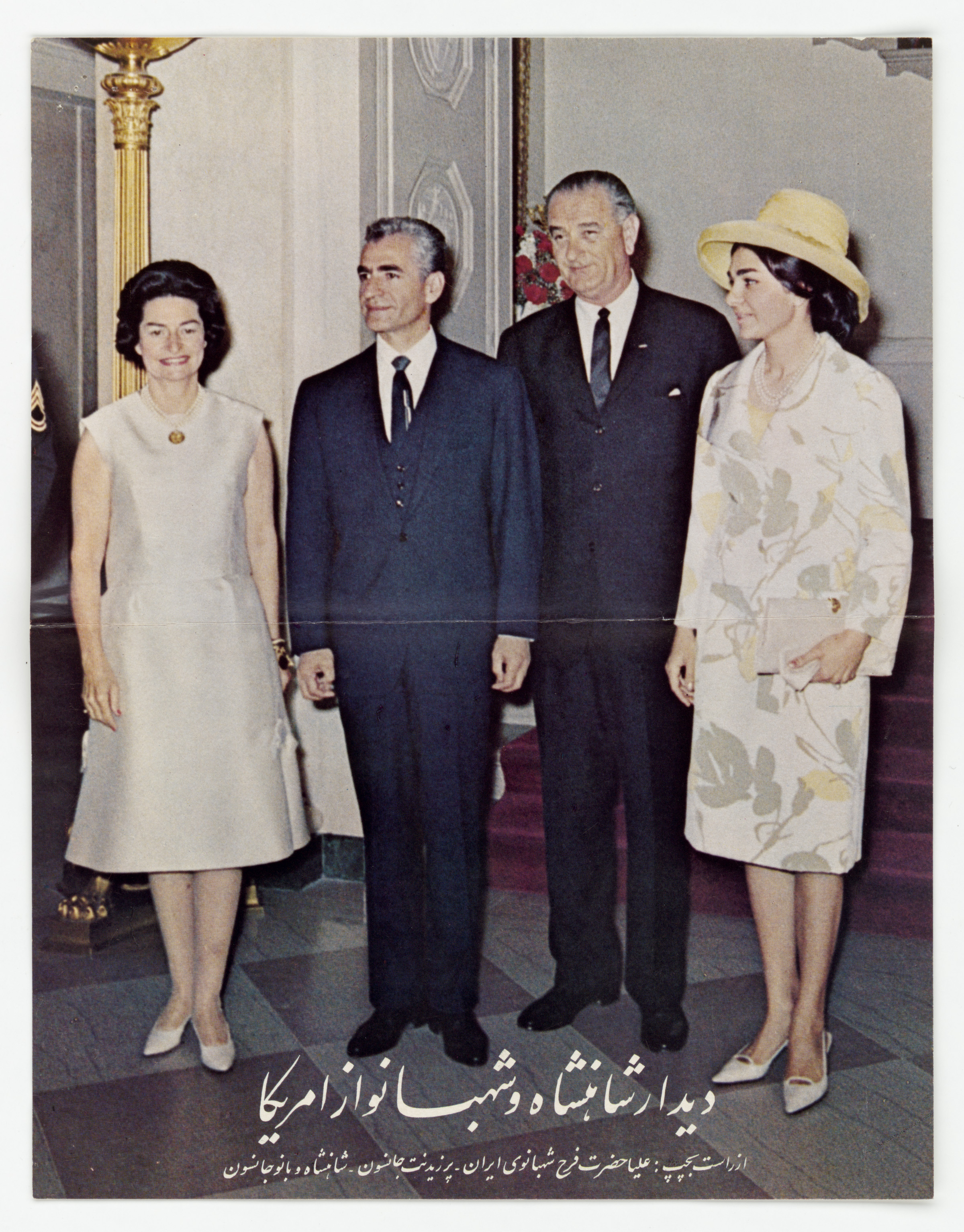

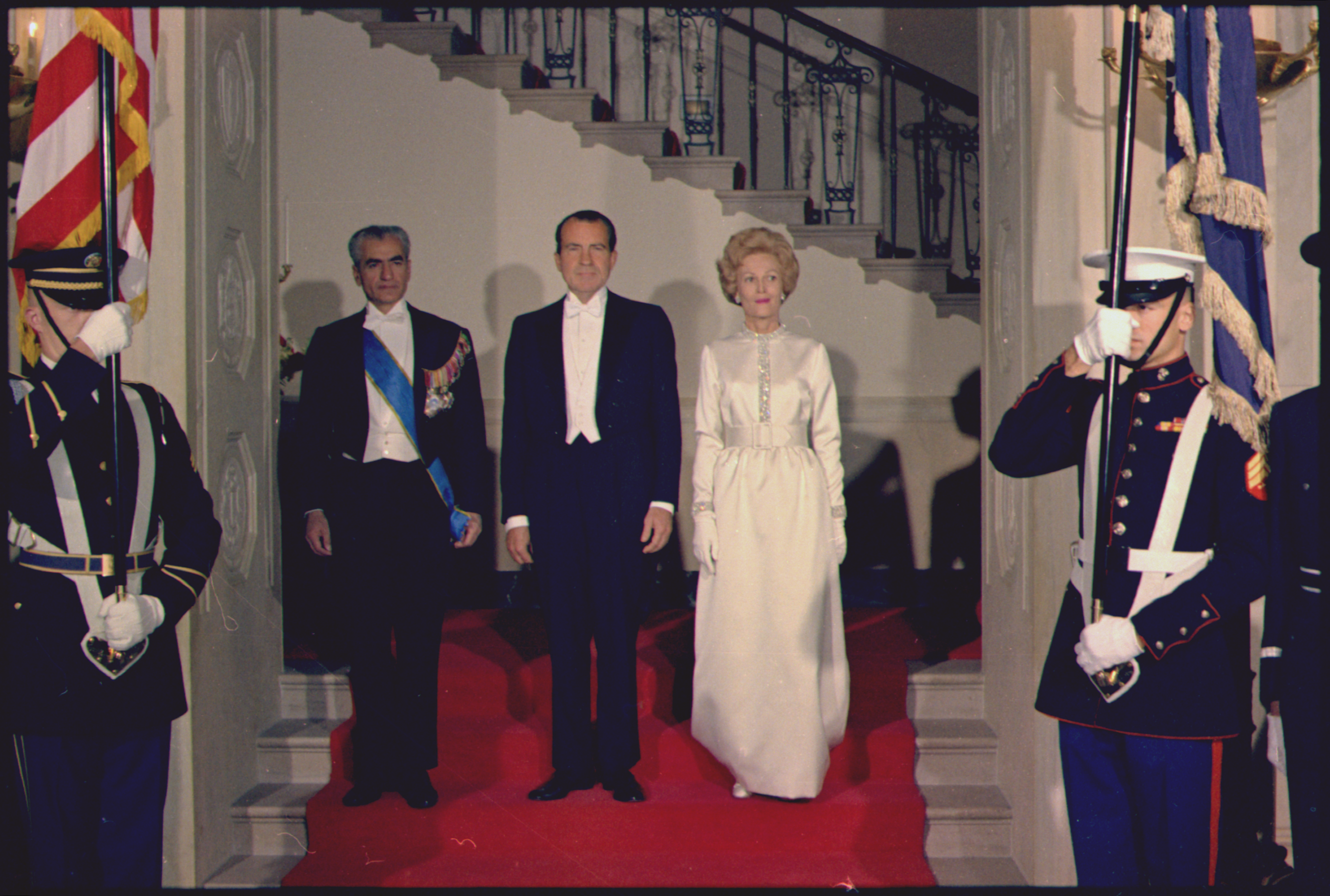

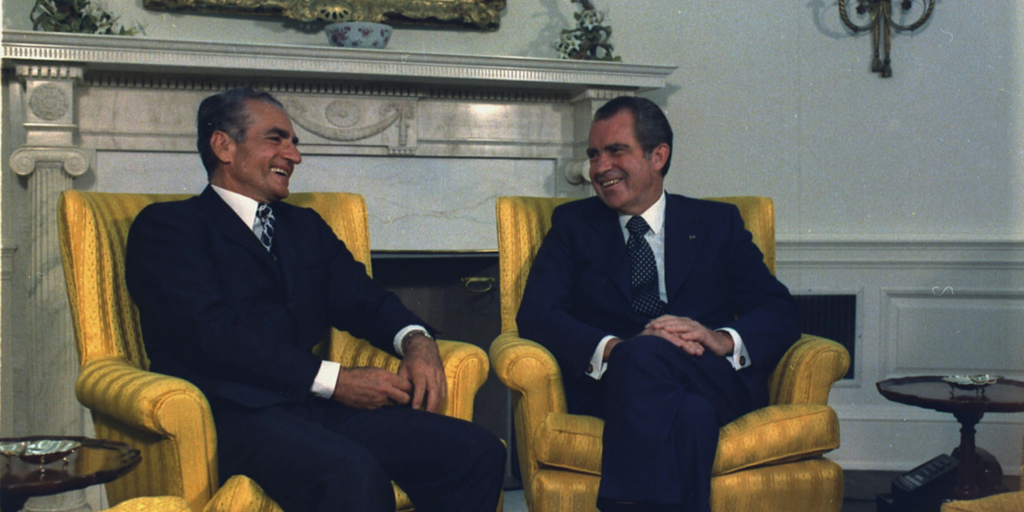

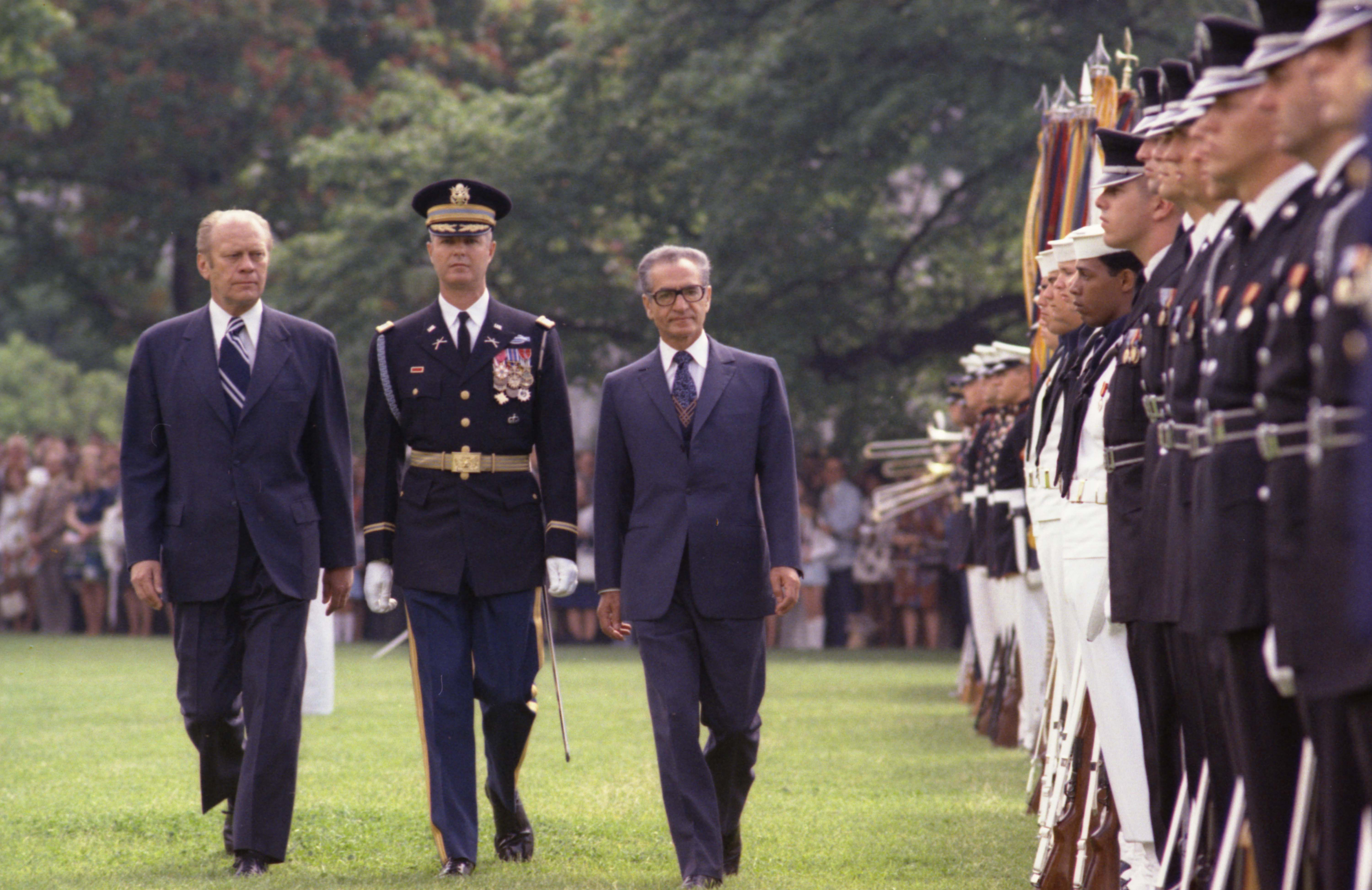

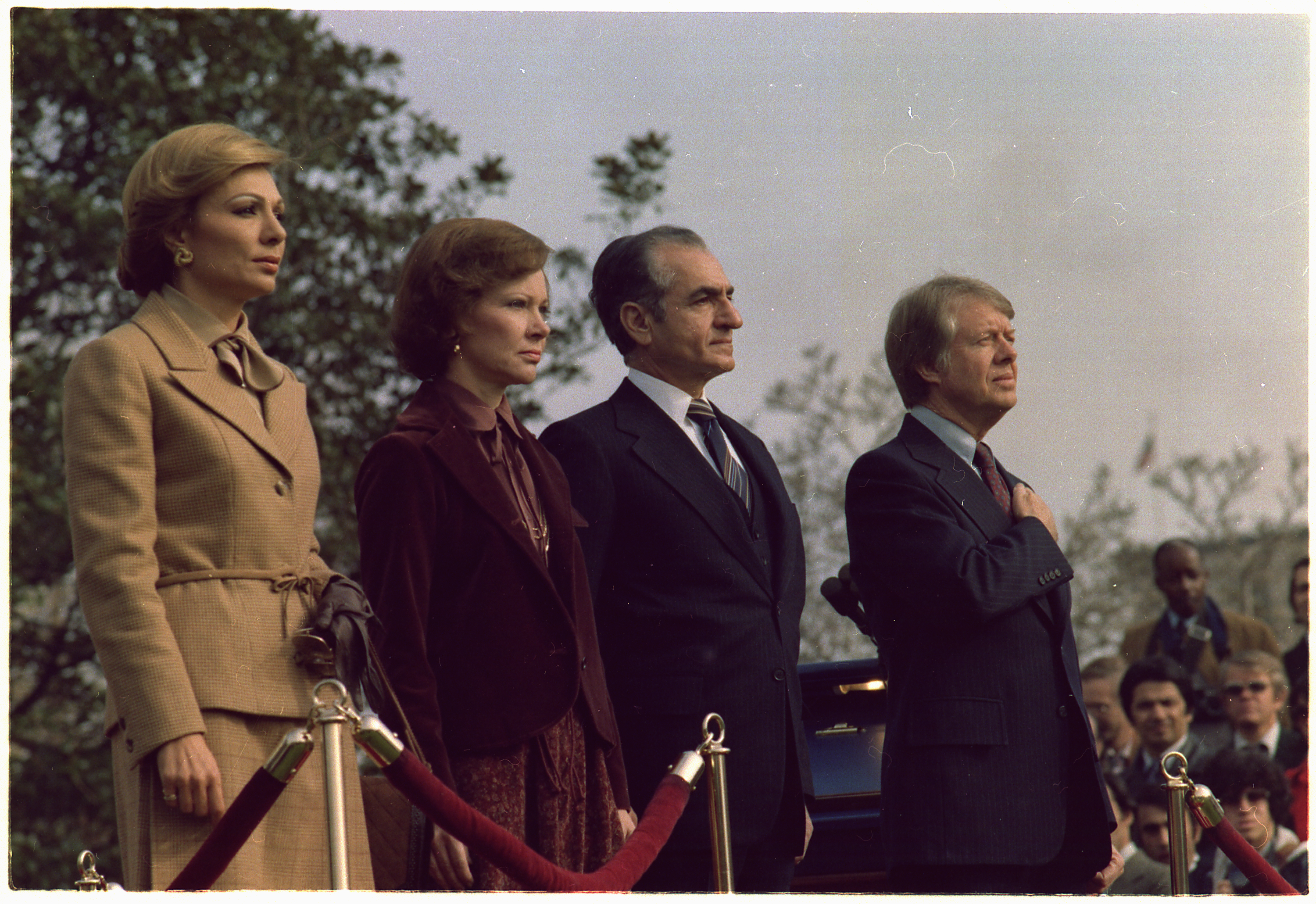

== Iraq ==
Table of Trips
Start	End	Guest	Title	Reason
May 28, 1945	June 1, 1945	Abdul Ilah	Regent	At invitation of the President. In U.S. May 25 – June 27. Afterwards visited New York City, Princeton, Grand Canyon, Las Vegas, Colorado Springs, Lincoln, and Chicago.
August 16, 1952	August 18, 1952	Faisal II	King	Informal, unofficial visit. In U.S. August 12 – September 17. Visited New York City, Detroit, Chicago, Denver, San Francisco, Las Vegas, Phoenix, Muscle Shoals, and Fort Knox.
January 20, 2004	January 20, 2004	Adnan Pachachi	President	Working visit.
June 9, 2004	June 11, 2004	Ghazi Mashal Ajil al-Yawer	President	Working visit. Met with President Bush during the G-8 Economic Summit at Sea Island. Met with members of Congress and attended the funeral of Former President Reagan, June 10–11.
September 21, 2004	September 24, 2004	Iyad Allawi	Prime Minister	Met with President Bush at the UN General Assembly in New York City. Addressed a Joint session of Congress September 23.Returned to the UN afterward.
December 3, 2004	December 9, 2004	Ghazi Mashal Ajil al-Yawer	President	Working visit.
June 23, 2005	June 24, 2005	Ibrahim al-Jafari	Prime Minister	Working visit.
September 8, 2005	September 13, 2005	Jalal Talabani	President	Working visit.
July 24, 2006	July 26, 2006	Nouri al-Maliki	Prime Minister	Working visit. Addressed Joint session of the United States Congress July 26.
September 19, 2006	September 19, 2006	Jalal Talabani	President	Met with President Bush at the UN General Assembly in New York City.
May 30, 2007	June 1, 2007	Jalal Talabani	President	Working visit.
September 25, 2007	September 25, 2007	Nouri al-Maliki	Prime Minister	Met with President Bush at the UN General Assembly in New York City.
September 29, 2007	October 7, 2007	Jalal Talabani	President	Working visit.
June 21, 2008	June 27, 2008	Jalal Talabani	President	Working visit.
September 10, 2008	September 10, 2008	Jalal Talabani	President	Working visit.
September 23, 2008	September 23, 2008	Jalal Talabani	President	Met with President Bush at the UN General Assembly in New York City.
June 22, 2009	June 22, 2009	Nouri al-Maliki	Prime Minister	Working visit.
October 6, 2009	October 6, 2009	Jalal Talabani	President	Working visit.
October 20, 2009	October 20, 2009	Nouri al-Maliki	Prime Minister	Working visit.
October 31, 2013	November 1, 2013	Nouri al-Maliki	Prime Minister	Working visit.
September 23, 2014	September 23, 2014	Haidar al-Abadi	Prime Minister	Met with President Obama at the UN General Assembly in New York City.
April 14, 2015	April 14, 2015	Haidar al-Abadi	Prime Minister	Official Working visit.
March 20, 2017	March 20, 2017	Haidar al-Abadi	Prime Minister	Official Working visit.
August 20, 2020	August 20, 2020	Mustafa Al-Kadhimi	Prime Minister	Official Working visit.
July 23, 2021	July 23, 2021	Mustafa Al-Kadhimi	Prime Minister	Working visit.
July 14, 2026	July 14, 2026	Ali al-Zaidi	Prime Minister	Working visit.

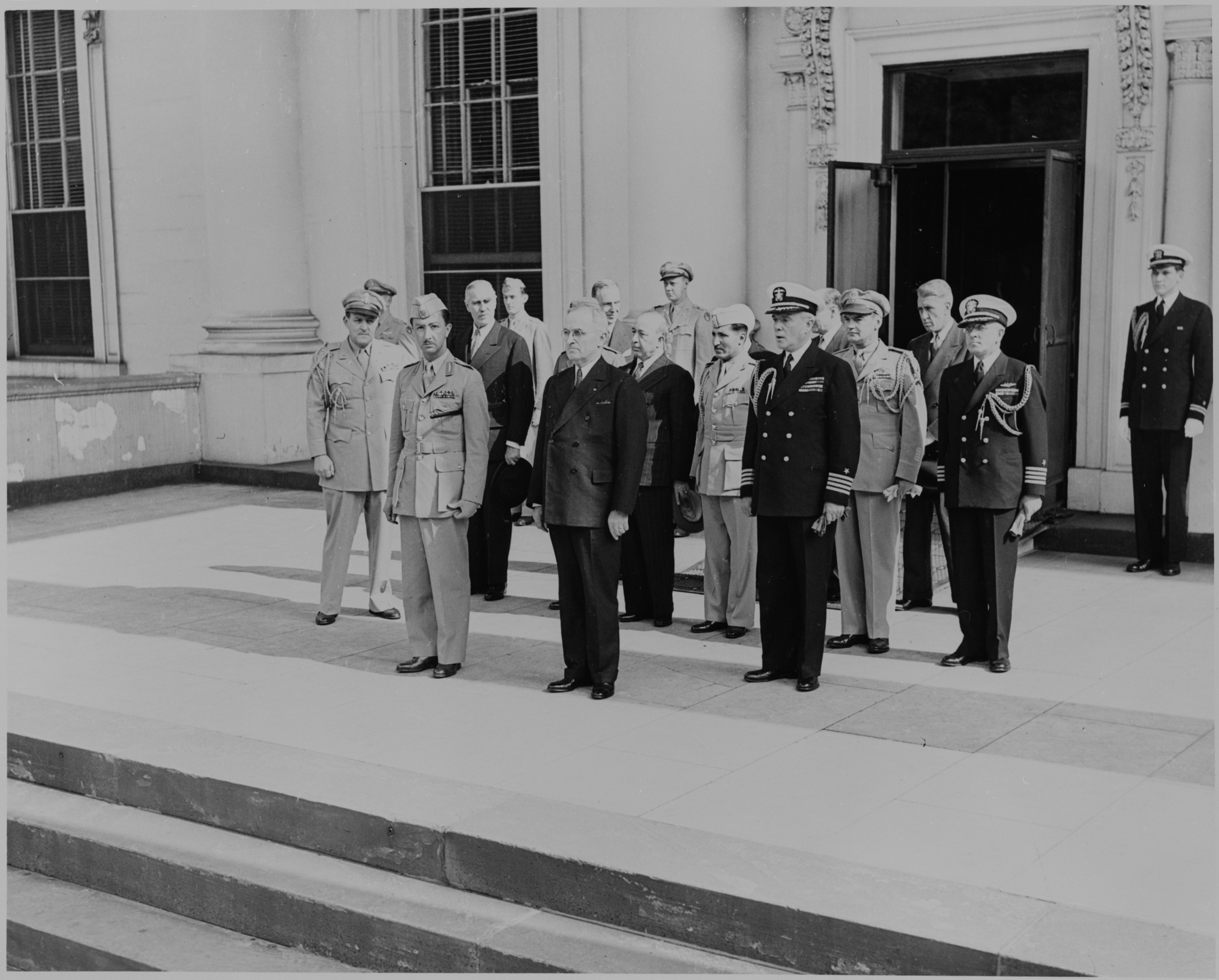

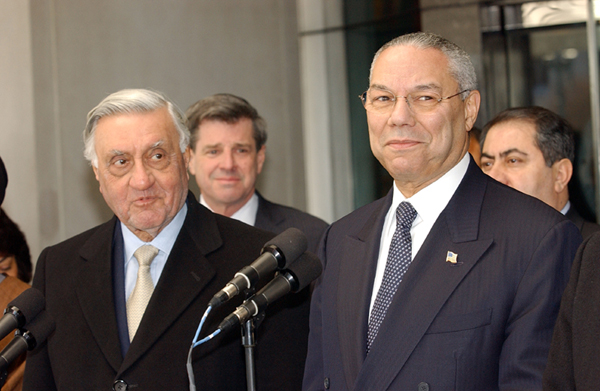

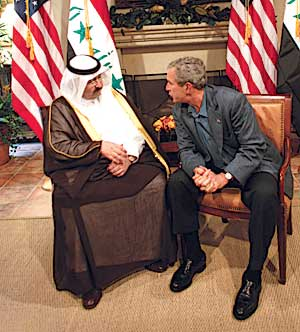

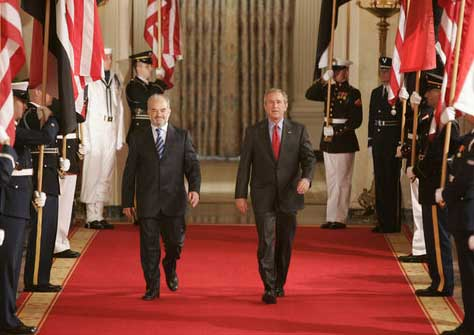

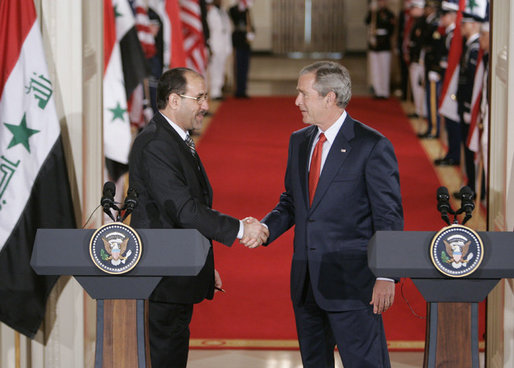

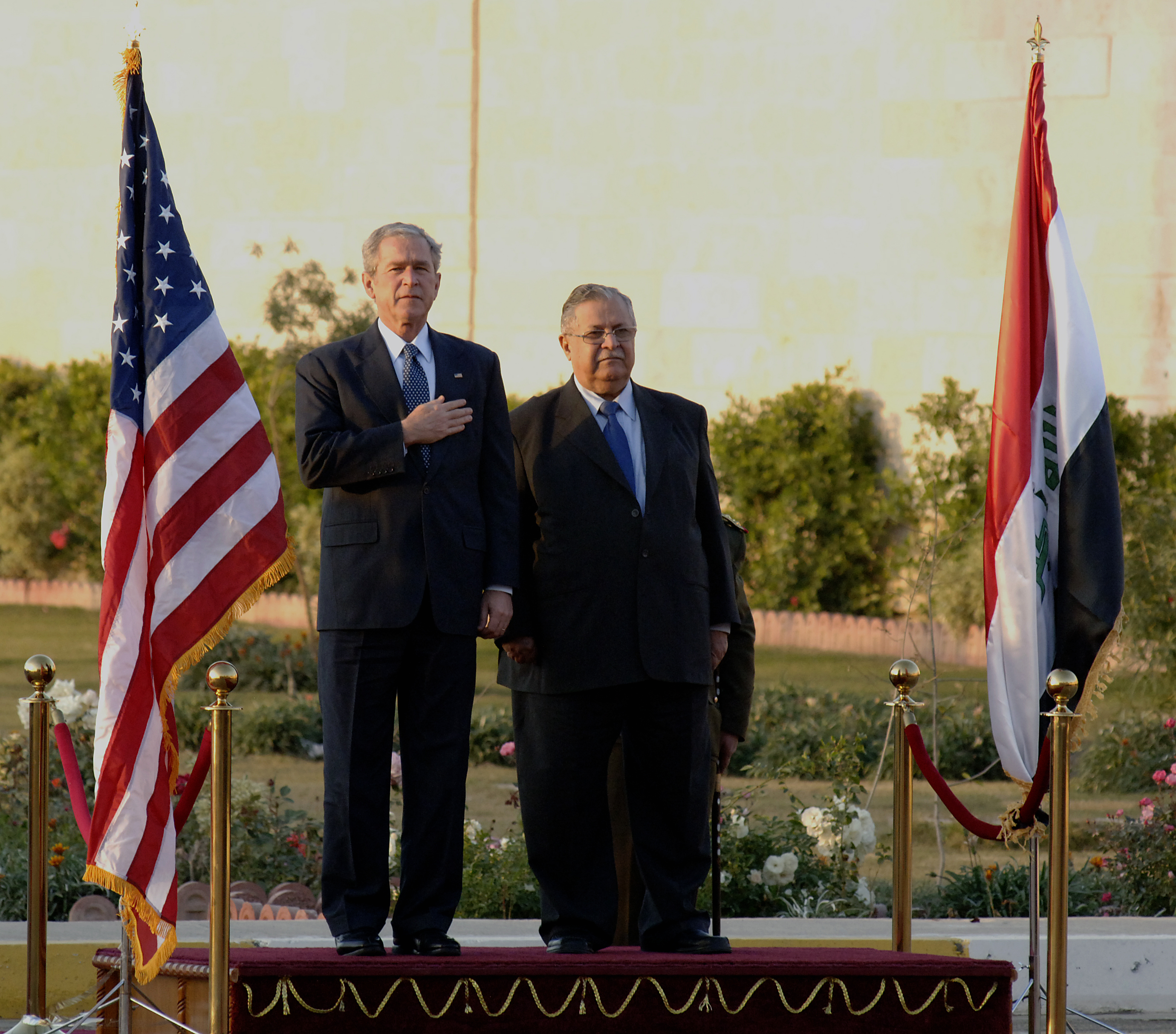

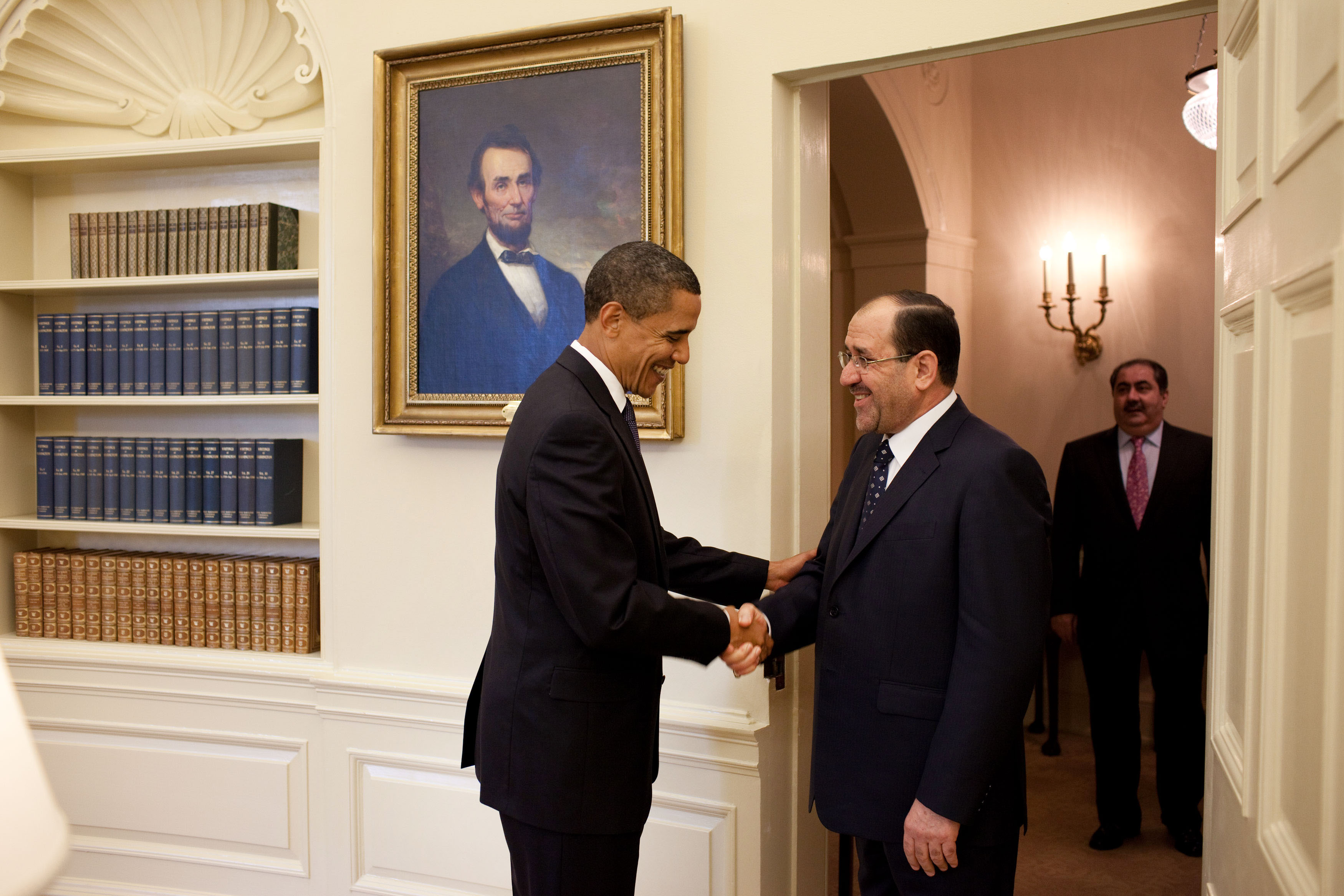

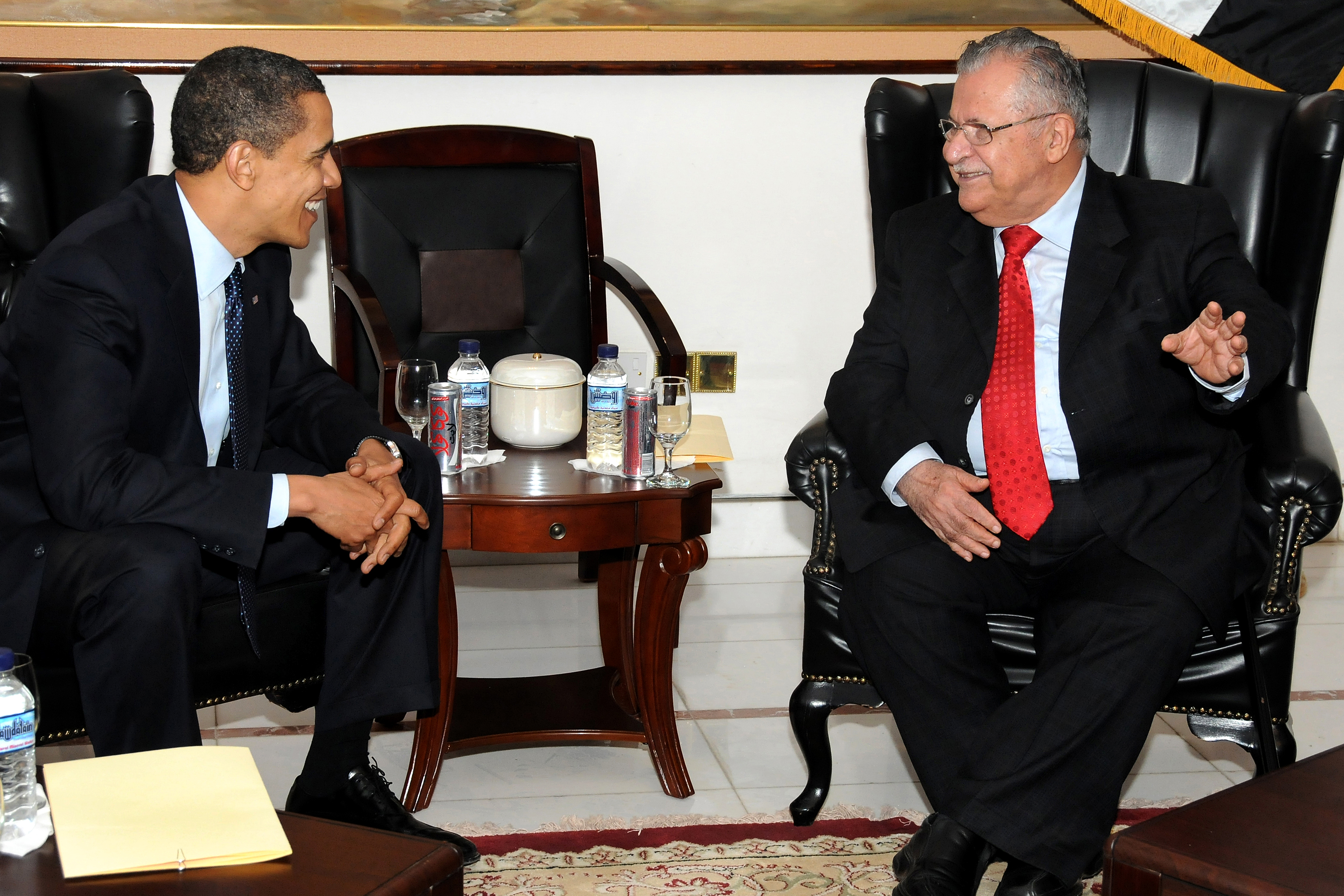

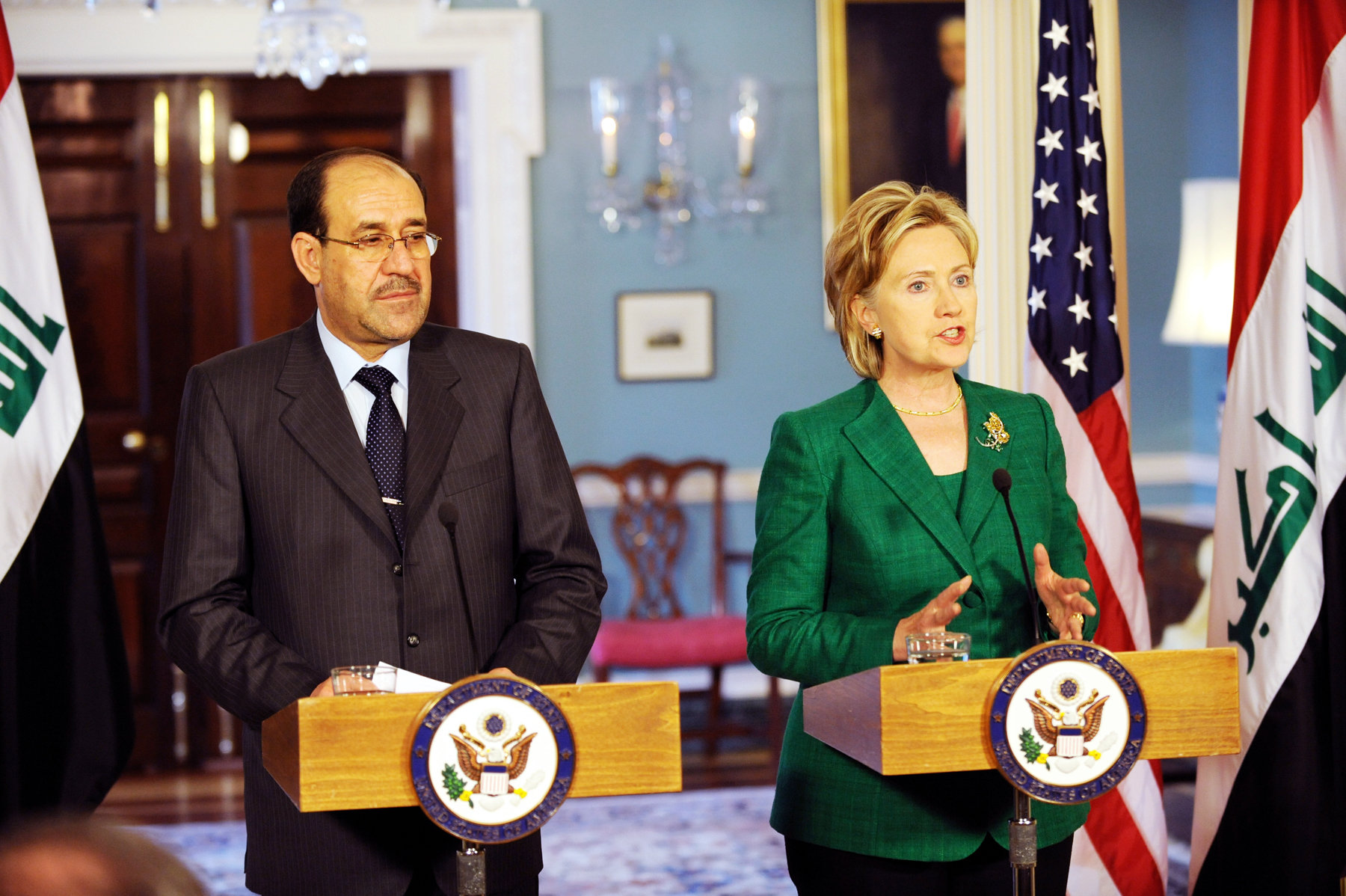

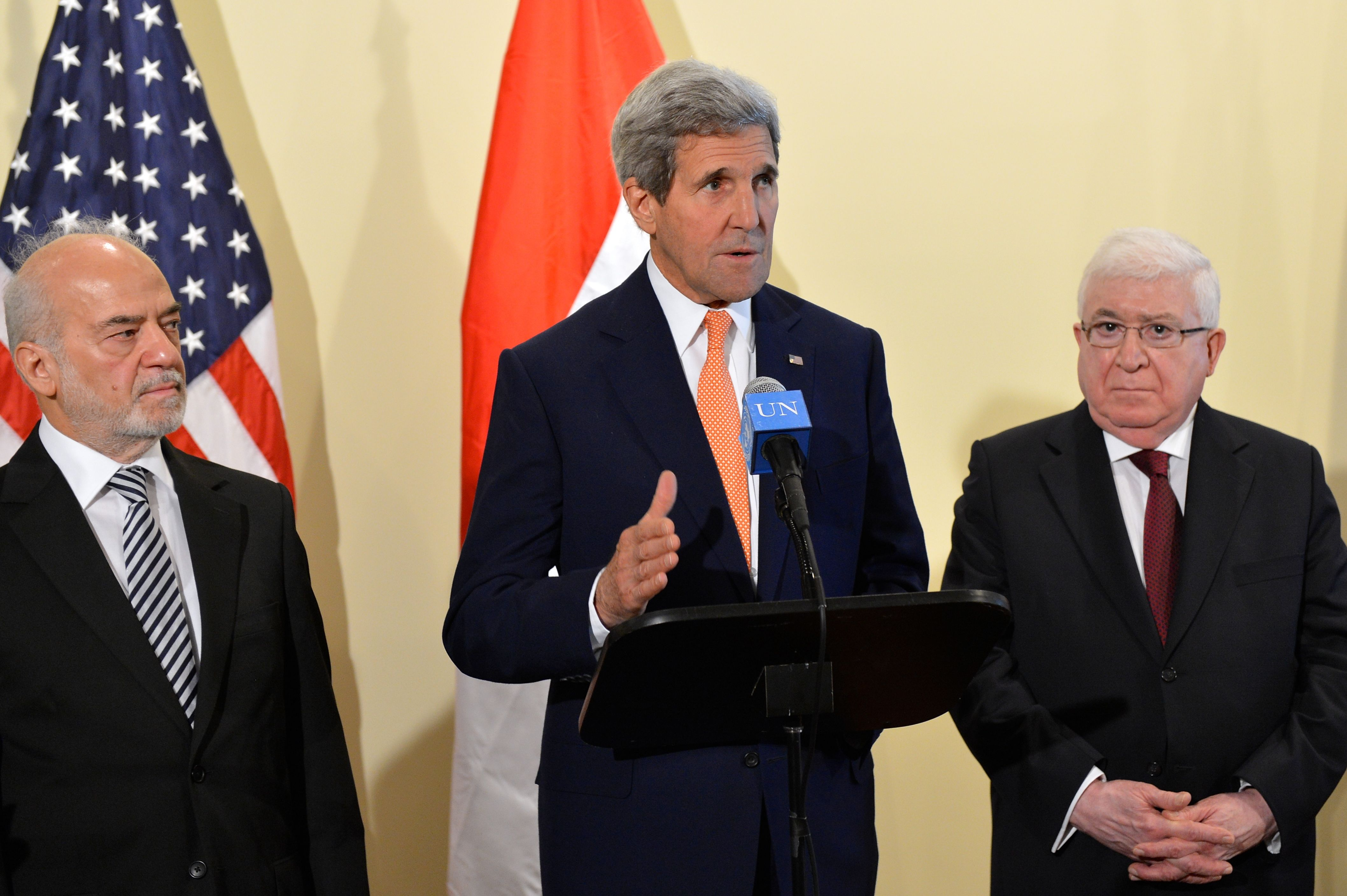

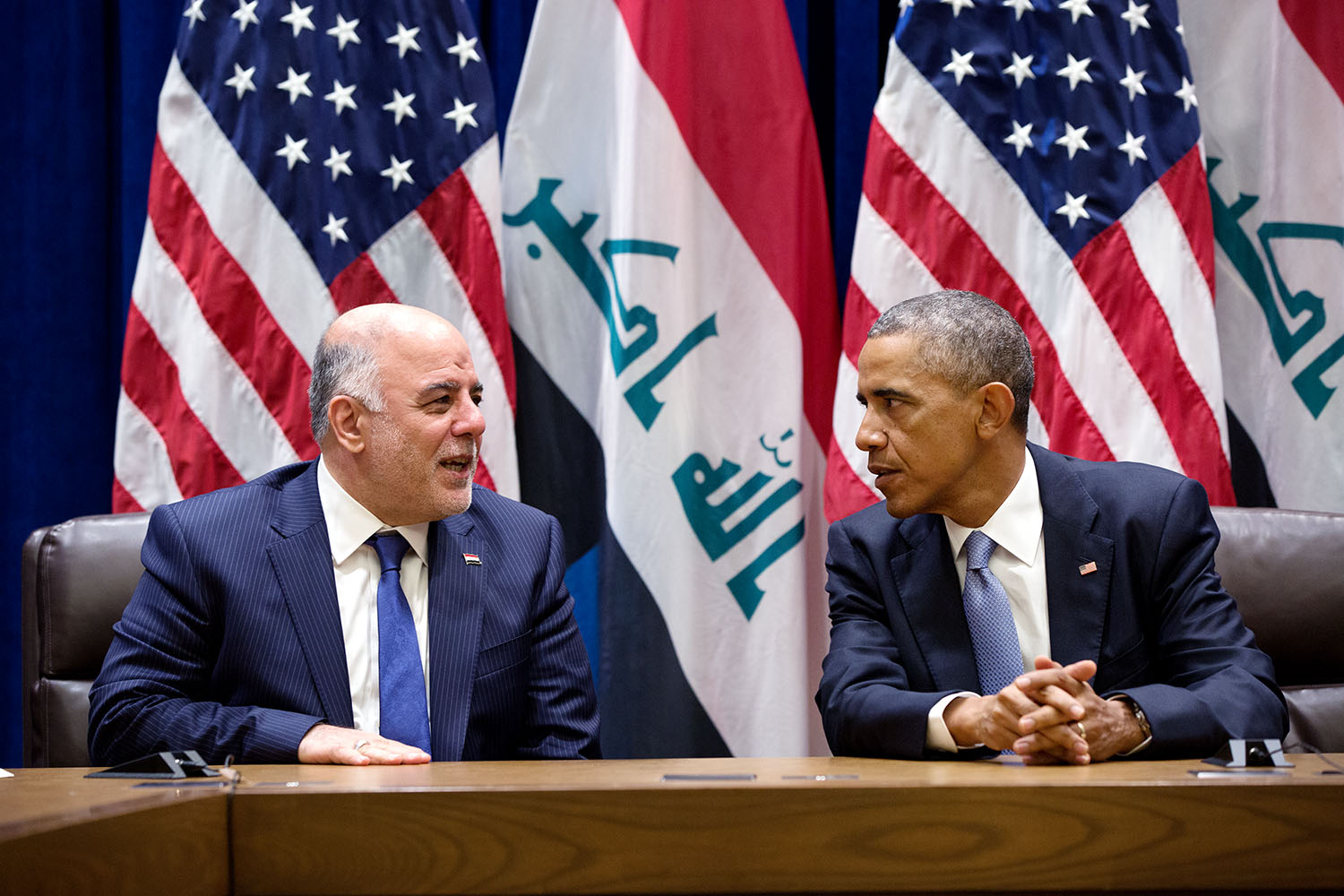

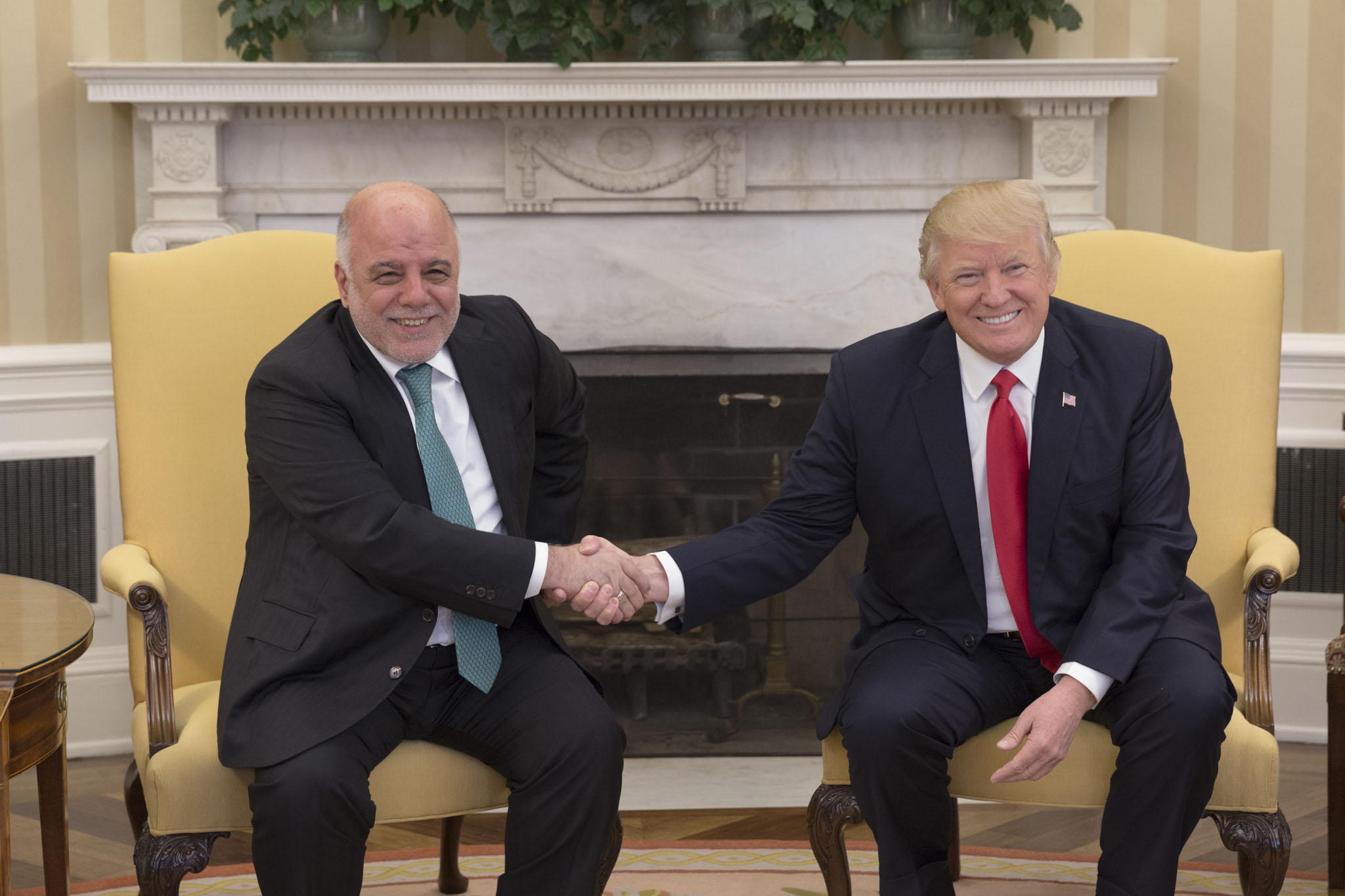

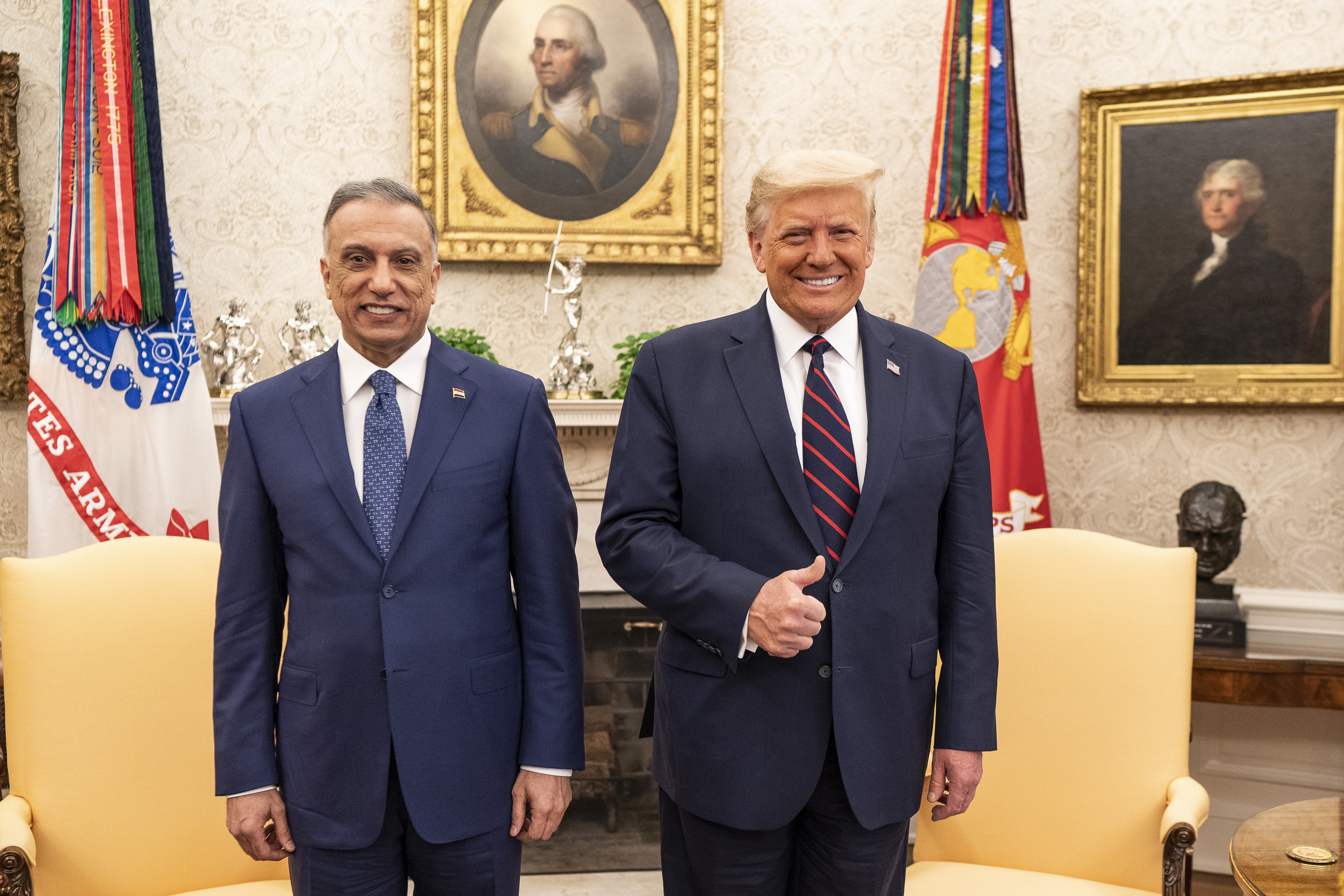

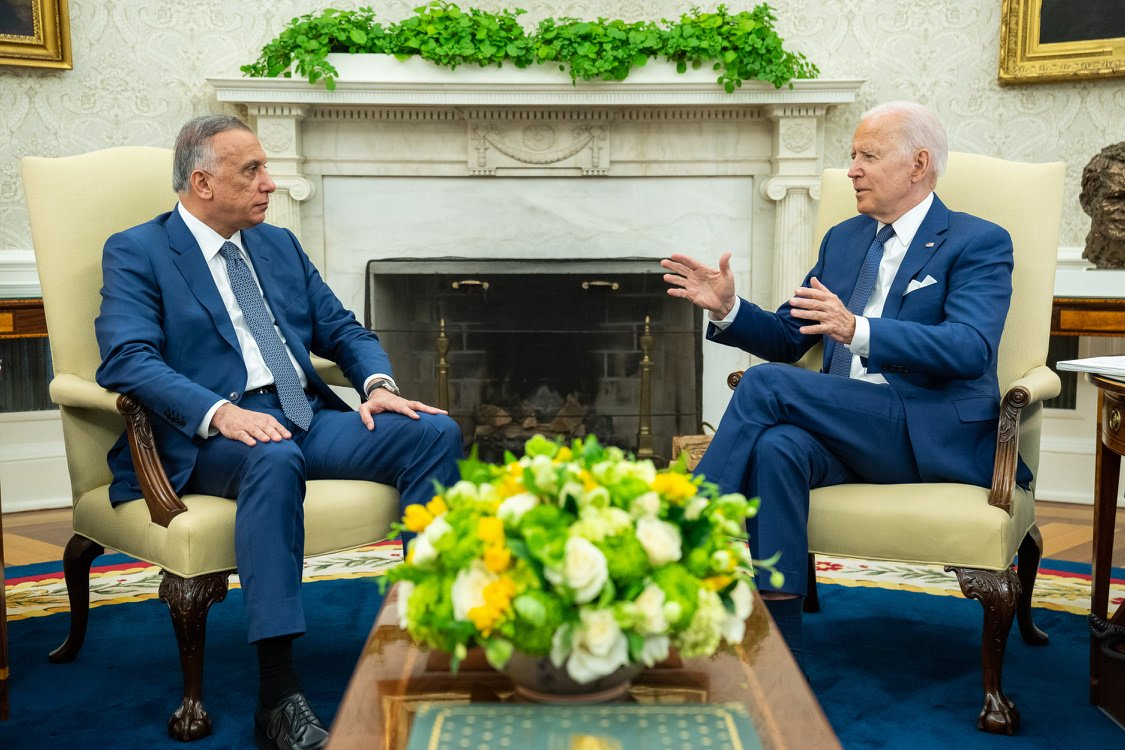

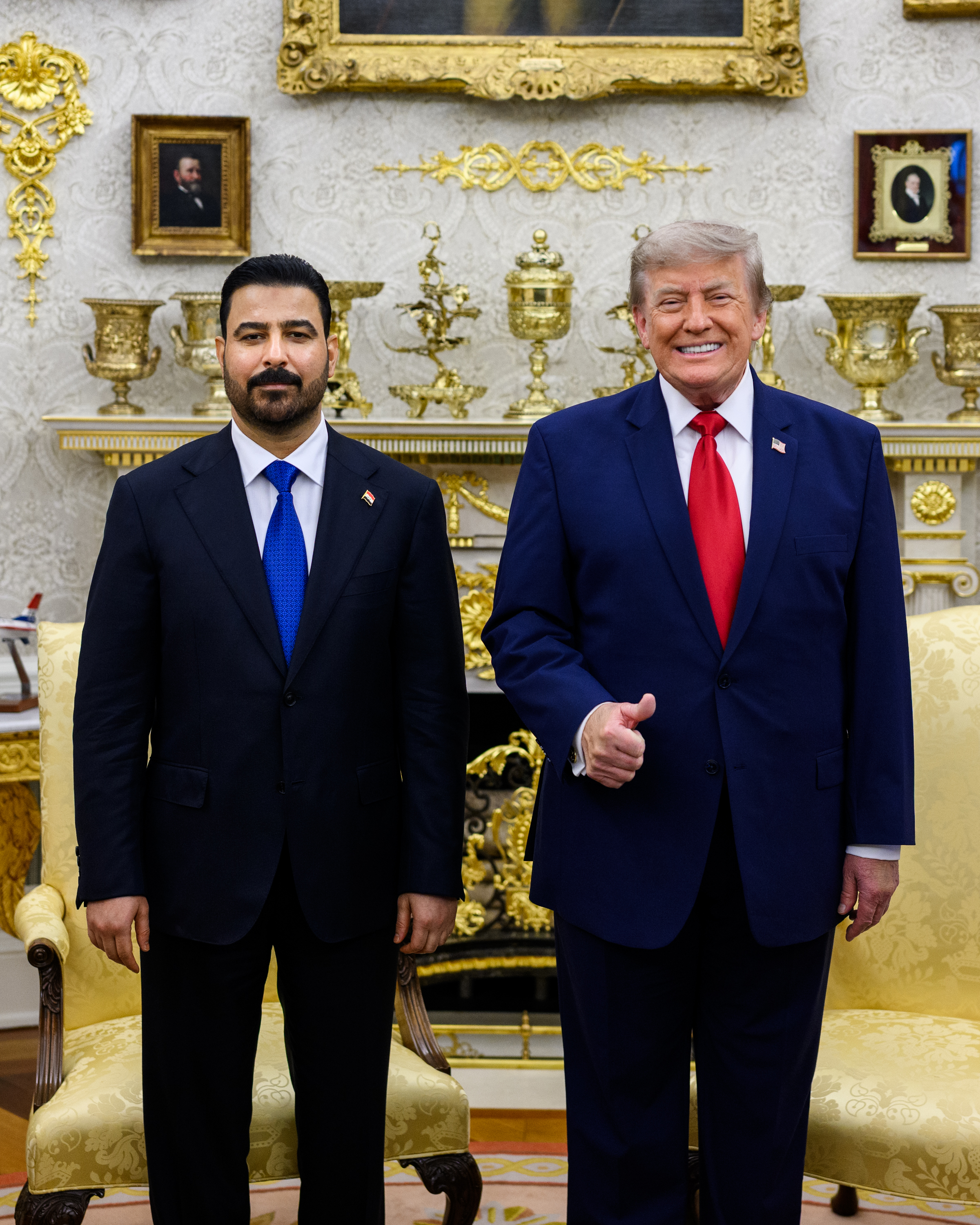

== Israel ==
Table of Trips
Start	End	Guest	Title	Reason
May 24, 1948	May 25, 1948	Chaim Weizmann	President	Met with President Truman. (Was in New York City when elected.) Left U.S. May 26.
April 24, 1949	April 26, 1949	Chaim Weizmann	President	Met with President Truman April 25. In the U.S. April 13 – May 5; visited New York City
May 3, 1951	May 8, 1951	David Ben-Gurion	Prime Minister	Goodwill visit and promotion of Israel Bonds. Also visited Knoxville, New York City, West Point, Philadelphia, Princeton, Baltimore, Boston, Pittsburgh, Chicago, Detroit, Cleveland, Los Angeles. Departed U.S. May 31.
March 9, 1960	March 13, 1960	David Ben-Gurion	Prime Minister	Unofficial visit. In U.S. March 8–16; visited Boston and New York City
May 30, 1961	May 30, 1961	David Ben-Gurion	Prime Minister	Unofficial visit. In U.S. May 28 – June 1. Met with President Kennedy in New York City; also visited Philadelphia
November 24, 1963	November 25, 1963	Zalman Shazar	President	Attended Funeral of President Kennedy.
June 1, 1964	June 3, 1964	Levi Eshkol	Prime Minister	Official visit. In U.S. May 31 – June 11, visited Philadelphia, New York City, Cape Kennedy, Houston and El Paso, Los Angeles, and Chicago.
August 2, 1966	August 3, 1966	Zalman Shazar	President	In U.S.July 28 – August 4; visited New York City. Informal meeting with President Johnson
January 7, 1968	January 9, 1968	Levi Eshkol	Prime Minister	Informal visit at LBJ Ranch. In U.S. January 4–12; visited New York City
March 30, 1969	April 1, 1969	Zalman Shazar	President	Attended funeral of President Eisenhower.
September 25, 1969	September 26, 1969	Golda Meir	Prime Minister	Official visit. In U.S. September 24 – October 5. Private visit to Washington, D.C. September 27–28; then visited New York City, Los Angeles, and Milwaukee.
September 18, 1970	September 18, 1970	Golda Meir	Prime Minister	Private visit. In U.S. September 16–20; visited New York City
October 24, 1970	October 24, 1970	Golda Meir	Prime Minister	Attended White House dinner on 25th Anniversary of the UN
December 2, 1971	December 6, 1971	Golda Meir	Prime Minister	Private visit. Also visited New York City. Departed U.S. December 12.
January 5, 1973	January 5, 1973	Zalman Shazar	President	Attended memorial services for former President Truman.
March 1, 1973	March 1, 1973	Golda Meir	Prime Minister	Private visit. In U.S. February 26 – March 8.
November 1, 1973	November 1, 1973	Golda Meir	Prime Minister	Private working visit and discussion of the Middle East Crisis.
September 10, 1974	September 13, 1974	Yitzhak Rabin	Prime Minister	Official visit. Afterwards visited New York City.
March 3, 1975	March 3, 1975	Ephraim Katzir	President	Private visit.
June 10, 1975	June 13, 1975	Yitzhak Rabin	Prime Minister	Official visit. Afterwards visited New York City.
January 27, 1976	January 30, 1976	Yitzhak Rabin	Prime Minister	Official visit. In U.S. January 26 – February 5; visited Philadelphia, New York City, Detroit, Chicago, and Los Angeles. Addressed the Joint session of the United States Congress January 28.
March 6, 1977	March 9, 1977	Yitzhak Rabin	Prime Minister	Official working visit. Afterwards visited Miami.
July 18, 1977	July 21, 1977	Menachem Begin	Prime Minister	Official working visit.
December 16, 1977	December 17, 1977	Menachem Begin	Prime Minister	Private visit. In U.S. December 14–19; visited New York City.
March 21, 1978	March 21, 1978	Menachem Begin	Prime Minister	Official visit.
April 30, 1978	May 7, 1978	Menachem Begin	Prime Minister	Private visit. Met with President Carter on May 1
September 3, 1978	September 19, 1978	Menachem Begin	Prime Minister	Official visit (Camp David summit talks).
November 2, 1978	November 2, 1978	Menachem Begin	Prime Minister	Informal meeting in New York City.
March 1, 1979	March 4, 1979	Menachem Begin	Prime Minister	Official visit. Departed U.S. March 8.
March 23, 1979	March 29, 1979	Menachem Begin	Prime Minister	Official visit. Signed Egypt–Israel peace treaty March 26.
April 14, 1980	April 17, 1980	Menachem Begin	Prime Minister	Official visit.
November 9, 1980	November 18, 1980	Menachem Begin	Prime Minister	Private visit. Met with President Carter November 13.
September 8, 1981	September 11, 1981	Menachem Begin	Prime Minister	Official visit; visited New York City. Departed U.S. September 15.
June 20, 1982	June 22, 1982	Menachem Begin	Prime Minister	Official working visit. Addressed UN Special Session on Disarmament June 18.
November 11, 1982	November 14, 1982	Menachem Begin	Prime Minister	Private visit to New York City and Los Angeles. Meeting scheduled November 19 with President Reagan cancelled.
January 4, 1983	January 7, 1983	Yitzhak Navon	President	Official working visit; visited Baltimore. Private visit afterward to Boston.
November 16, 1983	November 23, 1983	Chaim Herzog	President	Private visit. Addressed UN General Assembly. Met with President Reagan November 22.
November 27, 1983	November 30, 1983	Yitzhak Shamir	Prime Minister	Official working visit. Private visit to New York City afterward.
October 8, 1984	October 10, 1984	Shimon Peres	Prime Minister	Official working visit.
October 16, 1985	October 18, 1985	Shimon Peres	Prime Minister	Private Visit. Met with President Reagan October 17.
March 31, 1986	April 3, 1986	Shimon Peres	Prime Minister	Private Visit. Met with Vice President Bush April 1.
September 14, 1986	September 16, 1986	Shimon Peres	Prime Minister	Official Working Visit.
February 17, 1987	February 20, 1987	Yitzhak Shamir	Prime Minister	Official Working Visit. In New York City February 16; Private visit to Los Angeles afterward.
November 9, 1987	November 12, 1987	Chaim Herzog	President	State visit. Addressed Joint session of the United States Congress November 10. Afterwards visited New York City and Waltham. Departed U.S. November 15.
November 20, 1987	November 20, 1987	Yitzhak Shamir	Prime Minister	Met with President Reagan during a private visit.
March 14, 1988	March 17, 1988	Yitzhak Shamir	Prime Minister	Official Working Visit. Private visit to Los Angeles afterwards.
April 5, 1989	April 7, 1989	Yitzhak Shamir	Prime Minister	Official Visit.
November 14, 1989	November 15, 1989	Yitzhak Shamir	Prime Minister	Met with President Bush during a private visit. Visited New York City until November 21.
November 21, 1991	November 22, 1991	Yitzhak Shamir	Prime Minister	Met with President Bush during a private visit. Arrived in the U.S. Nov.15; departed Nov.24. Also visited Baltimore, Los Angeles, Boston, and New York City.
August 10, 1992	August 11, 1992	Yitzhak Rabin	Prime Minister	Informal meeting with President Bush at Kennebunkport, ME. Afterwards visited Washington, D.C. (Aug.12–13) and New York City.
November 16, 1992	November 16, 1992	Chaim Herzog	President	Met with President Bush during a private visit.
March 15, 1993	March 17, 1993	Yitzhak Rabin	Prime Minister	Private Visit. Afterwards visited New York City. Departed the U.S. March 18.
April 21, 1993	April 22, 1993	Chaim Herzog	President	Attended dedication of the Holocaust Memorial Museum and met with President Bill Clinton on April 21.
September 13, 1993	September 13, 1993	Yitzhak Rabin	Prime Minister	Signed Israeli-Palestinian Declaration of Principles.
November 11, 1993	November 16, 1993	Yitzhak Rabin	Prime Minister	Met with President Clinton during a private visit. Also visited New York City.
March 15, 1994	March 16, 1994	Yitzhak Rabin	Prime Minister	Official working visit.
July 24, 1994	July 26, 1994	Yitzhak Rabin	Prime Minister	Signed the Israel–Jordan peace treaty and addressed a Joint session of the United States Congress
November 20, 1994	November 21, 1994	Yitzhak Rabin	Prime Minister	Met with President Clinton during a private visit. Arrived in the U.S. Nov.16; also visited Los Angeles, Denver, New York City
May 5, 1995	May 8, 1995	Yitzhak Rabin	Prime Minister	Met with President Clinton during a private visit.
September 28, 1995	September 30, 1995	Yitzhak Rabin	Prime Minister	Attended signing of Israeli-Palestinian Interim Agreement. Afterwards visited New York City.
October 25, 1995	October 25, 1995	Yitzhak Rabin	Prime Minister	Met with President Clinton during a private visit.
December 10, 1995	December 12, 1995	Shimon Peres	Prime Minister	Official working visit. Arrived in the U.S. December 10; Attended memorial service for Prime MinisterYitzhak Rabin in New York City. Addressed Joint Session of Congress.
April 28, 1996	April 30, 1996	Shimon Peres	Prime Minister	Signed missile defense cooperation and anti-terrorism agreements. Met with PLO ChairmanYasser Arafat
November 9, 1996	November 11, 1996	Benjamin Netanyahu	Prime Minister	Official working visit. Addressed Joint session of Congress. Later visited New York City. Departed the U.S. July 13.
September 6, 1996	September 6, 1996	Benjamin Netanyahu	Prime Minister	Private visit. Afterwards visited New York City.
September 30, 1996	October 2, 1996	Benjamin Netanyahu	Prime Minister	Attended Middle East Summit Meeting.
February 12, 1997	February 14, 1997	Benjamin Netanyahu	Prime Minister	Official working visit.
April 7, 1997	April 8, 1997	Benjamin Netanyahu	Prime Minister	Met with President Clinton during a private visit.
October 5, 1997	October 9, 1997	Ezer Weizman	President	Official working visit.
January 19, 1998	January 21, 1998	Benjamin Netanyahu	Prime Minister	Working visit. Discussed the Israeli–Palestinian peace process with President Clinton.
September 28, 1998	September 29, 1998	Benjamin Netanyahu	Prime Minister	Working visit. Discussed the Israeli–Palestinian peace process with President Clinton and Palestinian Authority President Yasser Arafat.
October 15, 1998	October 23, 1998	Benjamin Netanyahu	Prime Minister	Discussed the Israeli–Palestinian peace process with President Clinton and Palestinian Authority President Yasir Arafat in Washington, D.C. and at Wye Plantation. Signed Wye River Memorandum at the White House on October 23.Private visit.
July 14, 1999	July 20, 1999	Ehud Barak	Prime Minister	Official working visit. Discussed the Israeli–Palestinian peace process with President Clinton in Washington, D.C. and Camp David. Also visited New York City.
December 14, 1999	December 17, 1999	Ehud Barak	Prime Minister	Private visit. Peace negotiations with Syrian Foreign MinisterFarouk al-Sharaa.
January 3, 2000	January 10, 2000	Ehud Barak	Prime Minister	Private visit and peace negotiations with Syrian Foreign MinisterFarouk al-Sharaa at Shepherdstown
April 11, 2000	April 11, 2000	Ehud Barak	Prime Minister	Working visit during Israeli–Palestinian peace process.
July 12, 2000	July 25, 2000	Ehud Barak	Prime Minister	Private visit. Middle East peace conference at Camp David with Palestinian Authority Chairman Yasir Arafat. Also visited Gettysburg
September 6, 2000	September 9, 2000	Ehud Barak	Prime Minister	Met with President Clinton at the UN Millennium Summit in New York City.
November 12, 2000	November 12, 2000	Ehud Barak	Prime Minister	Working visit. Discussed the Middle East peace process with President Clinton.
March 19, 2001	March 20, 2001	Ariel Sharon	Prime Minister	Working visit. Afterwards visited New York City. Departed the U.S. March 22.
May 29, 2001	June 1, 2001	Moshe Katsav	President	Working visit.
June 26, 2001	June 27, 2001	Ariel Sharon	Prime Minister	Discussed the Israeli–Palestinian conflict with President Bush and Secretary of State Powell during a private visit.
December 3, 2001	December 4, 2001	Ariel Sharon	Prime Minister	Working Visit.
February 6, 2002	February 8, 2002	Ariel Sharon	Prime Minister	Met with President Bush February 7 during a private visit.
May 5, 2002	May 7, 2002	Ariel Sharon	Prime Minister	Working visit.
June 10, 2002	June 11, 2002	Ariel Sharon	Prime Minister	Working visit.
October 15, 2002	October 17, 2002	Ariel Sharon	Prime Minister	Working visit.
July 27, 2003	July 30, 2003	Ariel Sharon	Prime Minister	Working visit.
April 13, 2004	April 15, 2004	Ariel Sharon	Prime Minister	Working visit.
April 11, 2005	April 11, 2005	Ariel Sharon	Prime Minister	Met with President Bush at Crawford Ranch
September 14, 2005	September 14, 2005	Ariel Sharon	Prime Minister	Met with President Bush at the UN General Assembly in New York City.
May 21, 2006	May 24, 2006	Ehud Olmert	Prime Minister	Working visit. Addressed Joint session of Congress May 24.
November 12, 2006	November 14, 2006	Ehud Olmert	Prime Minister	Working visit
June 18, 2007	June 19, 2007	Ehud Olmert	Prime Minister	Working visit
November 25, 2007	November 28, 2007	Ehud Olmert	Prime Minister	Working visit. Met with President Bush before and after attending the Middle East Peace Conference in Annapolis
June 3, 2008	June 5, 2008	Ehud Olmert	Prime Minister	Working visit.
November 22, 2008	November 25, 2008	Ehud Olmert	Prime Minister	Working visit.
May 5, 2009	May 5, 2009	Shimon Peres	President	Working visit.
May 18, 2009	May 18, 2009	Benjamin Netanyahu	Prime Minister	Working visit.
September 22, 2009	September 22, 2009	Benjamin Netanyahu	Prime Minister	Met with President Obama and with Palestinian Authority President Abbas at the UN General Assembly in New York City.
November 9, 2009	November 9, 2009	Benjamin Netanyahu	Prime Minister	Working Visit.
March 22, 2010	March 24, 2010	Benjamin Netanyahu	Prime Minister	Working Visit.
July 6, 2010	July 6, 2010	Benjamin Netanyahu	Prime Minister	Working Visit.
September 1, 2010	September 2, 2010	Benjamin Netanyahu	Prime Minister	Attended Middle East peace talks.
April 4, 2011	April 5, 2011	Shimon Peres	President	Working visit.
May 20, 2011	May 25, 2011	Benjamin Netanyahu	Prime Minister	Working visit. Addressed a Joint session of Congress May 24.
September 21, 2011	September 21, 2011	Benjamin Netanyahu	Prime Minister	Met with President Obama at the UN General Assembly in New York City.
March 4, 2012	March 6, 2012	Benjamin Netanyahu	Prime Minister	Working visit.
June 13, 2012	June 13, 2012	Shimon Peres	President	Working visit. Received the Presidential Medal of Freedom.
September 30, 2013	September 30, 2013	Benjamin Netanyahu	Prime Minister	Official Working Visit.
March 2, 2014	March 3, 2014	Benjamin Netanyahu	Prime Minister	Official Working Visit.
June 25, 2014	June 25, 2014	Shimon Peres	President	Official Working Visit.
October 1, 2014	October 1, 2014	Benjamin Netanyahu	Prime Minister	Official Working Visit.
November 9, 2015	November 9, 2015	Benjamin Netanyahu	Prime Minister	Official Working Visit.
December 8, 2015	December 9, 2015	Reuven Rivlin	President	Official Working Visit.
February 14, 2017	February 15, 2017	Benjamin Netanyahu	Prime Minister	Official Working Visit.
September 28, 2017	September 28, 2017	Benjamin Netanyahu	Prime Minister	Met with President Trump at the UN General Assembly in New York City.
March 4, 2018	March 7, 2018	Benjamin Netanyahu	Prime Minister	Working Visit.
March 24, 2019	March 27, 2019	Benjamin Netanyahu	Prime Minister	Working Visit.
January 27, 2020	January 27, 2020	Benjamin Netanyahu	Prime Minister	Working Visit.
September 15, 2020	September 15, 2020	Benjamin Netanyahu	Prime Minister	Abraham Accords Signing Ceremony.
June 28, 2021	June 28, 2021	Reuven Rivlin	President	Working Visit.
August 26, 2021	August 26, 2021	Naftali Bennett	Prime Minister	Working Visit.
October 26, 2022	October 26, 2022	Isaac Herzog	President	Working Visit.
July 18, 2023	July 20, 2023	Isaac Herzog	President	Working Visit.
September 20, 2023	September 20, 2023	Benjamin Netanyahu	Prime Minister	Met with President Biden at the UN General Assembly in New York City.
July 25, 2024	July 25, 2024	Benjamin Netanyahu	Prime Minister	Working Visit.
November 12, 2024	November 12, 2024	Isaac Herzog	President	Official Visit.
February 4, 2025	February 5, 2025	Benjamin Netanyahu	Prime Minister	Working Visit.
April 7, 2025	April 7, 2025	Benjamin Netanyahu	Prime Minister	Working Visit.
July 7, 2025	July 7, 2025	Benjamin Netanyahu	Prime Minister	Working Visit.
September 29, 2025	September 29, 2025	Benjamin Netanyahu	Prime Minister	Working Visit.
December 29, 2025	January 1, 2026	Benjamin Netanyahu	Prime Minister	Met with President Trump at Mar-a-Lago, Florida.
July 27, 2026	July 29, 2026	Benjamin Netanyahu	Prime Minister	Official Visit. Attended at the funeral of former Senator Lindsey Graham and met with President Trump.

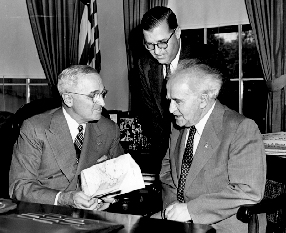

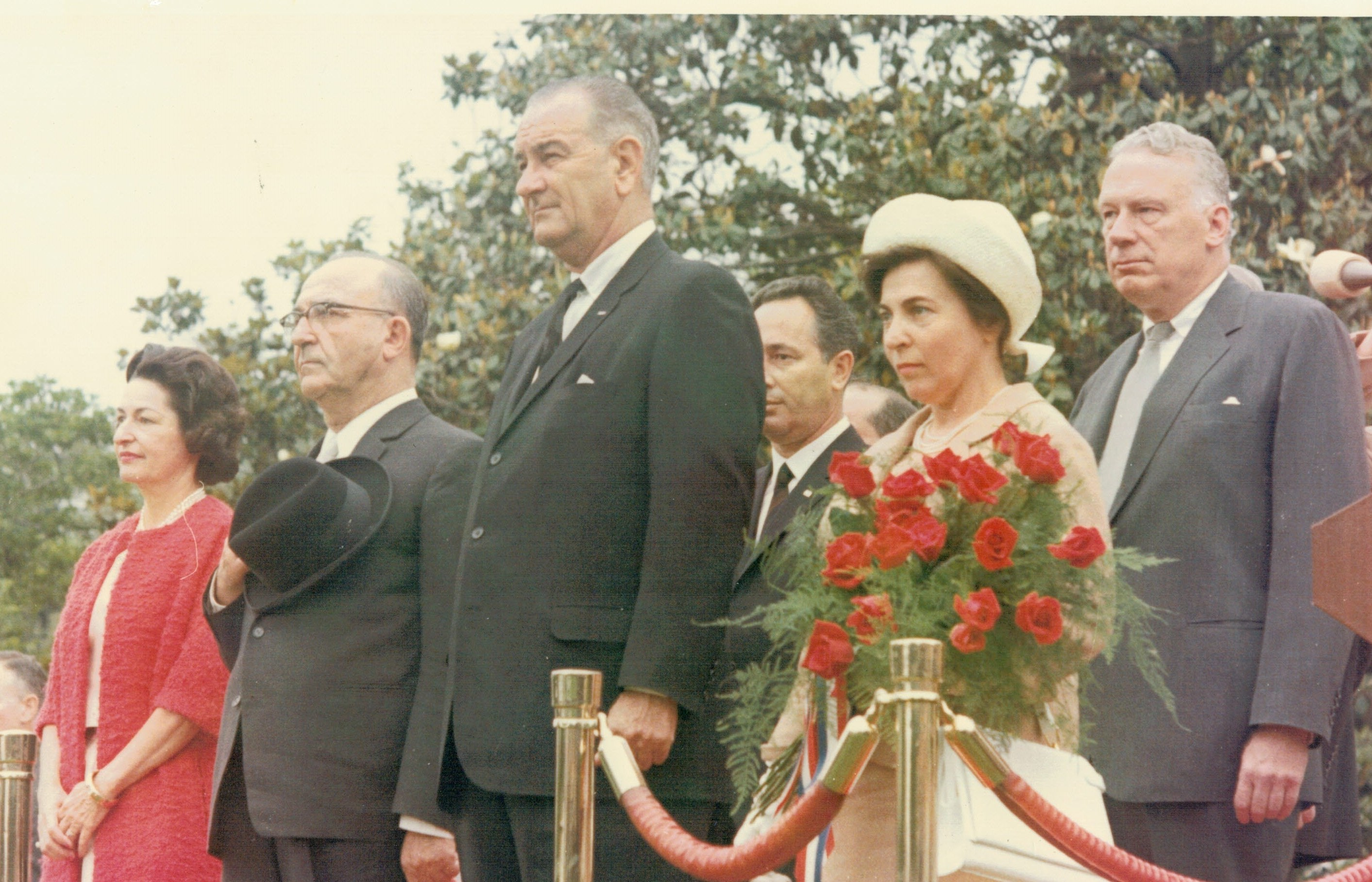

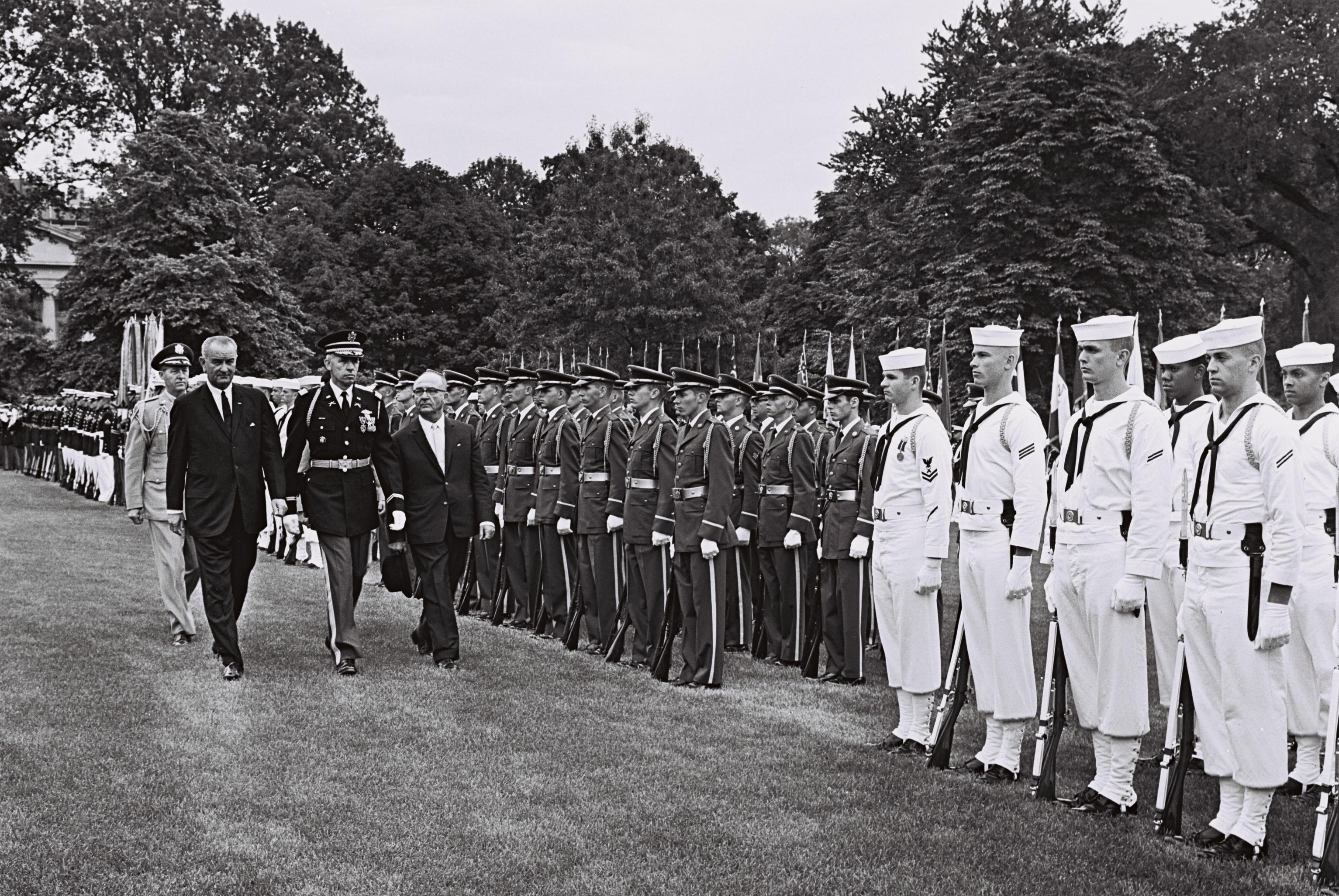

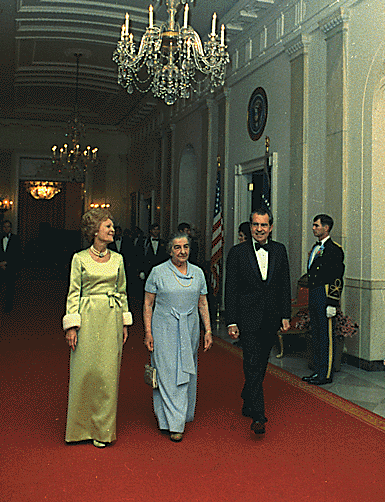

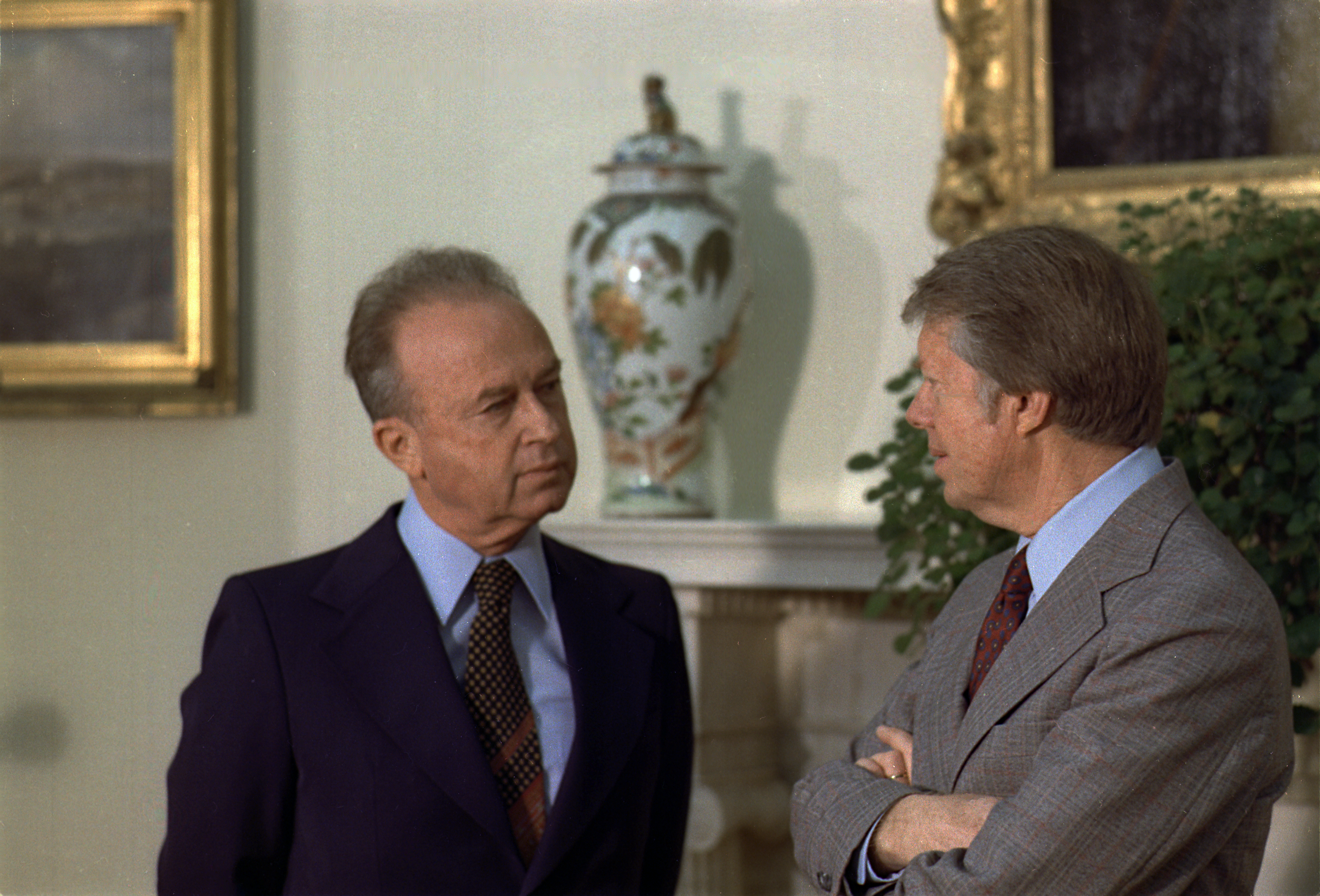

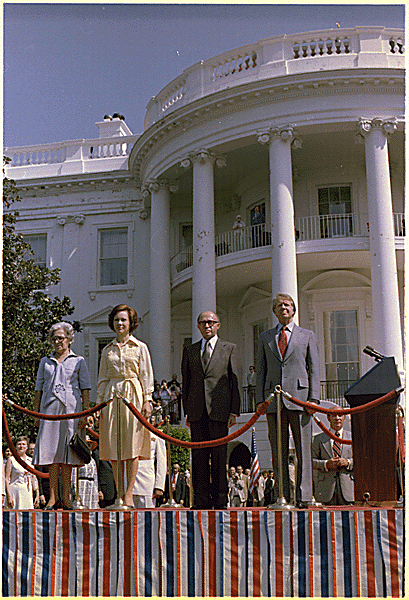

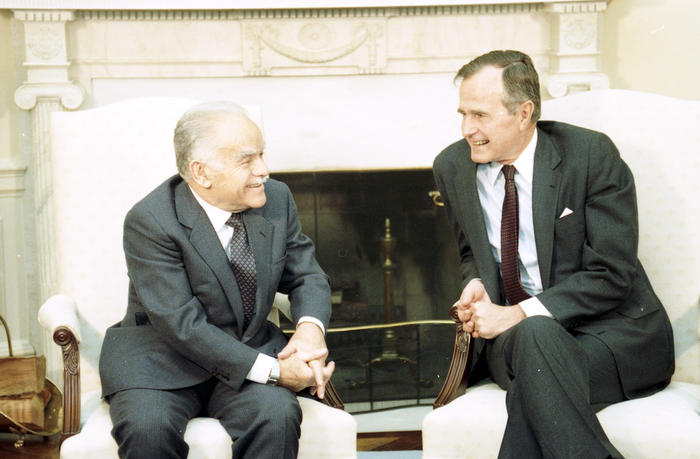

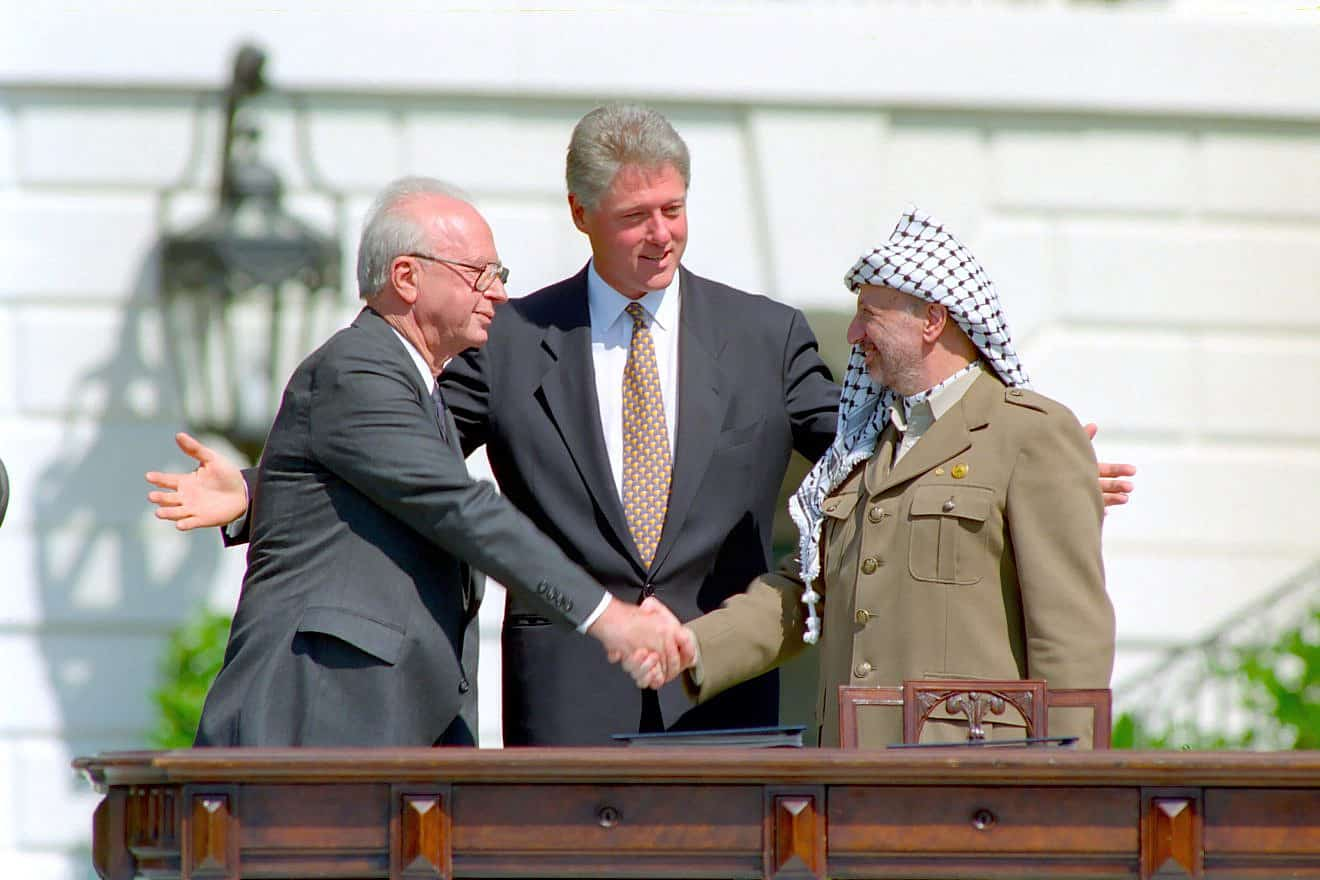

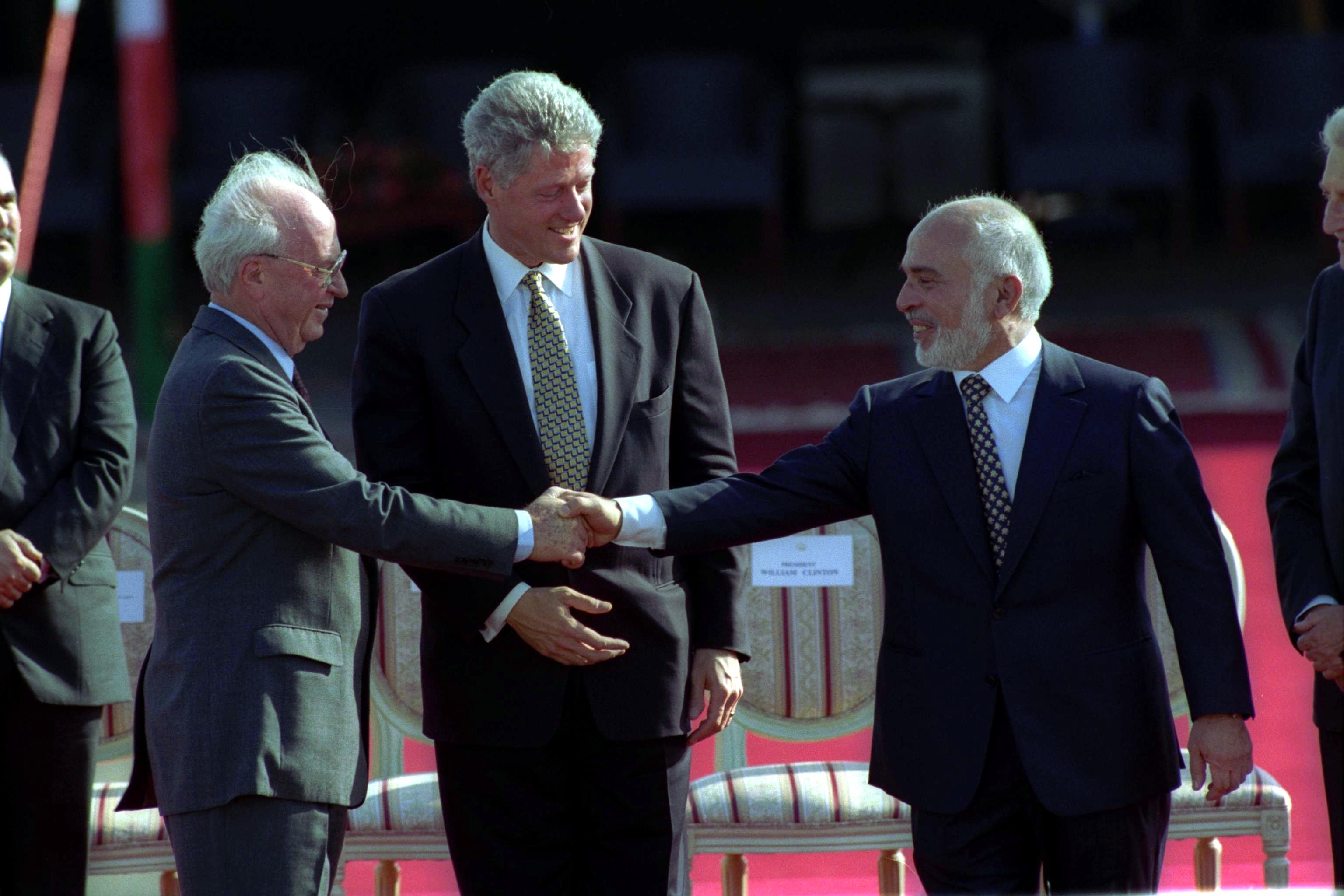

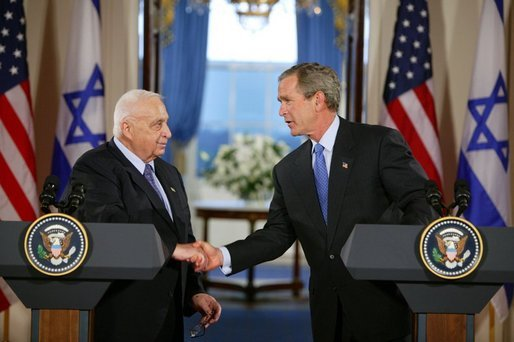

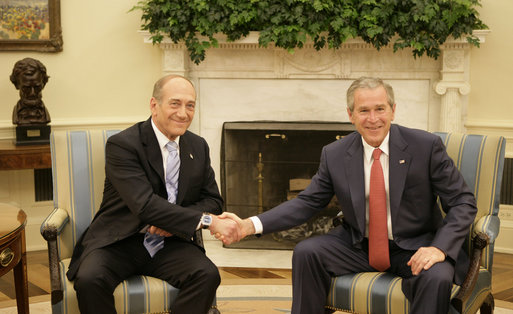

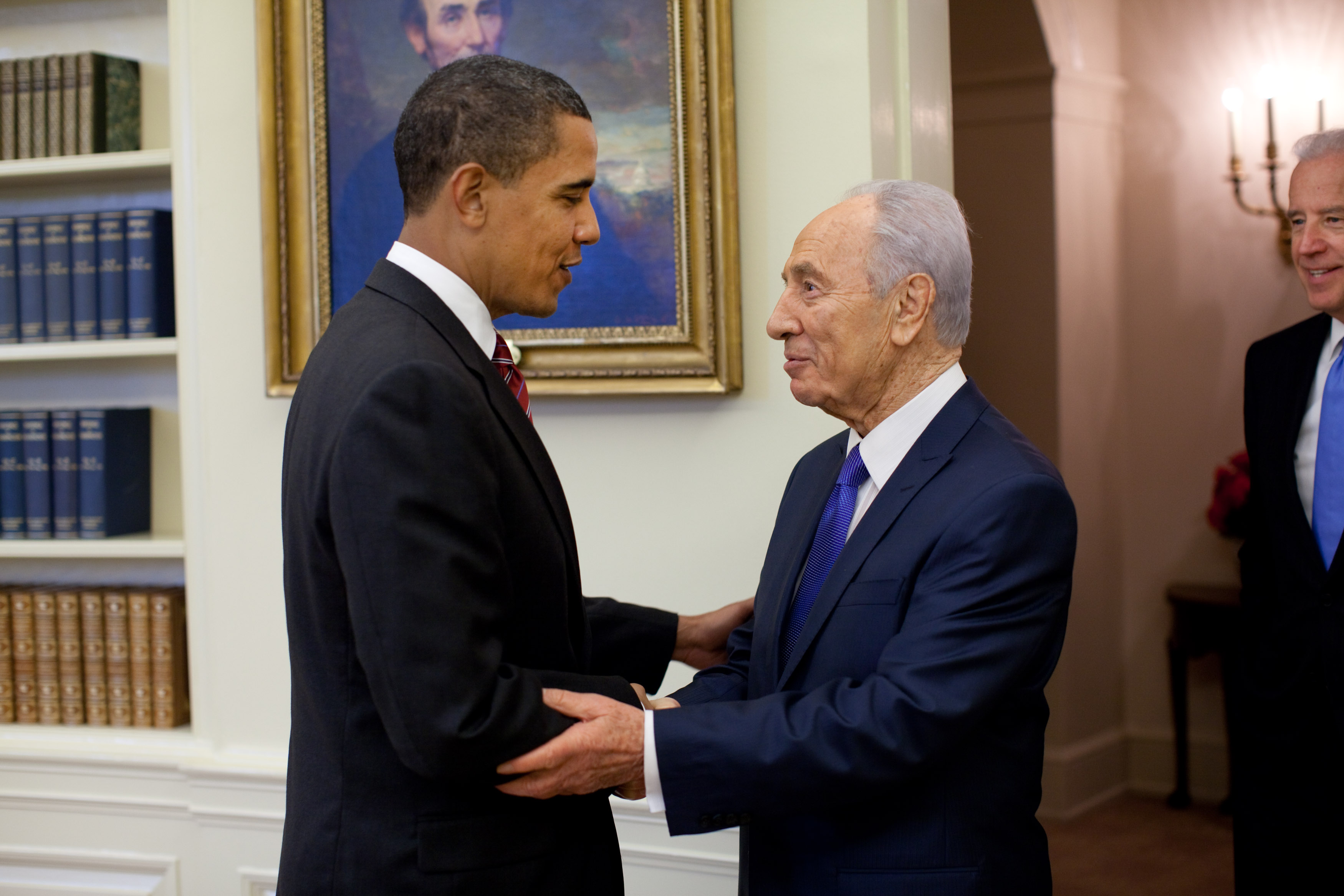

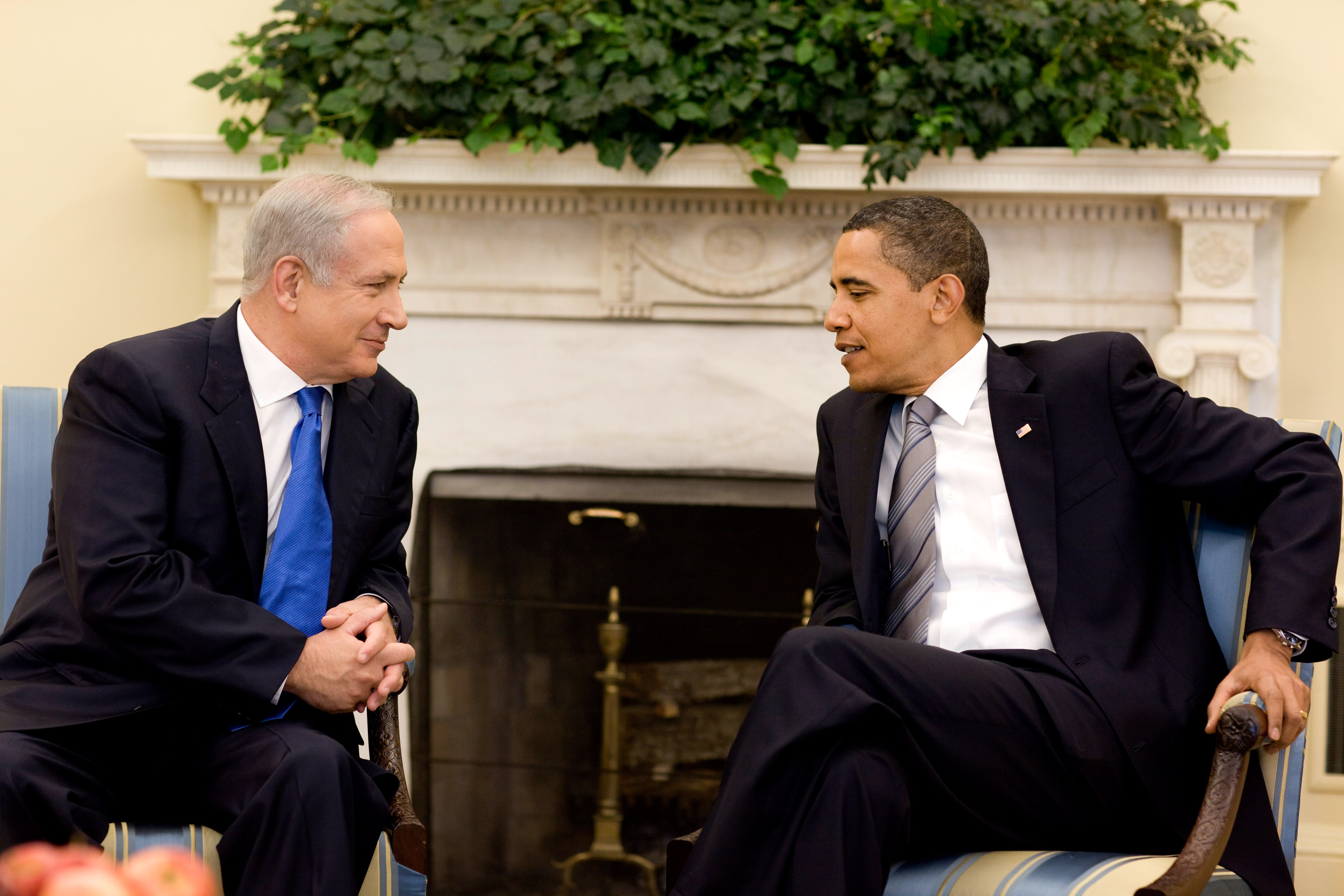

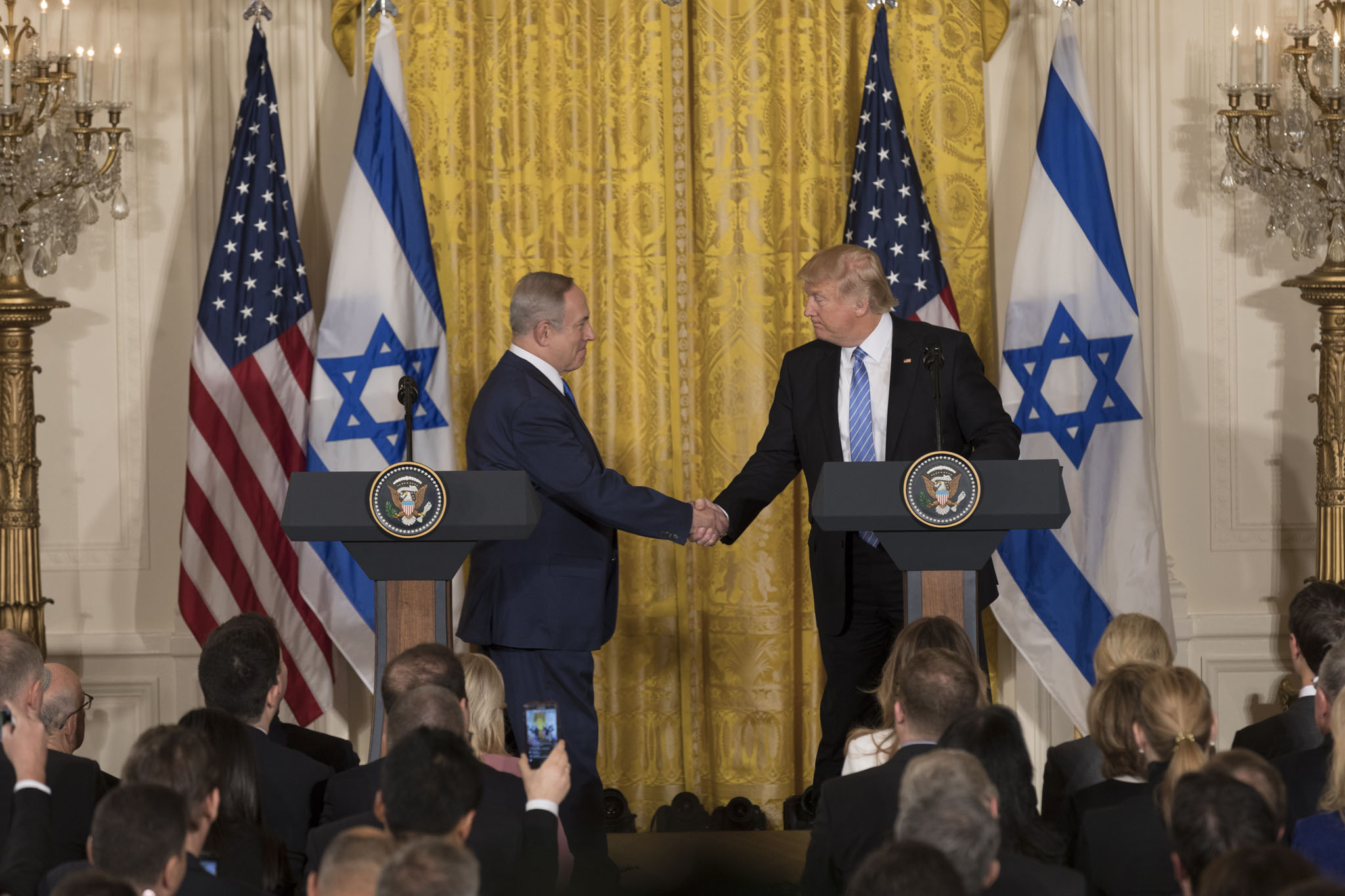

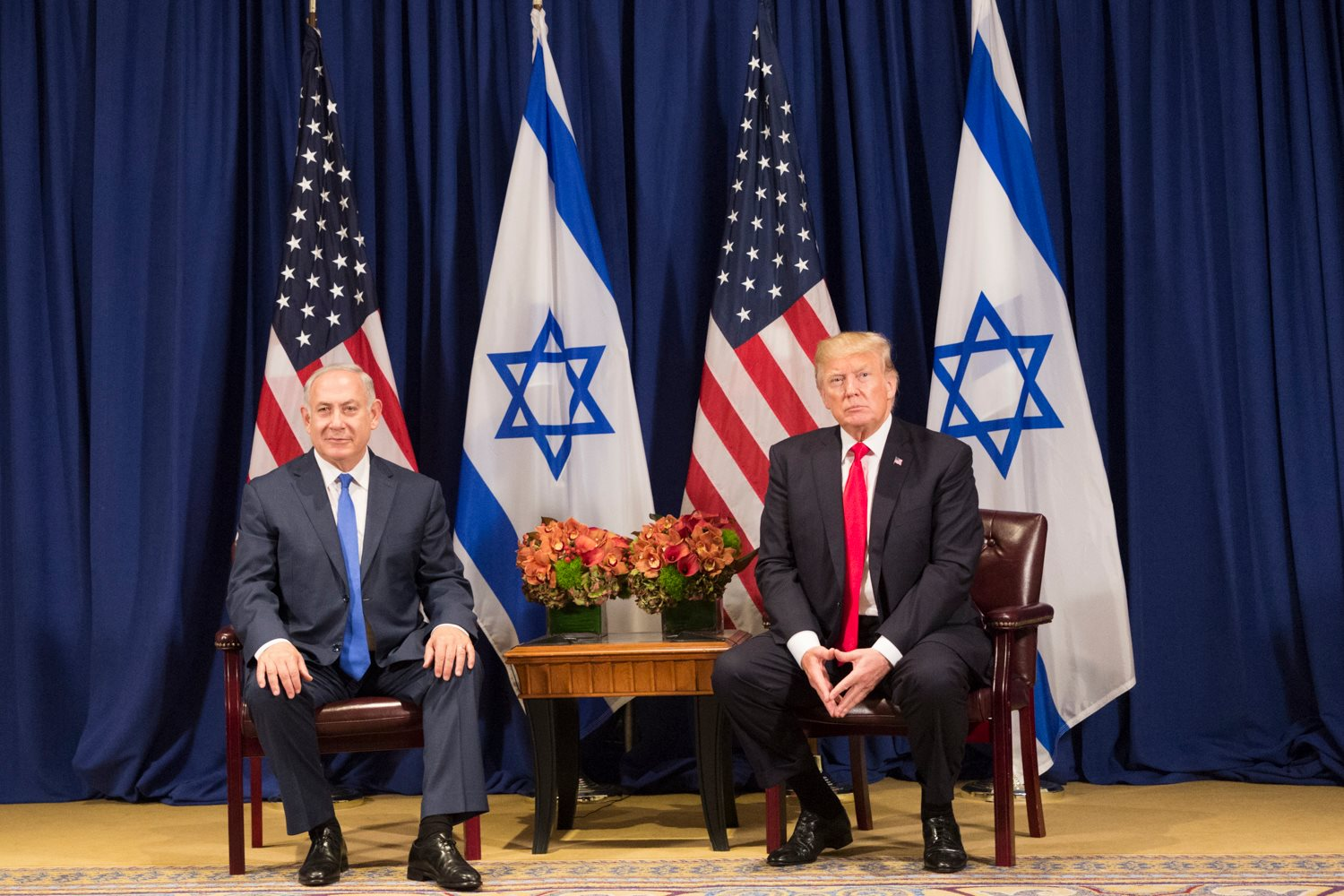

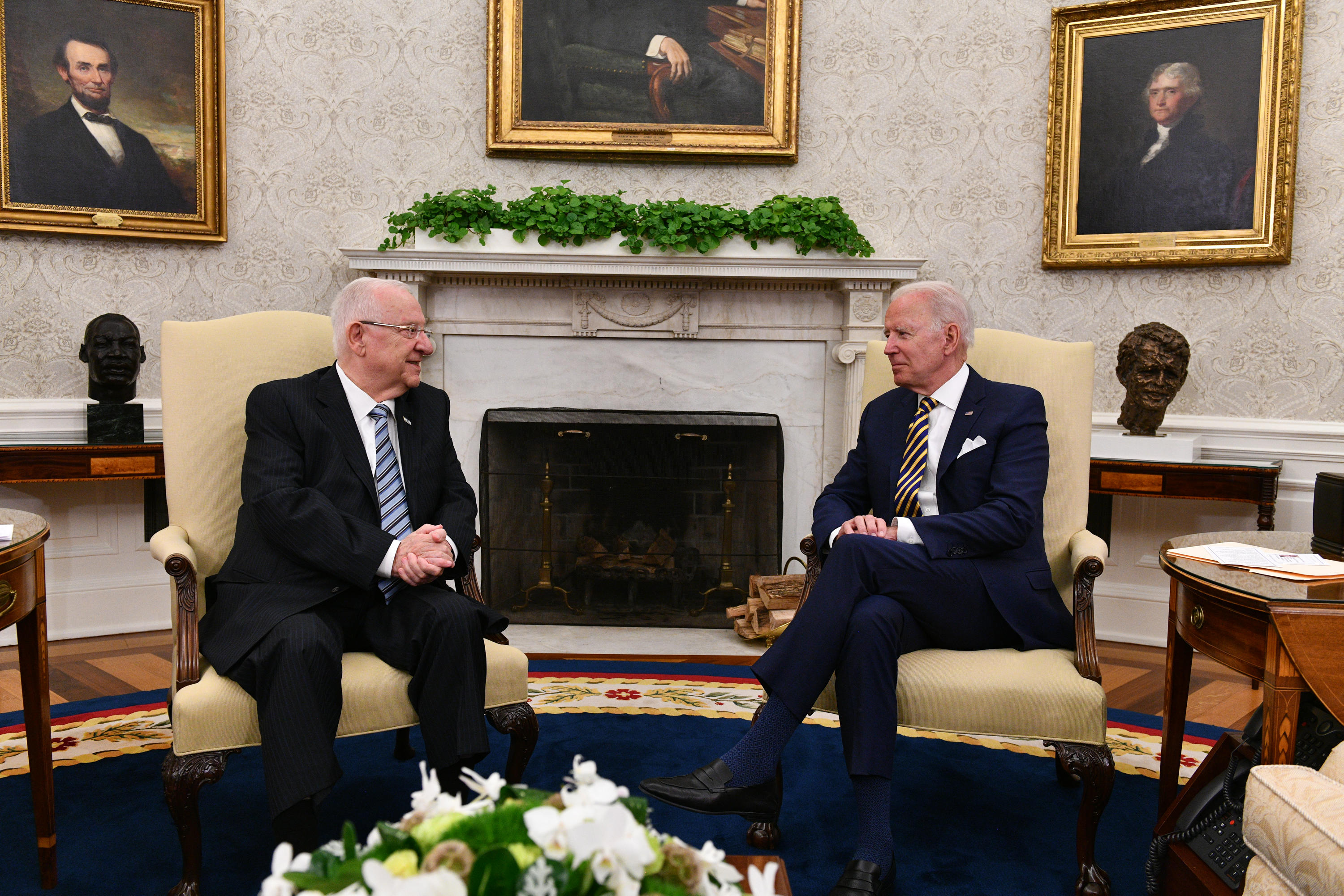

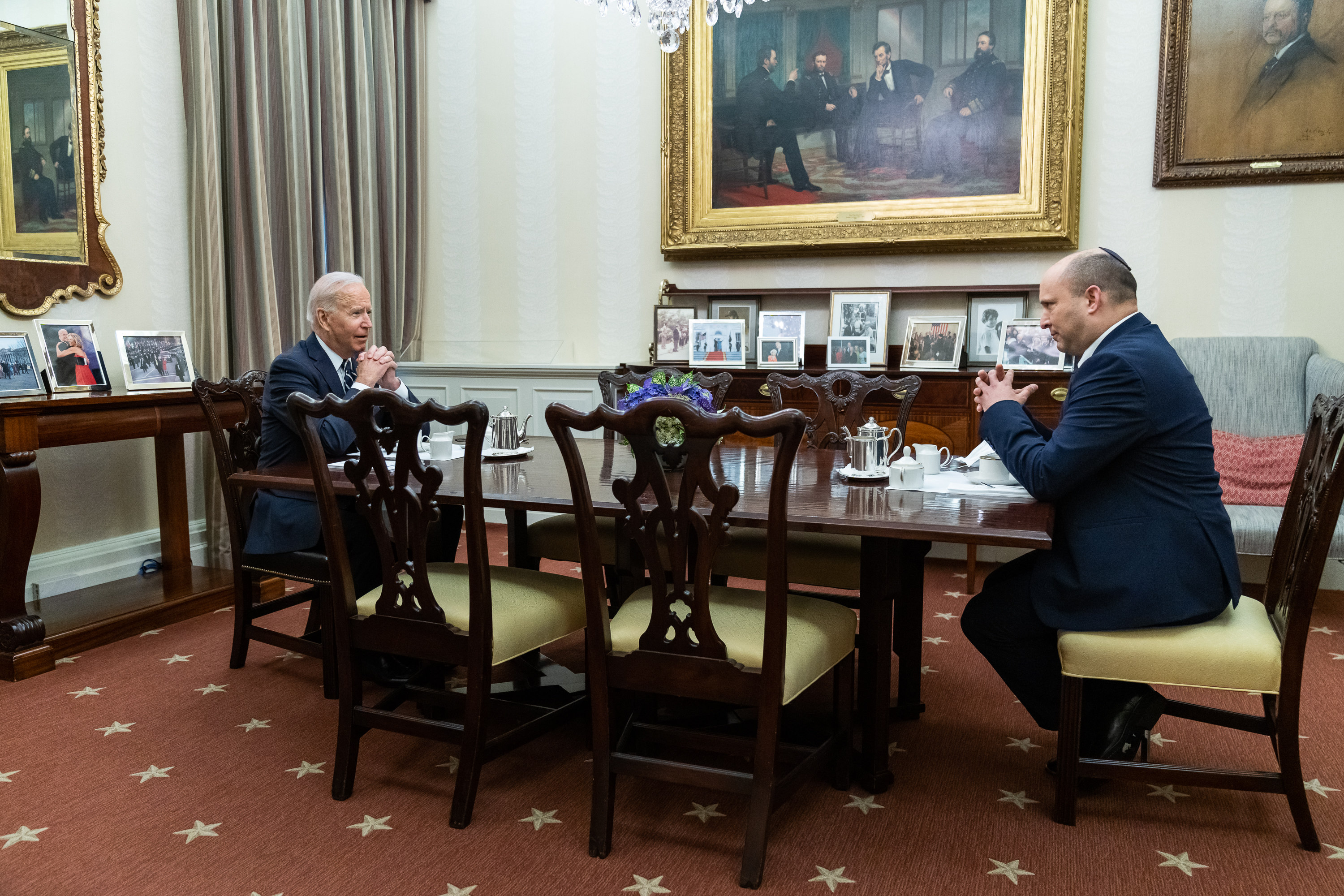

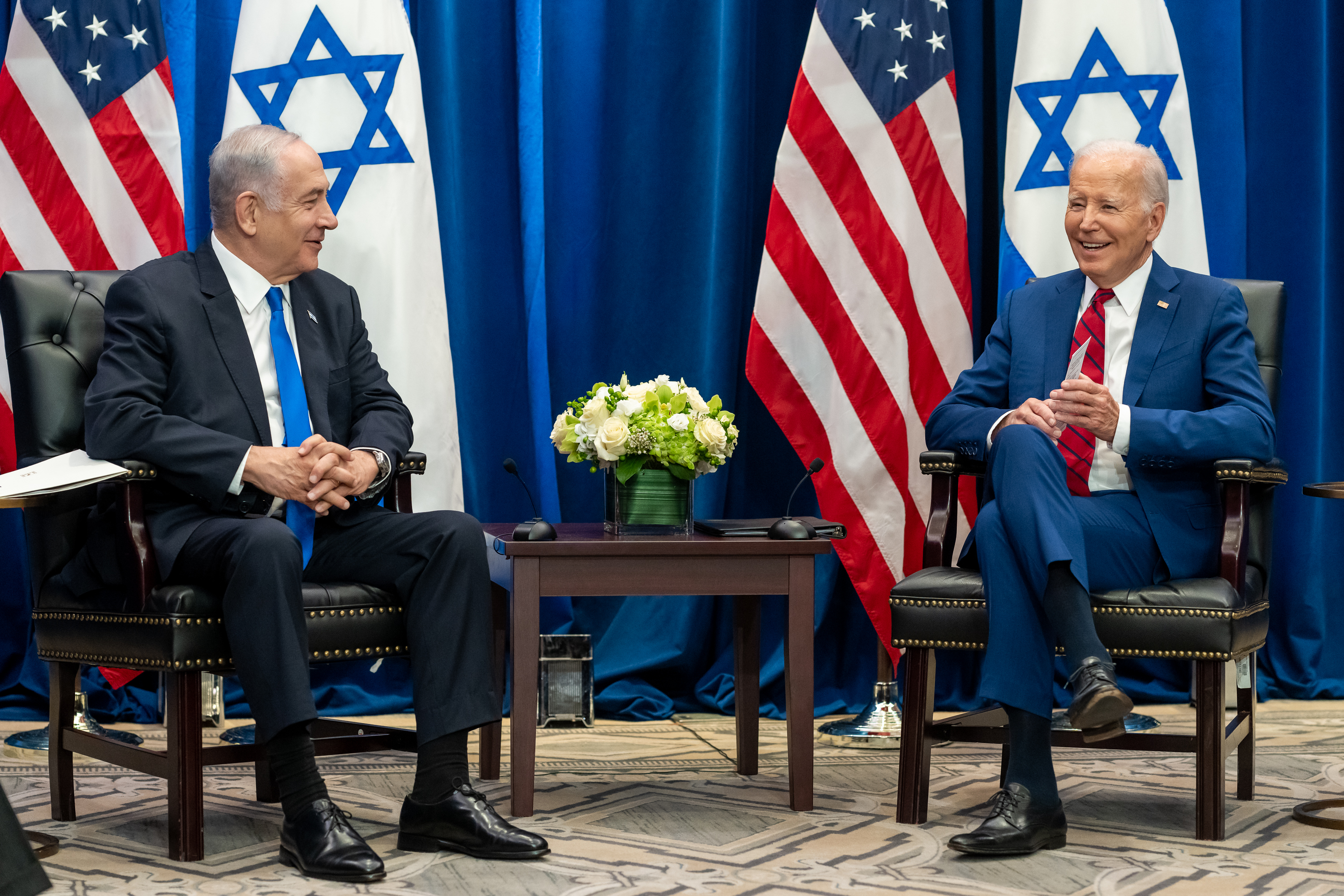

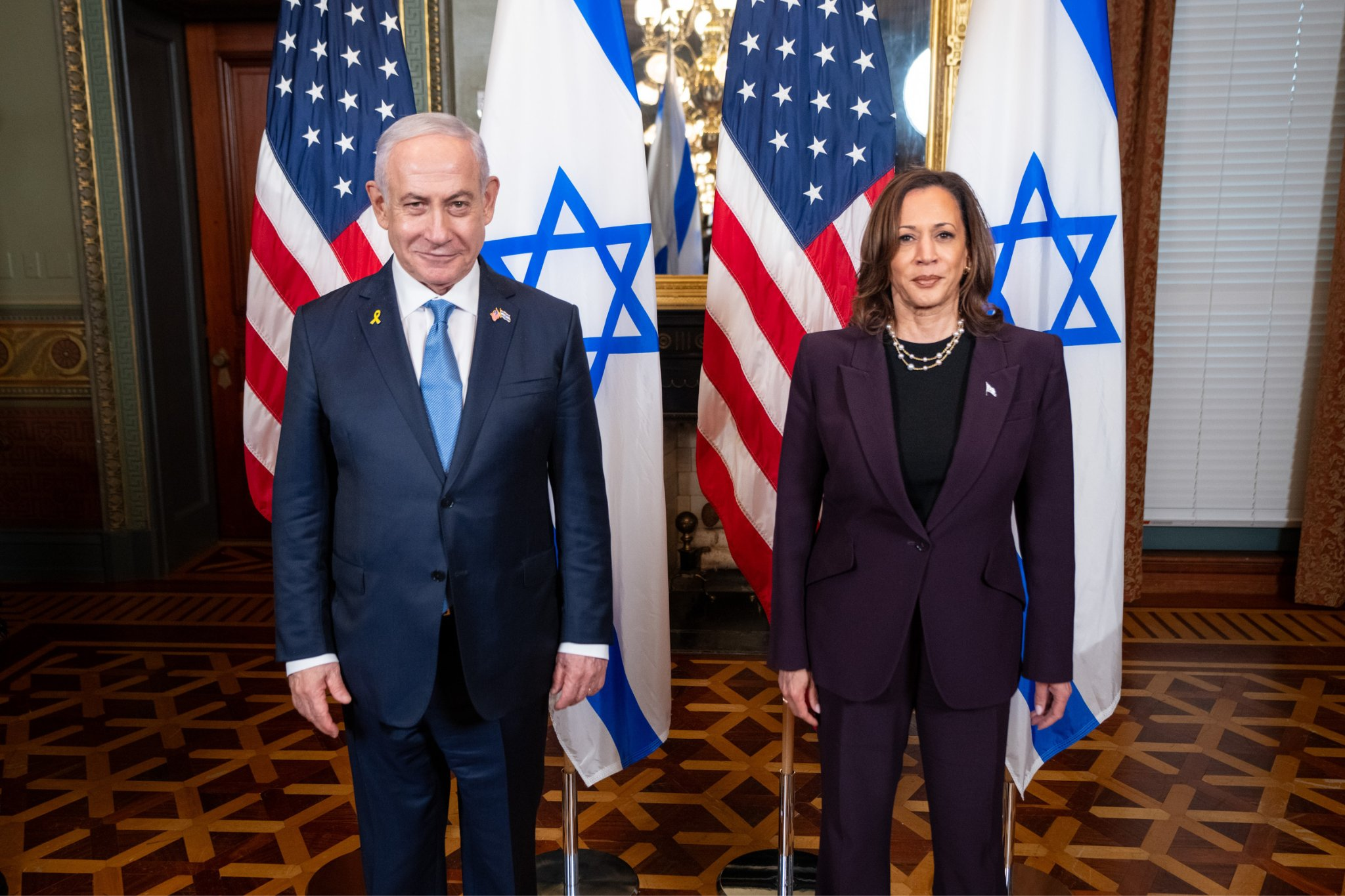

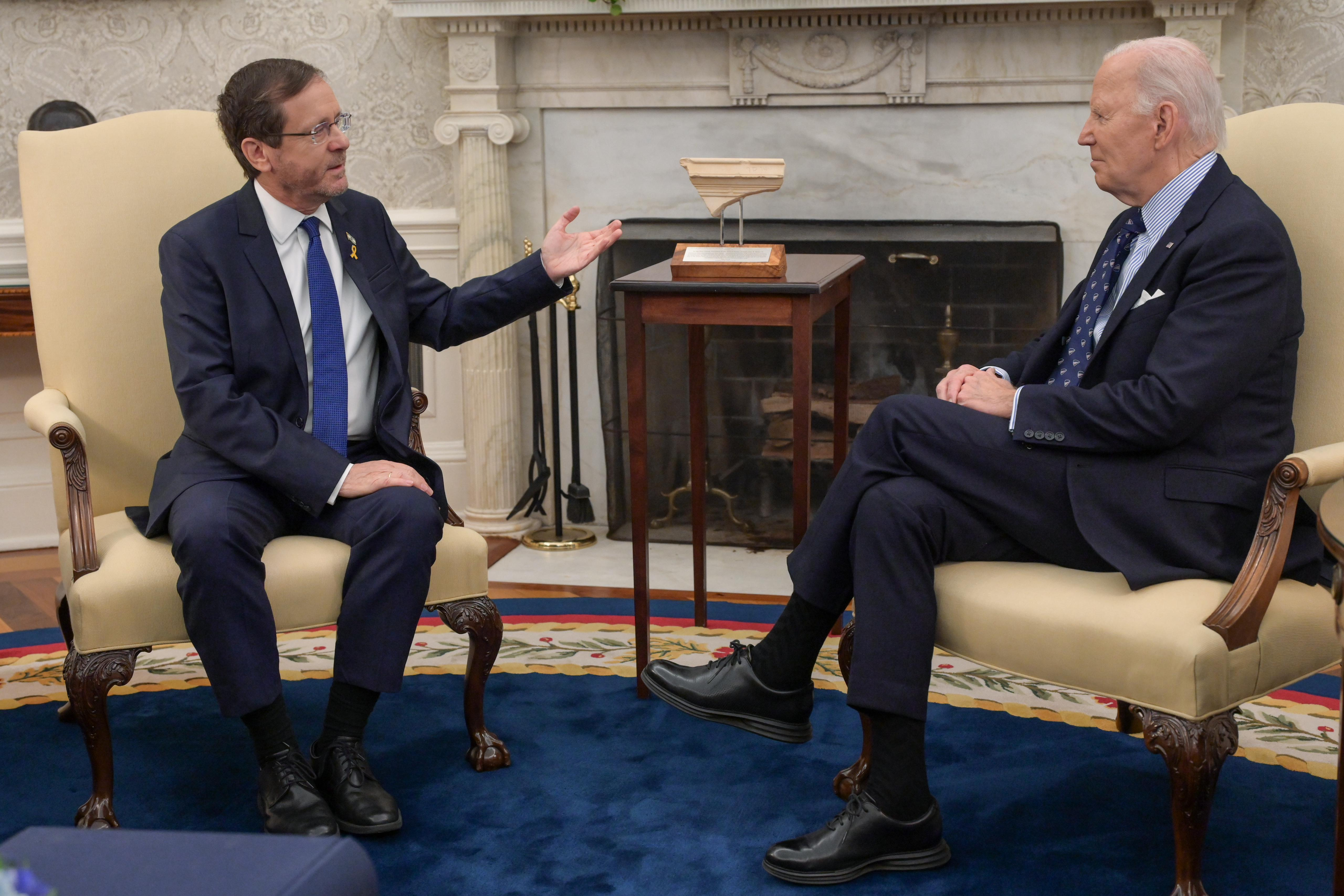

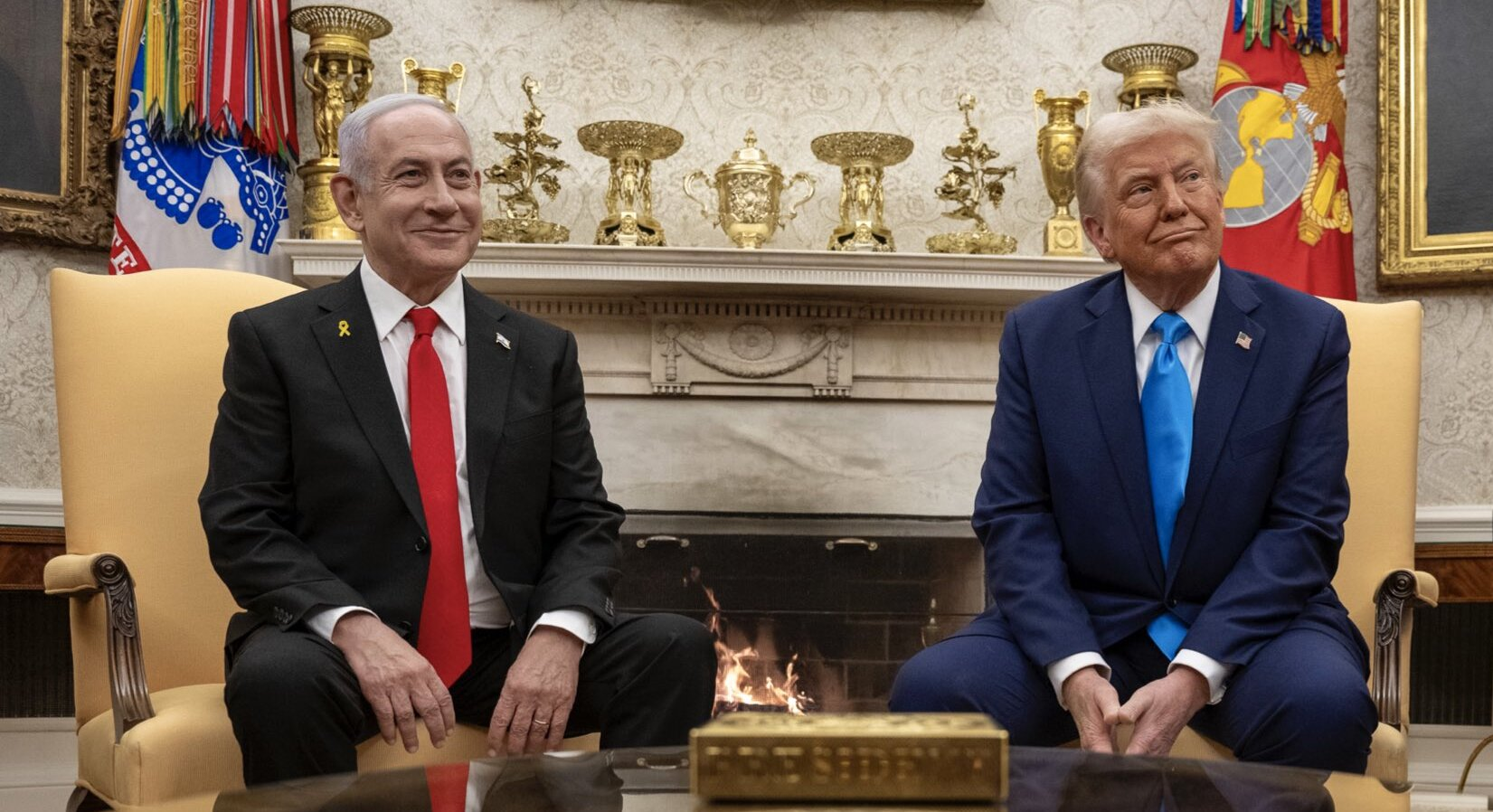

== Japan ==
Table of Trips
Start	End	Guest	Title	Reason
September 3, 1951	September 5, 1951	Shigeru Yoshida	Prime Minister	Attended the Peace Conference in San Francisco.
November 7, 1954	November 13, 1954	Shigeru Yoshida	Prime Minister	In U.S. November 2–14, while returning from Europe, visiting New York City, San Francisco and Honolulu, Hawaii
June 19, 1957	June 22, 1957	Nobusuke Kishi	Prime Minister	Official visit. In U.S. June 16–29. Also visited Honolulu, Hawaii, San Francisco, New York City and Los Angeles.
January 17, 1960	January 17, 1960	Nobusuke Kishi	Prime Minister	Informal visit. Signed Treaty of Mutual Cooperation and Security January 19. In U.S. January 16–23.
June 20, 1961	June 23, 1961	Hayato Ikeda	Prime Minister	Official visit. In U.S.June 18–29, visiting Honolulu, Hawaii, Los Angeles, New York City, and Chicago. Was in Canada June 25–26.
November 24, 1963	November 24, 1963	Hayato Ikeda	Prime Minister	Attended Funeral of President Kennedy
January 12, 1965	January 14, 1965	Eisaku Satō	Prime Minister	Official visit. In U.S. January 9–16, visiting Honolulu, Hawaii, San Francisco, New York City, and Los Angeles
November 13, 1967	November 15, 1967	Eisaku Satō	Prime Minister	Official visit. In U.S. November 12–19; visited New York City and Springfield
November 19, 1969	November 21, 1969	Eisaku Satō	Prime Minister	Official visit. In U.S. November 16–25; visited New York City and San Francisco
October 24, 1970	October 24, 1970	Eisaku Satō	Prime Minister	Attended White House dinner on 25th Anniversary of the UN; met privately with President Nixon.
September 26, 1971	September 26, 1971	Hirohito	Emperor	Unofficial visit; President Nixon met with the Emperor and Empress, who were on their way to Europe, at Elmendorf Air Force Base, Alaska.
January 6, 1972	January 7, 1972	Eisaku Satō	Prime Minister	Discussed bilateral relations with President Nixon at San Clemente
August 30, 1972	September 1, 1972	Kakuei Tanaka	Prime Minister	Official visit in Hawaii.
July 31, 1973	August 31, 1973	Kakuei Tanaka	Prime Minister	Official visit. Private visit to Washington, D.C. July 29–30. Afterwards visited New York City, Chicago, San Francisco. Departed U.S. August 5.
August 21, 1974	August 21, 1974	Kakuei Tanaka	Prime Minister	Private visit.
August 3, 1975	August 3, 1975	Takeo Miki	Prime Minister	Official visit. In U.S. August 2–10; visited Seattle, New York City, and Los Angeles.
October 24, 1975	October 2, 1975	Hirohito	Emperor	State visit; first visit to the continental U.S. In U.S. September 30 – October 13; Visited Williamsburg, Woods Hole, New York City, Chicago, Los Angeles, San Diego, San Francisco, and Honolulu, Hawaii.
June 26, 1976	June 28, 1976	Takeo Miki	Prime Minister	Attended G-8 Economic Summit Meeting in Dorado, Puerto Rico
June 29, 1976	June 30, 1976	Takeo Miki	Prime Minister	Private visit. Presented Bicentennial gift.
March 20, 1977	March 23, 1977	Takeo Fukuda	Prime Minister	Official visit.
May 1, 1978	May 3, 1978	Takeo Fukuda	Prime Minister	Official visit.
April 30, 1979	May 4, 1979	Masayoshi Ohira	Prime Minister	Official visit. Afterwards visited New York City and Los Angeles. Departed May 6.
April 30, 1980	May 1, 1980	Masayoshi Ohira	Prime Minister	Official visit.
May 6, 1981	May 9, 1981	Zenko Suzuki	Prime Minister	Official visit. In U.S. May 4; visited New York City
January 17, 1983	January 20, 1983	Yasuhiro Nakasone	Prime Minister	Official working visit.
May 26, 1983	May 28, 1983	Yasuhiro Nakasone	Prime Minister	Official working visit.
May 28, 1983	May 31, 1983	Yasuhiro Nakasone	Prime Minister	Attended G-8 Economic Summit Meeting, Williamsburg
January 1, 1985	January 2, 1985	Yasuhiro Nakasone	Prime Minister	Official Working Visit in Los Angeles.
October 25, 1985	October 25, 1985	Yasuhiro Nakasone	Prime Minister	Met with President Reagan in New York City
April 12, 1986	April 14, 1986	Yasuhiro Nakasone	Prime Minister	Official Working Visit. Met with President Reagan at Washington, D.C. and Camp David.
April 29, 1987	May 5, 1987	Yasuhiro Nakasone	Prime Minister	Official Visit. Private visit to Maui, Hawaii, afterward.
February 12, 1988	February 15, 1988	Noboru Takeshita	Prime Minister	Official Working Visit.
February 1, 1989	February 3, 1989	Noboru Takeshita	Prime Minister	Official Working Visit. Private visit to Los Angeles afterward.
August 31, 1989	September 2, 1989	Toshiki Kaifu	Prime Minister	Official Working Visit. In U.S. August 30; visited San Francisco. Private visit to Boston afterwards.
March 2, 1990	March 3, 1990	Toshiki Kaifu	Prime Minister	Discussed bilateral trade with President Bush at Palm Springs
July 7, 1990	July 7, 1990	Toshiki Kaifu	Prime Minister	Private meeting with President Bush in Houston.
July 8, 1990	July 11, 1990	Toshiki Kaifu	Prime Minister	Attended G-8 Economic Summit Meeting in Houston
September 29, 1990	September 29, 1990	Toshiki Kaifu	Prime Minister	Met with President Bush at the UN General Assembly.
April 4, 1991	April 4, 1991	Toshiki Kaifu	Prime Minister	Informal meeting with President Bush in Newport Beach
July 11, 1991	July 11, 1991	Toshiki Kaifu	Prime Minister	Informal meeting with President Bush at Kennebunkport
January 30, 1992	January 30, 1992	Kiichi Miyazawa	Prime Minister	Met with President Bush during a UN Security Council Summit in New York City.
June 30, 1992	July 6, 1992	Kiichi Miyazawa	Prime Minister	Official working visit.
April 15, 1993	April 17, 1993	Kiichi Miyazawa	Prime Minister	Met with President Clinton during a private visit.
September 27, 1993	September 27, 1993	Morihiro Hosokawa	Prime Minister	Met with President Clinton at the UN General Assembly in New York City.
November 19, 1993	November 20, 1993	Morihiro Hosokawa	Prime Minister	Attended Asia-Pacific Economic Cooperation meeting in Seattle.
February 10, 1994	February 12, 1994	Morihiro Hosokawa	Prime Minister	Working visit.
June 11, 1994	June 15, 1994	Akihito	Emperor	State Visit. Arrived in the U.S. June 10; visited Atlanta and Charleston. Later visited Charlottesville, New York City.
January 10, 1995	January 12, 1995	Tomiichi Murayama	Prime Minister	Official working visit.
February 23, 1996	February 23, 1996	Ryutaro Hashimoto	Prime Minister	Informal meeting in Santa Monica.
September 24, 1996	September 24, 1996	Ryutaro Hashimoto	Prime Minister	Met with President Clinton at the UN General Assembly.
April 24, 1997	April 26, 1997	Ryutaro Hashimoto	Prime Minister	Official working visit.
June 19, 1997	June 22, 1997	Ryutaro Hashimoto	Prime Minister	Held a pre-summit meeting with President Clinton and attended the G-8 Economic Summit in Denver.
September 22, 1998	September 22, 1998	Keizo Obuchi	Prime Minister	Met with President Clinton at the UN General Assembly in New York City.
May 2, 1999	May 4, 1999	Keizo Obuchi	Prime Minister	Official visit. Arrived in the U.S. April 29; visited Los Angeles and Chicago.
May 4, 2000	May 5, 2000	Yoshiro Mori	Prime Minister	Working visit.
March 18, 2001	March 19, 2001	Yoshiro Mori	Prime Minister	Working visit.
June 30, 2001	June 30, 2001	Junichiro Koizumi	Prime Minister	Working visit at Camp David.
September 24, 2001	September 25, 2001	Junichiro Koizumi	Prime Minister	Working visit.
September 12, 2002	September 12, 2002	Junichiro Koizumi	Prime Minister	Met with President Bush at the UN General Assembly in New York City.
May 22, 2003	May 23, 2003	Junichiro Koizumi	Prime Minister	Working visit at Crawford Ranch.
June 8, 2004	June 10, 2004	Junichiro Koizumi	Prime Minister	Attended G-8 Economic Summit at Sea Island.
September 21, 2004	September 21, 2004	Junichiro Koizumi	Prime Minister	Met with President Bush at the UN General Assembly in New York City.
June 28, 2006	June 30, 2006	Junichiro Koizumi	Prime Minister	Official visit. Also visited Memphis, June 30.
April 26, 2007	April 27, 2007	Shinzo Abe	Prime Minister	Working visit. Met with President Bush at Camp David.
November 15, 2007	November 16, 2007	Yasuo Fukuda	Prime Minister	Working visit.
November 14, 2008	November 15, 2008	Taro Aso	Prime Minister	Attended the G-20 Economic Summit meeting.
February 24, 2009	February 24, 2009	Taro Aso	Prime Minister	Working visit.
September 23, 2009	September 23, 2009	Yukio Hatoyama	Prime Minister	Met with President Obama at the UN General Assembly in New York City.
September 24, 2009	September 25, 2009	Yukio Hatoyama	Prime Minister	Attended the G-20 Economic Summit in Pittsburgh.
April 12, 2010	April 13, 2010	Yukio Hatoyama	Prime Minister	Attended the Nuclear Security Summit.
September 23, 2010	September 23, 2010	Naoto Kan	Prime Minister	Met with President Obama at the UN General Assembly in New York City.
September 23, 2011	September 23, 2011	Yoshihiko Noda	Prime Minister	Met with President Obama at the UN General Assembly in New York City.
November 10, 2011	November 13, 2011	Yoshihiko Noda	Prime Minister	Attended the Asia-Pacific Economic Cooperation Summit at Honolulu and Kapolei, Hawaii.
April 30, 2012	April 30, 2012	Yoshihiko Noda	Prime Minister	Working visit.
May 18, 2012	May 19, 2012	Yoshihiko Noda	Prime Minister	Attended the G-8 Economic Summit at Camp David.
February 22, 2013	February 22, 2013	Shinzo Abe	Prime Minister	Working visit.
April 27, 2015	April 28, 2015	Shinzo Abe	Prime Minister	Official visit.
March 31, 2016	April 1, 2016	Shinzo Abe	Prime Minister	Attended the Nuclear Security Summit.
November 17, 2016	November 17, 2016	Shinzo Abe	Prime Minister	Met with President-elect Trump in New York City.
December 27, 2016	December 27, 2016	Shinzo Abe	Prime Minister	Attended a memorial service at the U.S.S. Arizona Memorial, Pearl Harbor, Hawaii.
February 10, 2017	February 11, 2017	Shinzo Abe	Prime Minister	Official Working Visit. Also visited Mar-a-Lago, Florida.
April 17, 2018	April 19, 2018	Shinzo Abe	Prime Minister	Official Working Visit at Mar-a-Lago, Florida.
June 6, 2018	June 7, 2018	Shinzo Abe	Prime Minister	Official Working Visit.
April 26, 2019	April 27, 2019	Shinzo Abe	Prime Minister	Official Working Visit.
April 16, 2021	April 16, 2021	Yoshihide Suga	Prime Minister	Official Working Visit.
September 24, 2021	September 24, 2021	Yoshihide Suga	Prime Minister	Working Visit; Quad Leaders' Summit.
January 13, 2023	January 13, 2023	Fumio Kishida	Prime Minister	Official Working Visit.
August 18, 2023	August 18, 2023	Fumio Kishida	Prime Minister	Attended Trilateral Summit at Camp David, Maryland.
November 12, 2023	November 17, 2023	Fumio Kishida	Prime Minister	Attended the APEC Leaders' Summit at San Francisco, California.
April 10, 2024	April 10, 2024	Fumio Kishida	Prime Minister	Official Visit.
July 10, 2024	July 11, 2024	Fumio Kishida	Prime Minister	Attended NATO 75th Anniversary Summit in Washington, D.C.
September 21, 2024	September 21, 2024	Fumio Kishida	Prime Minister	Attended Quad Leaders' Summit in Claymont, Delaware.
February 6, 2025	February 8, 2025	Shigeru Ishiba	Prime Minister	Official Working Visit.
March 19, 2026	March 19, 2026	Sanae Takaichi	Prime Minister	Official Working Visit.

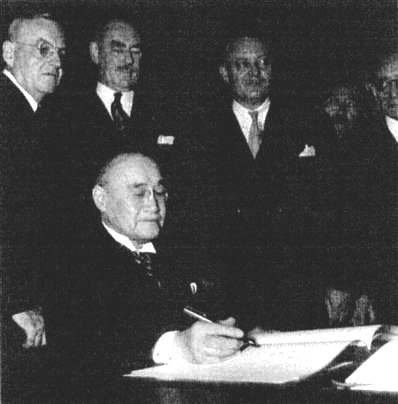

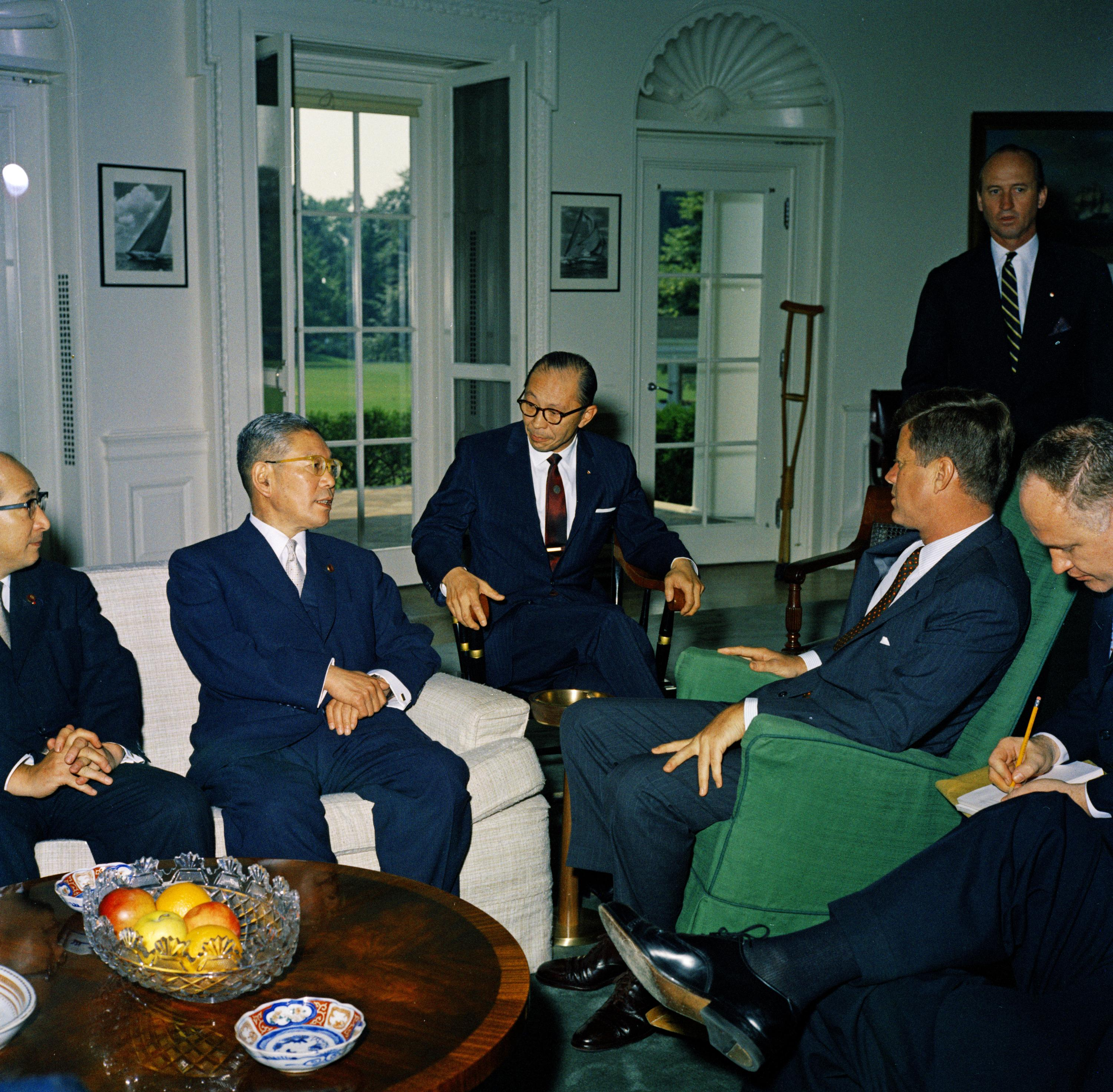

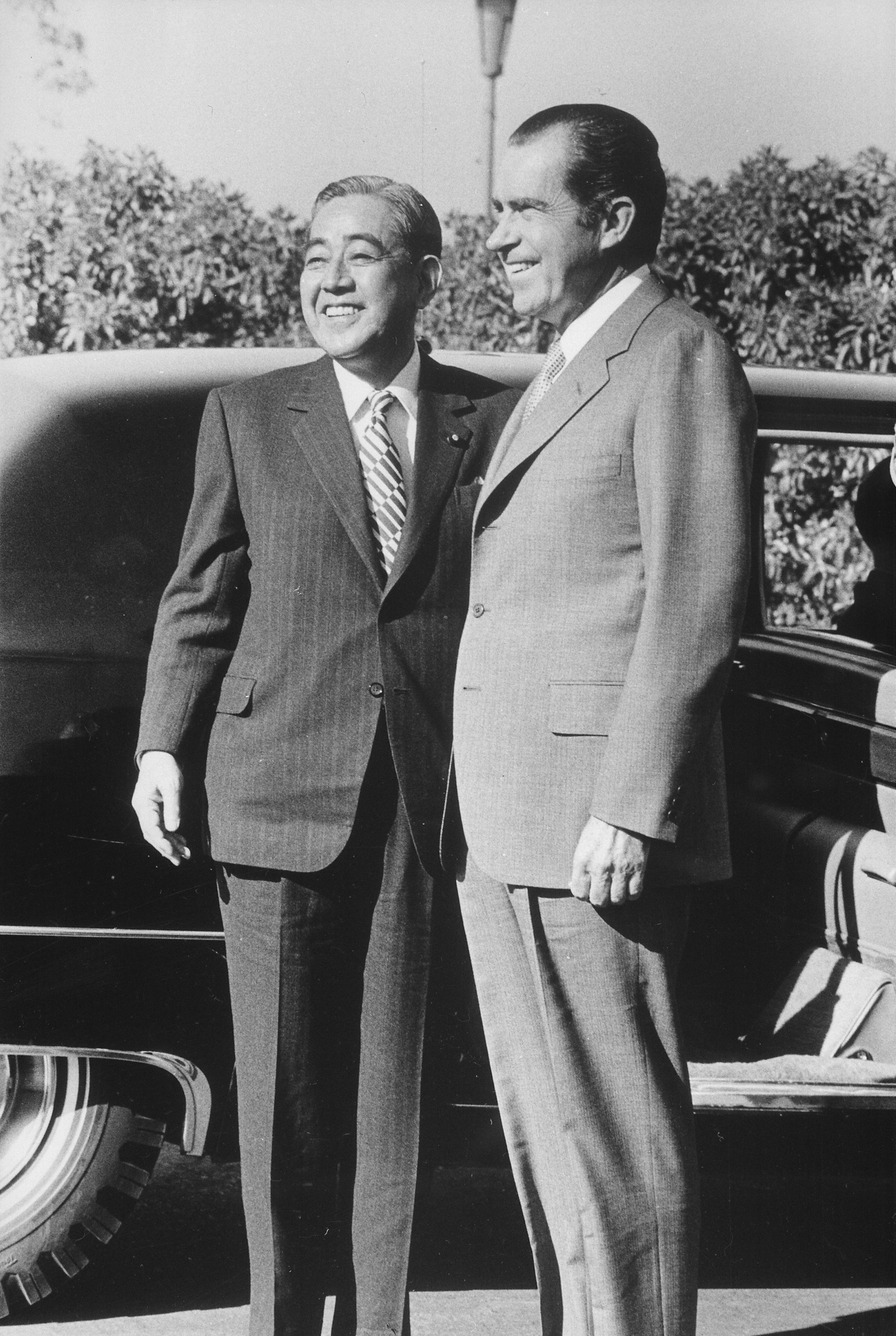

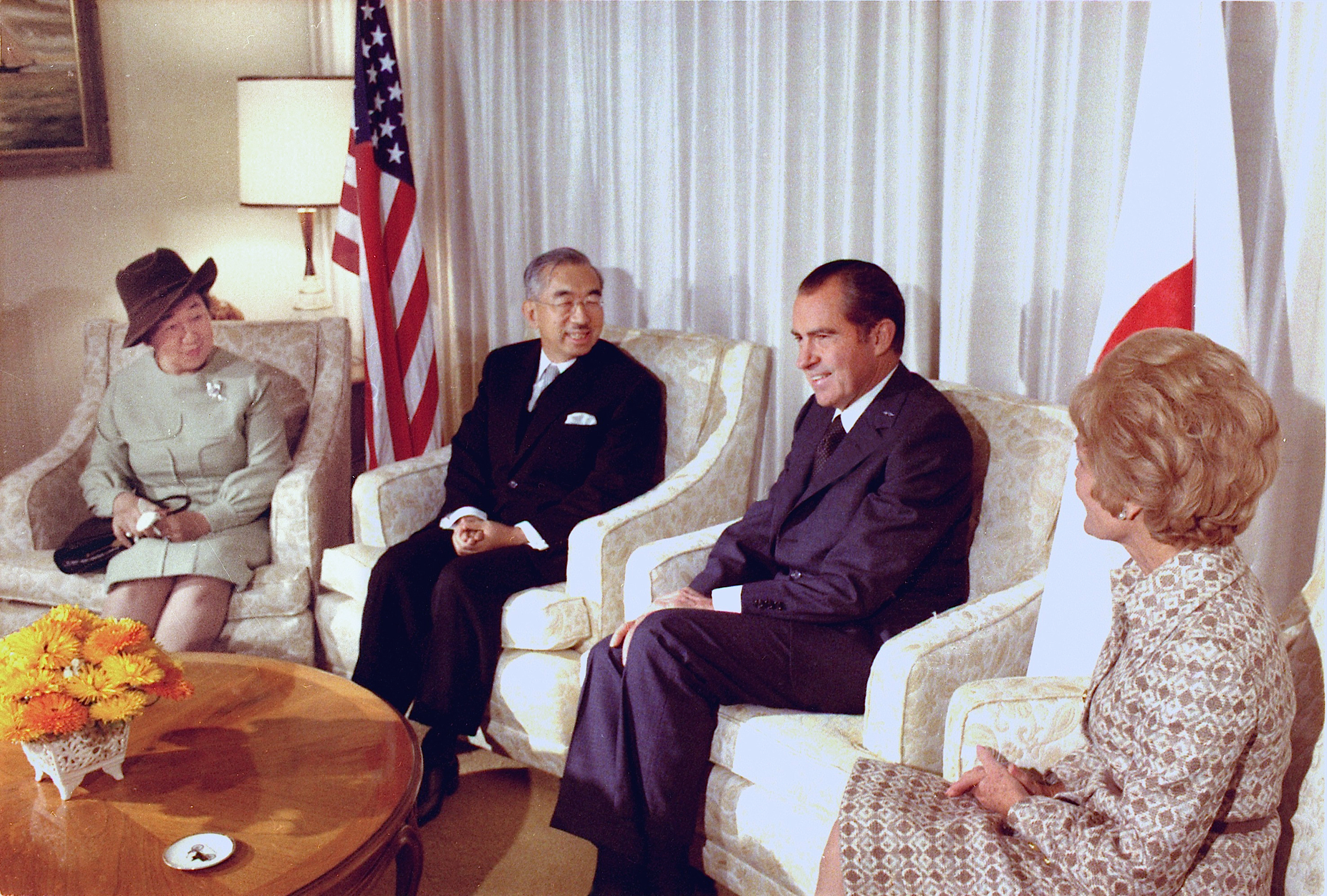

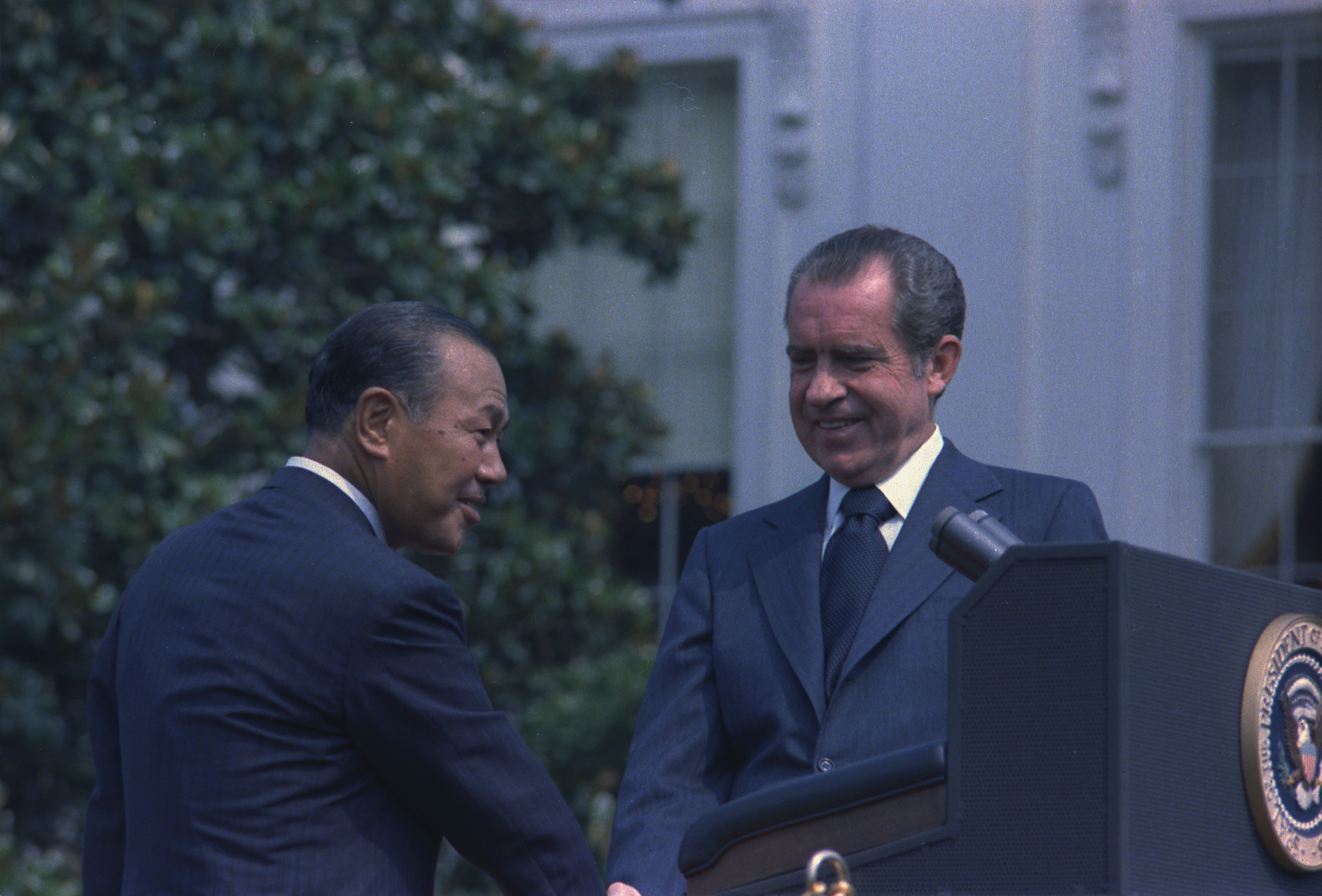

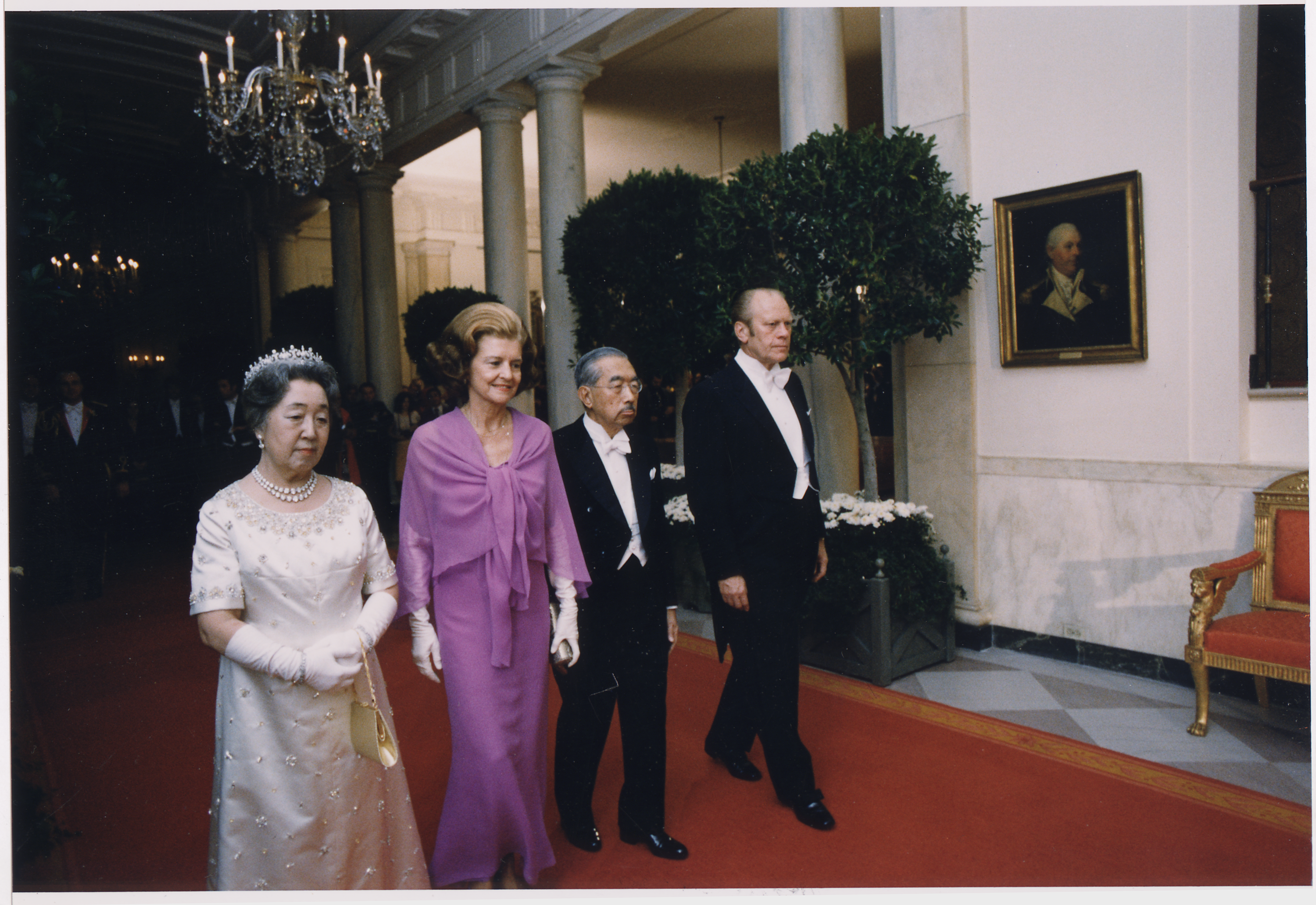

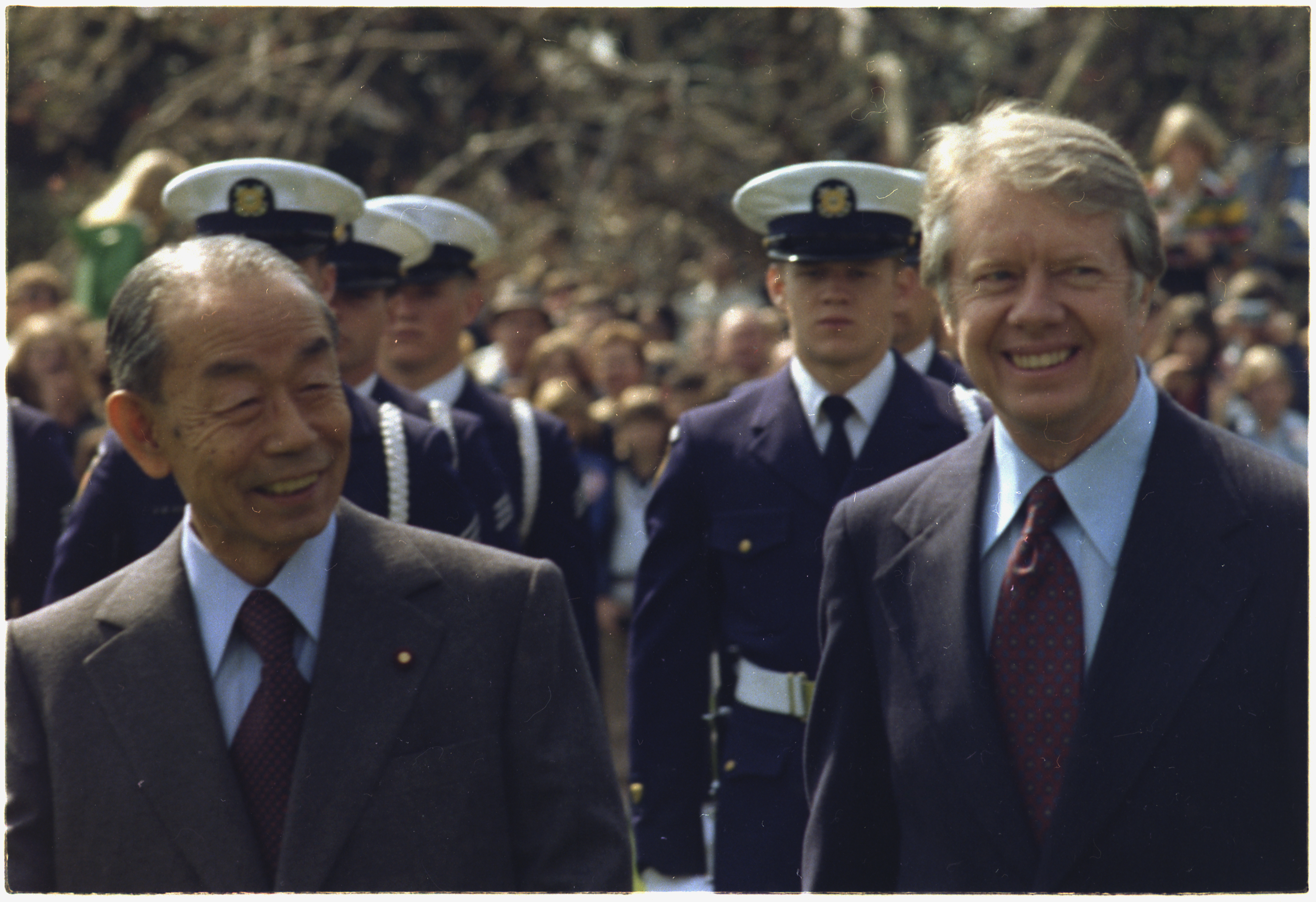

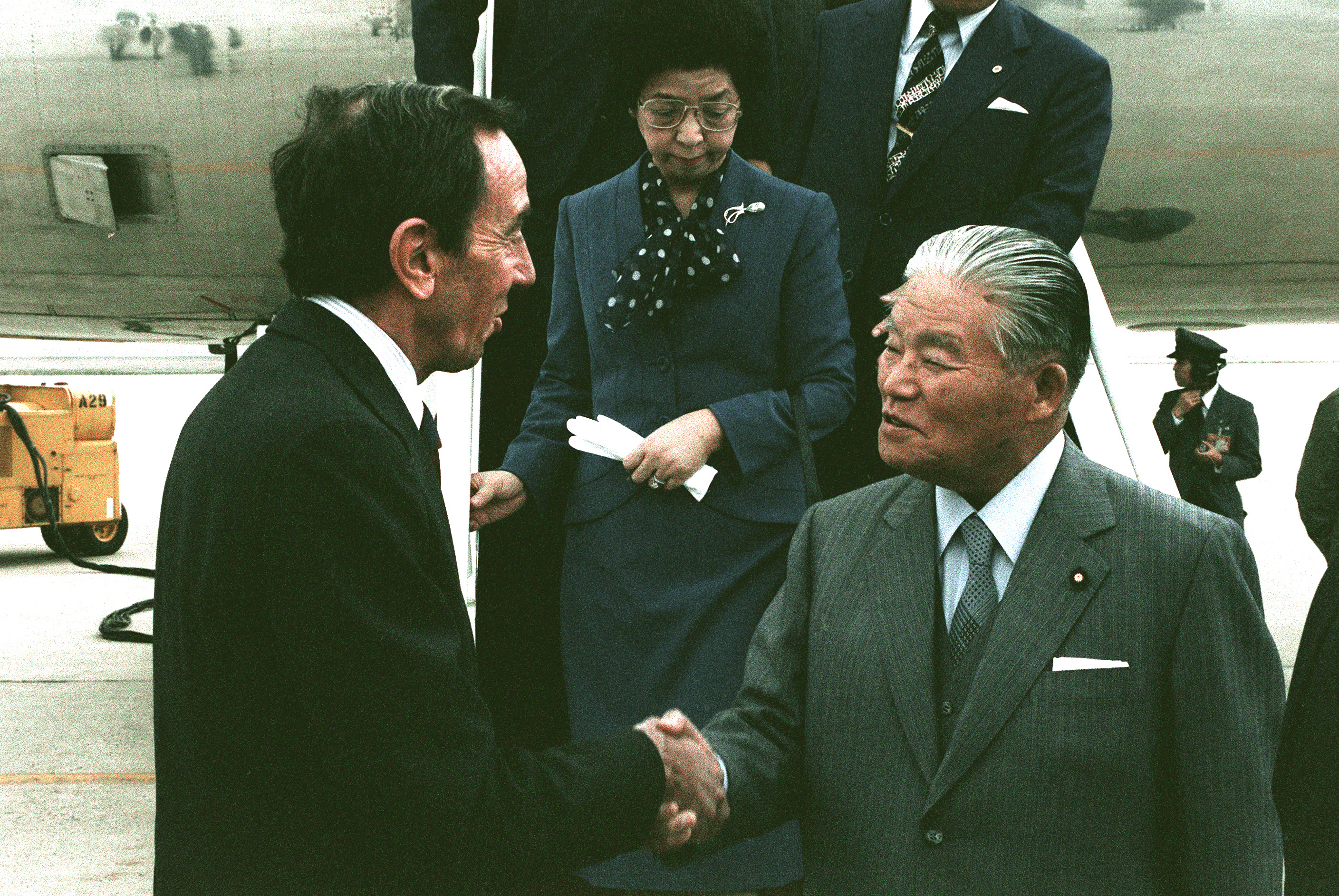

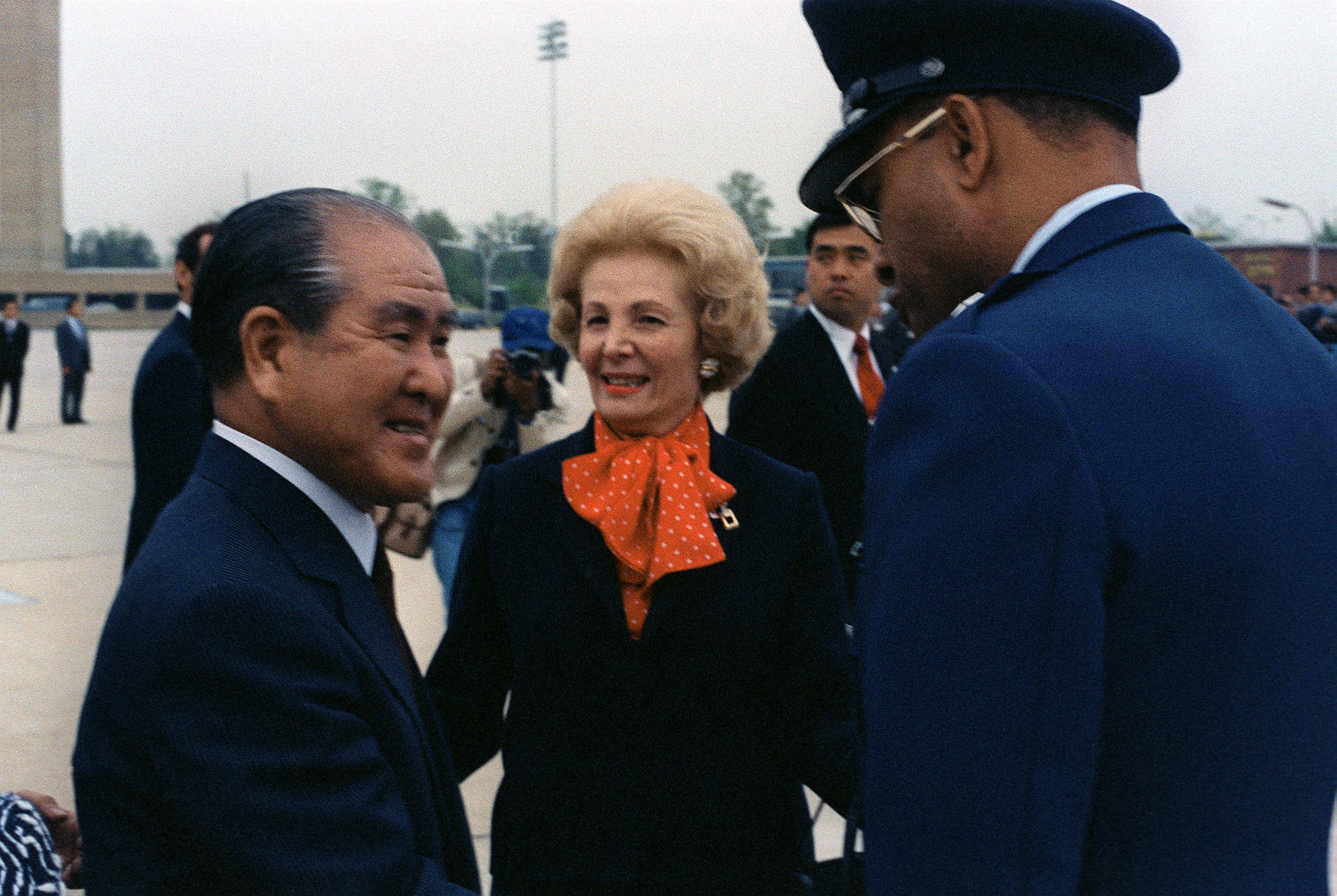

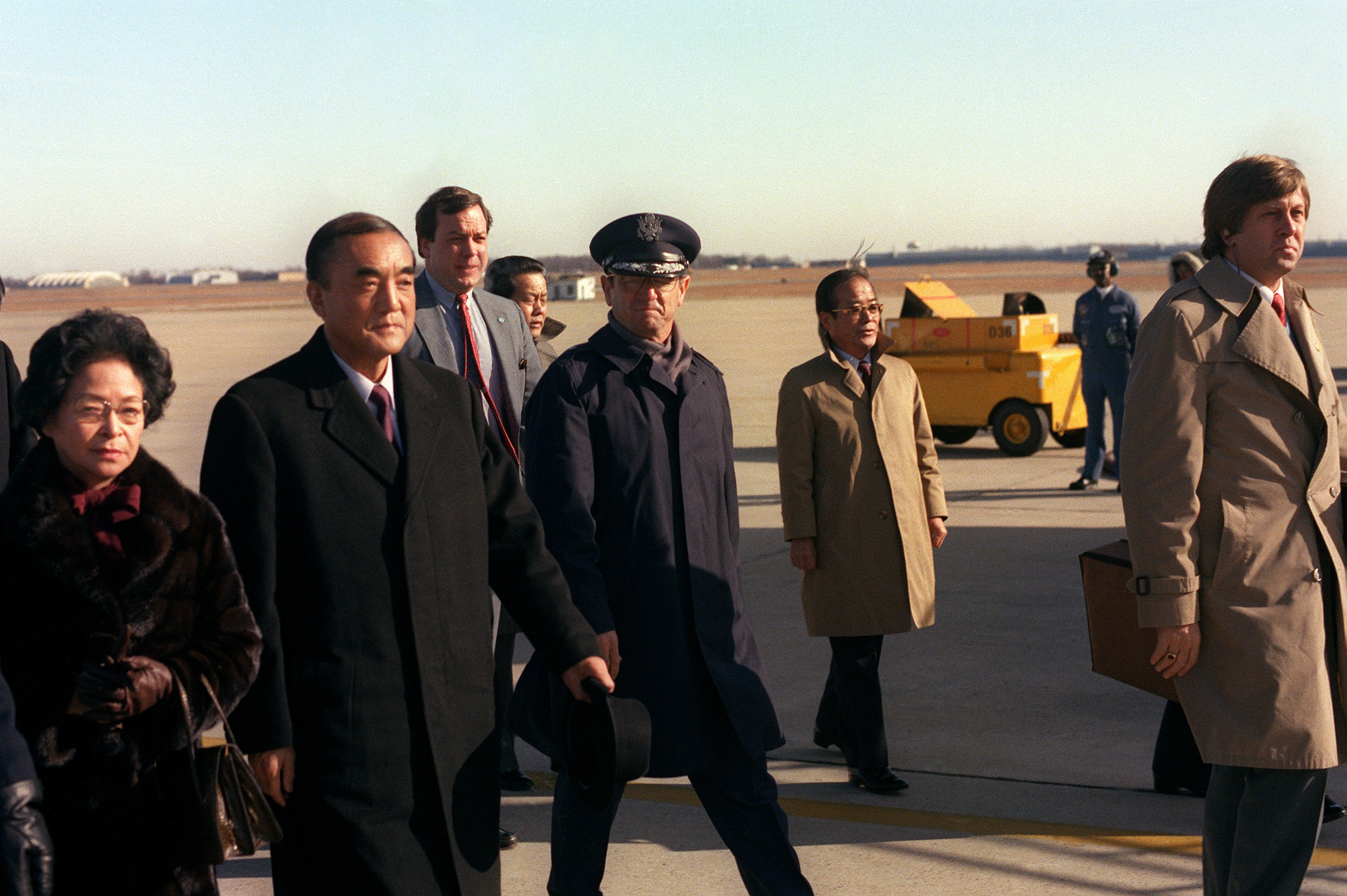

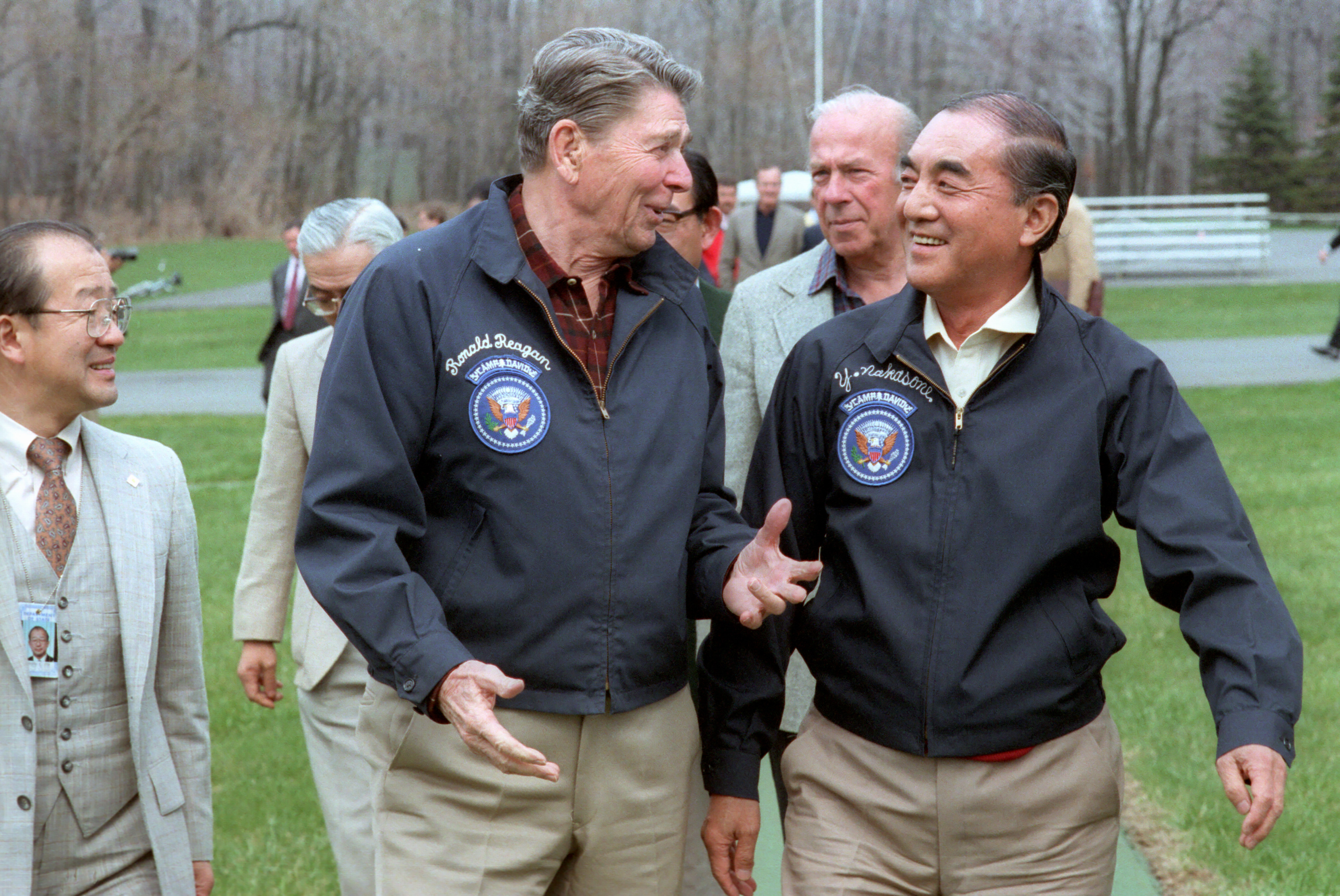

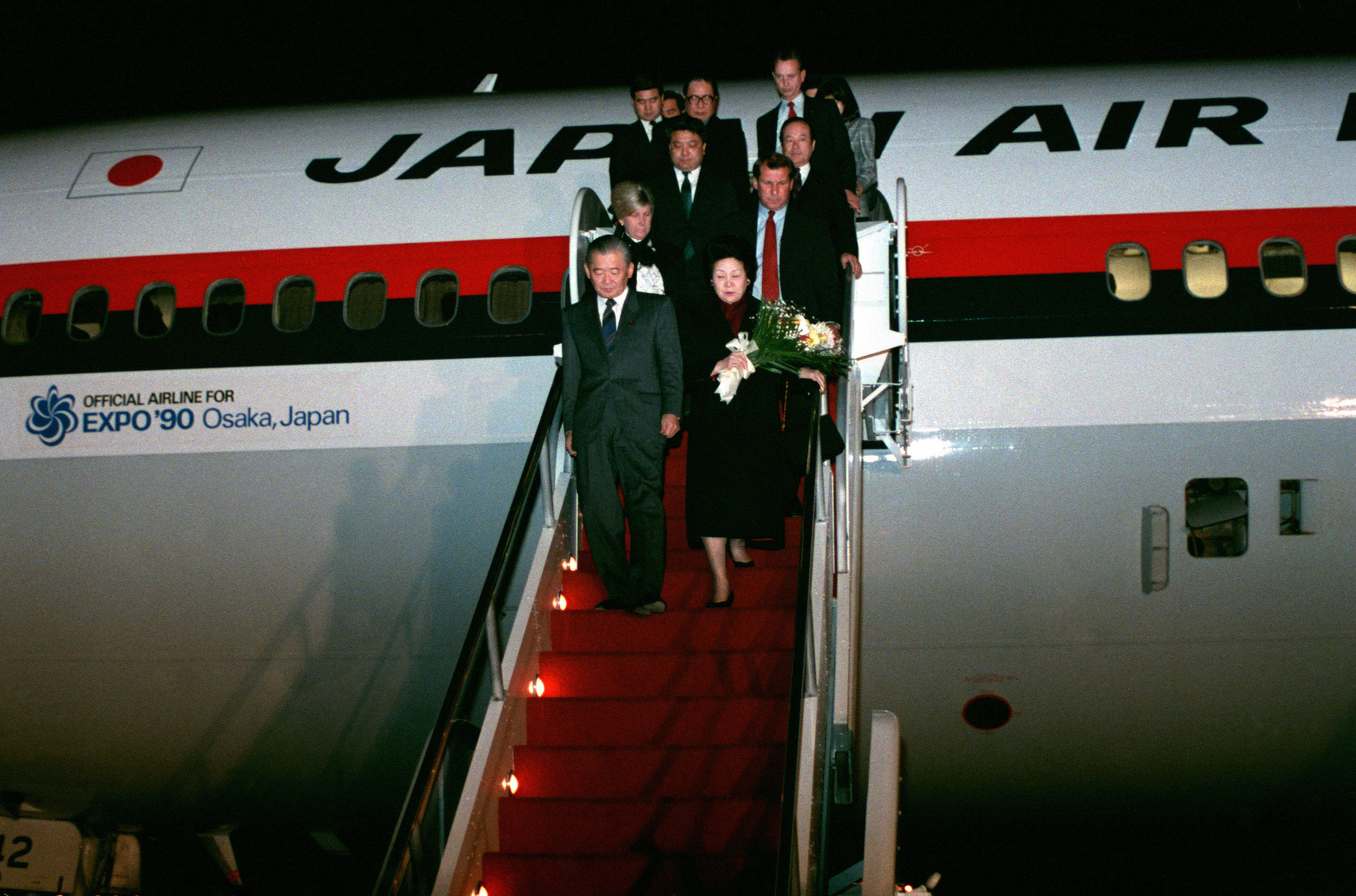

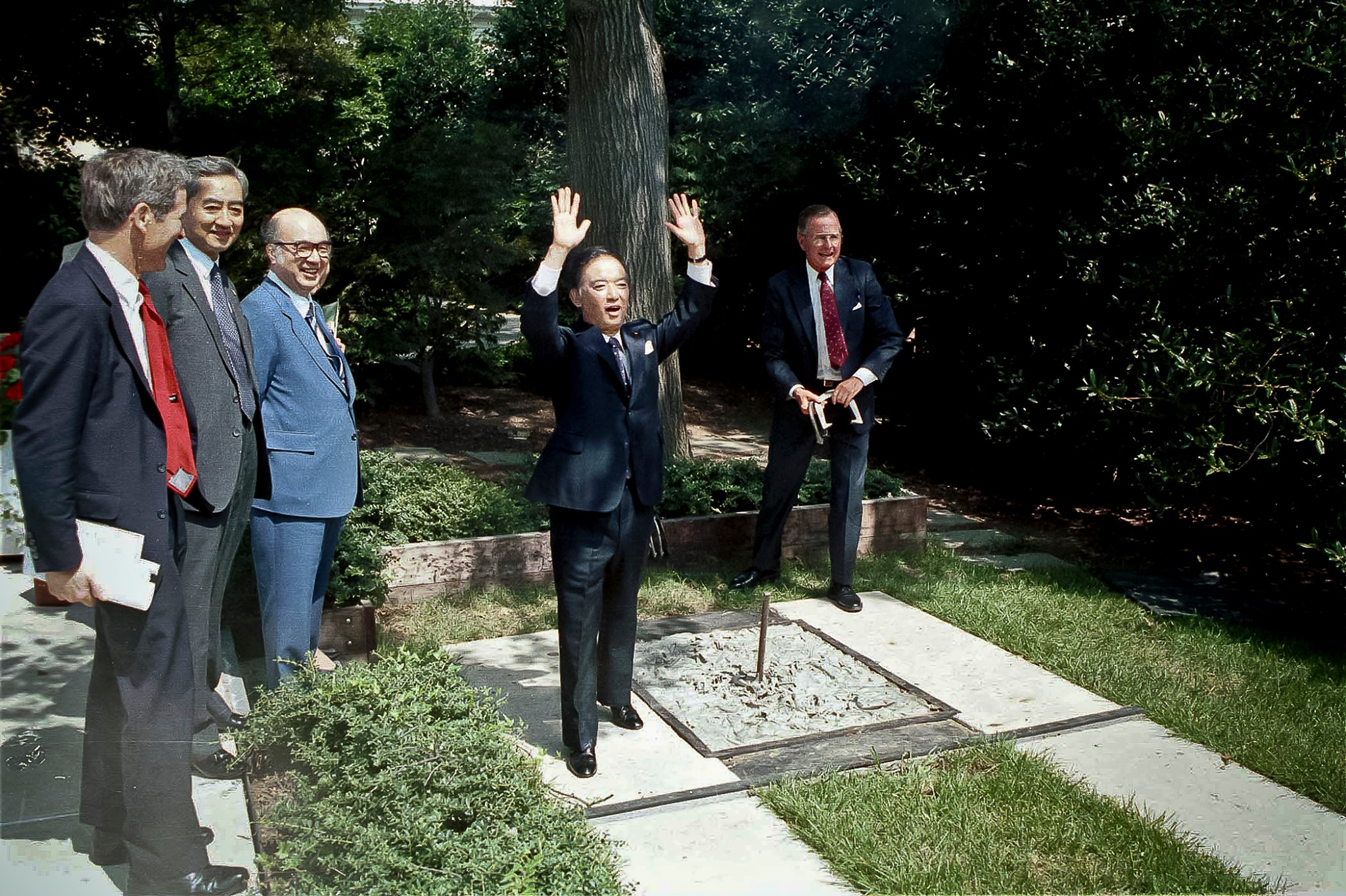

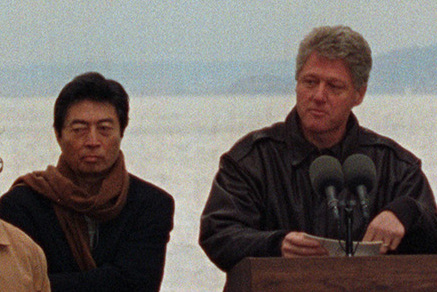

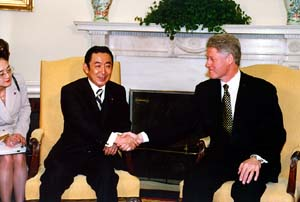

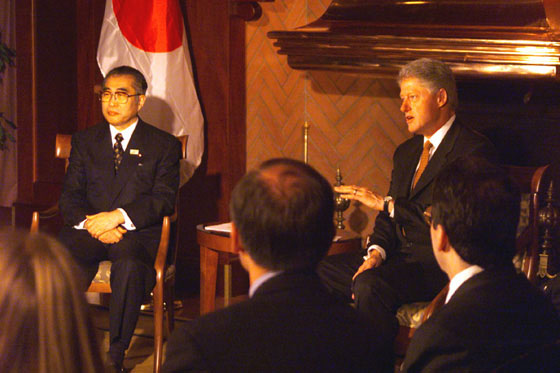

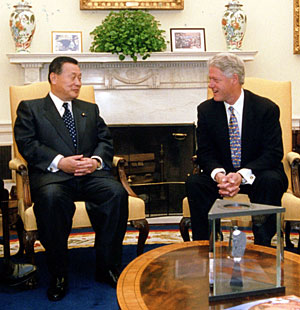

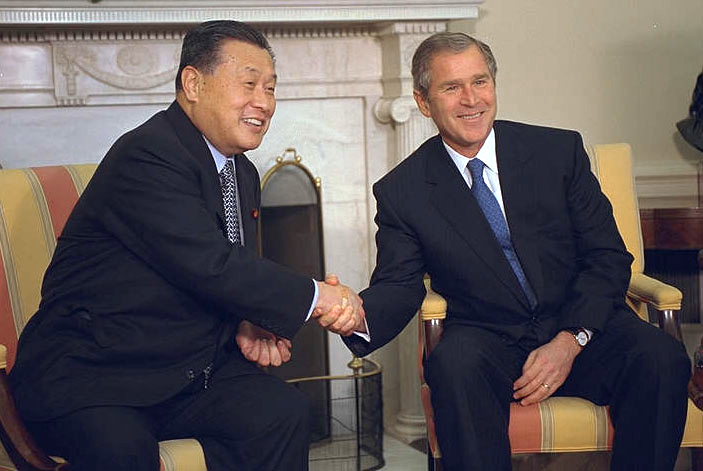

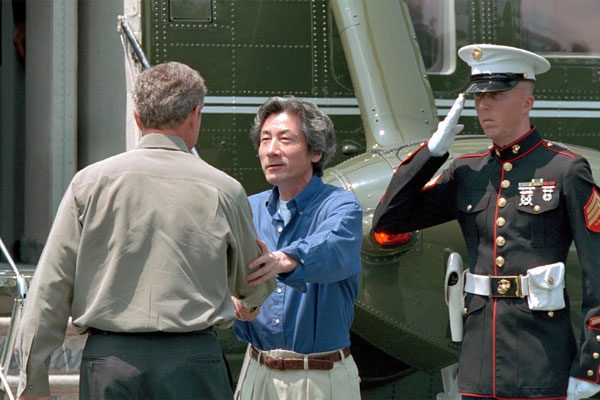

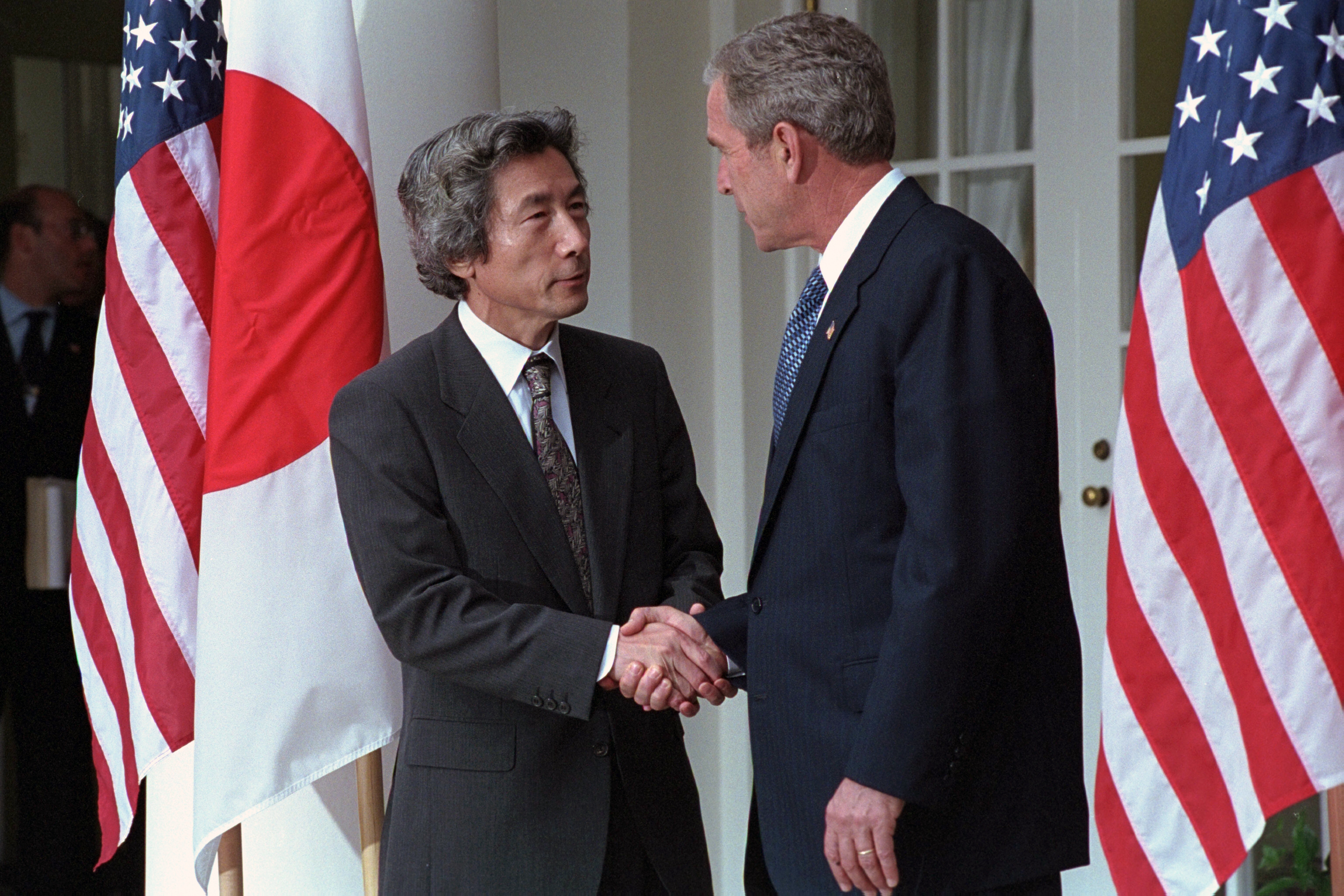

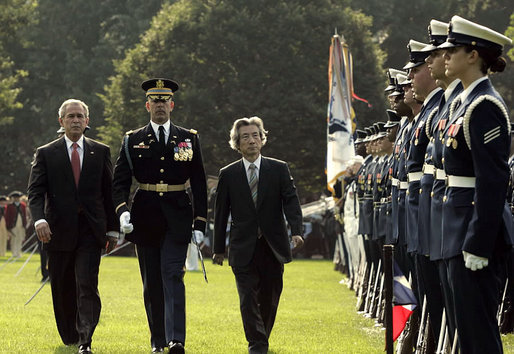

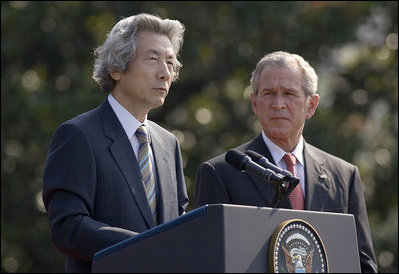

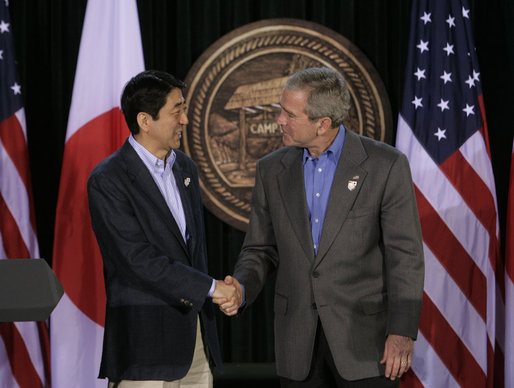

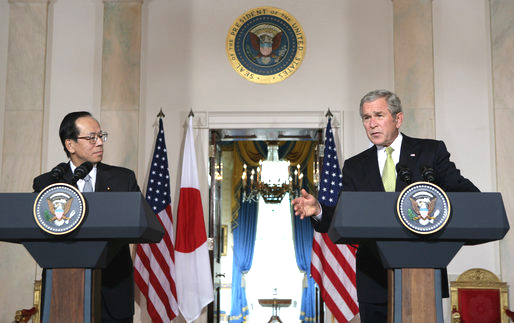

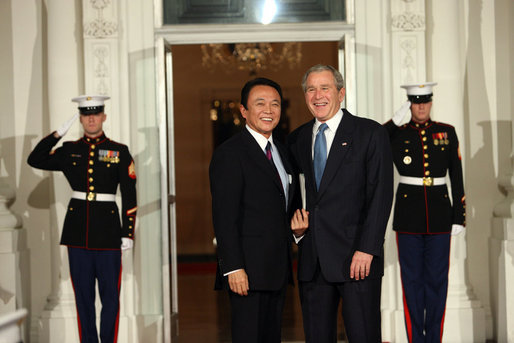

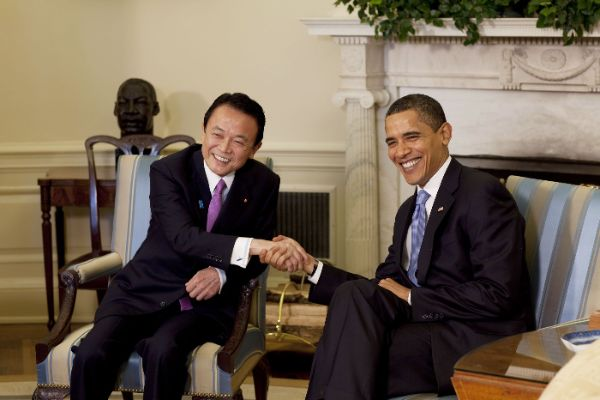

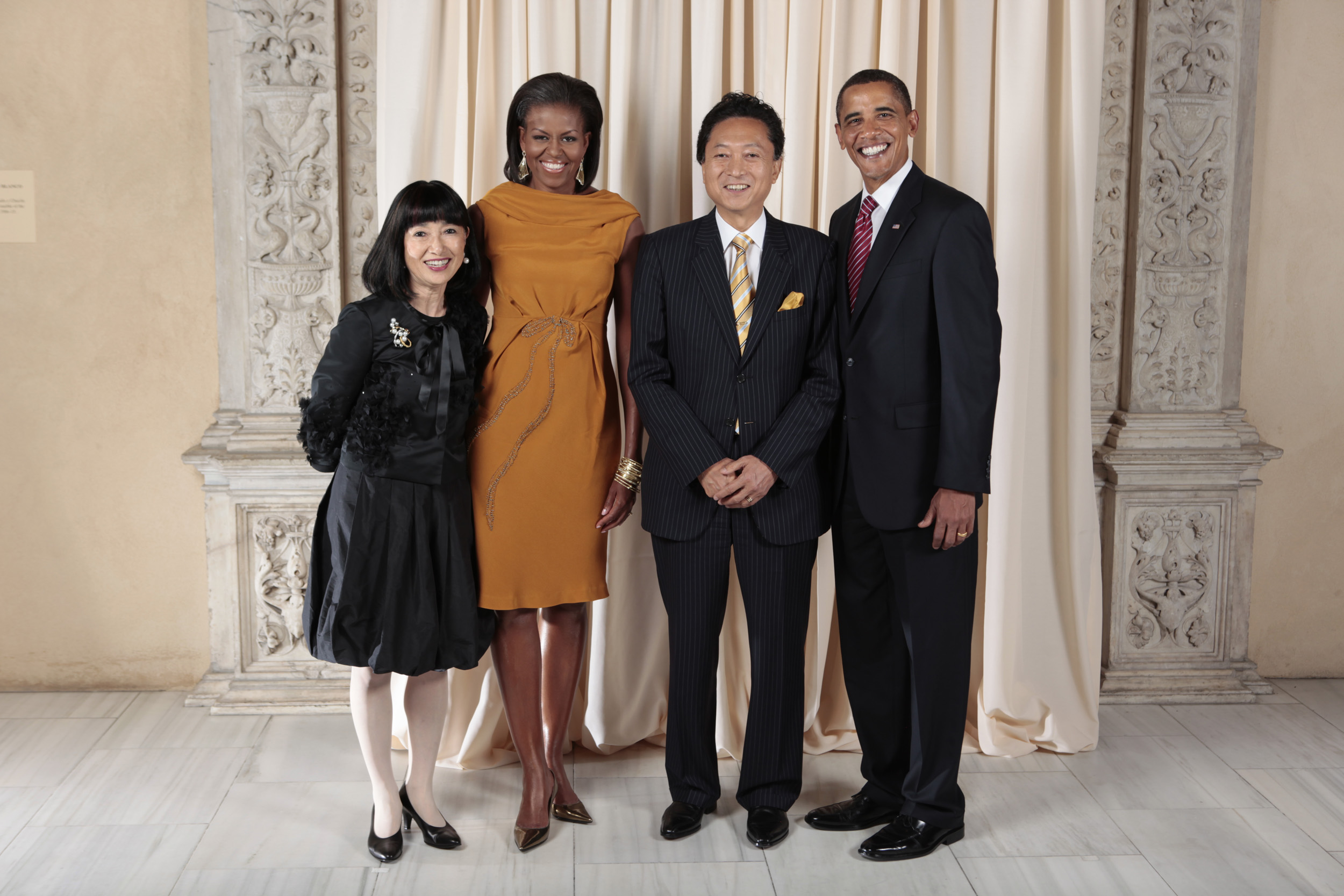

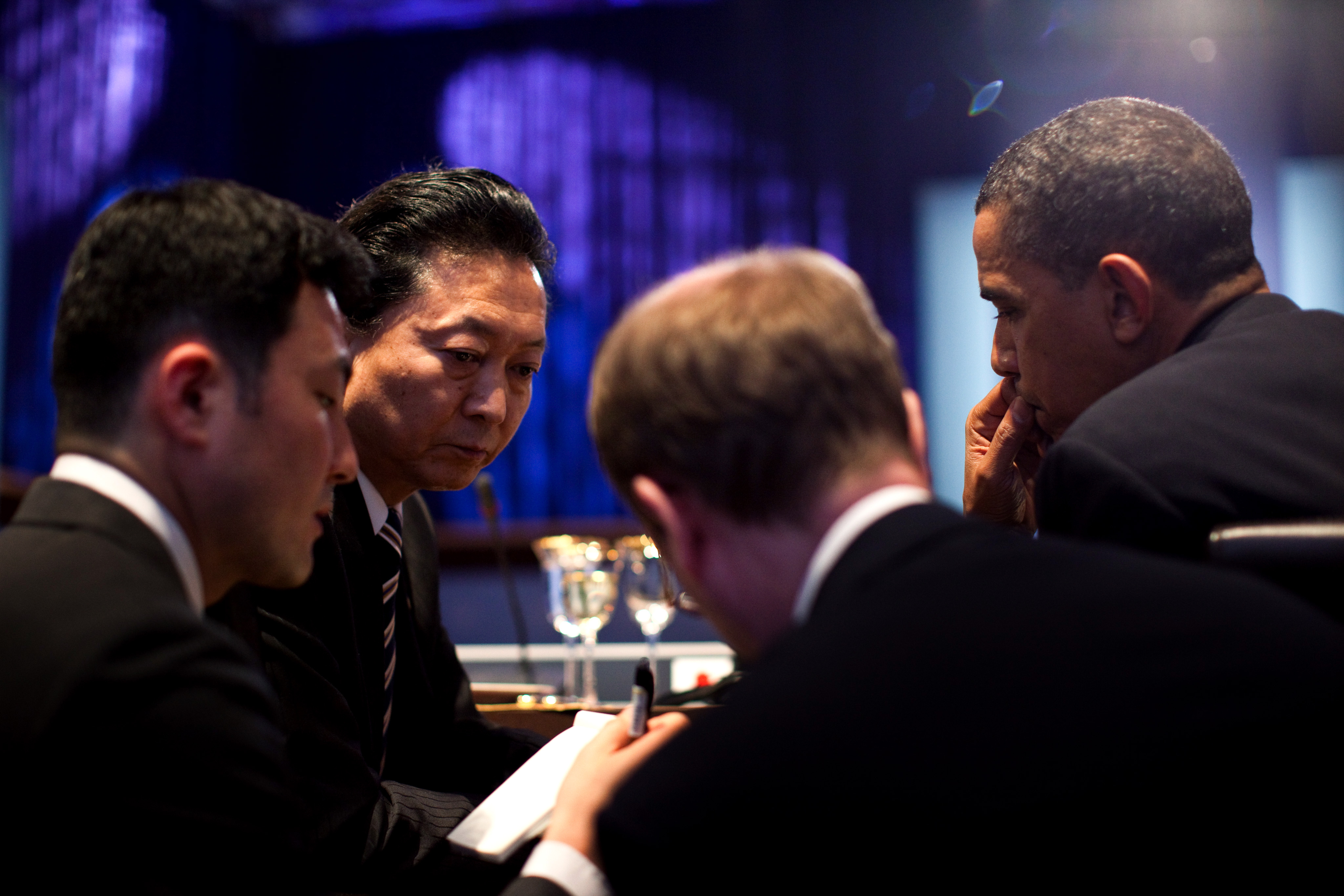

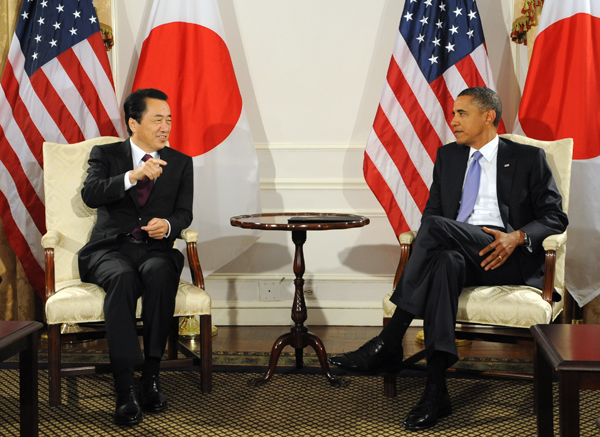

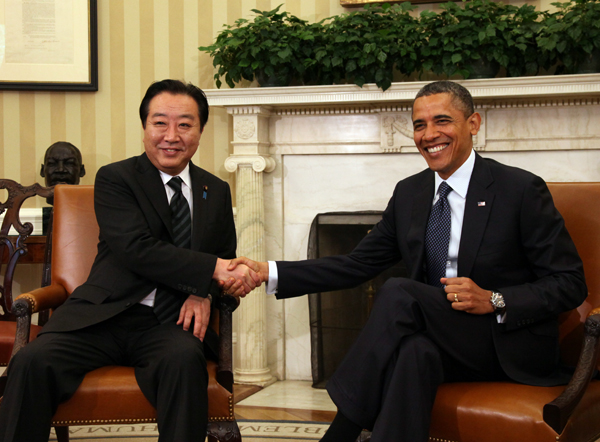

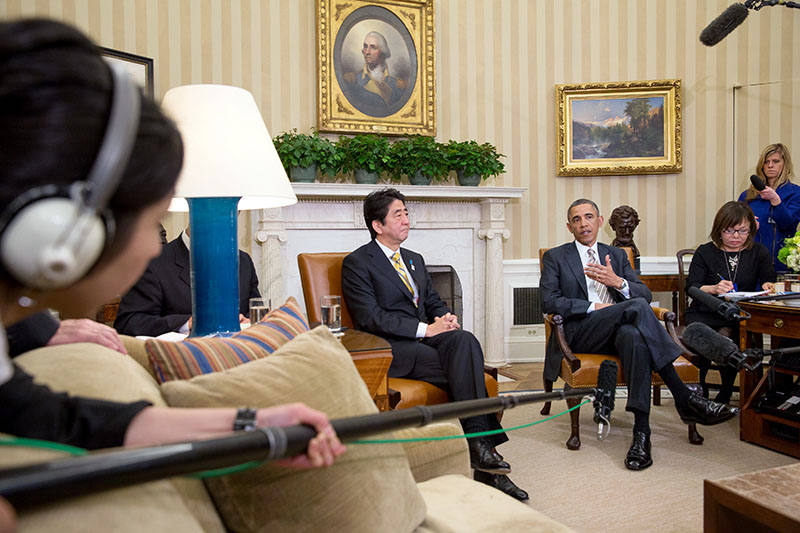

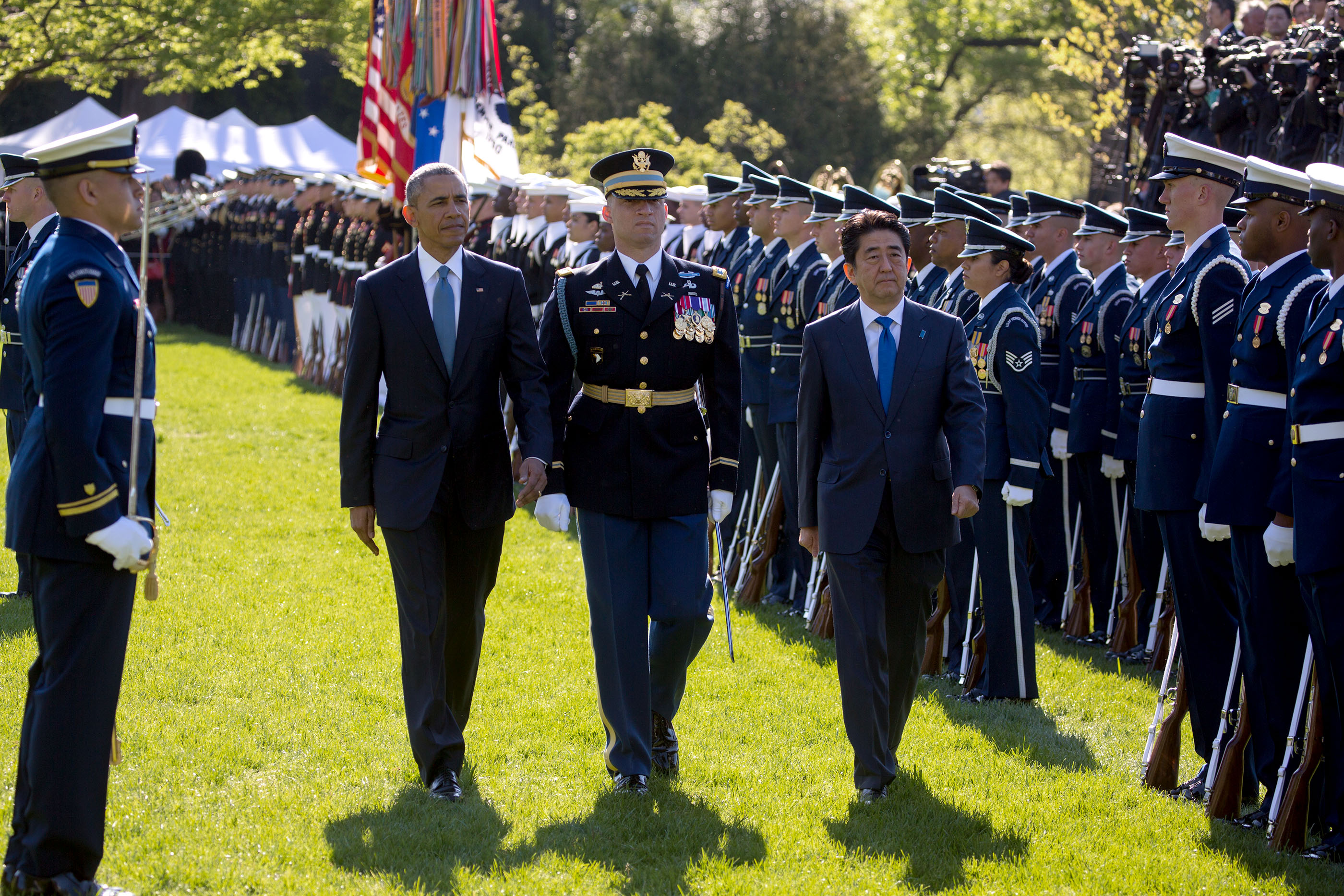

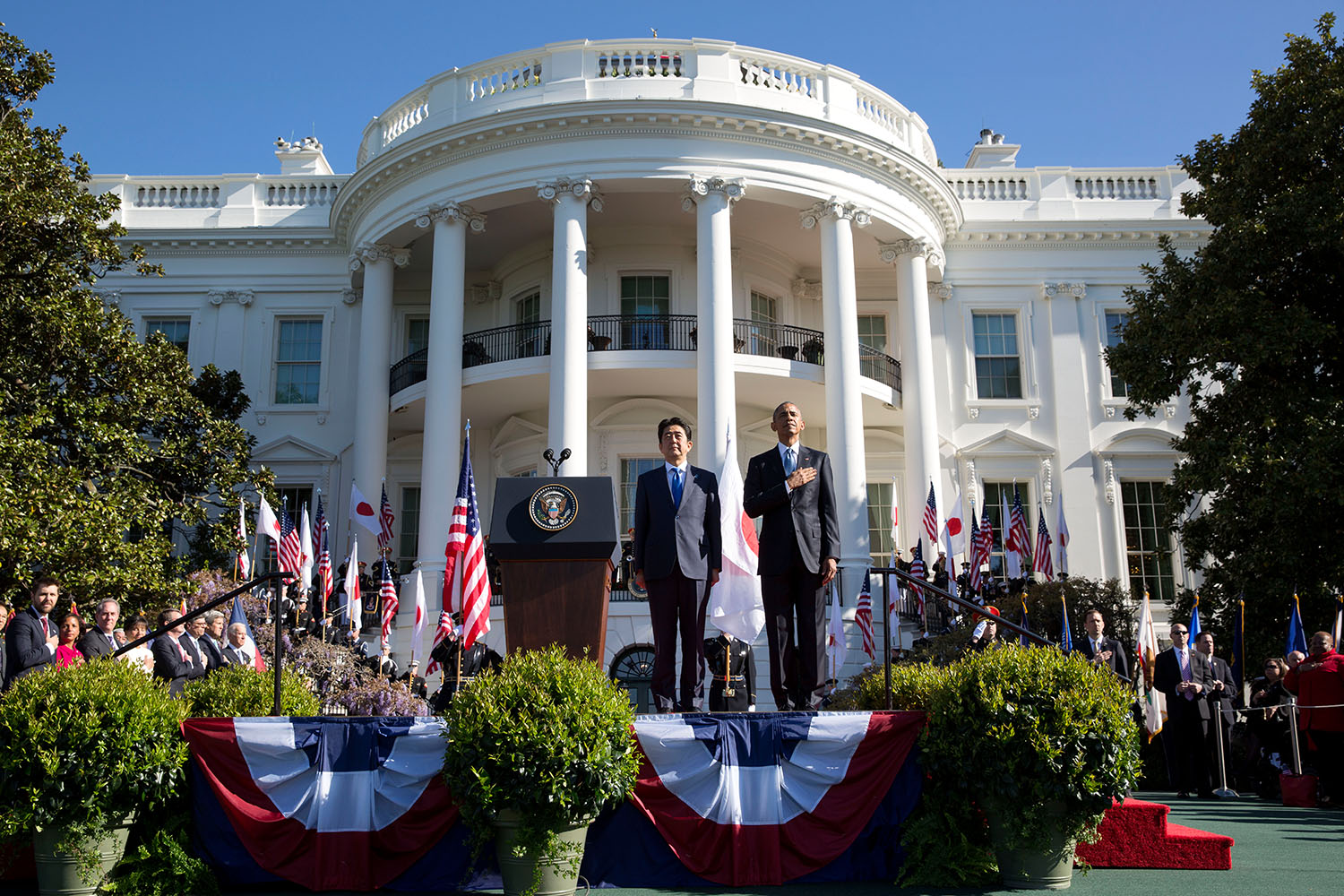

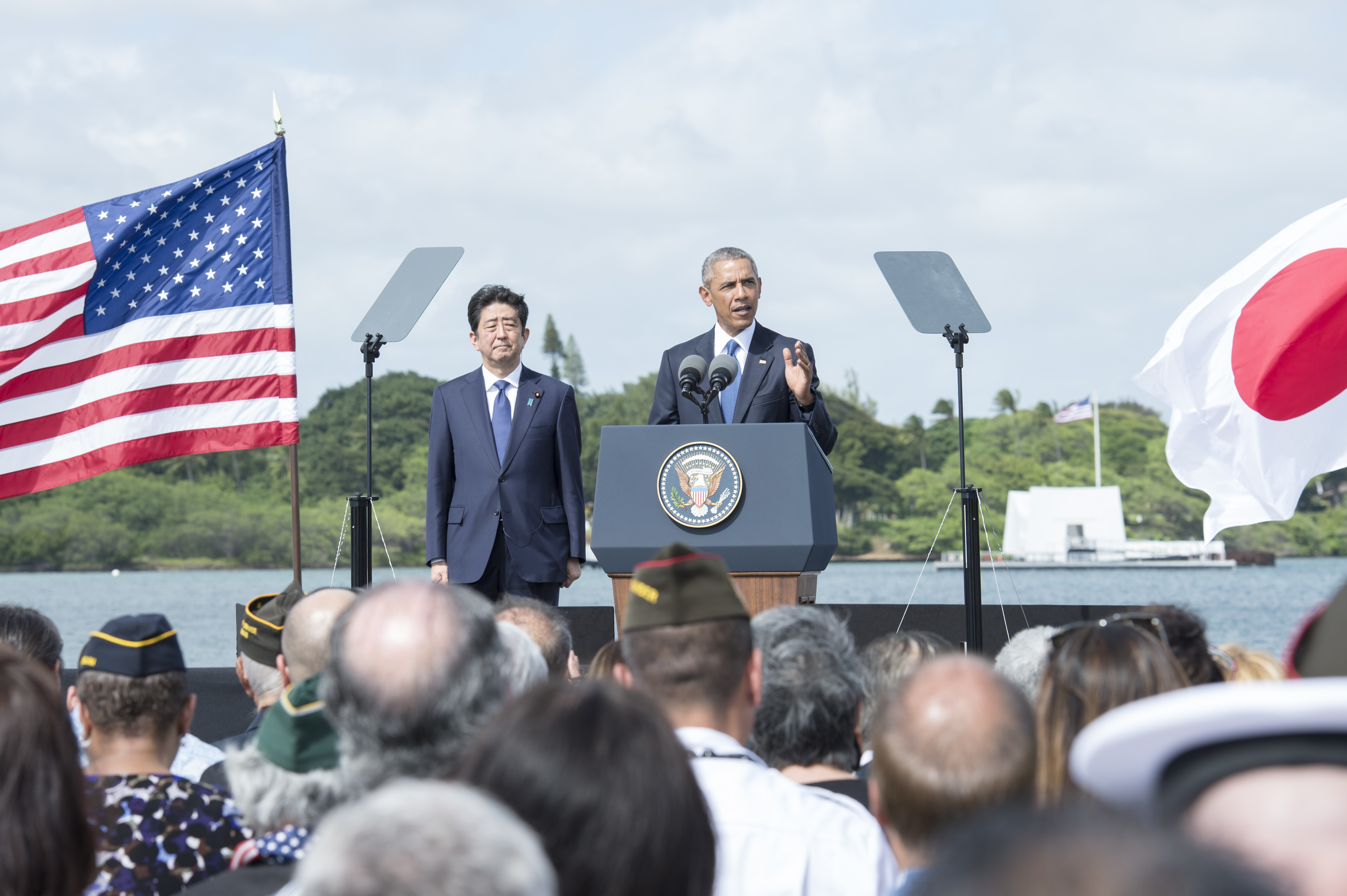

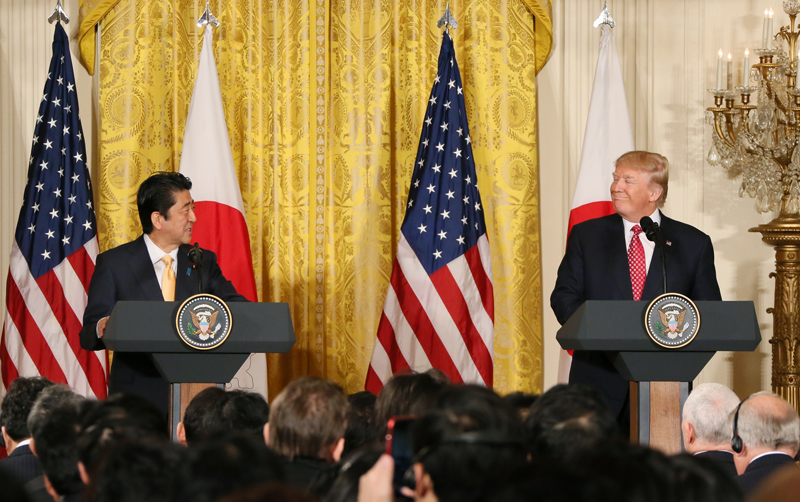

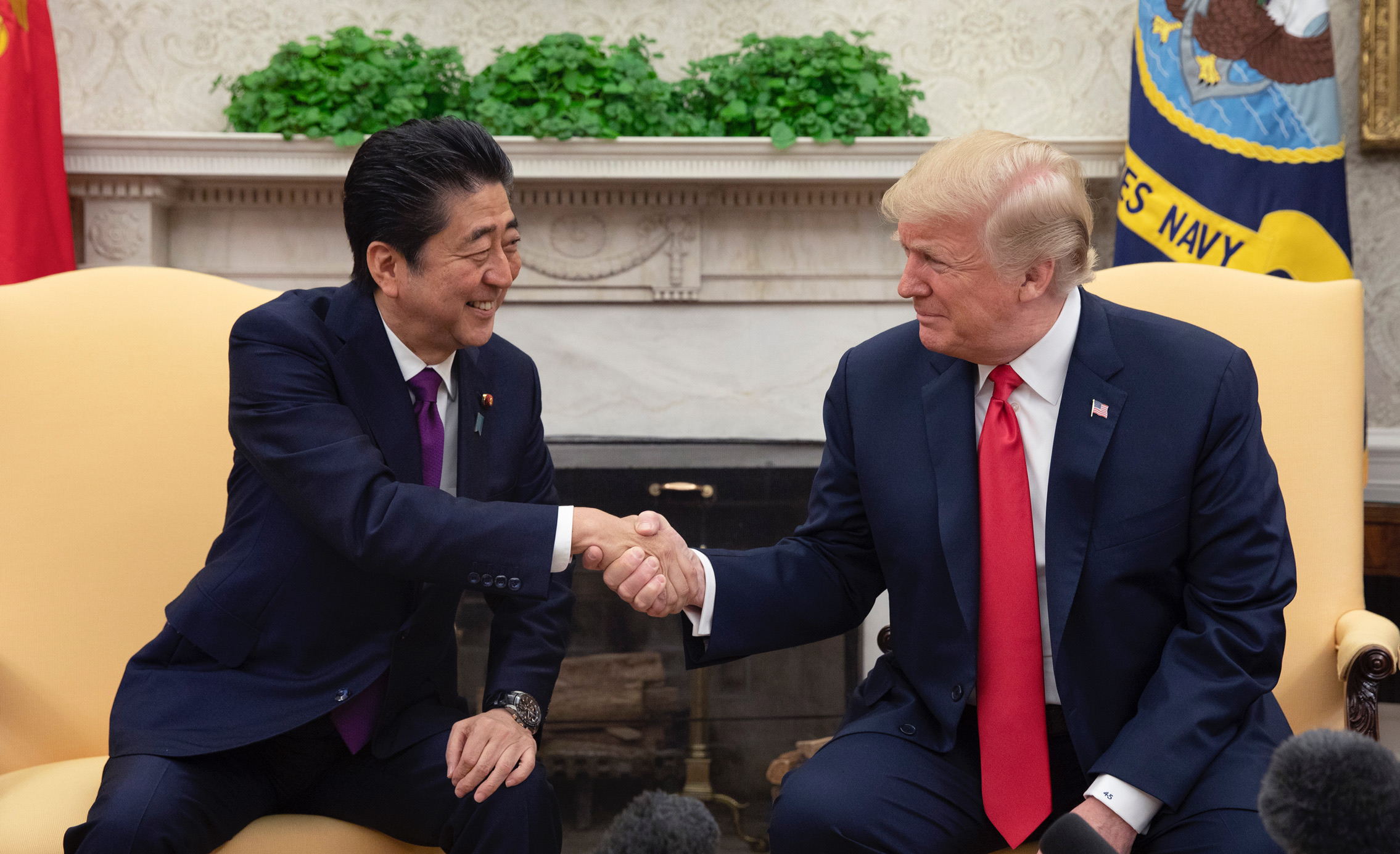

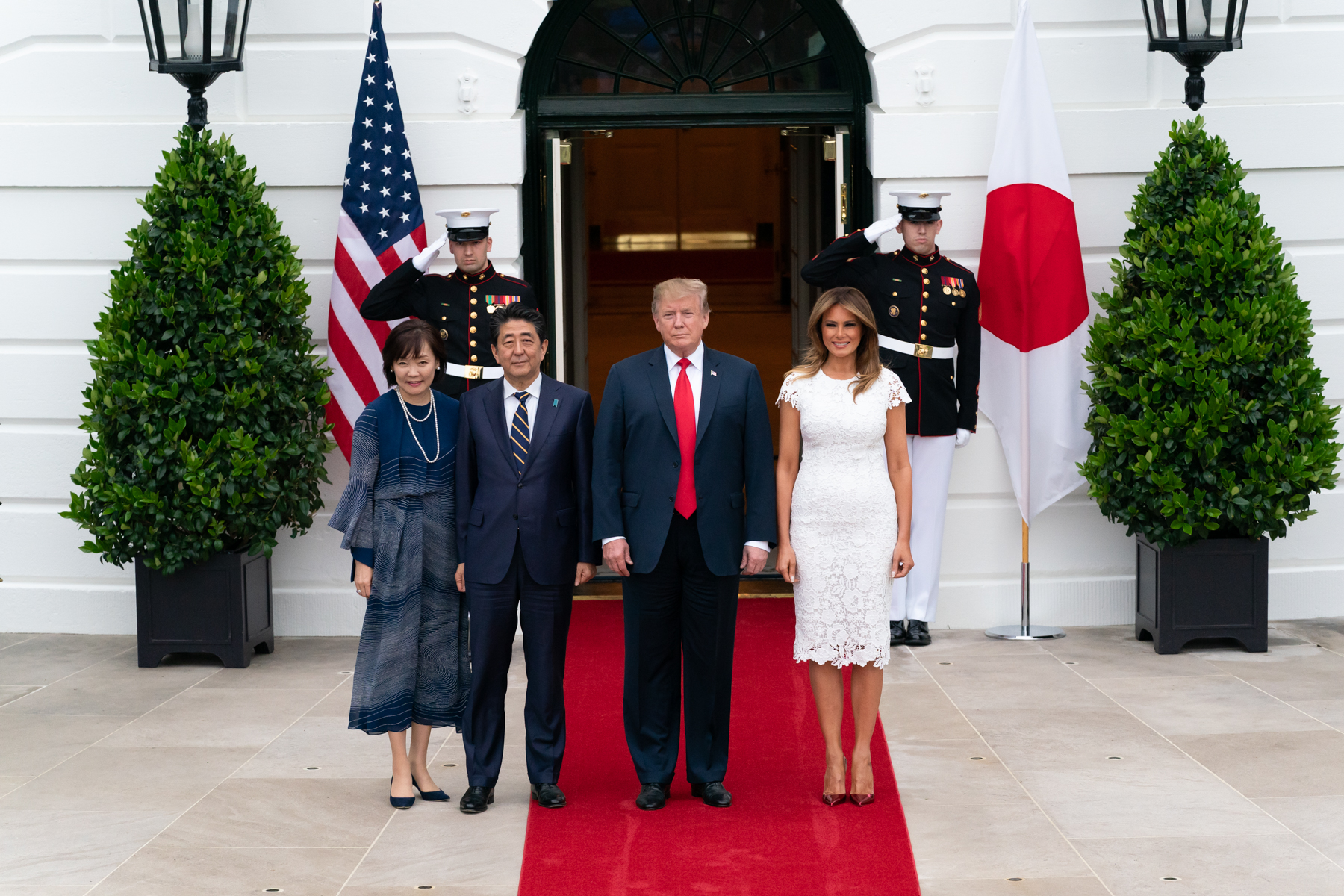

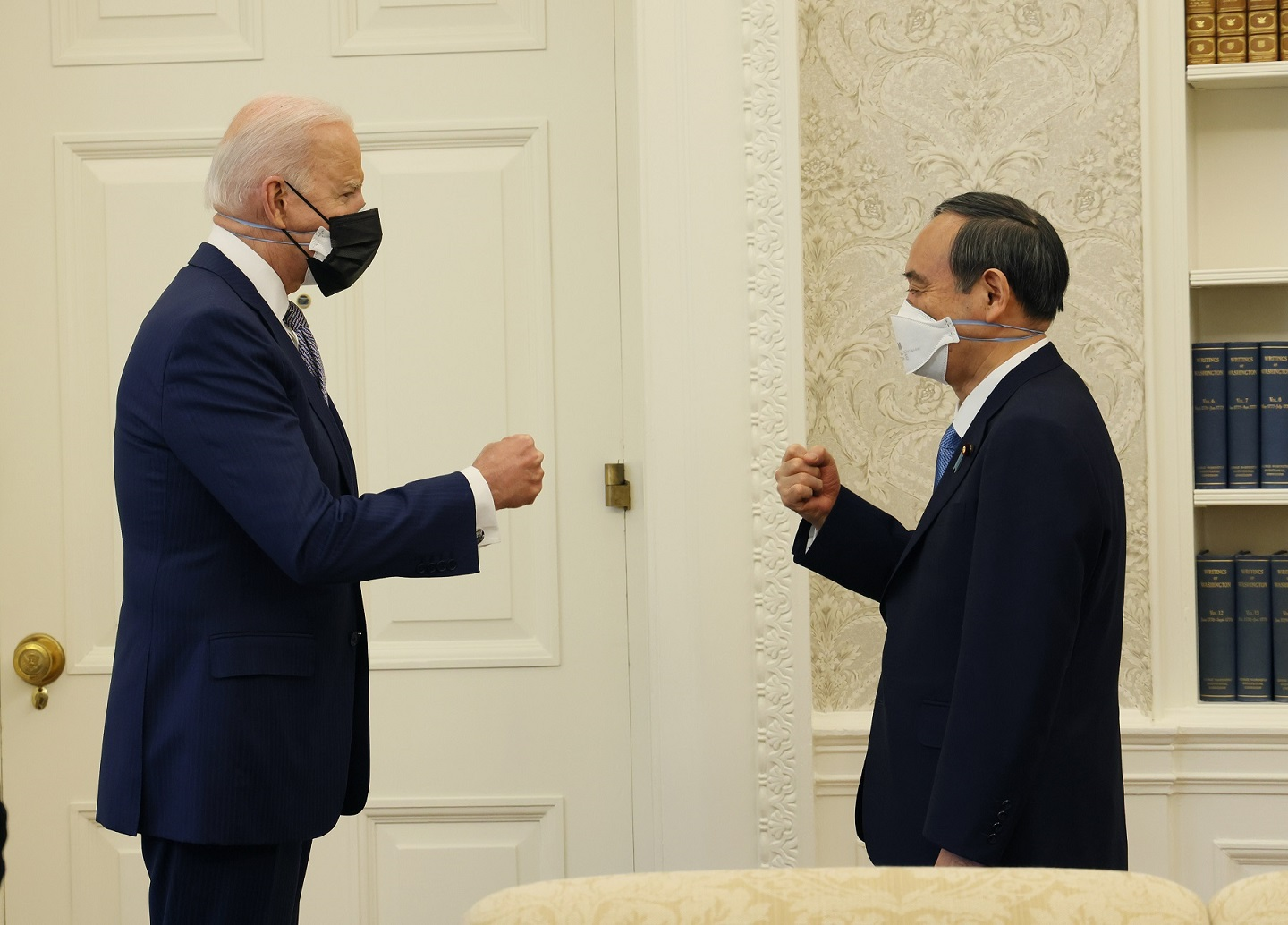

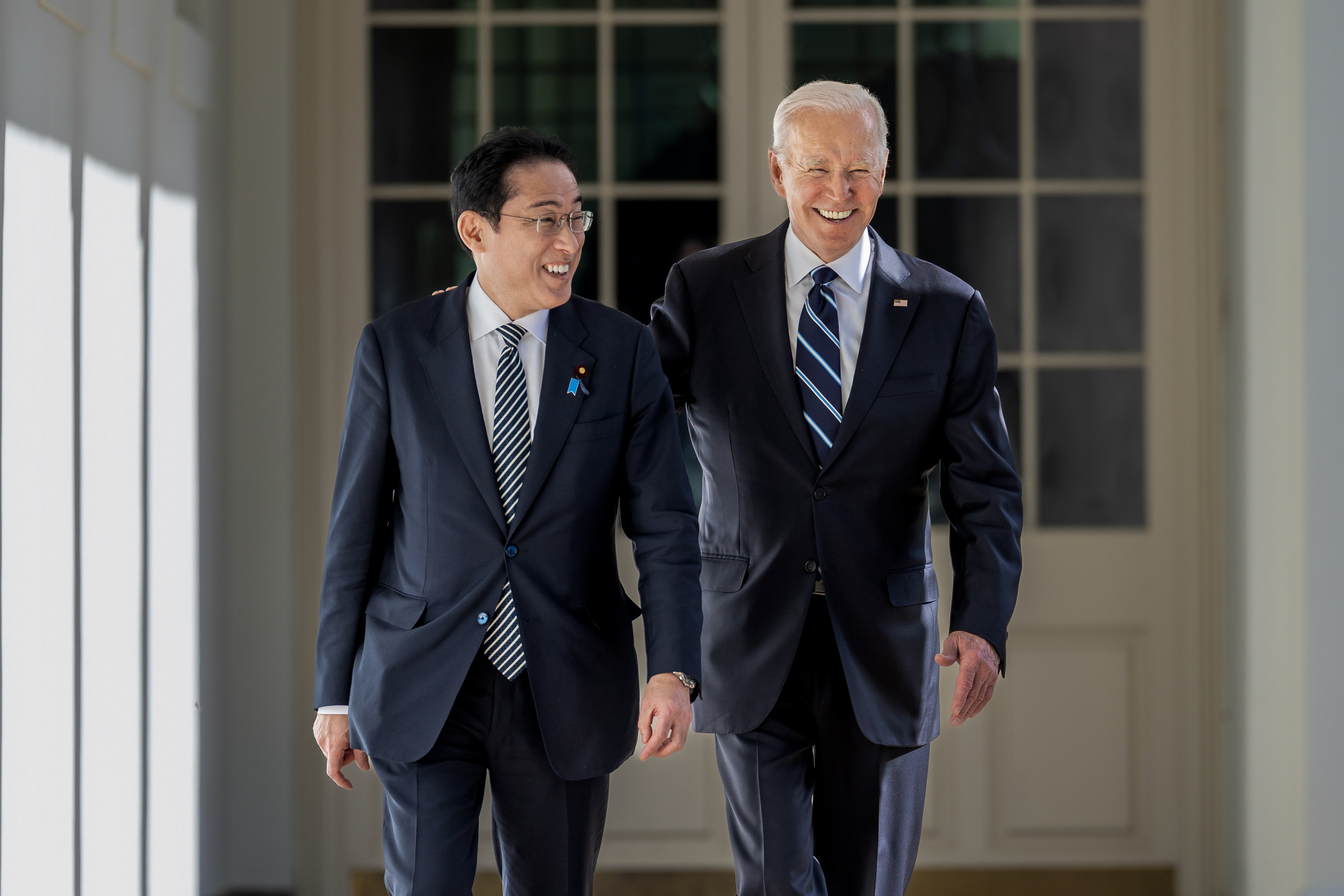

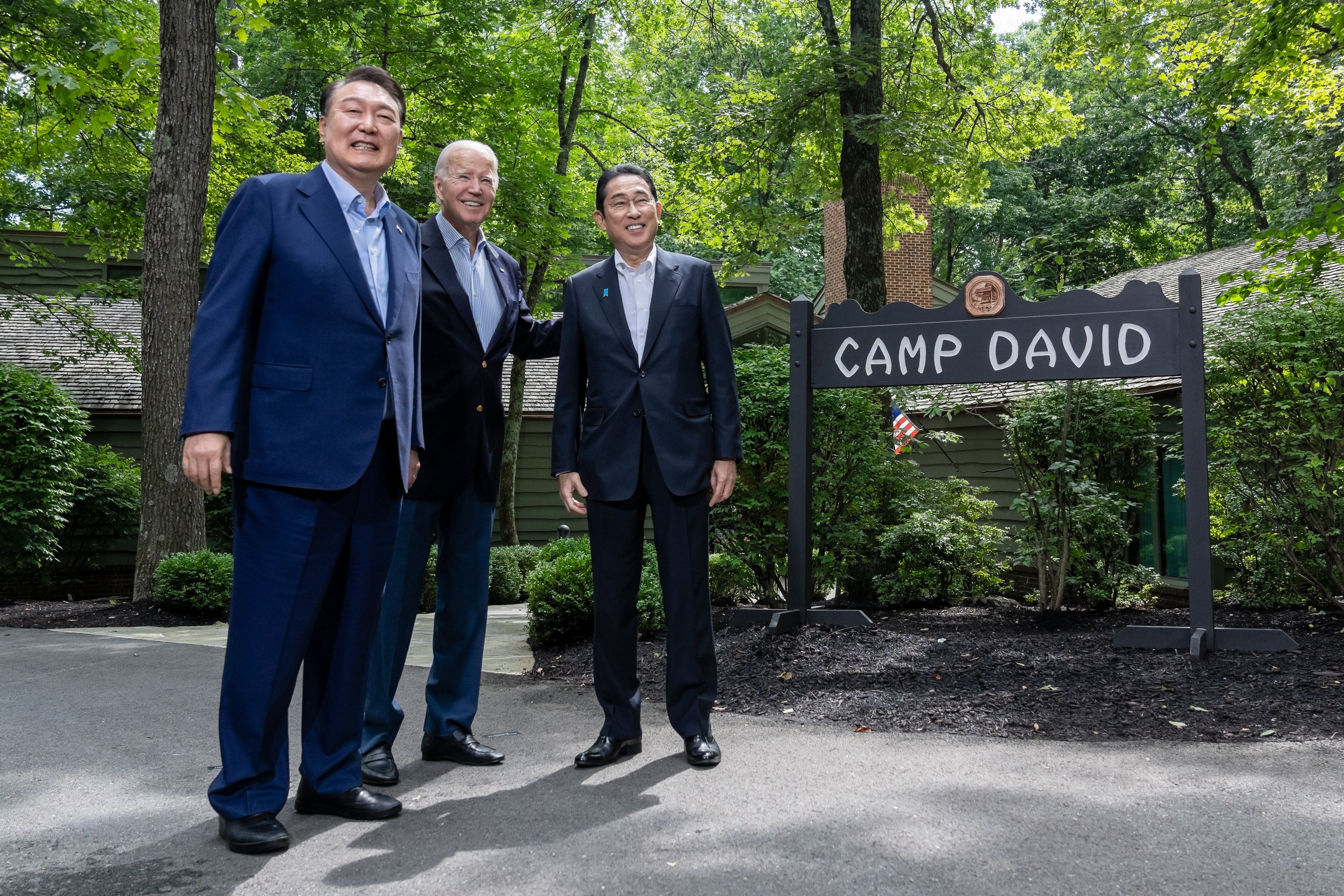

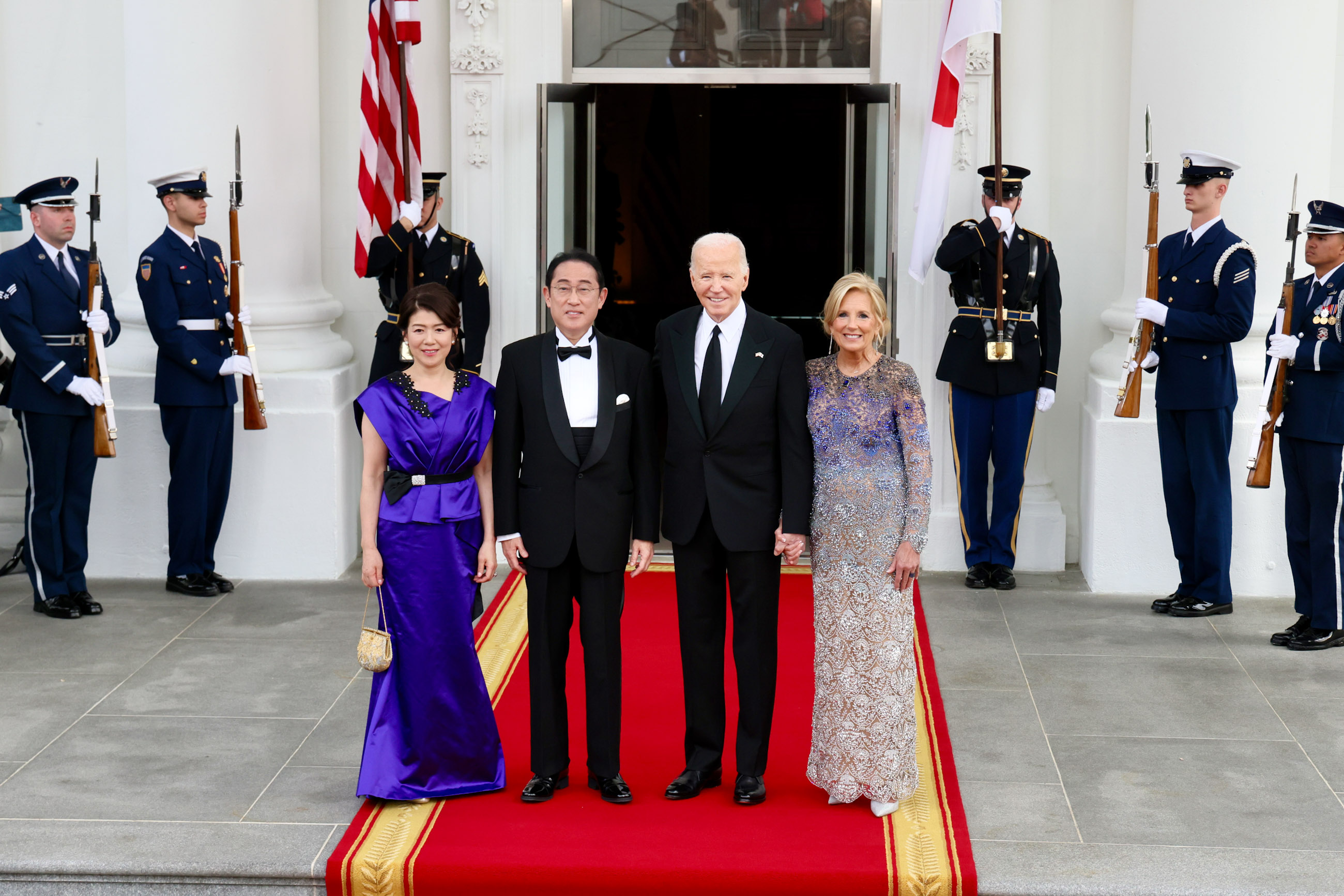

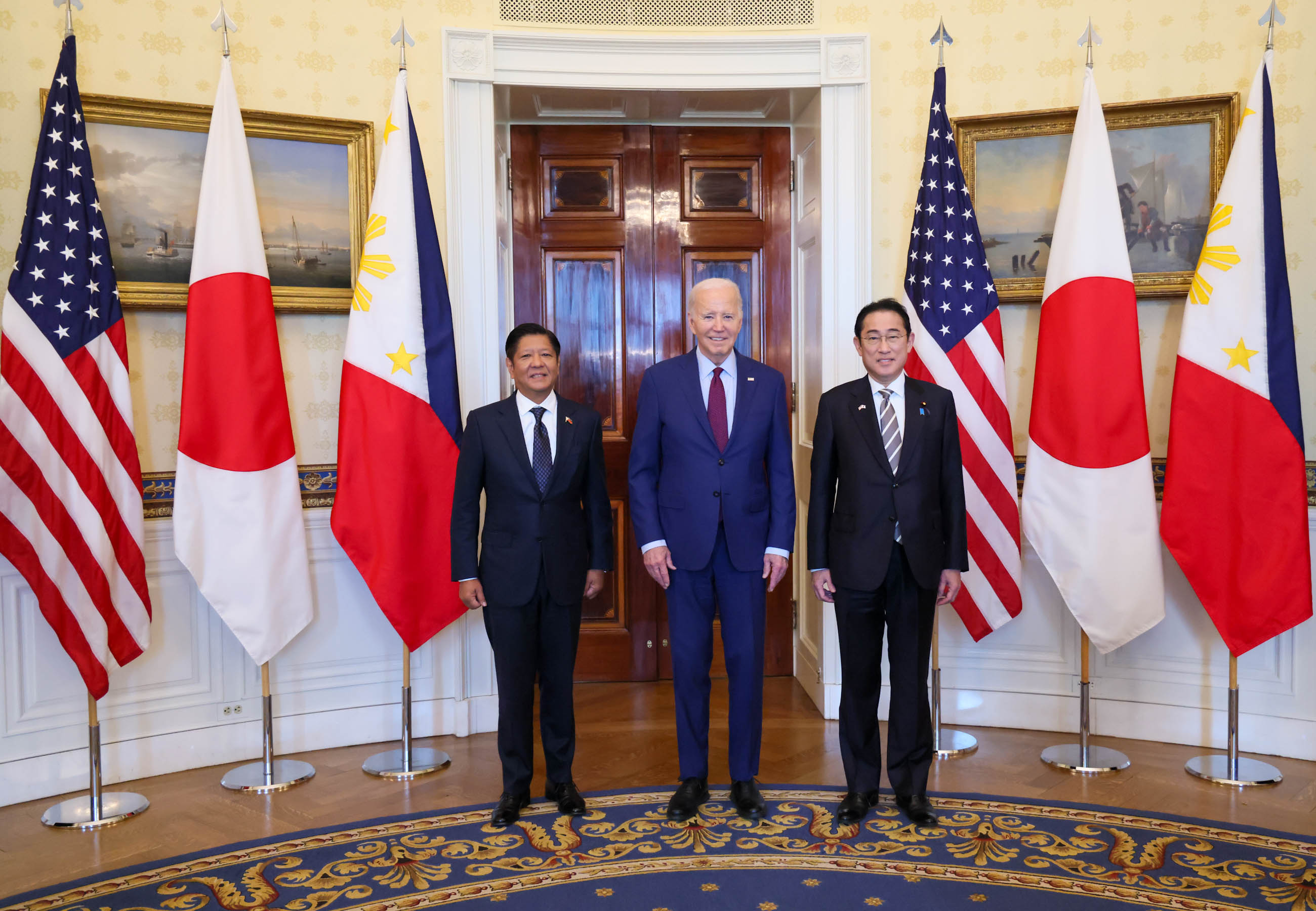

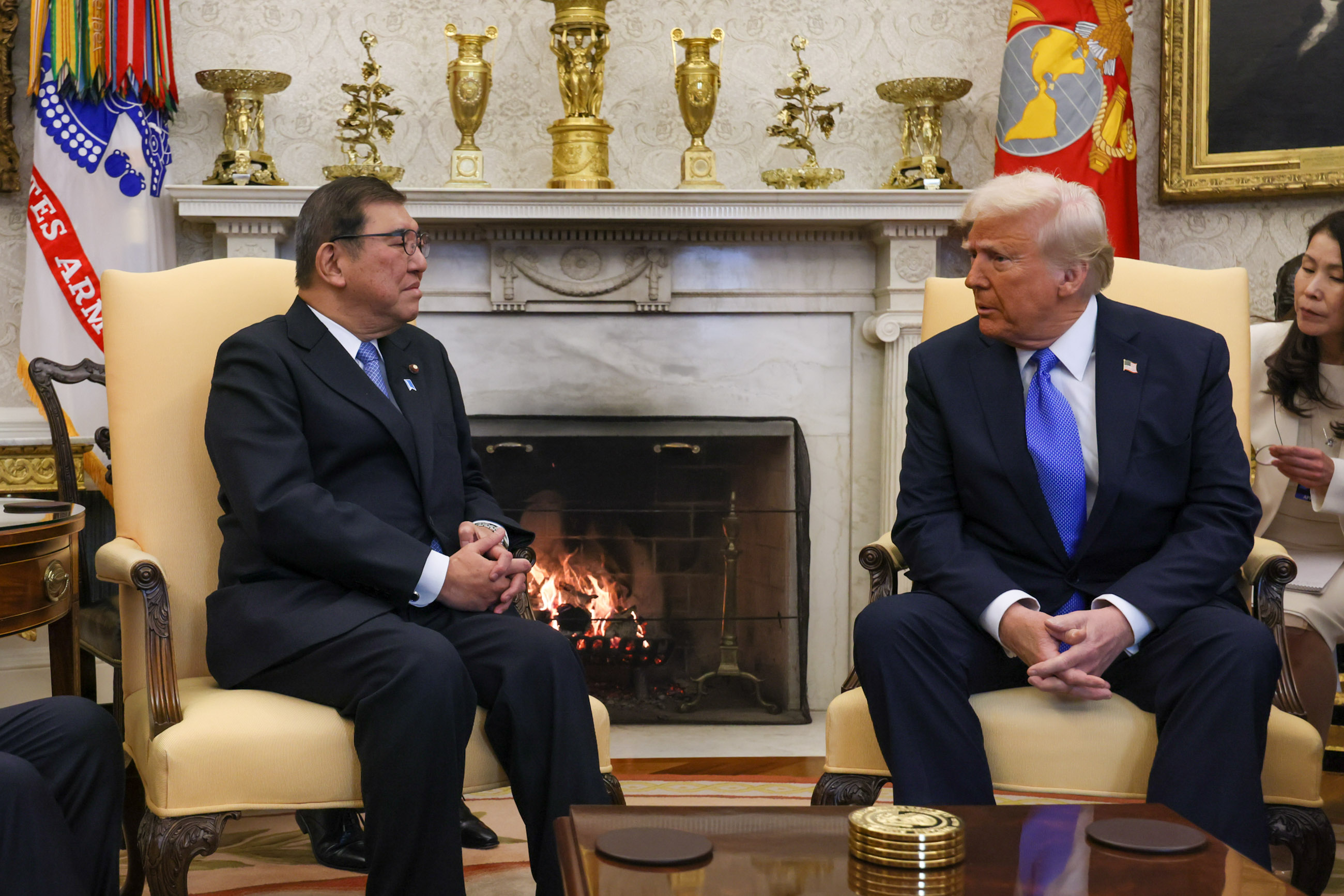

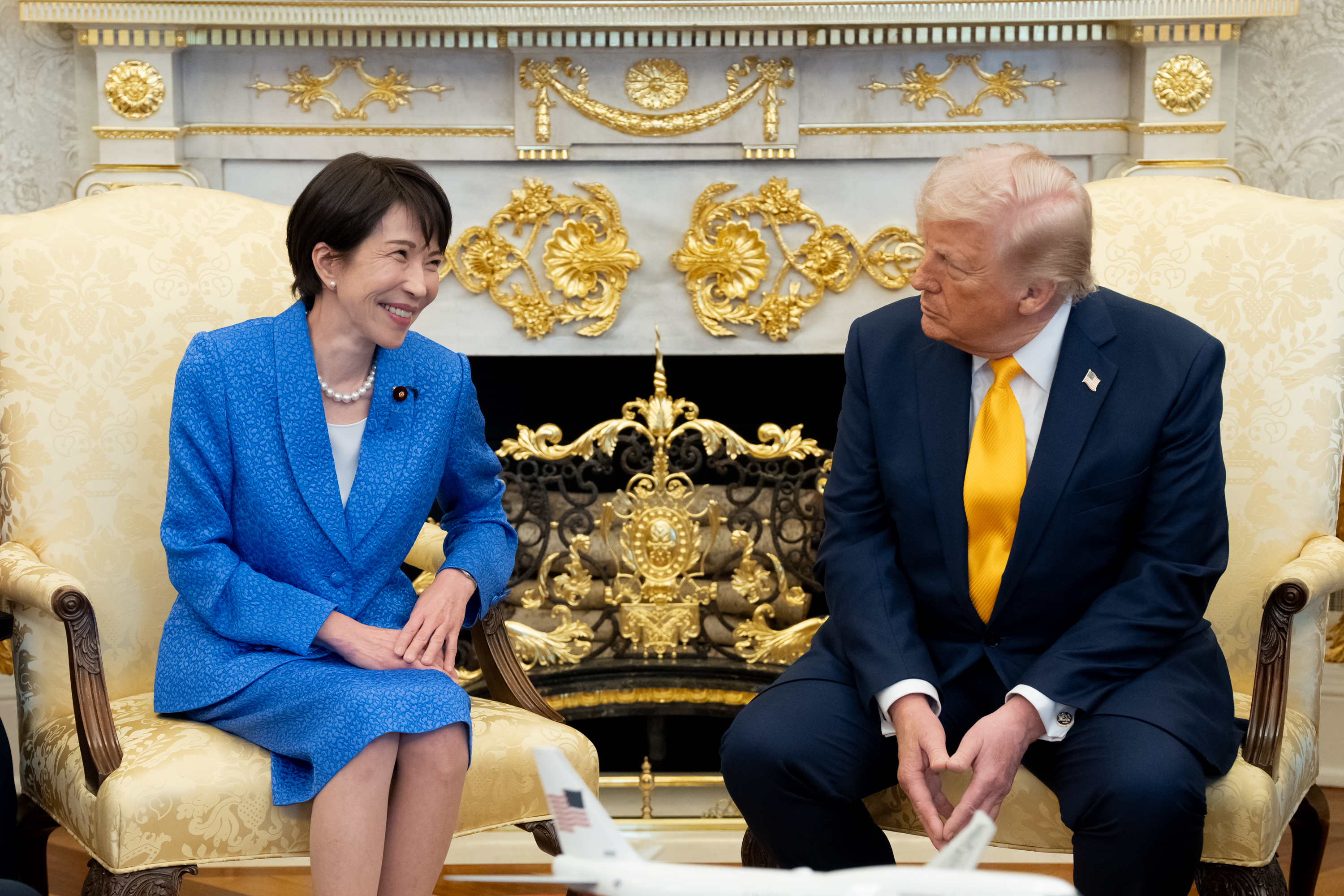

== Jordan ==
Table of Trips
Start	End	Guest	Title	Reason
March 23, 1959	March 28, 1959	Hussein	King	Informal visit.In the U.S.March 17 – April 17; visited Hawaii, San Francisco, Williamsburg and Norfolk, Knoxville and Oak Ridge, Columbus, Los Angeles, Denver and Colorado Springs, Chicago, Springfield, Detroit, and New York City.
October 7, 1960	October 7, 1960	Hussein	King	Met with President Eisenhower in Washington, D.C. while attending UN General Assembly.
April 14, 1964	April 16, 1964	Hussein	King	Official visit. In U.S.April 13–23.Also visited Philadelphia, New York City, Cape Kennedy and Palm Beach, and Houston
June 28, 1967	June 28, 1967	Hussein	King	Informal visit while attending UN General Assembly session; in U.S.June 24–30.
November 6, 1967	November 9, 1967	Hussein	King	Informal visit. In U.S.November 2–12; visited New York City and Chicago.
April 8, 1969	April 10, 1969	Hussein	King	Official visit. In U.S.April 7–18; visited Williamsburg and MacDill Air Force Base.Private visit to New York City after April 11.
December 8, 1970	December 10, 1970	Hussein	King	Private visit. Met with President Nixon December 8.
March 28, 1972	March 28, 1972	Hussein	King	Private visit.
February 5, 1973	February 7, 1973	Hussein	King	Private visit. Met with President Nixon February 6.
March 12, 1974	March 12, 1974	Hussein	King	Private visit.
August 15, 1974	August 18, 1974	Hussein	King	Private visit. First foreign head of state to be received by President Ford.
April 29, 1975	April 29, 1975	Hussein	King	Met with President Ford during a private visit.
March 29, 1976	April 1, 1976	Hussein	King	State visit. Afterwards visited Chicago.
April 24, 1977	April 27, 1977	Hussein	King	Official working visit.
June 16, 1980	June 18, 1980	Hussein	King	Official visit.
November 1, 1981	November 5, 1981	Hussein	King	State visit; visited Los Angeles.Departed U.S.November 12.
December 18, 1982	December 23, 1982	Hussein	King	Official working visit.
February 12, 1984	February 14, 1984	Hussein	King	Official working visit.
May 28, 1985	May 31, 1985	Hussein	King	Official working visit.
September 28, 1985	October 1, 1985	Hussein	King	Private Visit. Met with President Reagan September 30.
June 8, 1986	June 11, 1986	Hussein	King	Private Visit. Met with President Reagan June 10.In U.S.June 4; also visited Boston, Middlebury, Wellesley, and Cleveland.
April 17, 1989	April 21, 1989	Hussein	King	Official Visit.
July 16, 1990	July 16, 1990	Hussein	King	Met with President Bush at Kennebunkport.Arrived in Washington, D.C. August 15.
March 12, 1992	March 13, 1992	Hussein	King	Met with President Bush during a private visit.
June 16, 1993	June 25, 1993	Hussein	King	Private visit. Afterwards received medical treatment in Rochester.Departed the U.S.June 27.
January 19, 1994	January 26, 1994	Hussein	King	Met with President Clinton during a private visit.
June 17, 1994	June 23, 1994	Hussein	King	Met with President Clinton during a private visit. Attended first meeting of the U.S.-Jordan Bilateral Commission June 22.
July 22, 1994	July 29, 1994	Hussein	King	Signed the Israel–Jordan peace treaty and addressed a Joint session of the United States Congress.
March 26, 1995	April 2, 1995	Hussein	King	Met with President Clinton during a private visit. Arrived in the U.S.March 24; also visited Los Angeles, Rochester, and New York City.Departed the U.S.April 7.
September 28, 1995	September 30, 1995	Hussein	King	Attended signing of Israeli-Palestinian Interim Agreement
June 6, 1996	June 30, 1996	Hussein	King	Met with President Clinton during a private visit. At Mayo Clinic Mar.4-6.
June 8, 1996	June 14, 1996	Hussein	King	Met with President Clinton during a private visit.
September 30, 1996	October 2, 1996	Hussein	King	Attended Middle East Summit Meeting.
March 30, 1997	April 2, 1997	Hussein	King	Met with President Clinton during a private visit. Arrived in U.S.March 21 for medical treatment at the Mayo Clinic.Also visited New York City.
November 11, 1997	November 14, 1997	Hussein	King	Met with President Clinton during a private visit.
March 16, 1998	March 20, 1998	Hussein	King	Private visit. Arrived in the U.S.March 12.
June 15, 1998	June 16, 1998	Hussein	King	Met with President Clinton during a private visit.
October 20, 1998	October 23, 1998	Hussein	King	Took part in Israeli-Palestinian peace talks at Wye Plantation
January 5, 1999	January 5, 1999	Hussein	King	Met with President Clinton during a private visit. Had earlier received medical treatment at the Mayo Clinic. Arrived in the U.S.July 14, 1998.
May 17, 1999	May 19, 1999	Abdullah II	King	Working visit. Also visited New York City. Departed the U.S. on May 24.
October 7, 1999	October 14, 1999	Abdullah II	King	Met with President Clinton on October 12 during a private visit. Also visited Boston.
June 5, 2000	June 8, 2000	Abdullah II	King	Working visit. Discussed the Middle East peace process with President Bill Clinton. Arrived in the U.S. on May 30.
September 6, 2000	September 6, 2000	Abdullah II	King	Met with President Clinton at the UN Millennium Summit in New York City.
October 24, 2000	October 24, 2000	Abdullah II	King	Working visit.
April 3, 2001	April 11, 2001	Abdullah II	King	Working visit.
September 28, 2001	September 26, 2001	Abdullah II	King	Working visit.
January 30, 2002	February 1, 2002	Abdullah II	King	Met with President Bush February 1 during a private visit.
February 1, 2002	February 1, 2002	Abdullah II	King	Working visit
May 3, 2002	May 13, 2002	Abdullah II	King	Working visit
July 19, 2002	August 1, 2002	Abdullah II	King	Working visit
September 15, 2003	September 19, 2003	Abdullah II	King	Met with President Bush at Camp David Sept.18-19.
December 3, 2003	December 7, 2003	Abdullah II	King	Working visit.
May 5, 2004	May 7, 2004	Abdullah II	King	Working visit.
June 8, 2004	June 16, 2004	Abdullah II	King	Working visit. Met with President Bush at the G-8 Economic Summit in Sea Island. Attended the funeral of Former President Reagan.
59.Dec.2004	December 9, 2004	Abdullah II	King	Working visit
March 15, 2005	March 15, 2005	Abdullah II	King	Working visit
September 19, 2005	September 22, 2005	Abdullah II	King	Working visit
February 4, 2006	February 8, 2006	Abdullah II	King	Working visit.Arrived in the U.S.February 1.Also visited New Orleans.
May 29, 2006	May 29, 2006	Abdullah II	King	Working visit. Arrived in the U.S.May 27; also visited Deerfield, and Jackson,
March 3, 2007	March 7, 2007	Abdullah II	King	Working visit. Addressed a Joint session of Congress March 7.
July 23, 2007	July 24, 2007	Abdullah II	King	Working visit.
March 2, 2008	March 6, 2008	Abdullah II	King	Working visit.
April 22, 2008	April 23, 2008	Abdullah II	King	Working visit.
April 21, 2009	April 21, 2009	Abdullah II	King	Working visit.
April 12, 2010	April 13, 2010	Abdullah II	King	Attended the Nuclear Security Summit.
September 1, 2010	September 1, 2010	Abdullah II	King	Attended Middle East peace talks.
May 17, 2011	May 17, 2011	Abdullah II	King	Working visit
January 17, 2012	January 18, 2012	Abdullah II	King	Working visit
April 24, 2013	April 26, 2013	Abdullah II	King	Working visit
February 12, 2014	February 14, 2014	Abdullah II	King	Included working visit at Rancho Mirage, California on February 14.
September 23, 2014	September 23, 2014	Abdullah II	King	Met with President Obama at the UN General Assembly in New York City.
December 5, 2014	December 5, 2014	Abdullah II	King	Working visit
February 3, 2015	February 3, 2015	Abdullah II	King	Working visit
January 16, 2016	January 16, 2016	Abdullah II	King	Met with President Obama at Andrews Air Force Base.
February 24, 2016	February 24, 2016	Abdullah II	King	Official working visit
March 31, 2016	April 1, 2016	Abdullah II	King	Attended the Nuclear Security Summit.
February 2, 2017	February 2, 2017	Abdullah II	King	Official Working Visit.
April 4, 2017	April 6, 2017	Abdullah II	King	Official Working Visit.
June 21, 2018	June 27, 2018	Abdullah II	King	Working Visit.
December 5, 2018	December 5, 2018	Abdullah II	King	Attended the funeral of Former President Bush.
July 19, 2021	July 19, 2021	Abdullah II	King	Working Visit.
May 13, 2022	May 13, 2022	Abdullah II	King	Working Visit.
February 2, 2023	February 2, 2023	Abdullah II	King	Private Visit (Lunch).
February 2, 2023	February 2, 2023	Hussein	Crown Prince	Private Visit (Lunch).
February 12, 2024	February 12, 2024	Abdullah II	King	Working Visit.
May 6, 2024	May 6, 2024	Abdullah II	King	Private Visit.
February 10, 2025	February 12, 2025	Abdullah II	King	Working Visit.

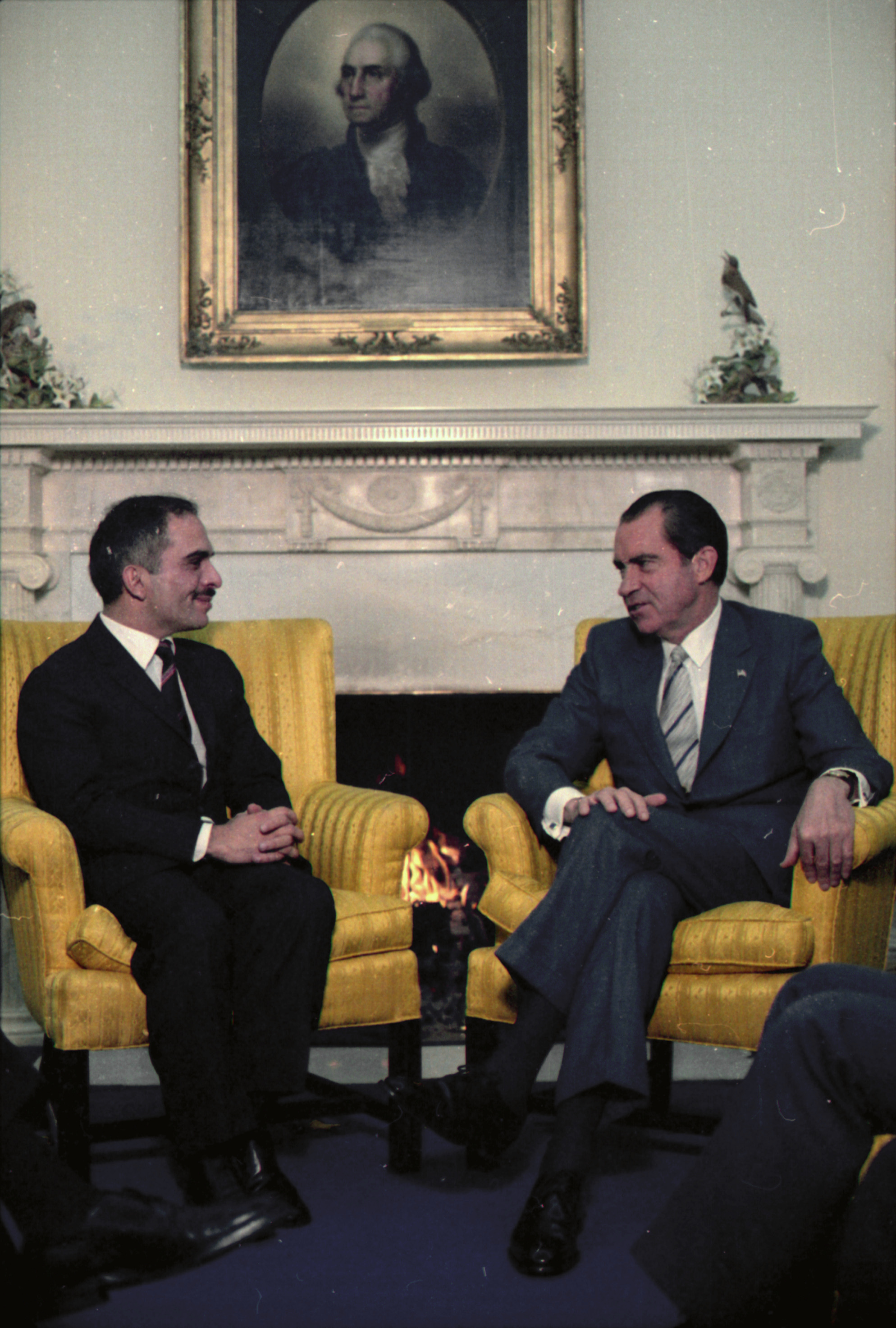

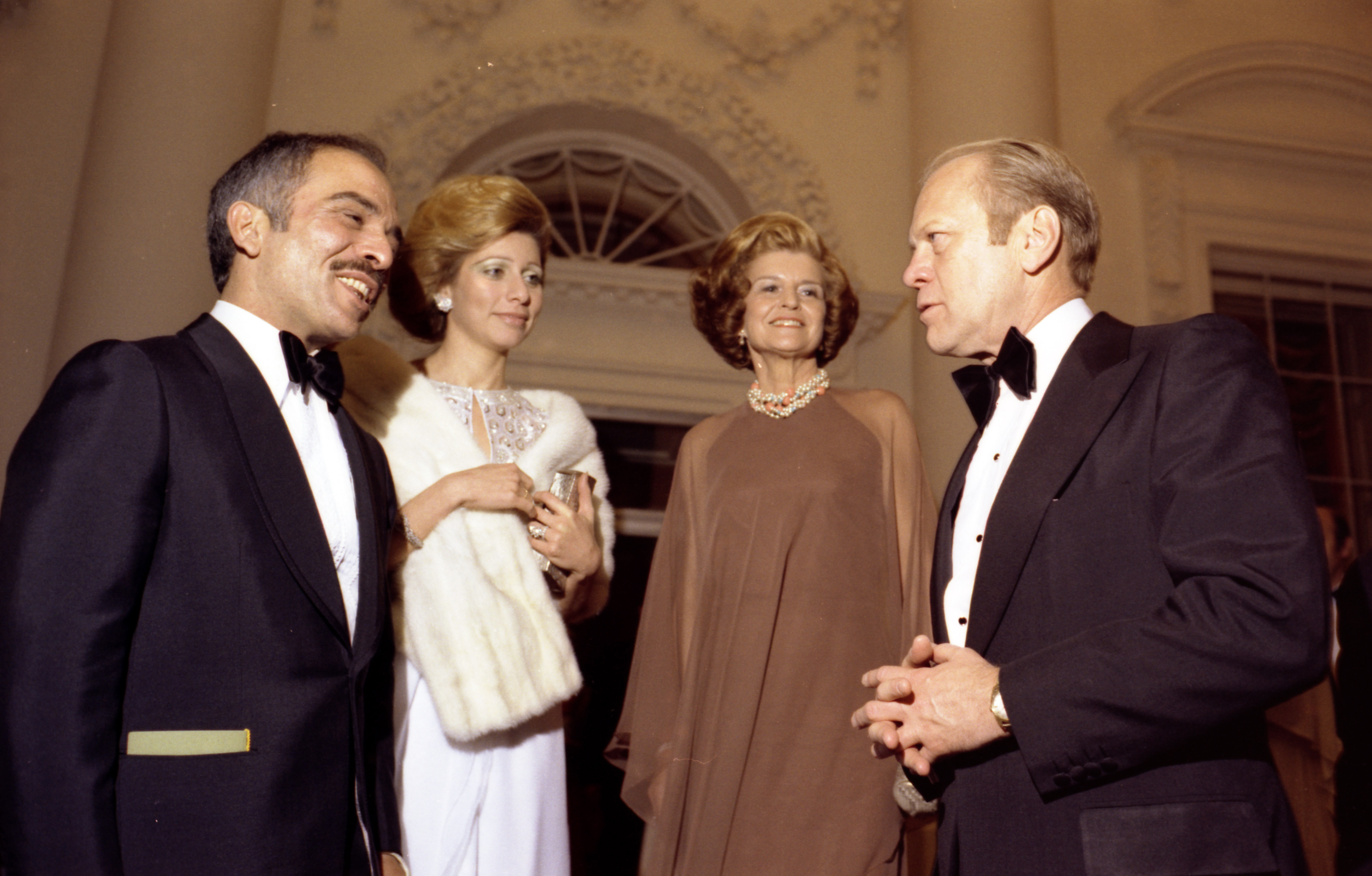

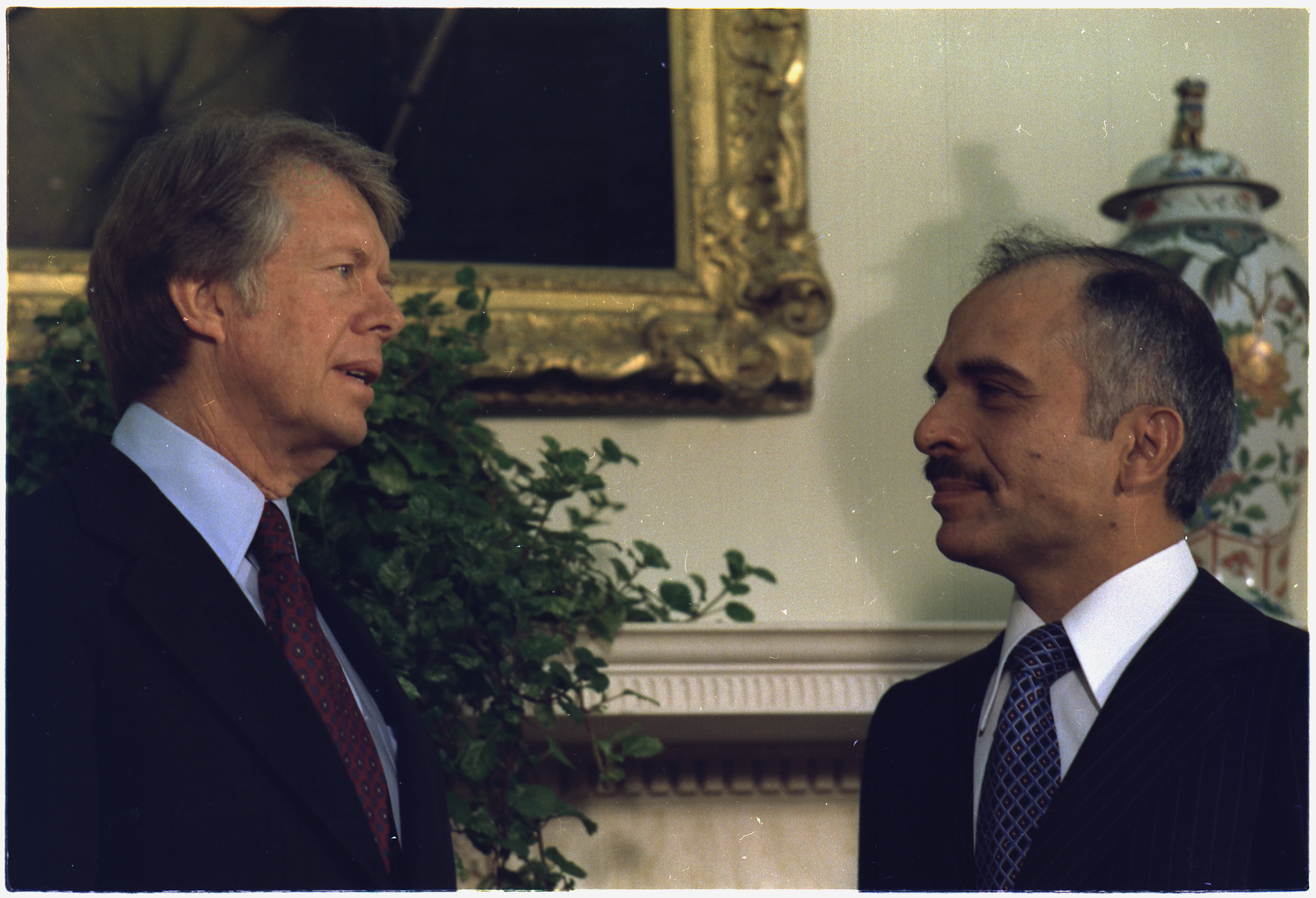

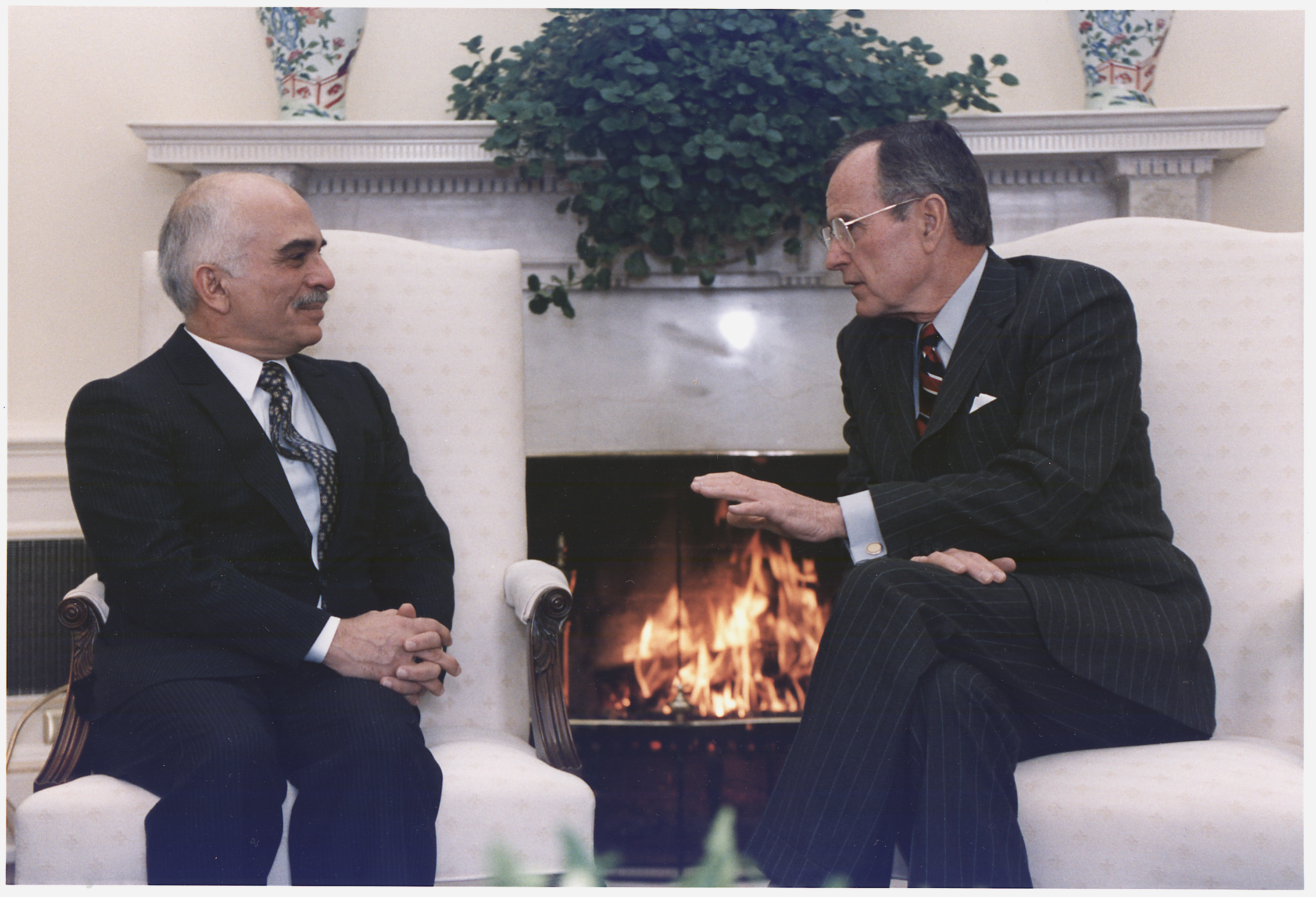

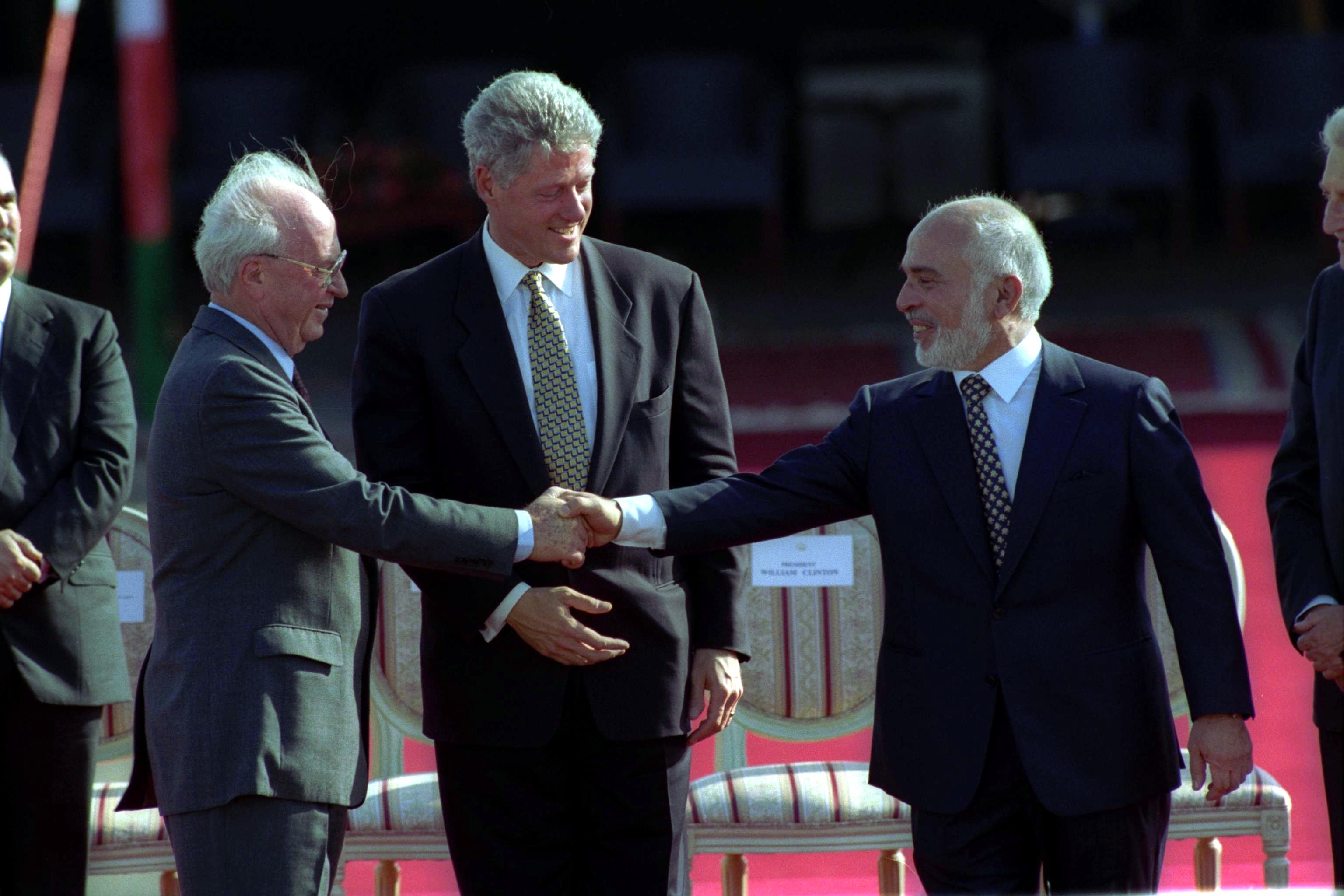

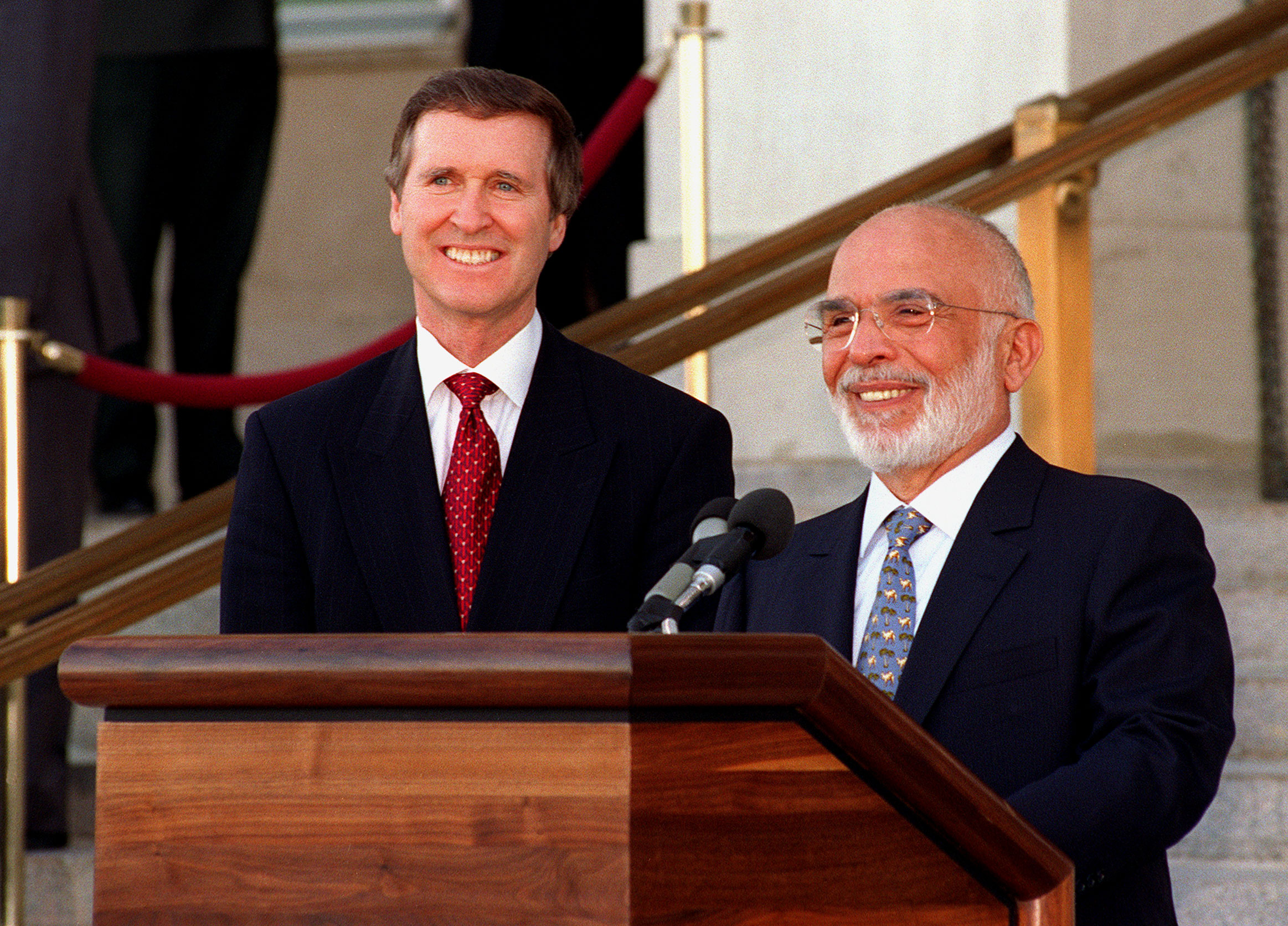

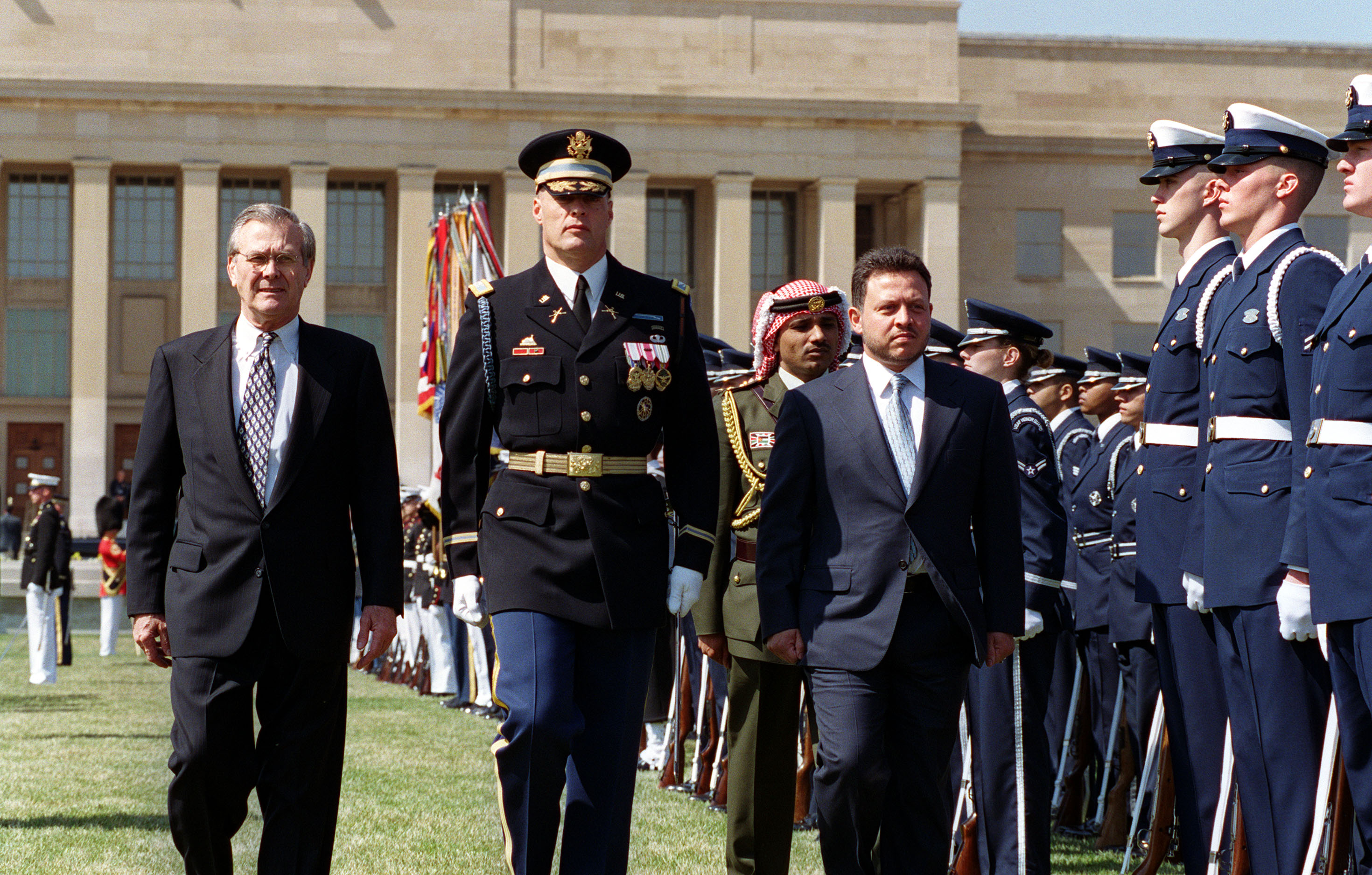

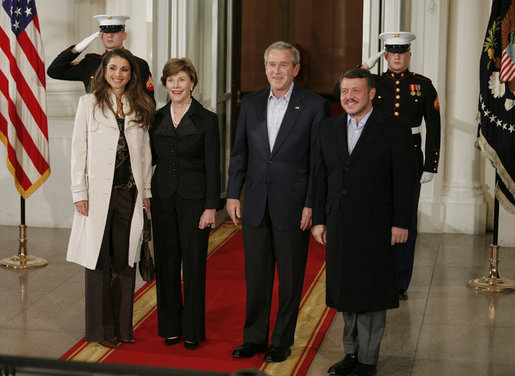

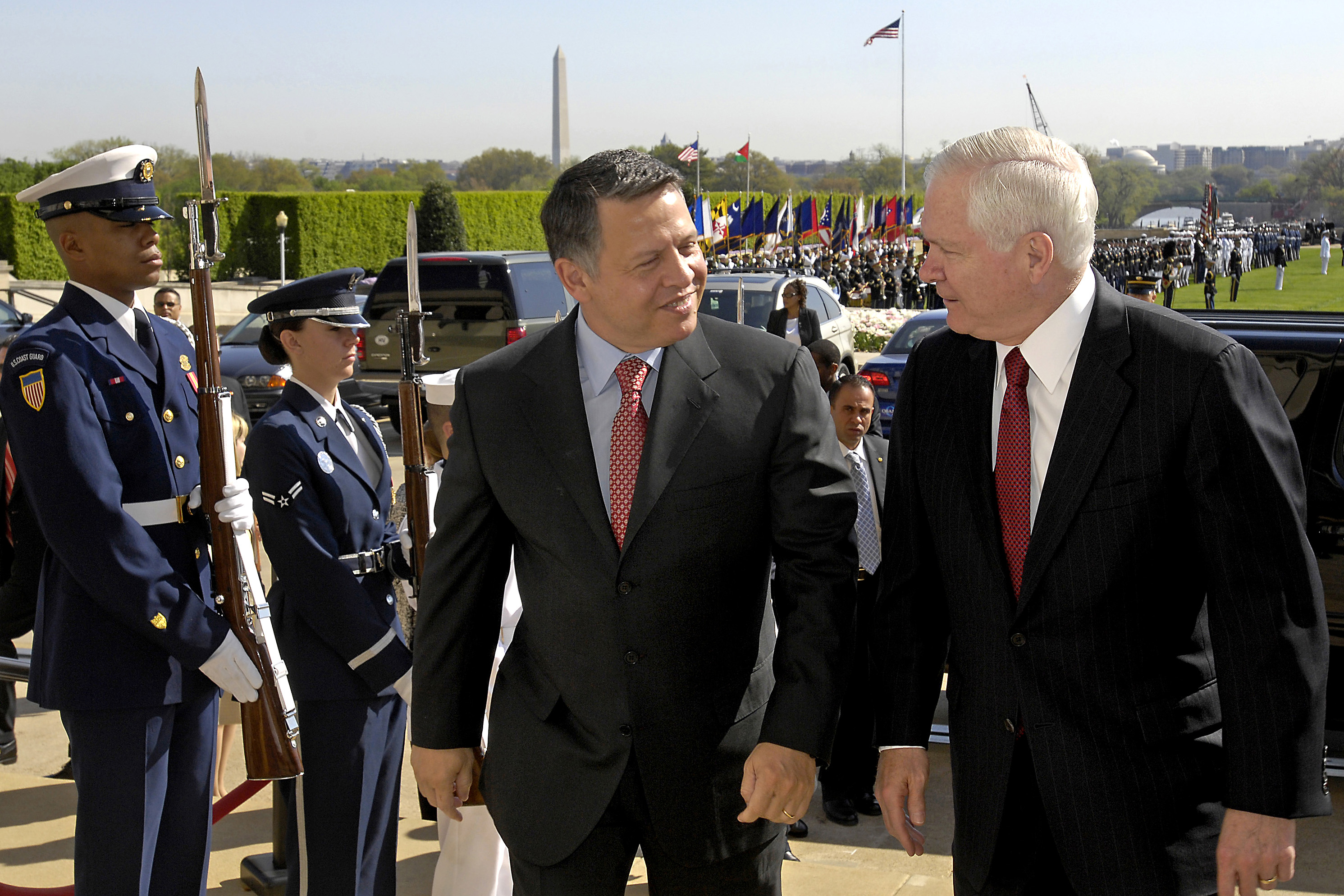

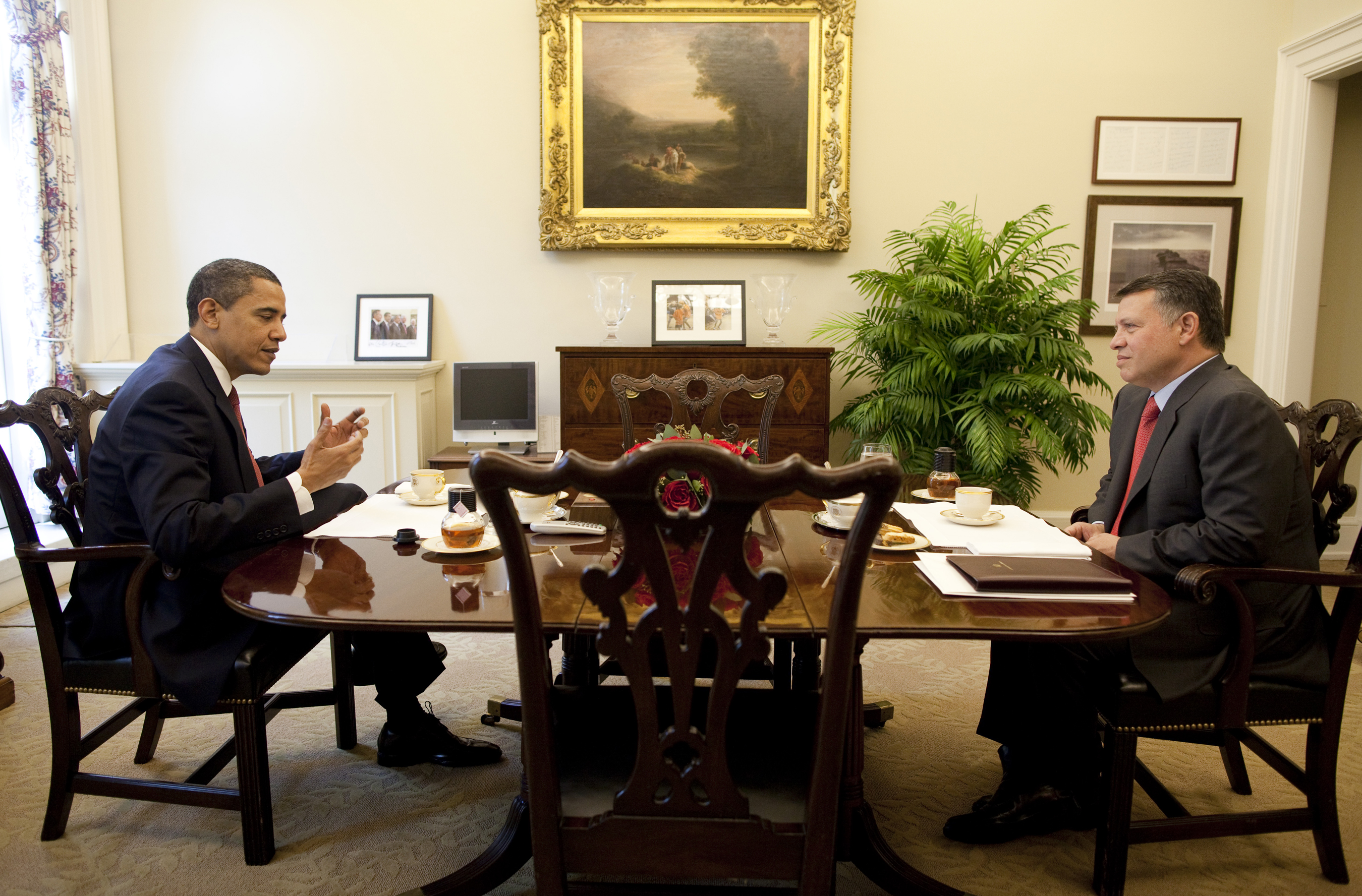

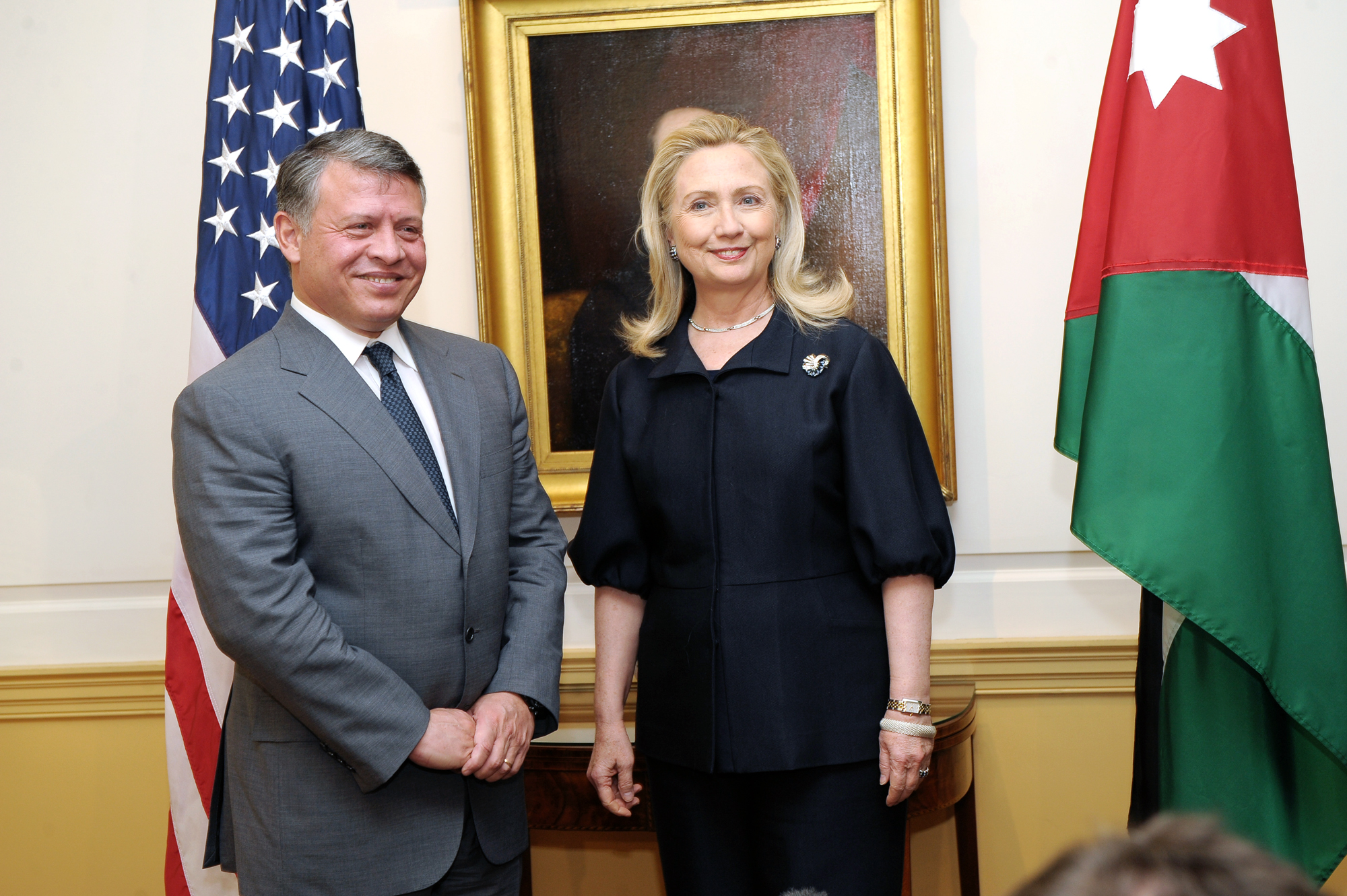

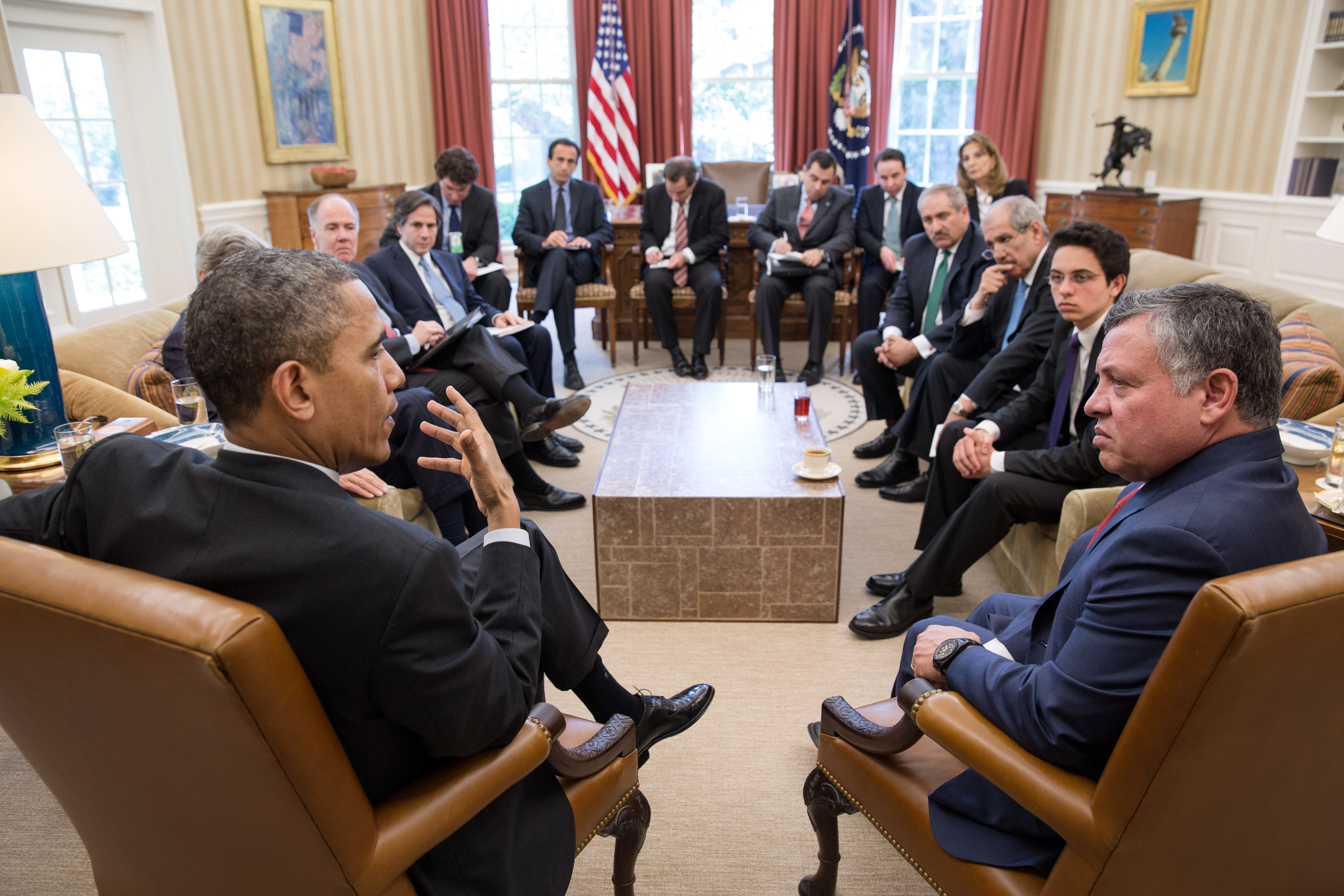

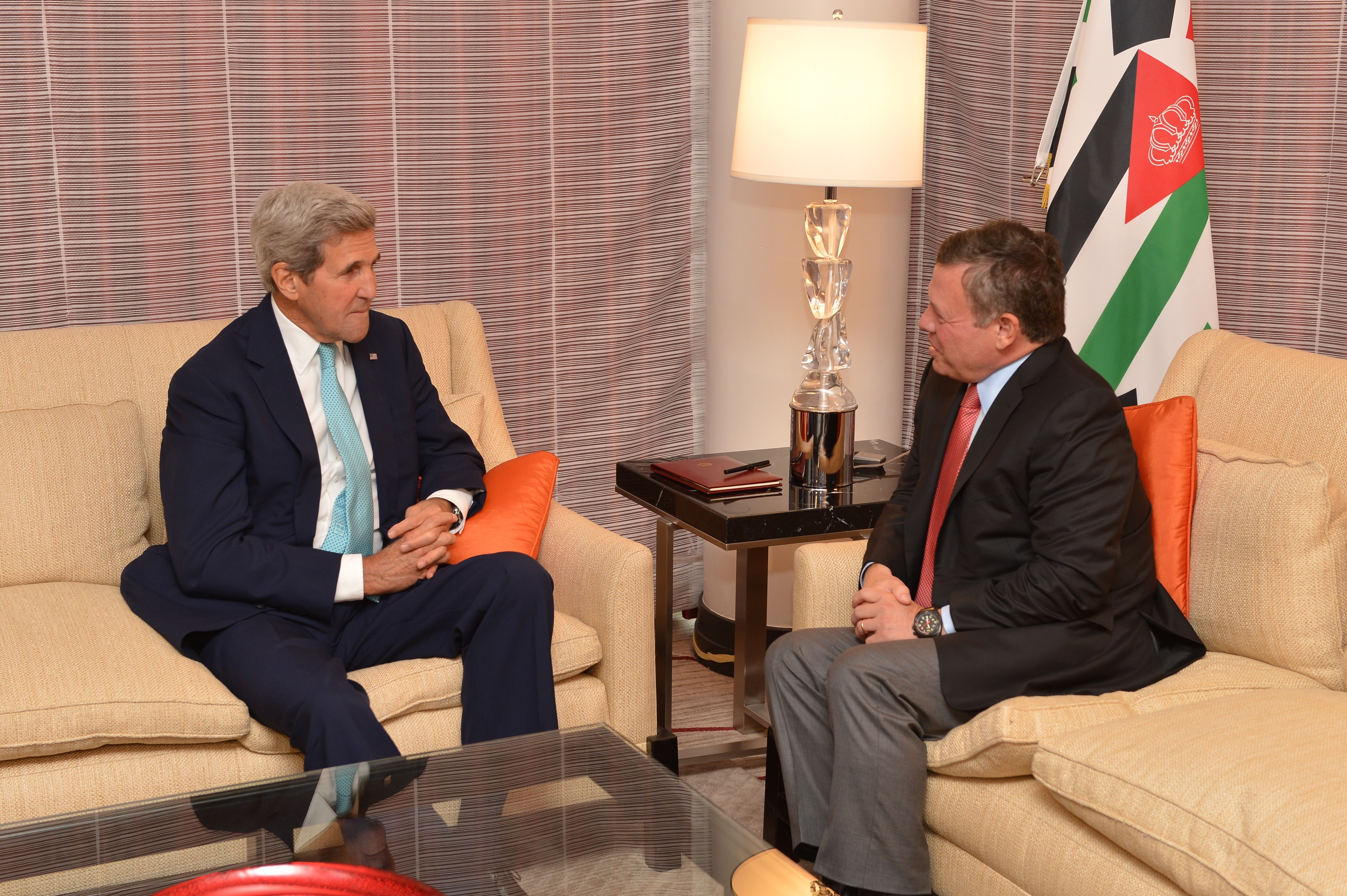

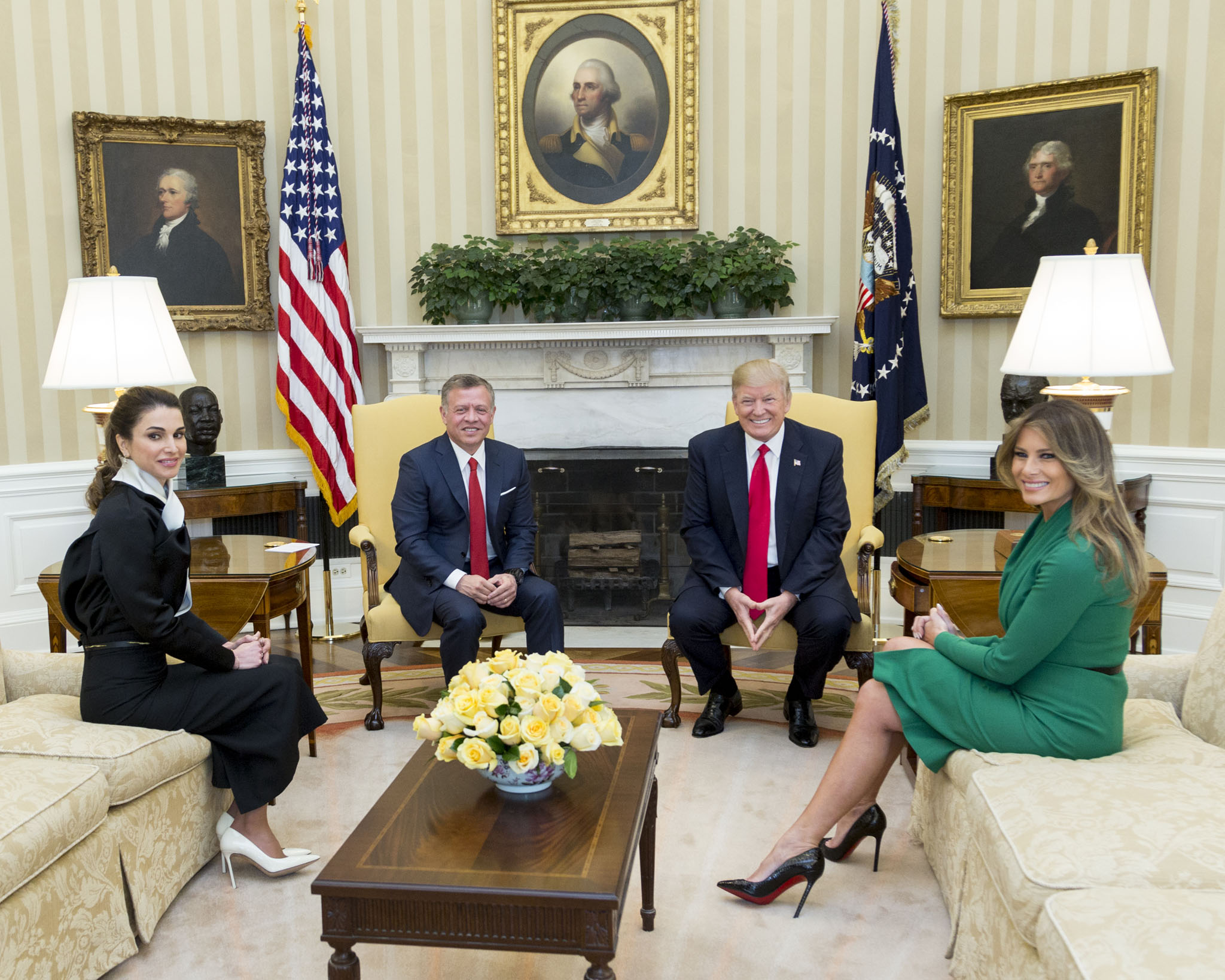

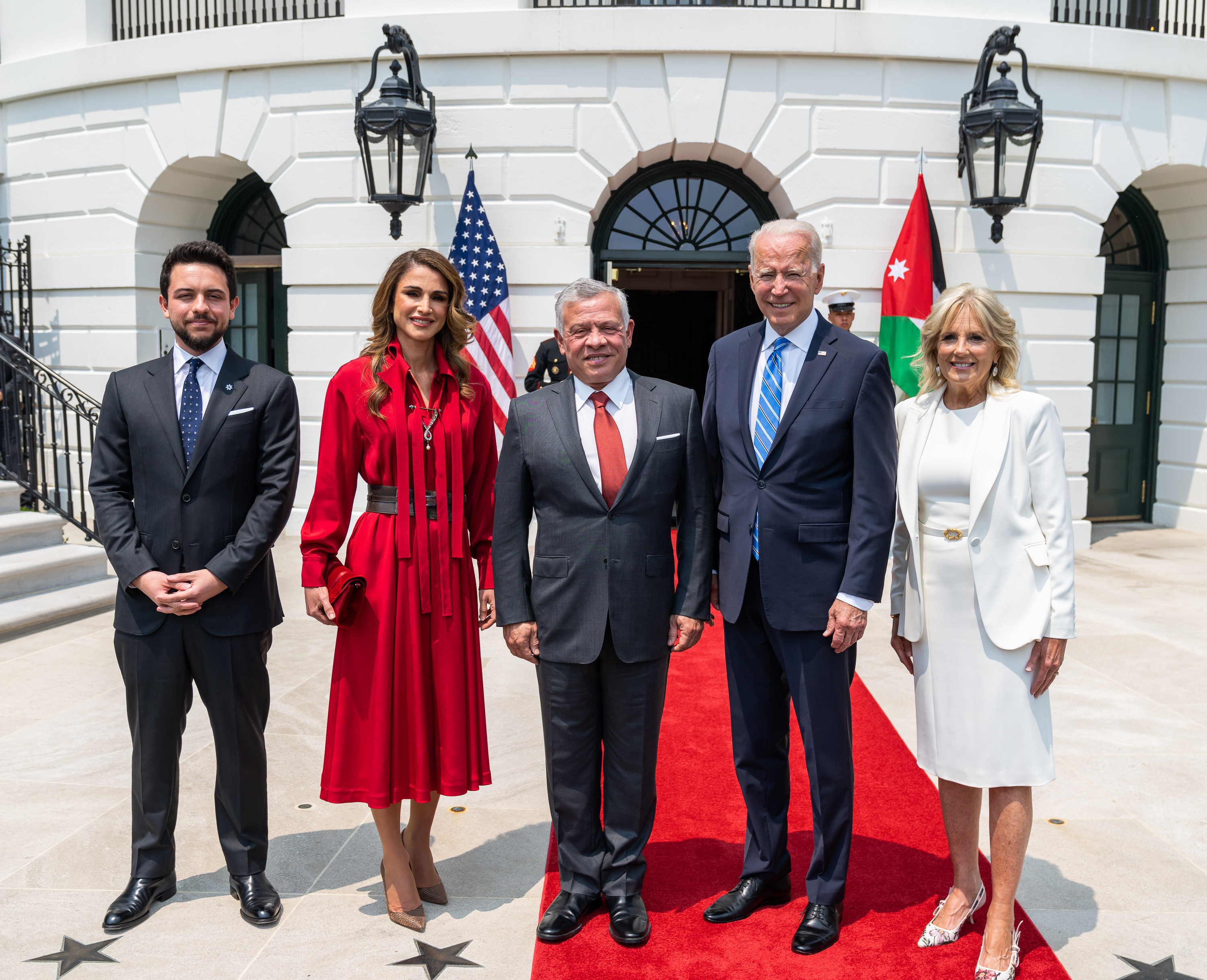

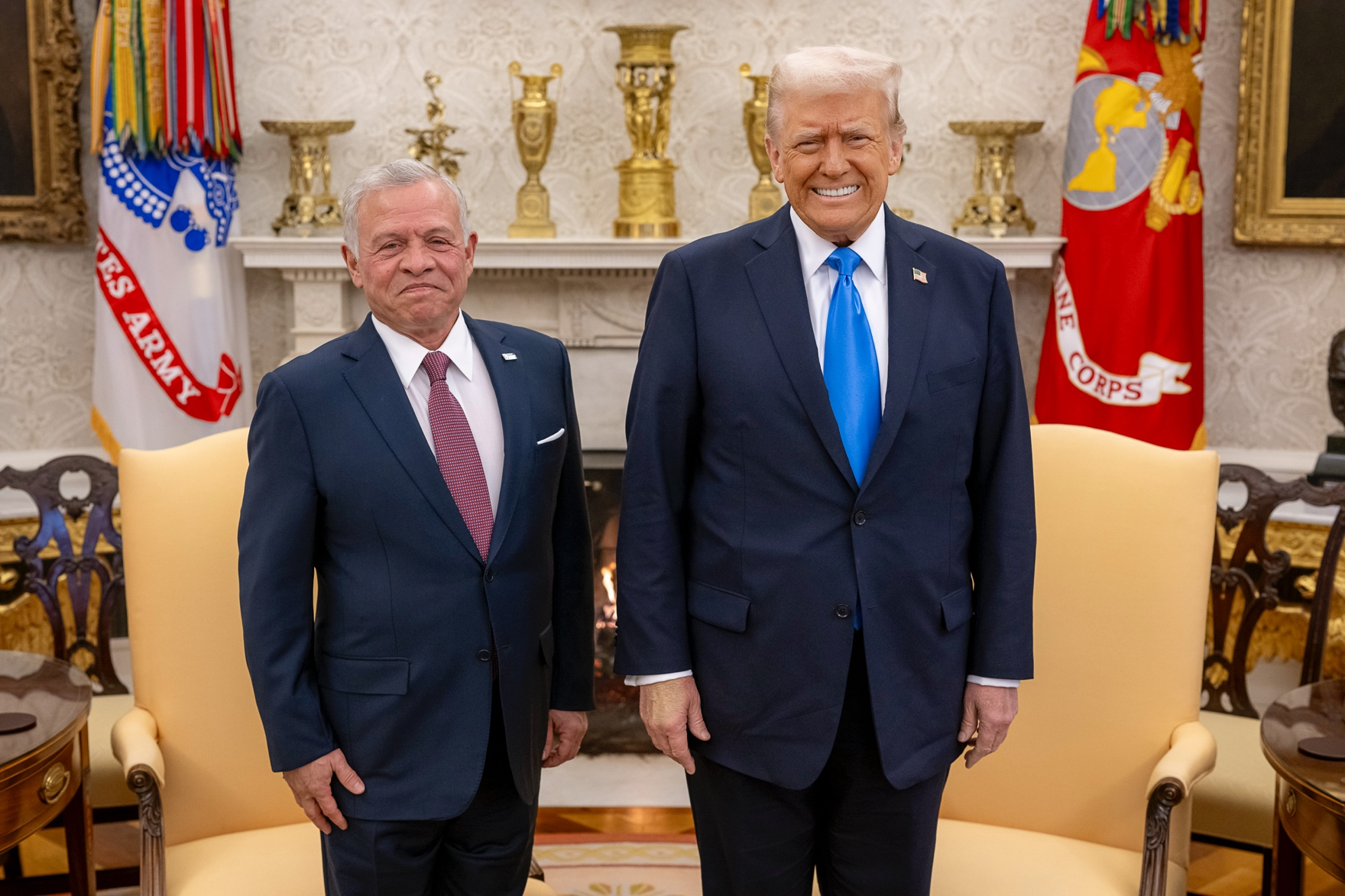

== Kazakhstan ==
Table of Trips
Start	End	Guest	Title	Reason
May 18, 1992	May 20, 1992	Nursultan Nazarbayev	President	Official working visit.
February 13, 1994	February 15, 1994	Nursultan Nazarbayev	President	Official working visit.
November 16, 1997	November 19, 1997	Nursultan Nazarbayev	President	Working visit. Attended 4th annual meeting of U.S.-Kazakh Joint Commission.
April 23, 1999	April 25, 1999	Nursultan Nazarbayev	President	Attended NATO's 50th Anniversary Summit.
December 20, 1999	December 21, 1999	Nursultan Nazarbayev	President	Met with President Clinton and attended a meeting of the U.S.-Kazakhstan Joint Commission.
December 20, 2001	December 21, 2001	Nursultan Nazarbayev	President	Working visit.
September 27, 2006	September 29, 2006	Nursultan Nazarbayev	President	Working visit.
April 11, 2010	April 13, 2010	Nursultan Nazarbayev	President	Attended the Nuclear Security Summit.
September 29, 2015	September 29, 2015	Nursultan Nazarbayev	President	Met with President Obama at the UN General Assembly in New York City.
March 31, 2016	April 1, 2016	Nursultan Nazarbayev	President	Attended the Nuclear Security Summit.
January 15, 2018	January 17, 2018	Nursultan Nazarbayev	President	Official Working Visit.
September 21, 2023	September 21, 2023	Kassym-Jomart Tokayev	President	Participated in C5+1 Presidential Summit Meeting with President Biden at the UN General Assembly in New York City.
November 5, 2025	November 7, 2025	Kassym-Jomart Tokayev	President	Participated in C5+1 Presidential Summit Meeting with President Trump at the White House.

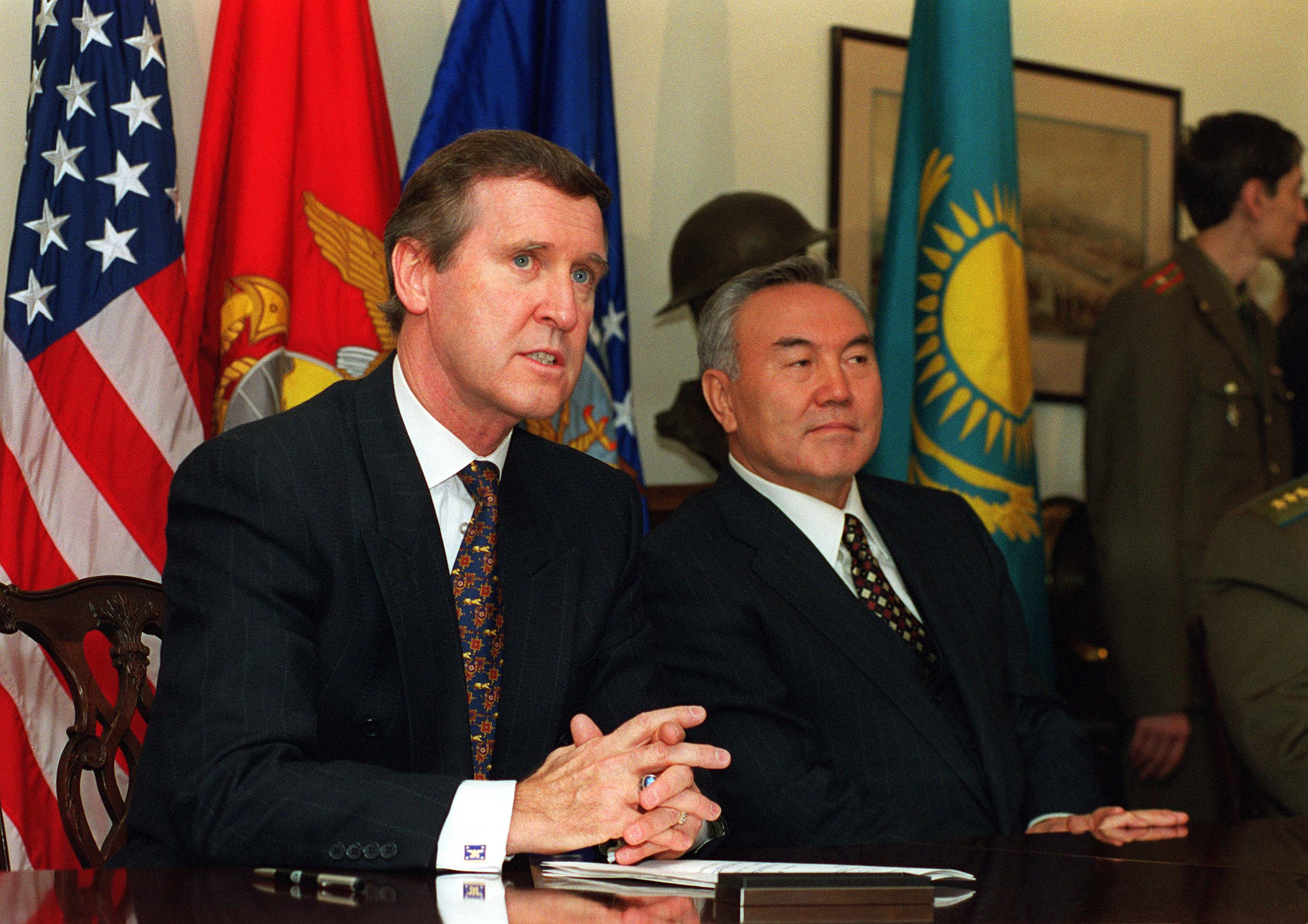

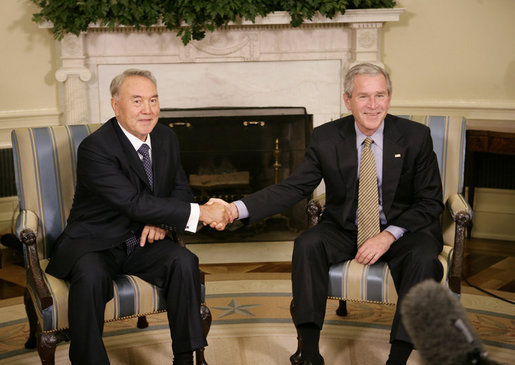

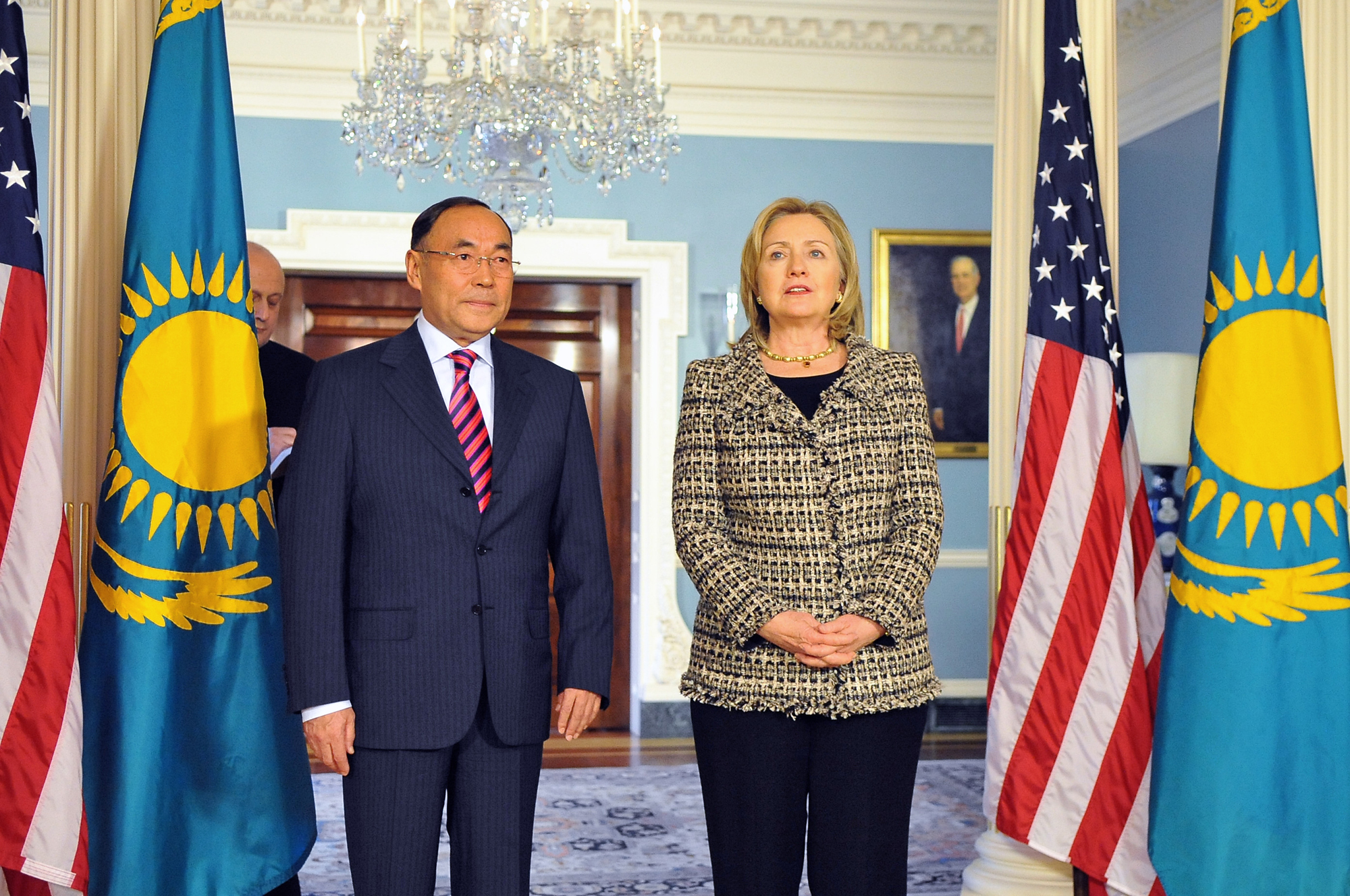

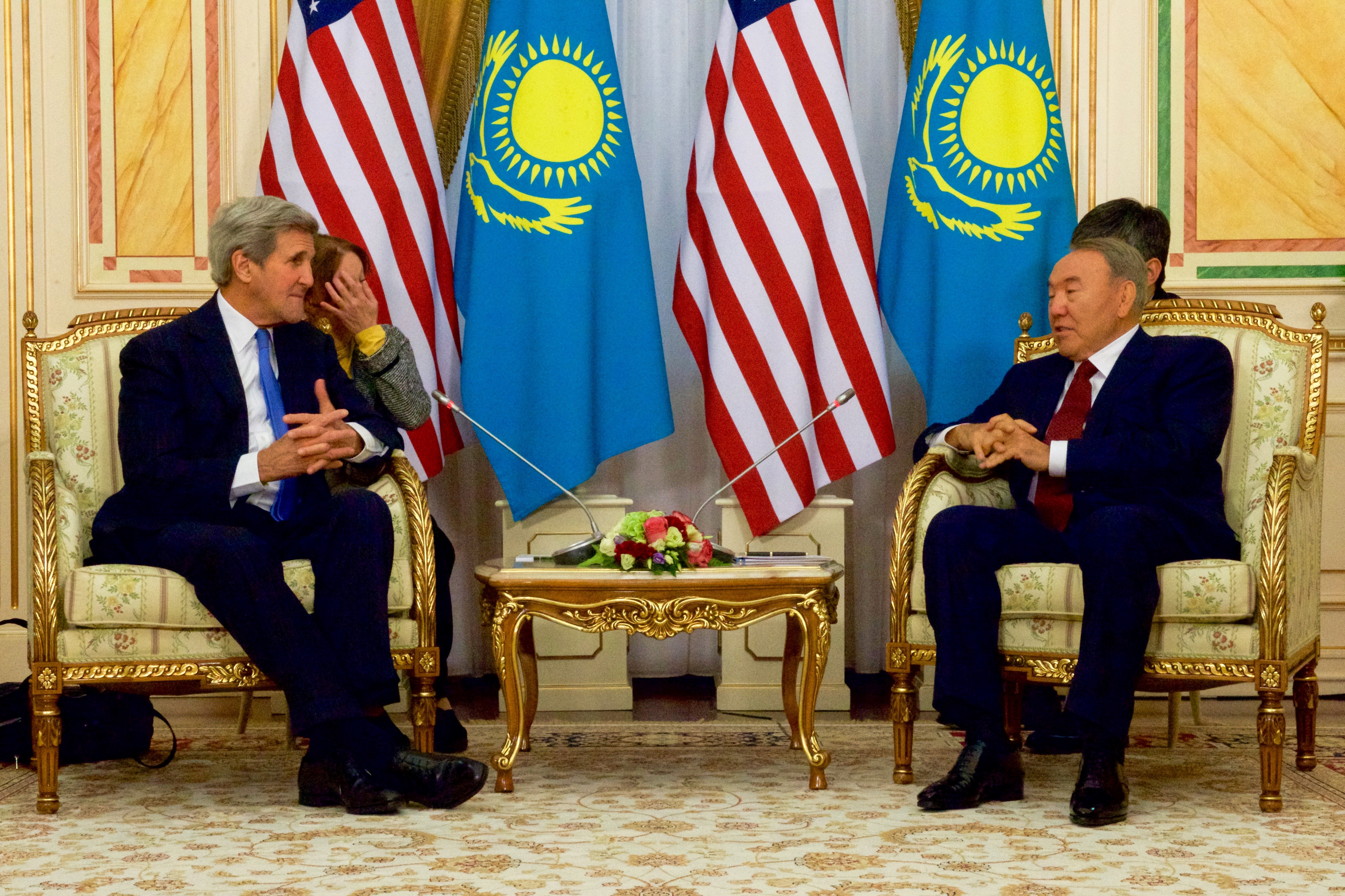

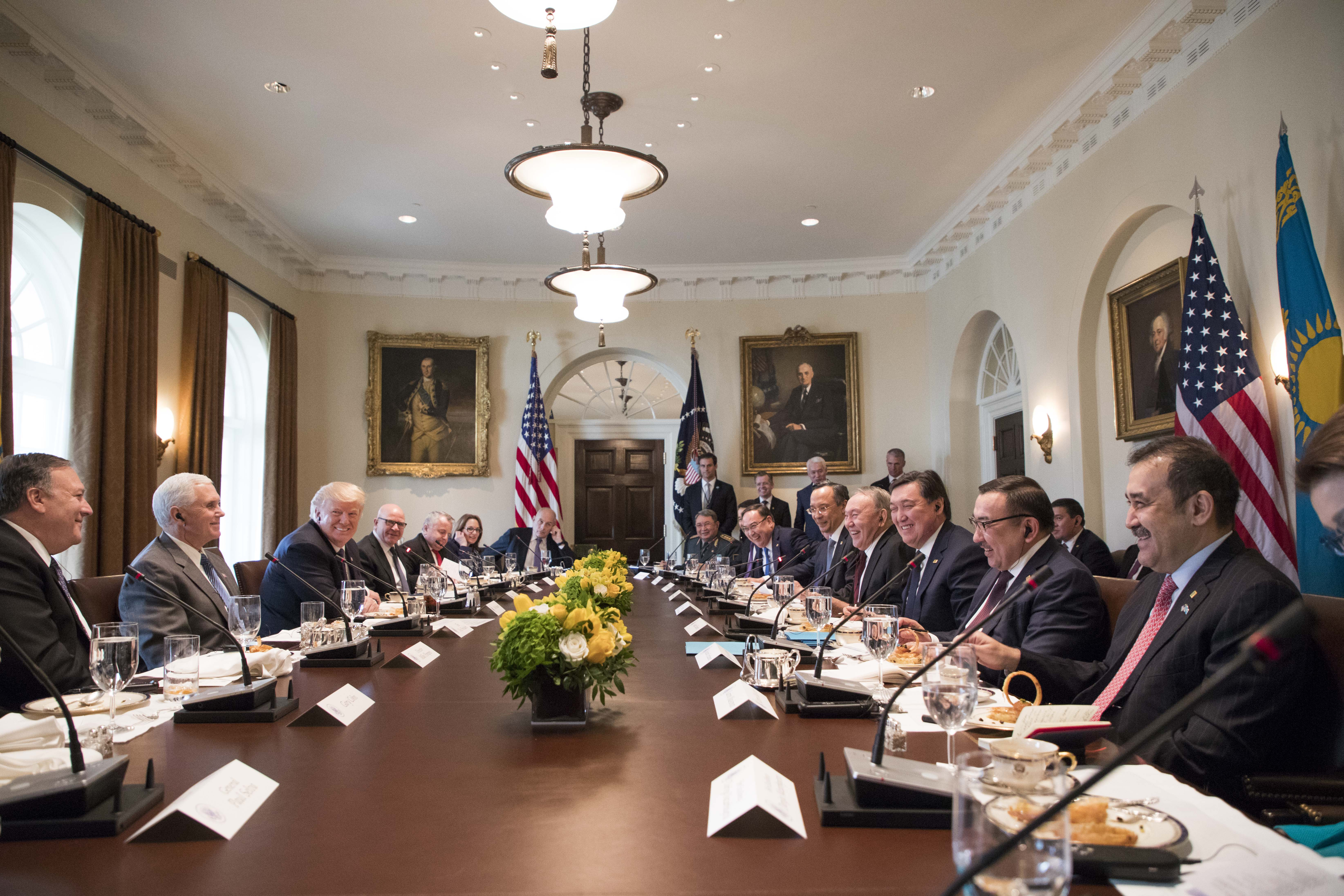

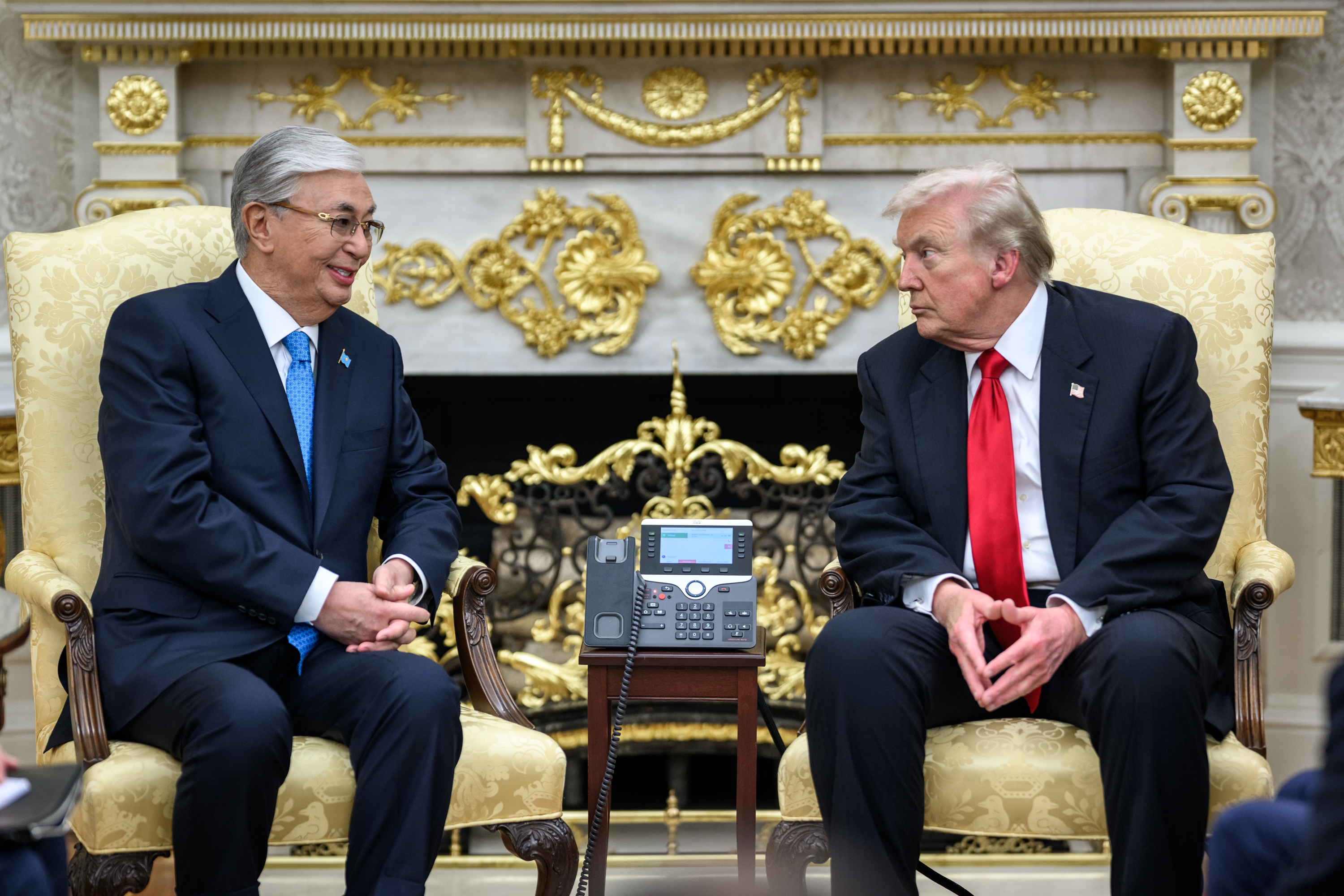

== Kyrgyzstan ==
Table of Trips
Start	End	Guest	Title	Reason
August 20, 2002	August 24, 2002	Askar Akayev	President	Working visit.
July 24, 2010	July 24, 2010	Roza Otunbayeva	President	Met with President Obama at the UN General Assembly in New York City.
September 21, 2023	September 21, 2023	Sadyr Japarov	President	Participated in C5+1 Presidential Summit Meeting with President Biden at the UN General Assembly in New York City.
November 5, 2025	November 6, 2025	Sadyr Japarov	President	Participated in C5+1 Presidential Summit Meeting with President Trump at the White House.

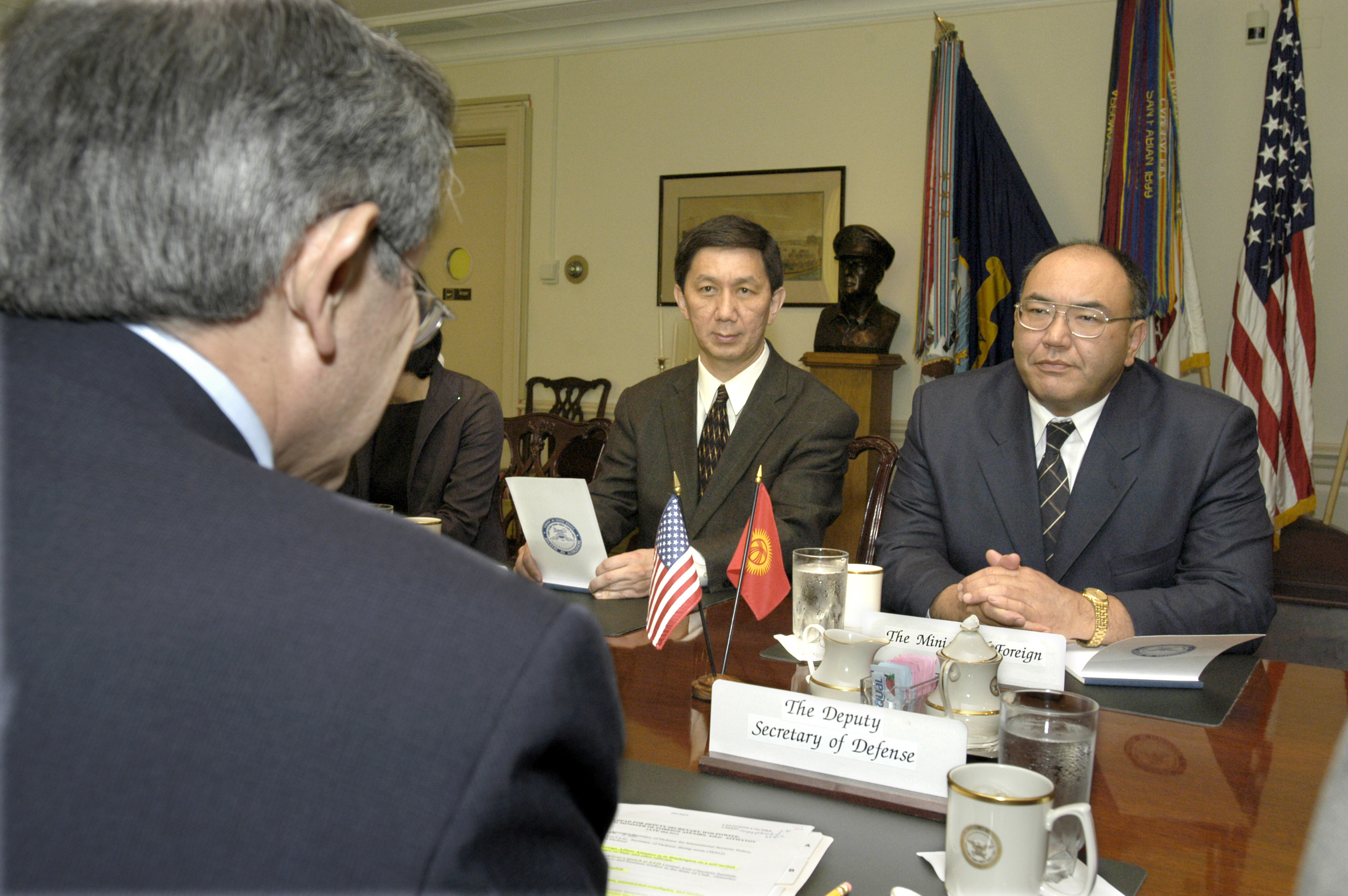

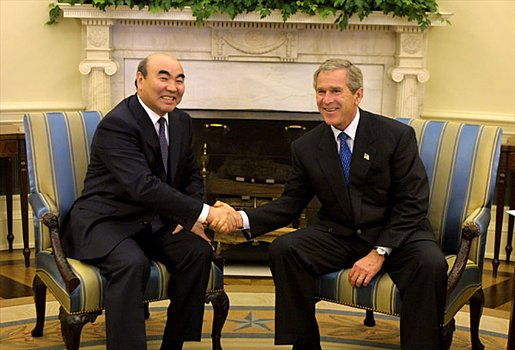

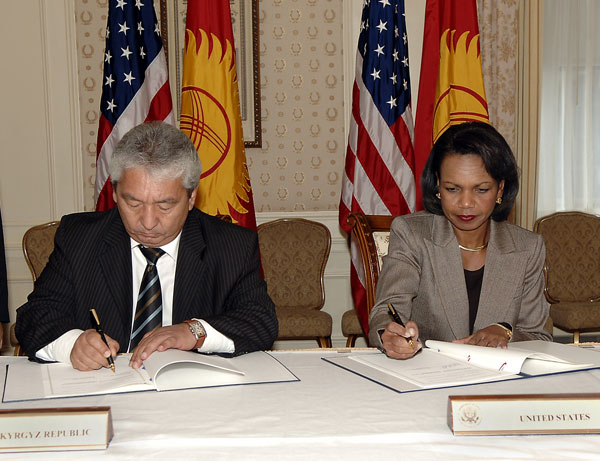

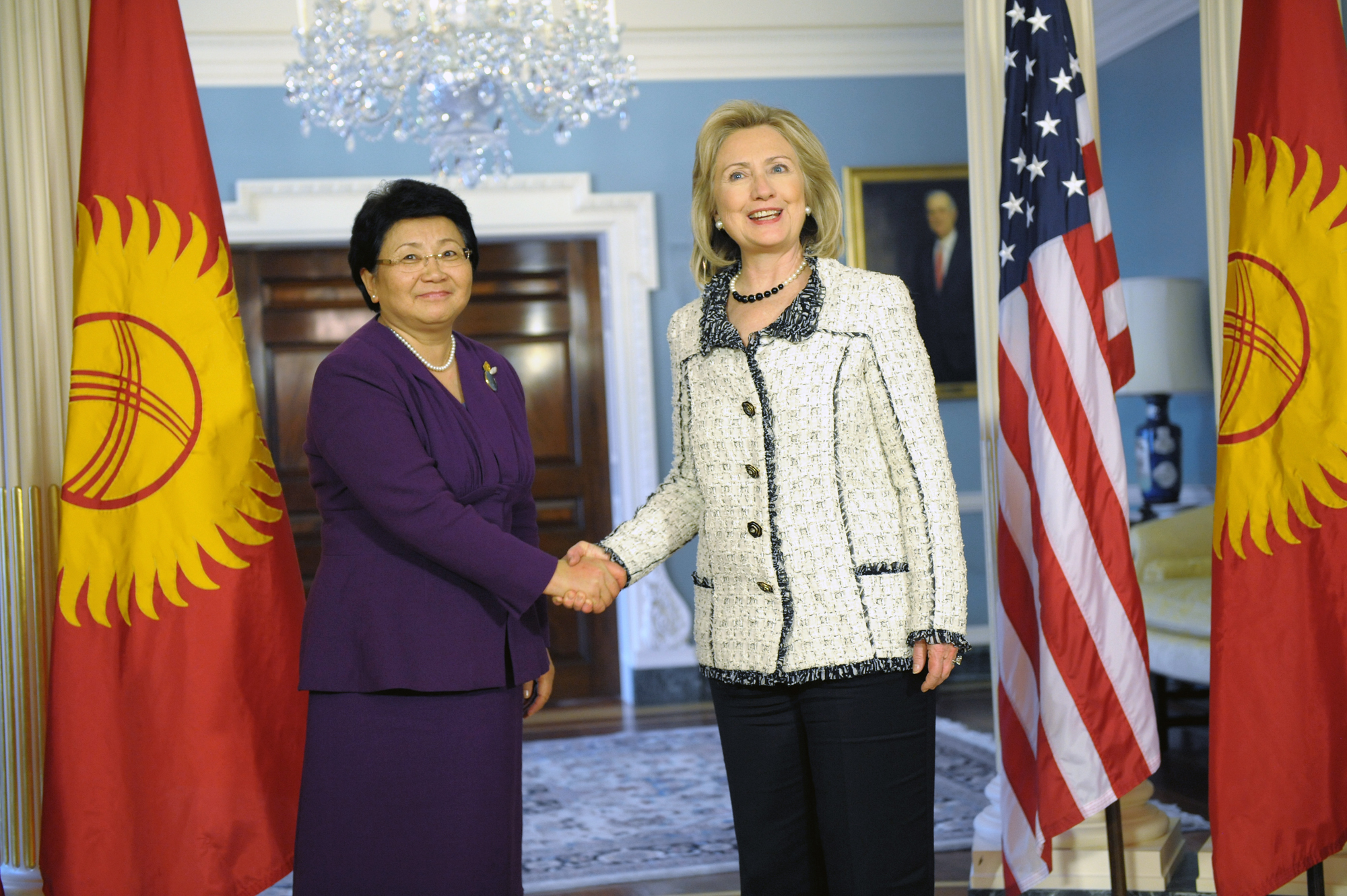

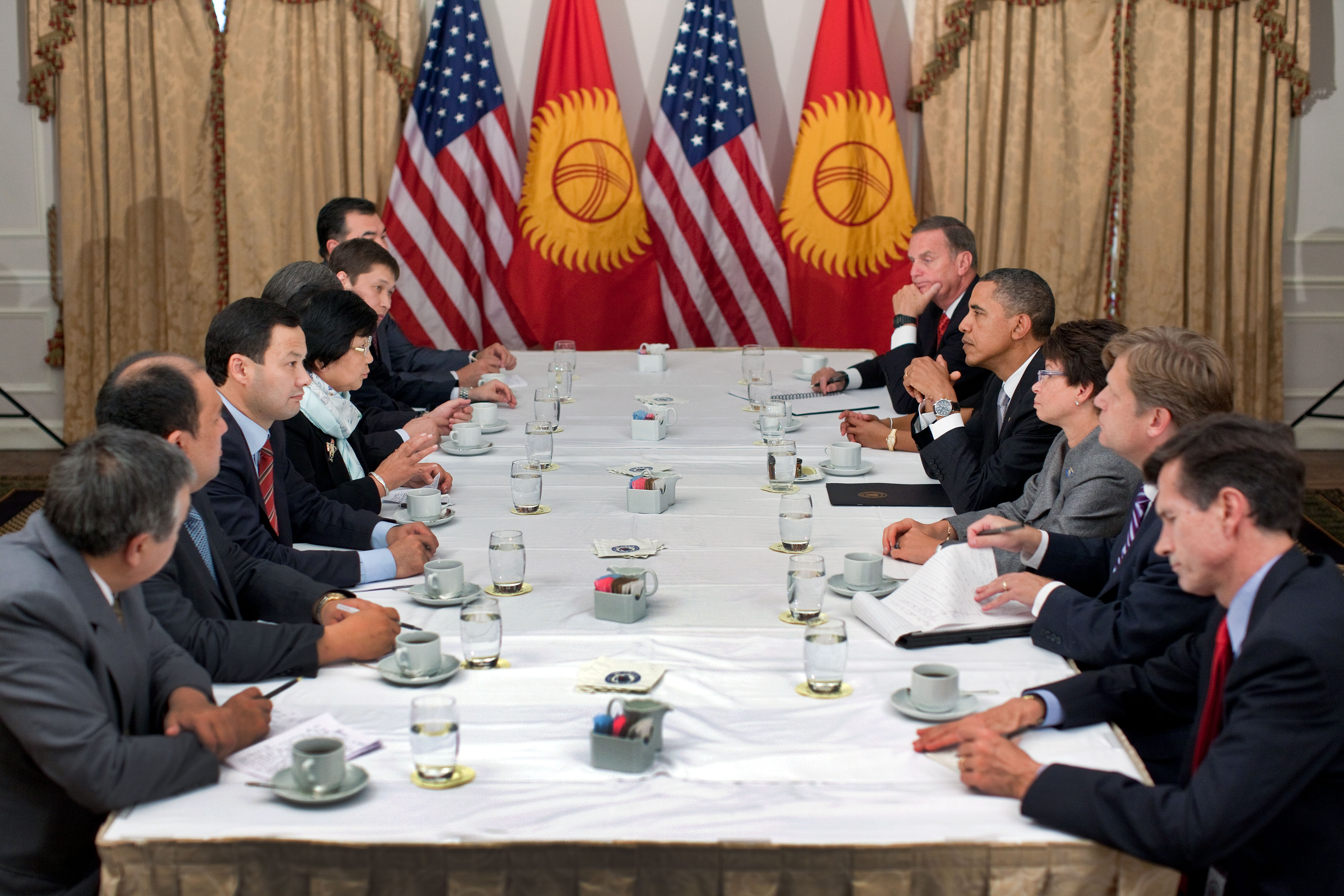

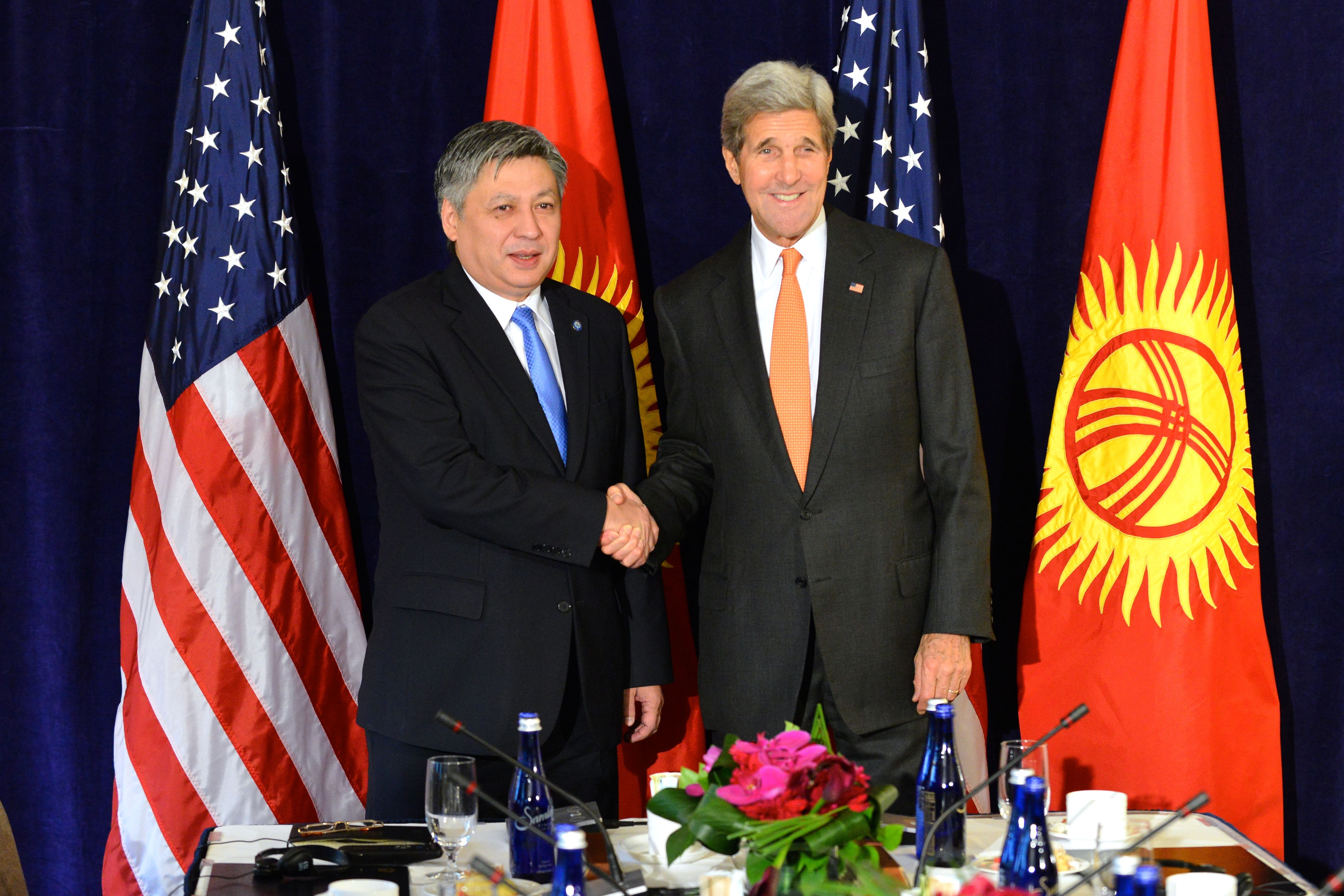

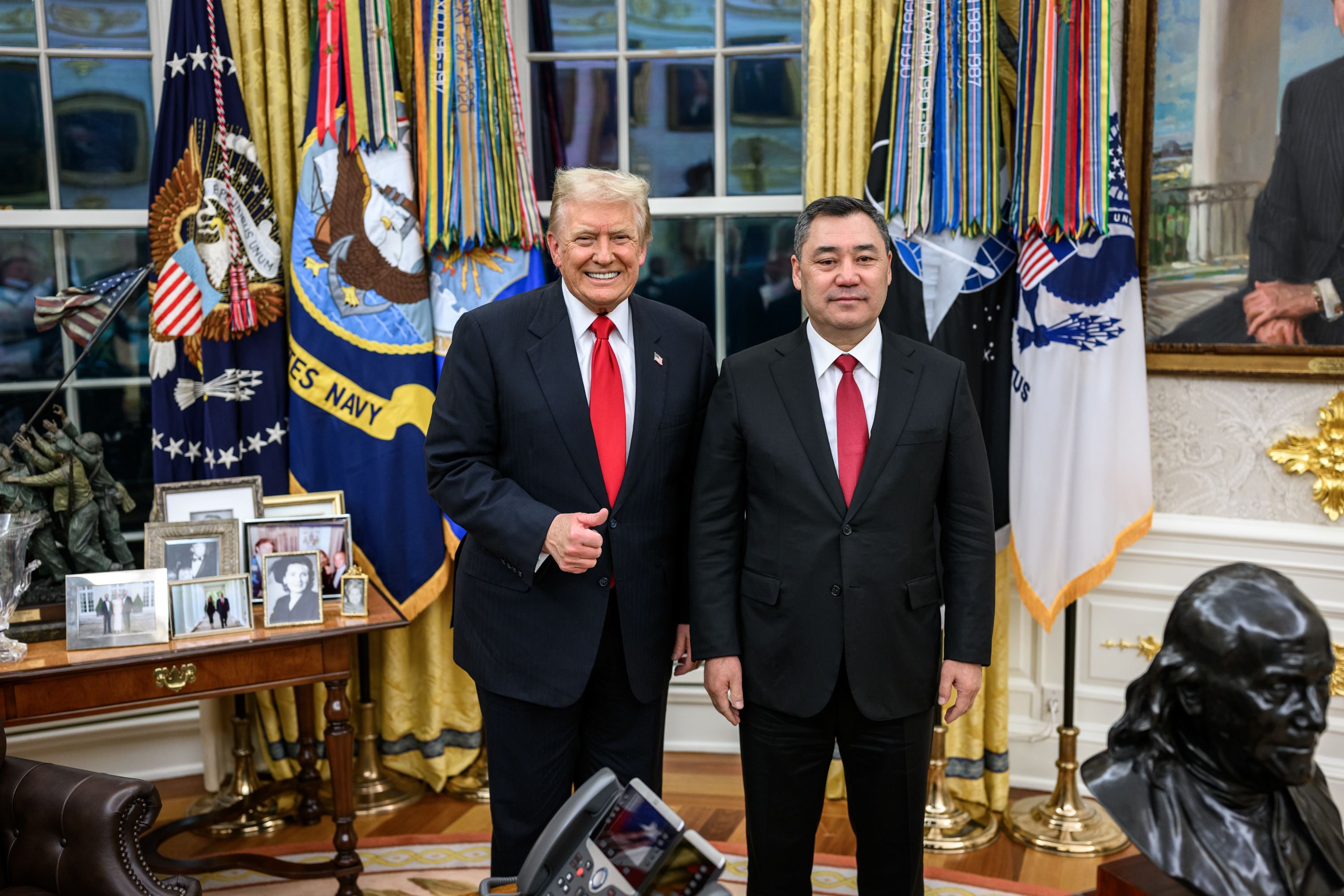

== Kuwait ==
Table of Trips
Start	End	Guest	Title	Reason
December 11, 1968	December 13, 1968	Sabah III Al-Salim Al-Sabah	Emir	State visit. Arrived in U.S.December 10; visited Annapolis, Cape Kennedy, Palm Beach, and New York City.Private visit to New York City and Washington, D.C. after December 17.
July 10, 1988	July 16, 1988	Saad Al-Salim Al-Sabah	Prime Minister	Official Working Visit.
September 26, 1988	September 26, 1988	Jabir al-Ahmad al-Jabir al-Sabah	Emir	Met with President Reagan while attending UN General Assembly in New York City.
September 28, 1990	September 28, 1990	Jabir al-Ahmad al-Jabir al-Sabah	Emir	Official Working Visit.
October 1, 1991	October 1, 1991	Jabir al-Ahmad al-Jabir al-Sabah	Emir	Met with President Bush during a private visit.
February 27, 1996	March 1, 1996	Jabir al-Ahmad al-Jabir al-Sabah	Emir	Working visit.
September 9, 2003	September 12, 2003	Sabah al-Ahmad al-Jabir al-Sabah	Prime Minister	Working visit.
July 1, 2005	July 1, 2005	Sabah al-Ahmad al-Jabir al-Sabah	Prime Minister	Working visit.
September 4, 2006	September 5, 2006	Sabah al-Ahmad al-Jabir al-Sabah	Emir	Working visit.
September 17, 2008	September 19, 2008	Nasser Al-Sabah	Prime Minister	Working visit.
July 3, 2009	July 3, 2009	Sabah al-Ahmad al-Jabir al-Sabah	Emir	Working visit.
September 13, 2013	September 13, 2013	Sabah al-Ahmad al-Jabir al-Sabah	Emir	Working visit.
May 13, 2015	May 15, 2015	Sabah al-Ahmad al-Jabir al-Sabah	Emir	Attended a Summit at Camp David, Maryland, for Gulf Cooperation Council Members on Countering Violent Extremism.
September 7, 2017	September 7, 2017	Sabah al-Ahmad al-Jabir al-Sabah	Emir	Official Working Visit.
September 5, 2018	September 5, 2018	Sabah al-Ahmad al-Jabir al-Sabah	Emir	Working Visit.

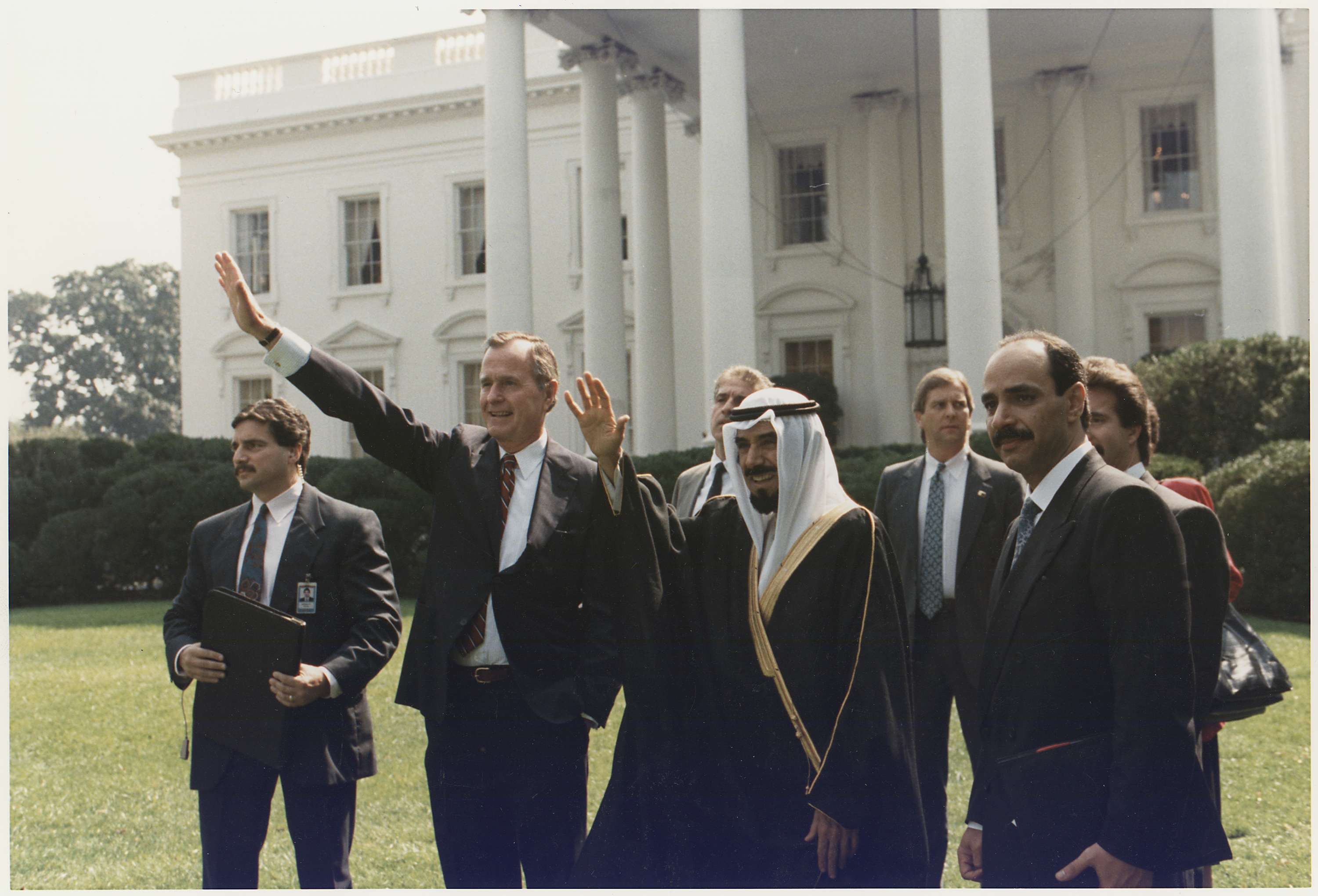

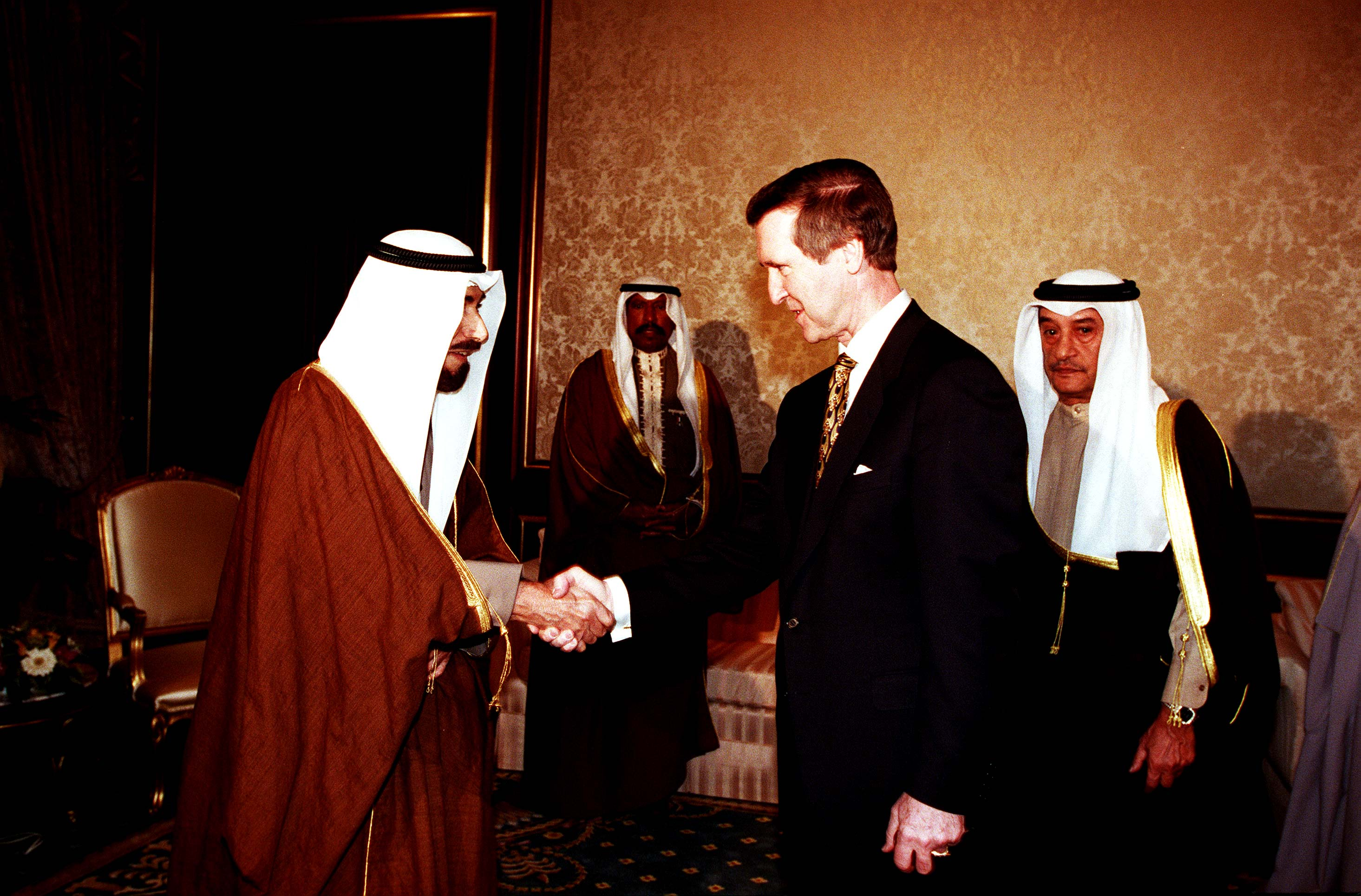

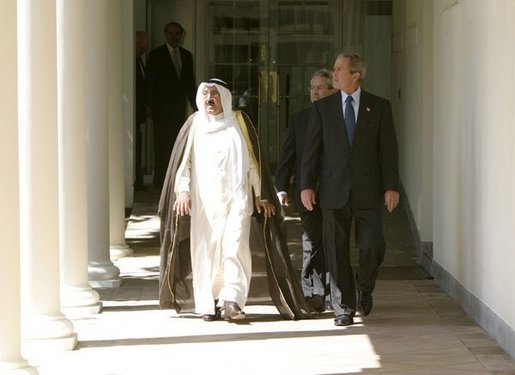

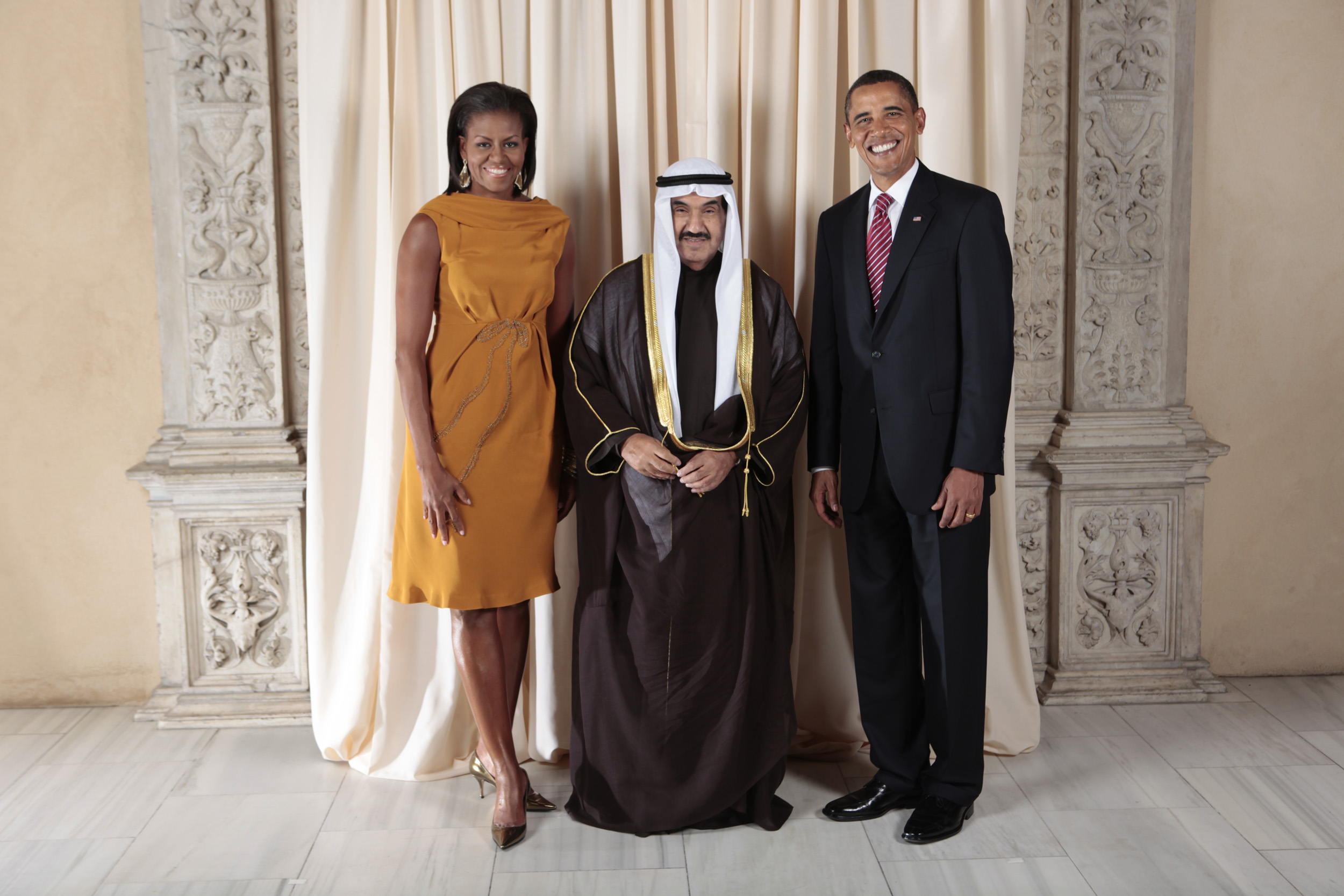

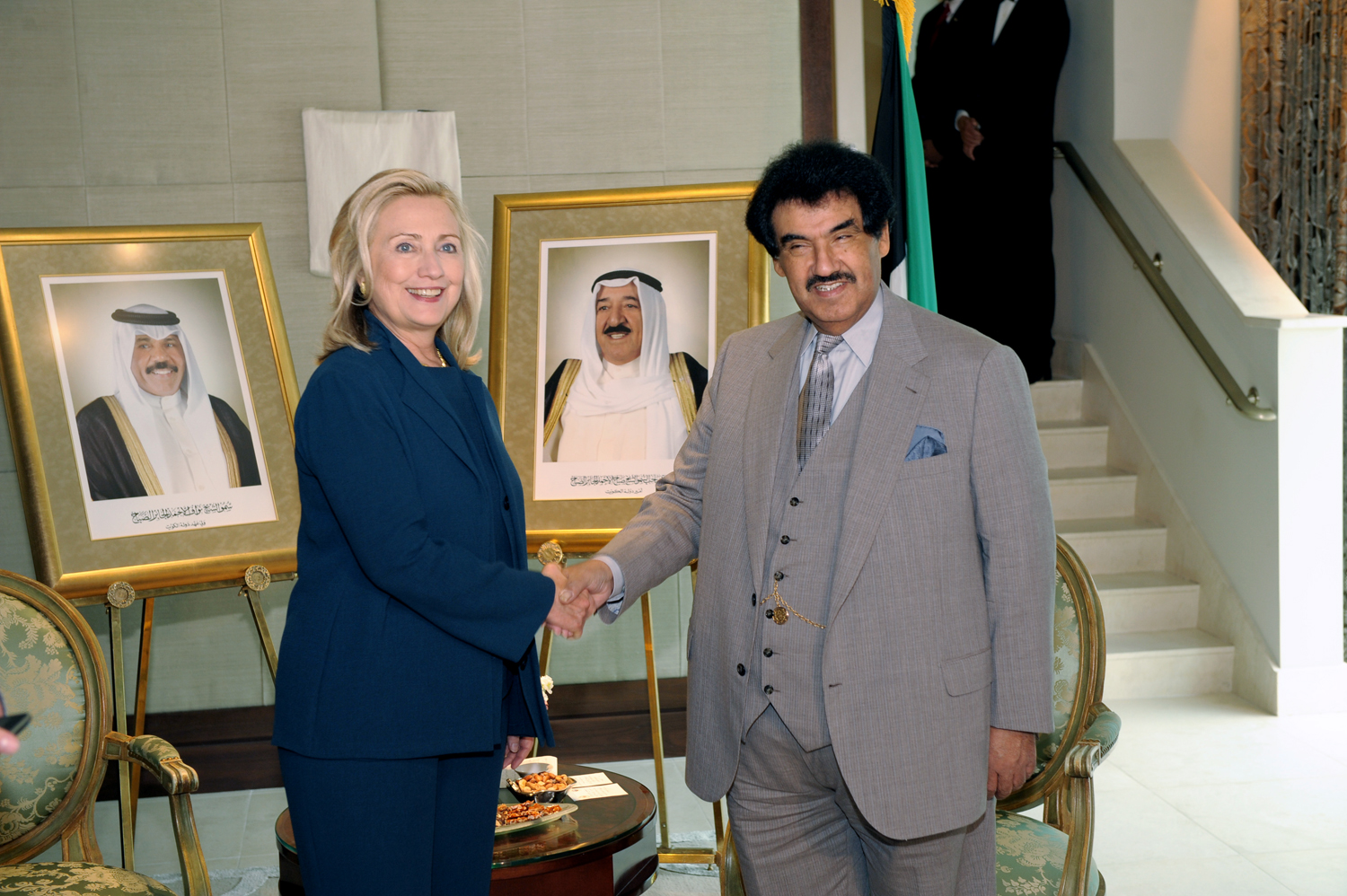

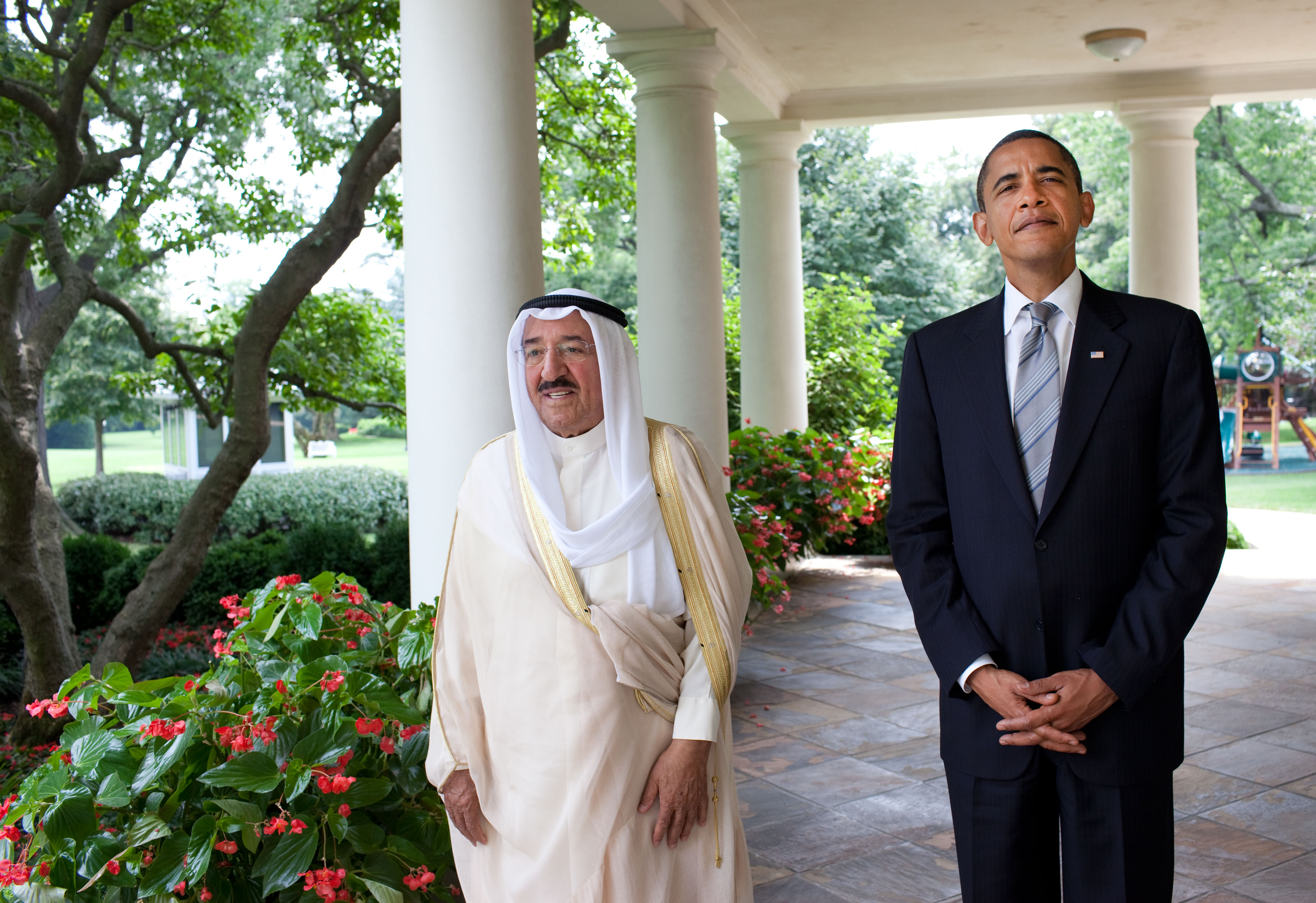

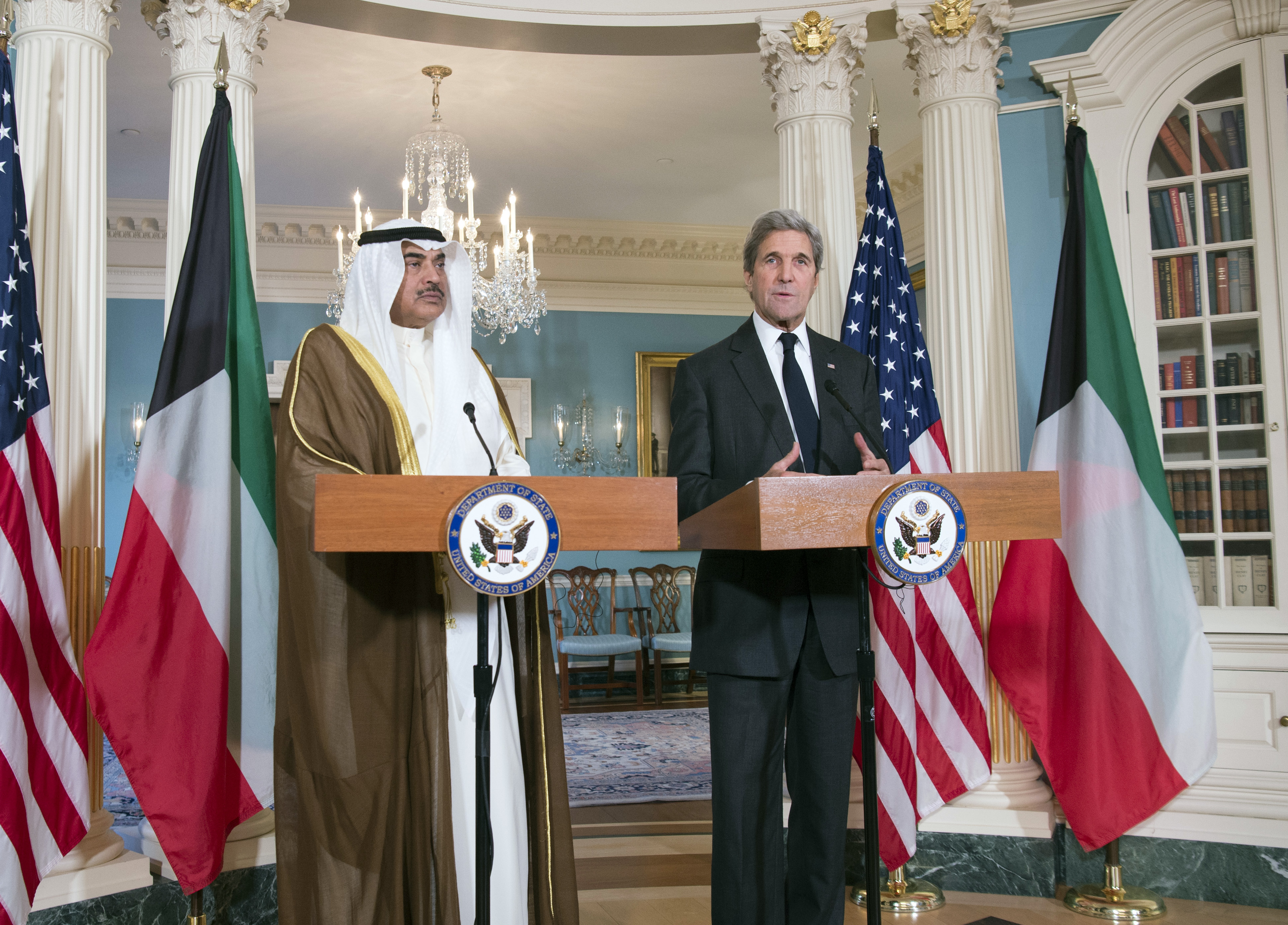

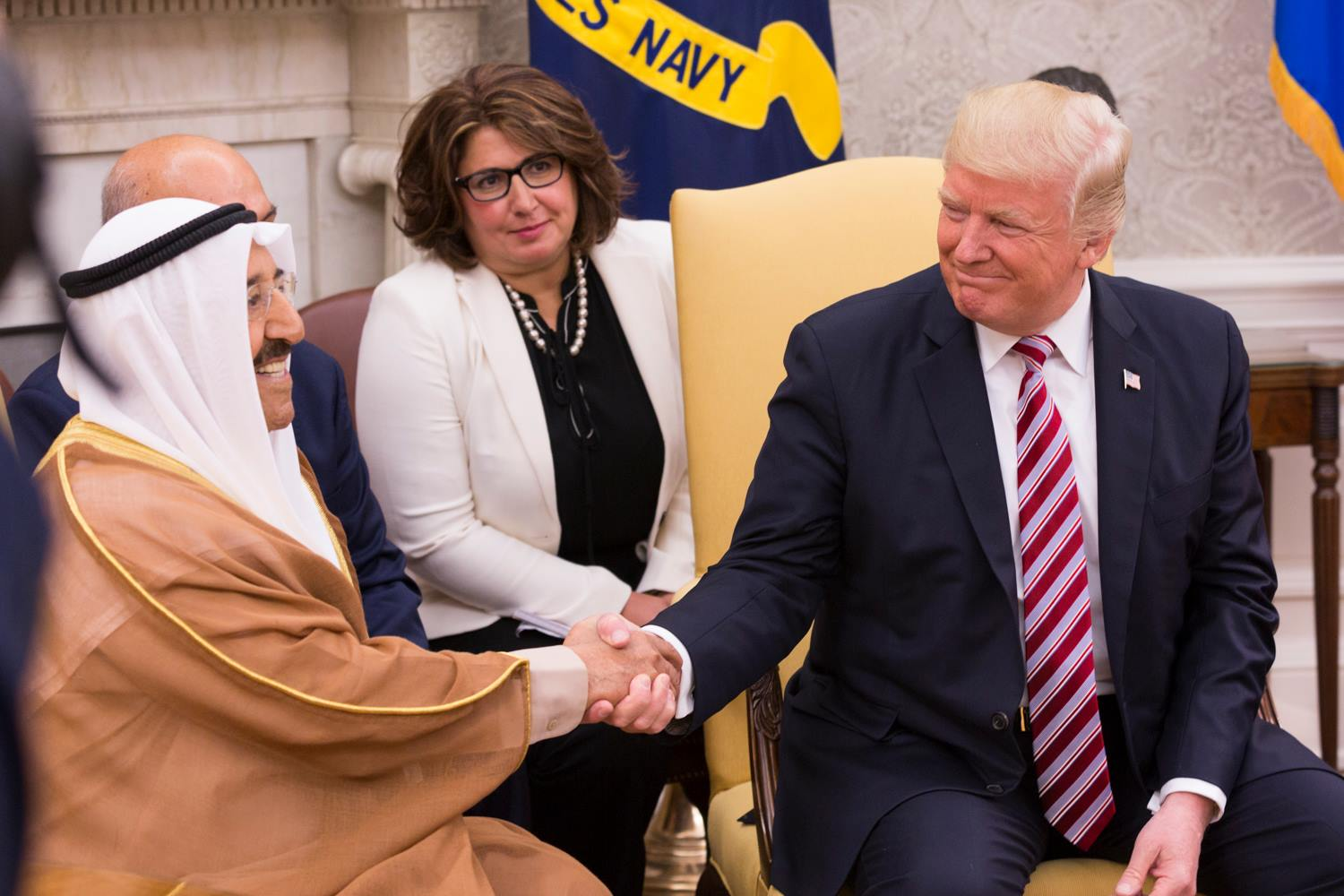

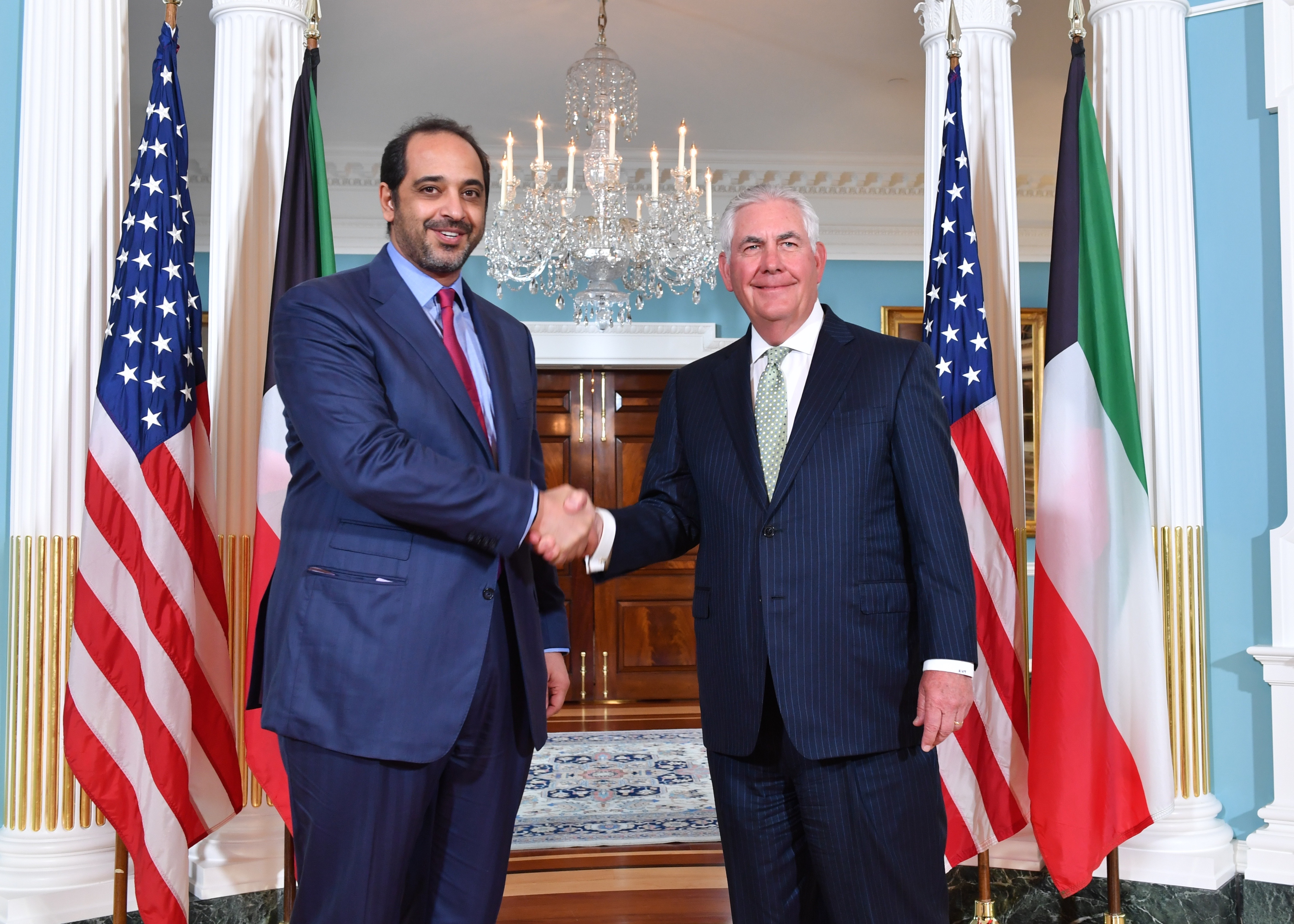

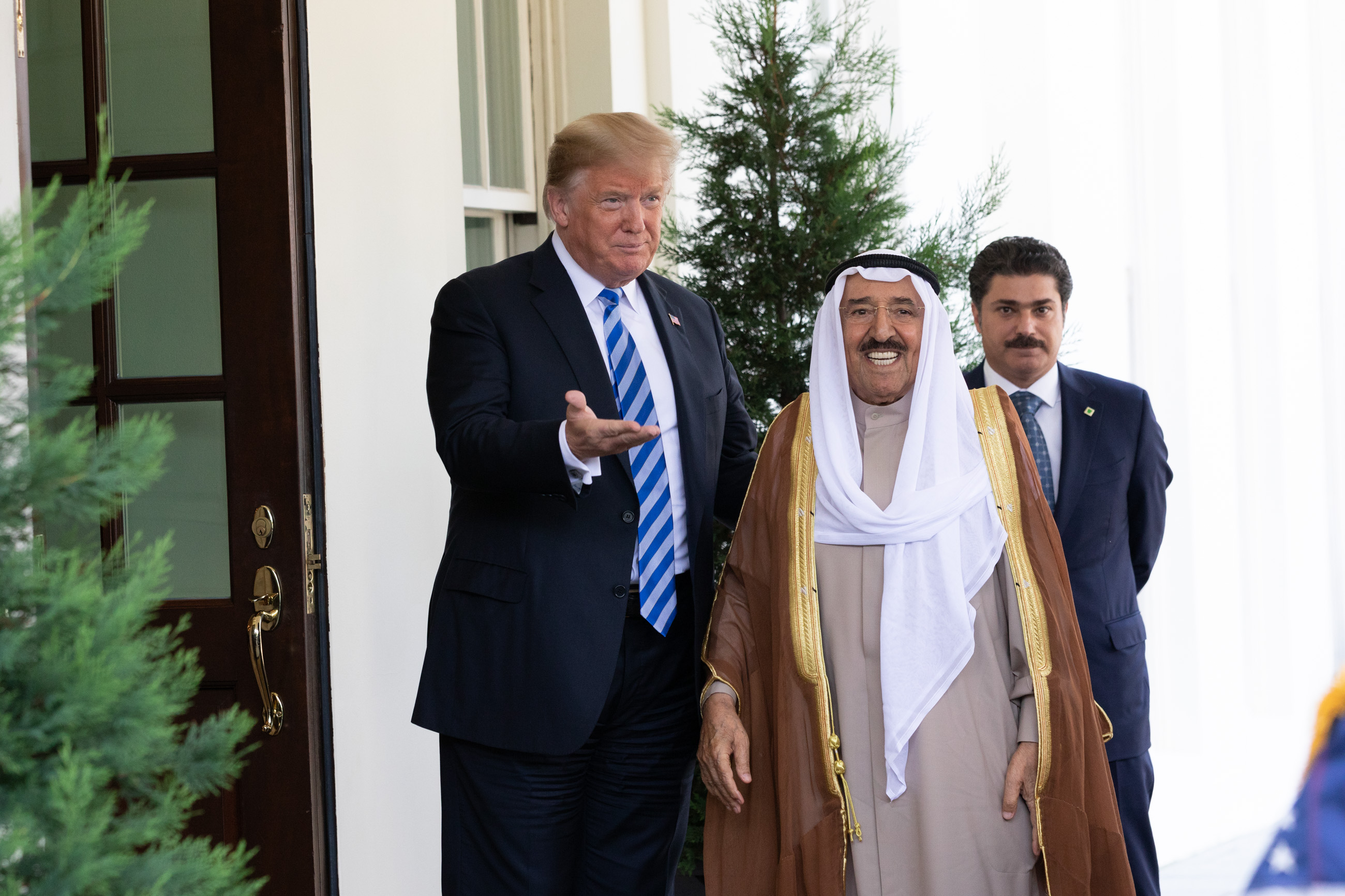

== Korea (Republic of) ==
Table of Trips
Start	End	Guest	Title	Reason
June 16, 1953	June 18, 1953	Baek Du-jin	Prime Minister	Discussed terms of the Korean truce agreement with President Eisenhower and senior officials.
July 26, 1954	July 31, 1954	Syngman Rhee	President	State visit. Afterwards visited New York City, Philadelphia, Chicago, Kansas City, Los Angeles, and San Francisco. Departed U.S.August 8.
November 13, 1961	November 17, 1961	Park Chung-hee	Chairman	Informal visit.In U.S.November 12–23, visiting New York City, San Francisco, and Honolulu, Hawaii.
November 24, 1963	November 25, 1963	Park Chung-hee	President	Attended funeral of President Kennedy.
May 17, 1965	May 19, 1965	Park Chung-hee	President	State visit. In U.S.May 16–26, visited Williamsburg, New York City, West Point, Pittsburgh, Cape Kennedy, and Los Angeles.
March 14, 1967	March 16, 1967	Chung Il-kwon	Prime Minister	Informal visit. In U.S.March 12–17; visited Philadelphia, New York City, San Francisco, and Los Angeles.
April 17, 1968	April 18, 1968	Park Chung-hee	President	Discussed the crisis in Korean Crisis and the Vietnam War with President Johnson in Honolulu, Hawaii.
March 31, 1969	April 1, 1969	Chung Il-kwon	Prime Minister	Attended funeral of former President Eisenhower; met with President Nixon April 1.
August 20, 1969	August 22, 1969	Park Chung-hee	President	Official visit at San Francisco. Private visit afterward until August 24.
January 5, 1973	January 5, 1973	Kim Jong-pil	Prime Minister	Attended memorial services for former President Truman.
January 28, 1981	February 28, 1981	Chun Doo-hwan	President	Official visit.
April 25, 1985	April 27, 1985	Chun Doo-hwan	President	Official Working Visit.
October 20, 1988	October 20, 1988	Roh Tae-woo	President	Official Working Visit.
October 16, 1989	October 18, 1989	Roh Tae-woo	President	Official working visit to Washington; private visit to Los Angeles afterward.
June 6, 1990	June 6, 1990	Roh Tae-woo	President	Private visit. Had met with Soviet President Mikhail Gorbachev in San Francisco, June 4.
July 1, 1991	July 3, 1991	Roh Tae-woo	President	State Visit.
August 23, 1991	August 23, 1991	Roh Tae-woo	President	Met with President Bush while attending the UN General Assembly in New York City.
November 18, 1993	November 20, 1993	Kim Young-sam	President	Attended Asia-Pacific Economic Cooperation meeting in Seattle. Visited Washington, D.C. November 21–23.
July 25, 1995	July 28, 1995	Kim Young-sam	President	State Visit. Addressed a Joint session of Congress and attended dedication of the Korean War Memorial.
June 26, 1997	June 26, 1997	Kim Young-sam	President	Met with President Clinton at the UN Ecology Summit in New York City.
June 8, 1998	June 11, 1998	Kim Dae-jung	President	State Visit. Arrived in New York City June 6. Addressed Joint Meeting of Congress June 10. Afterward visited San Francisco and Los Angeles. Departed the U.S. June 13.
July 2, 1999	July 3, 1999	Kim Dae-jung	President	Official working visit.
August 7, 2000	August 7, 2000	Kim Dae-jung	President	Met with President Clinton at the UN Millennium Summit in New York City.
March 6, 2001	March 9, 2001	Kim Dae-jung	President	Working visit. Later visited Chicago.
May 12, 2003	May 16, 2003	Roh Moo-hyun	President	Working visit.Visited New York City May 12 and San Francisco May 15.
June 10, 2005	June 10, 2005	Roh Moo-hyun	President	Working visit.
August 12, 2006	August 14, 2006	Roh Moo-hyun	President	Working visit.
April 16, 2008	April 19, 2008	Lee Myung-bak	President	Working visit. Met with President Bush at Camp David
November 14, 2008	November 15, 2008	Lee Myung-bak	President	Attended the G-20 Economic Summit meeting.
June 16, 2009	June 16, 2009	Lee Myung-bak	President	Working Visit.
September 24, 2009	September 25, 2009	Lee Myung-bak	President	Attended the G-20 Economic Summit meeting in Pittsburgh
April 12, 2010	April 13, 2010	Lee Myung-bak	President	Attended the Nuclear Security Summit
October 12, 2011	October 14, 2011	Lee Myung-bak	President	State Visit. Also visited Lake Orion Michigan.
October 10, 2011	October 13, 2011	Lee Myung-bak	President	Attended the Asia-Pacific Economic Cooperation Summit at Honolulu and Kapolei, Hawaii.
May 6, 2013	May 8, 2013	Park Geun-hye	President	Working visit.
October 16, 2015	October 16, 2015	Park Geun-hye	President	Official Working Visit.
March 31, 2016	April 1, 2016	Park Geun-hye	President	Attended the Nuclear Security Summit
June 29, 2017	June 30, 2017	Moon Jae-in	President	Official Working Visit.
May 22, 2018	May 22, 2018	Moon Jae-in	President	Official Working Visit.
April 10, 2019	April 11, 2019	Moon Jae-in	President	Official Working Visit.
May 21, 2021	May 21, 2021	Moon Jae-in	President	Official Working Visit.
April 26, 2023	April 26, 2023	Yoon Suk Yeol	President	State Visit.
August 18, 2023	August 18, 2023	Yoon Suk Yeol	President	Attended Trilateral Summit at Camp David, Maryland
November 12, 2023	November 17, 2023	Yoon Suk Yeol	President	Attended the APEC Leaders' Summit at San Francisco, California.
July 10, 2024	July 11, 2024	Yoon Suk Yeol	President	Attended NATO 75th Anniversary Summit in Washington, D.C.
August 25, 2025	August 25, 2025	Lee Jae-myung	President	Official Working Visit

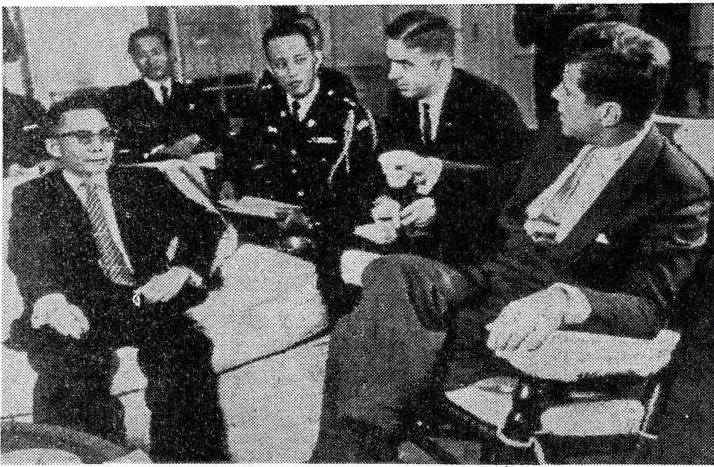

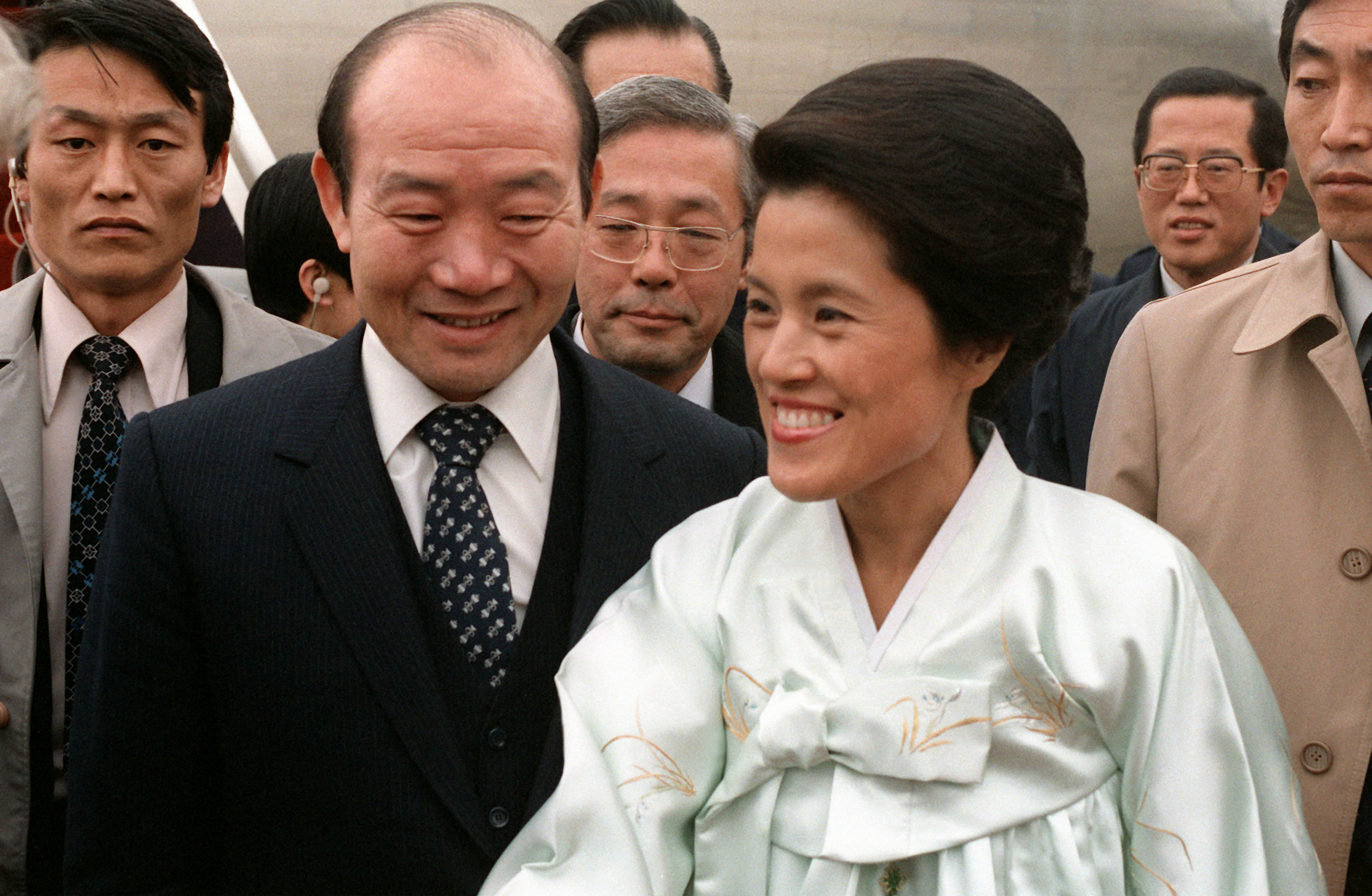

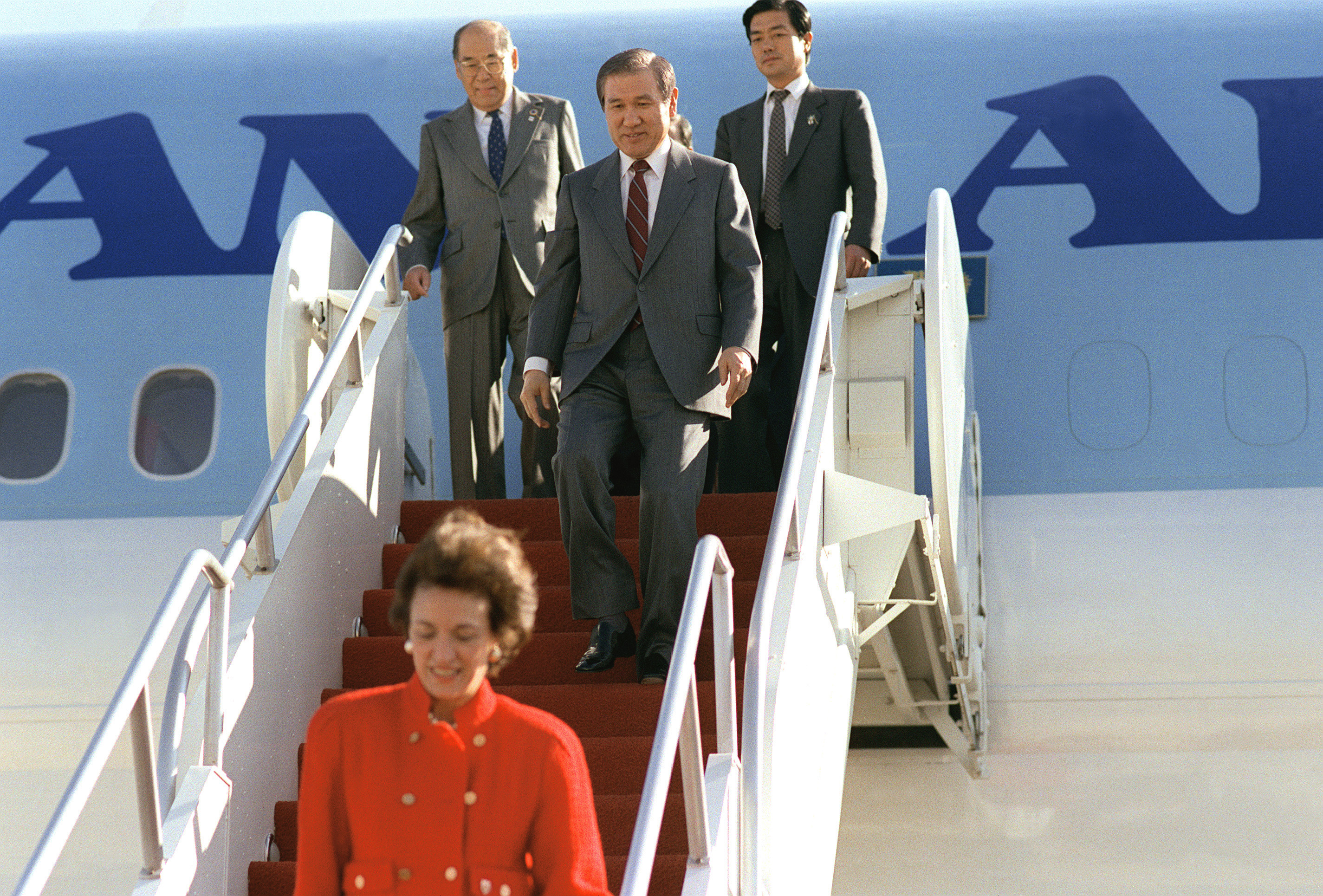

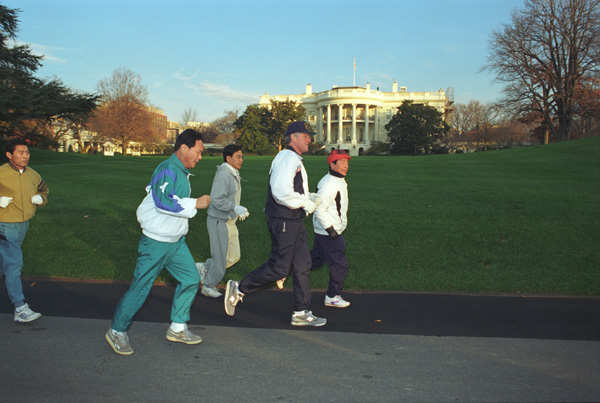

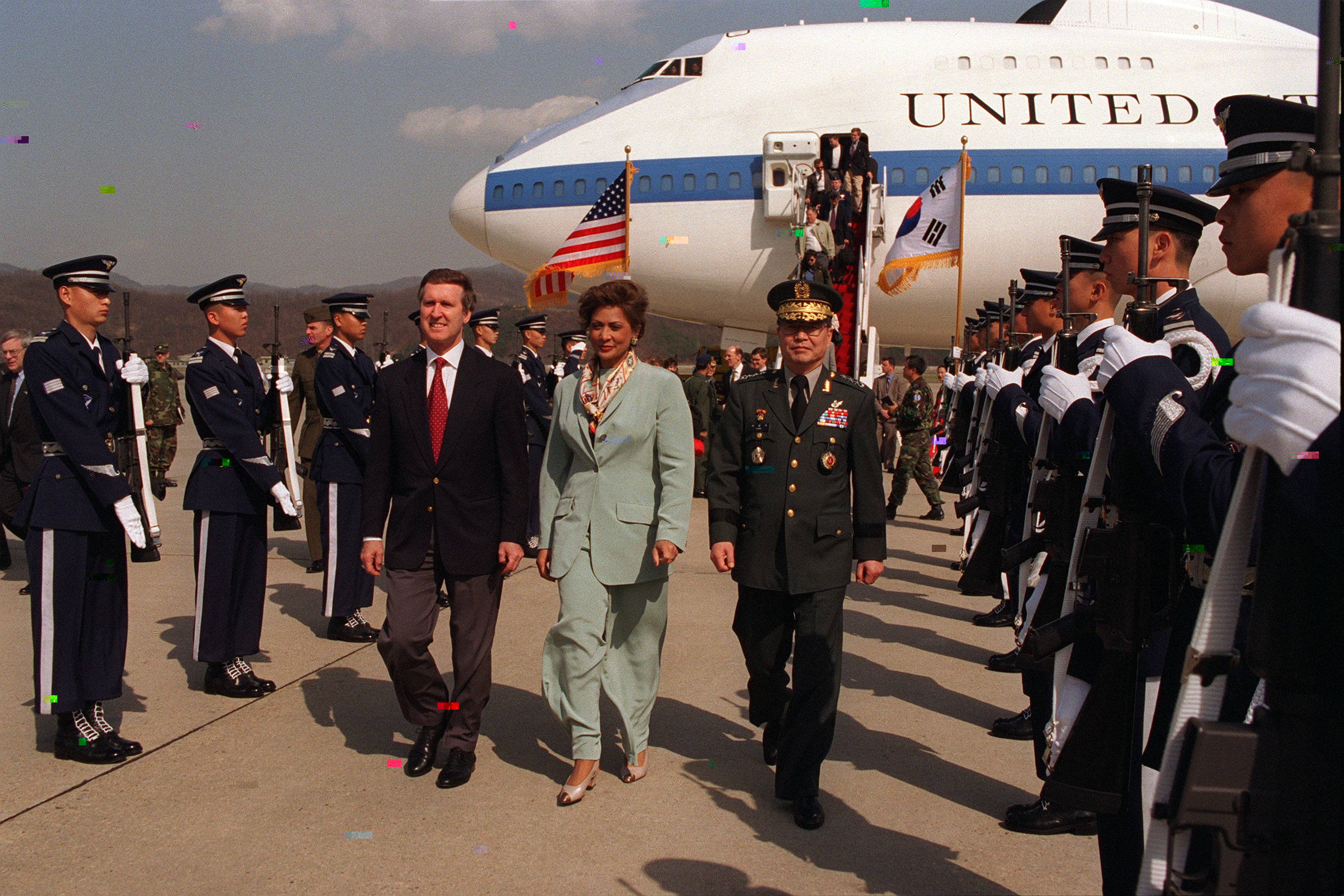

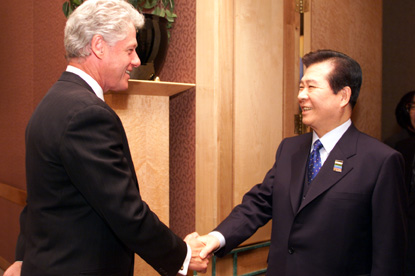

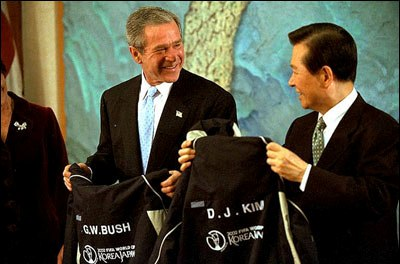

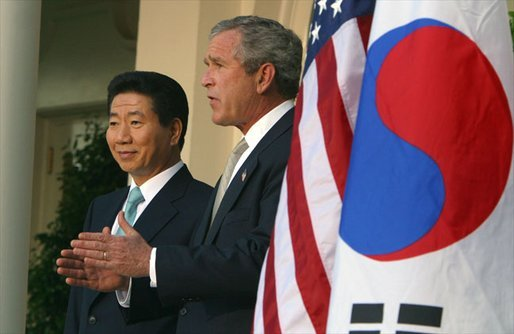

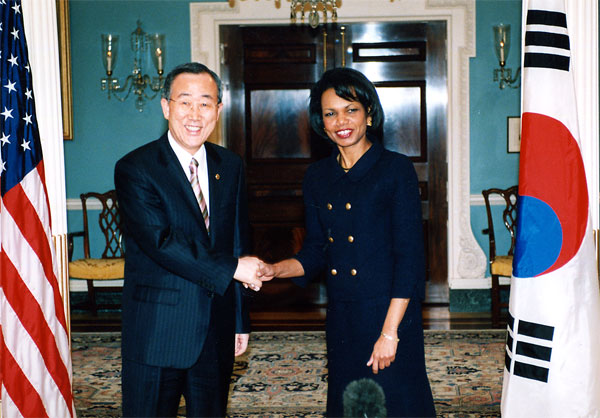

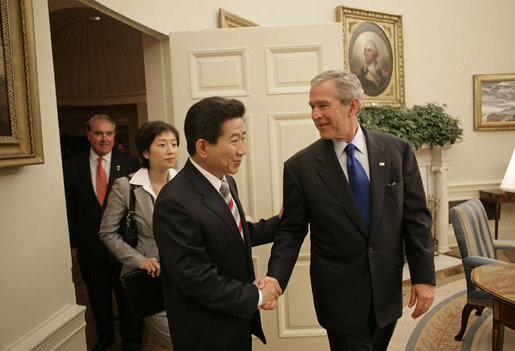

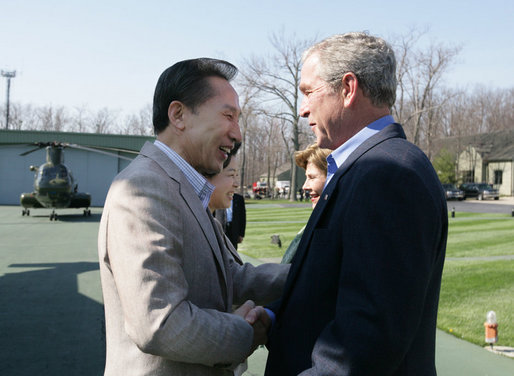

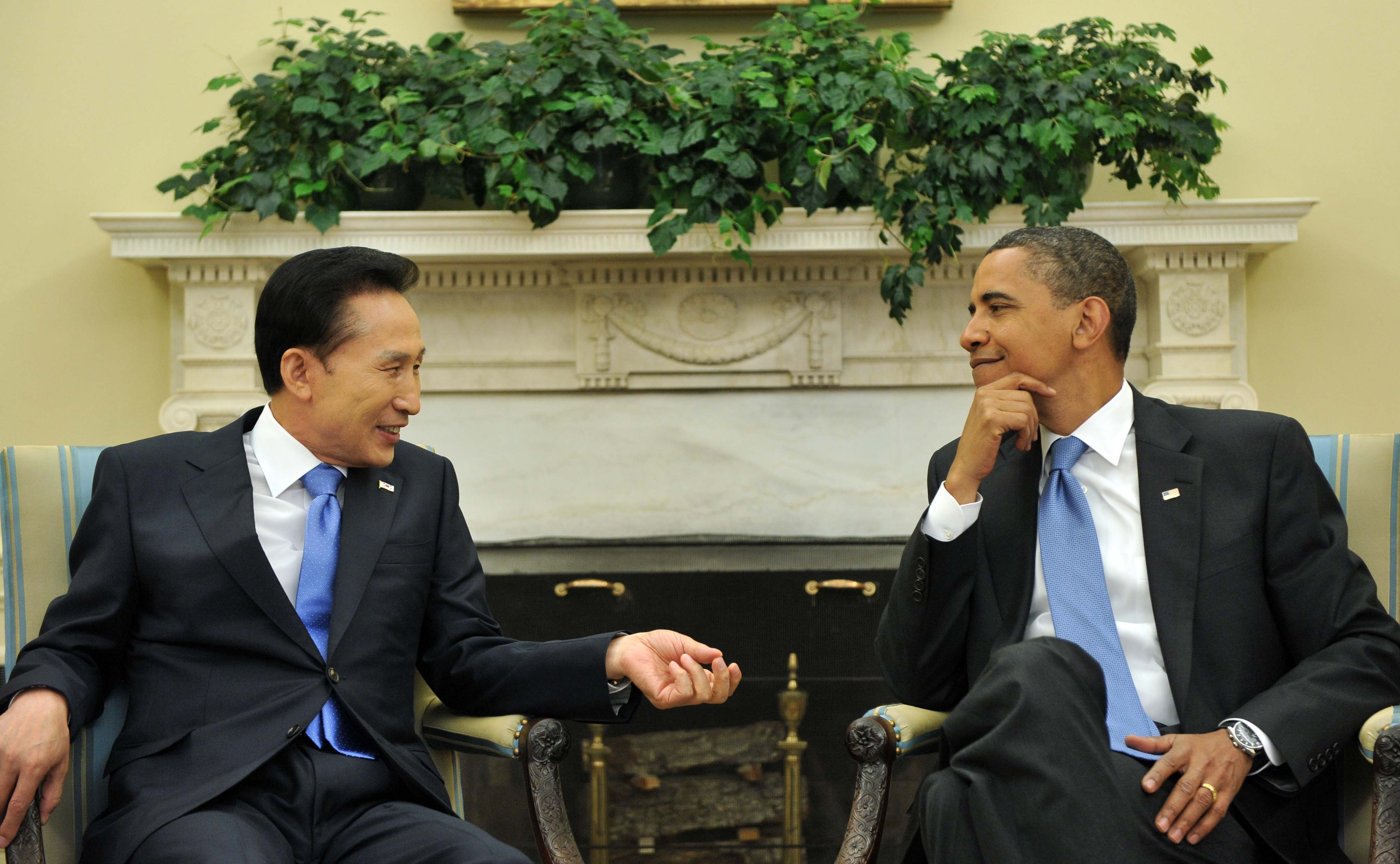

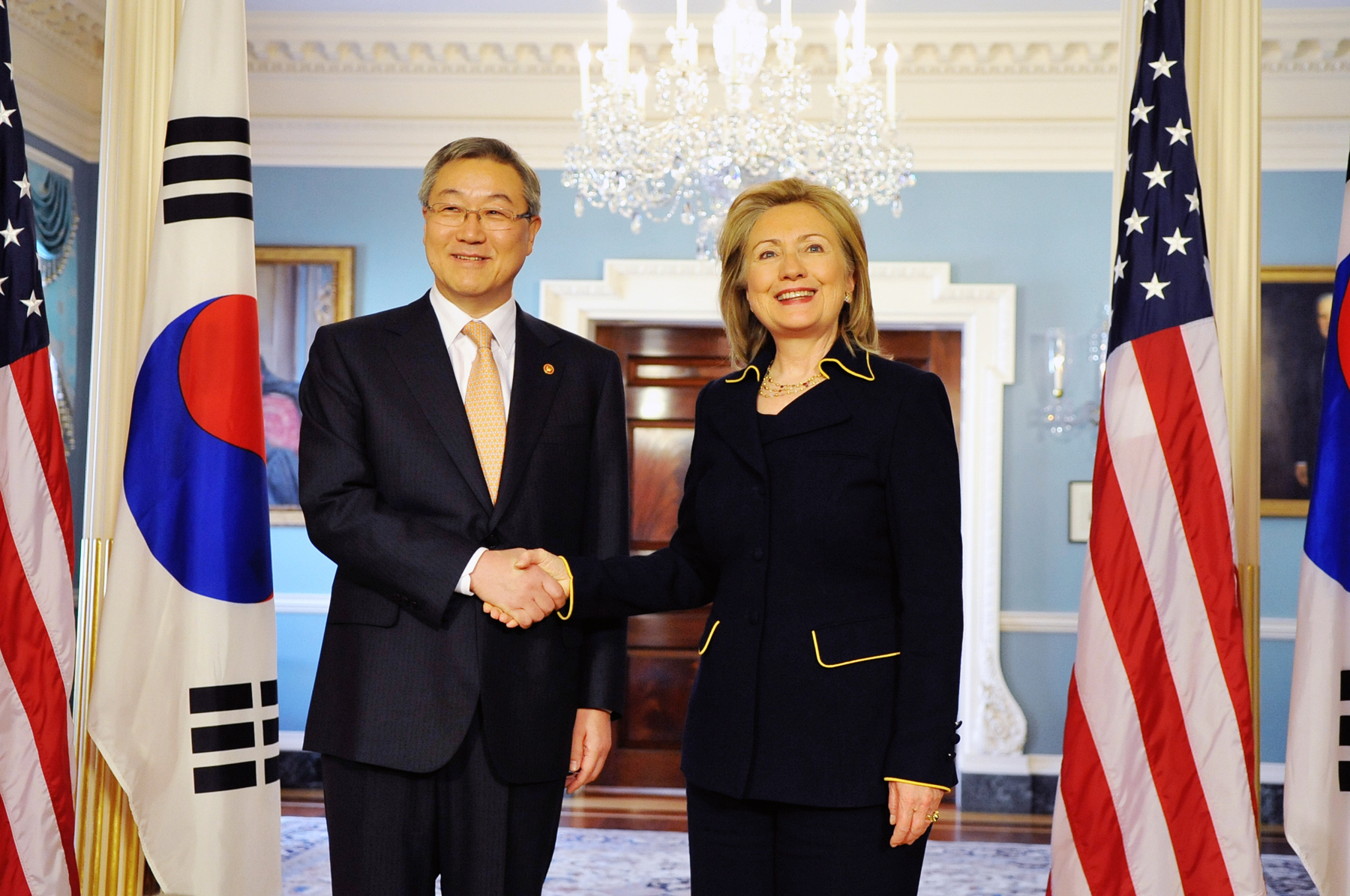

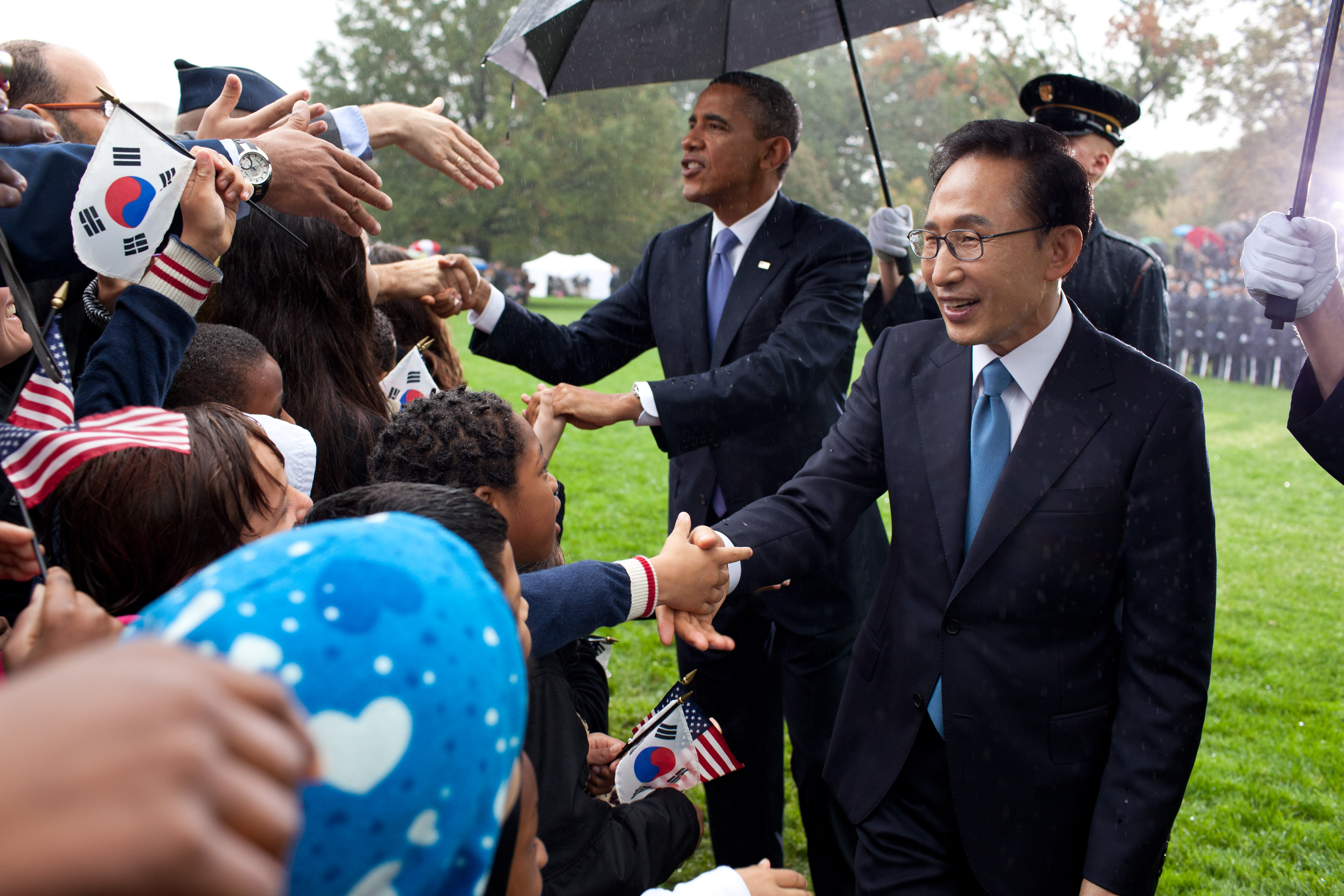

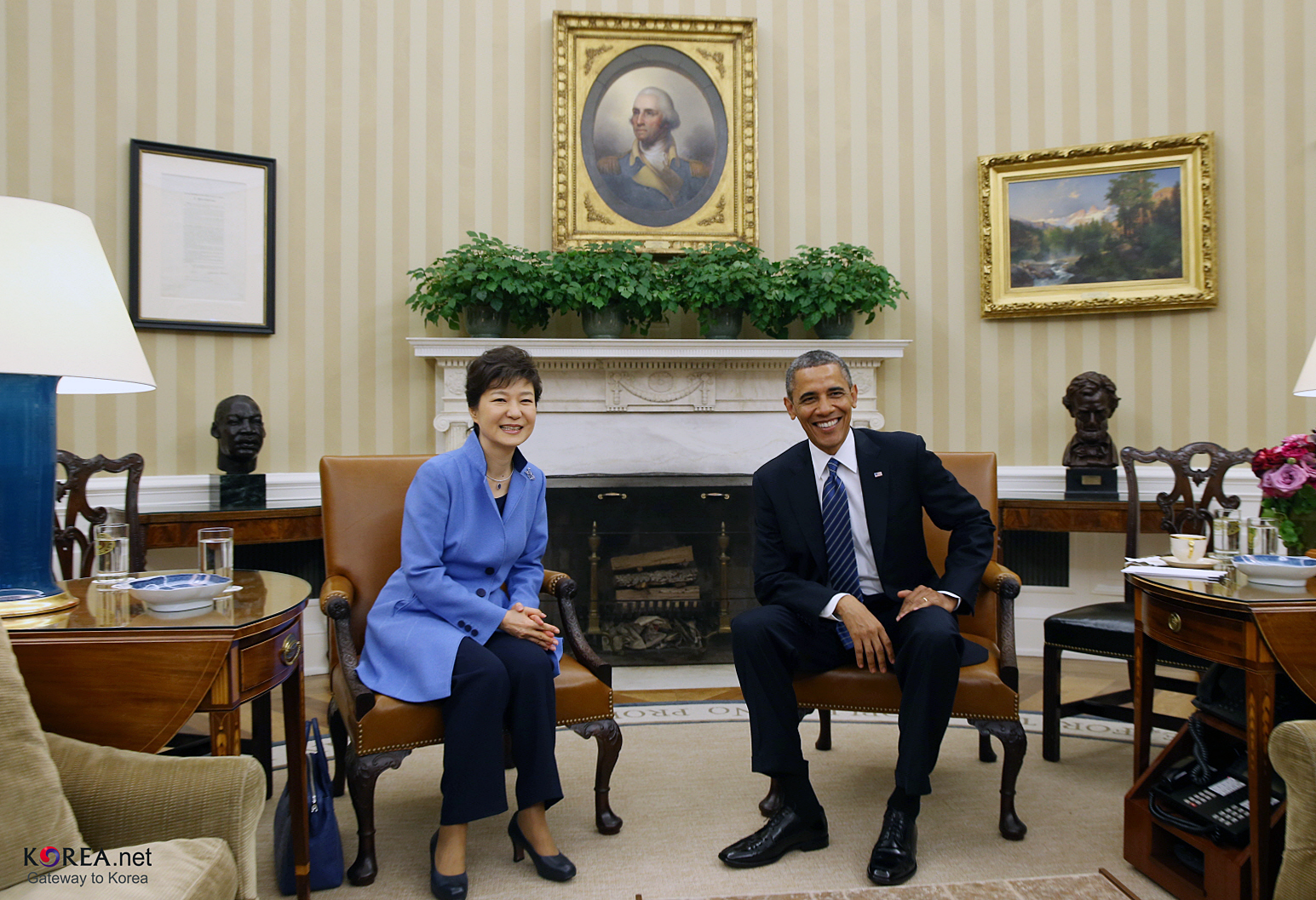

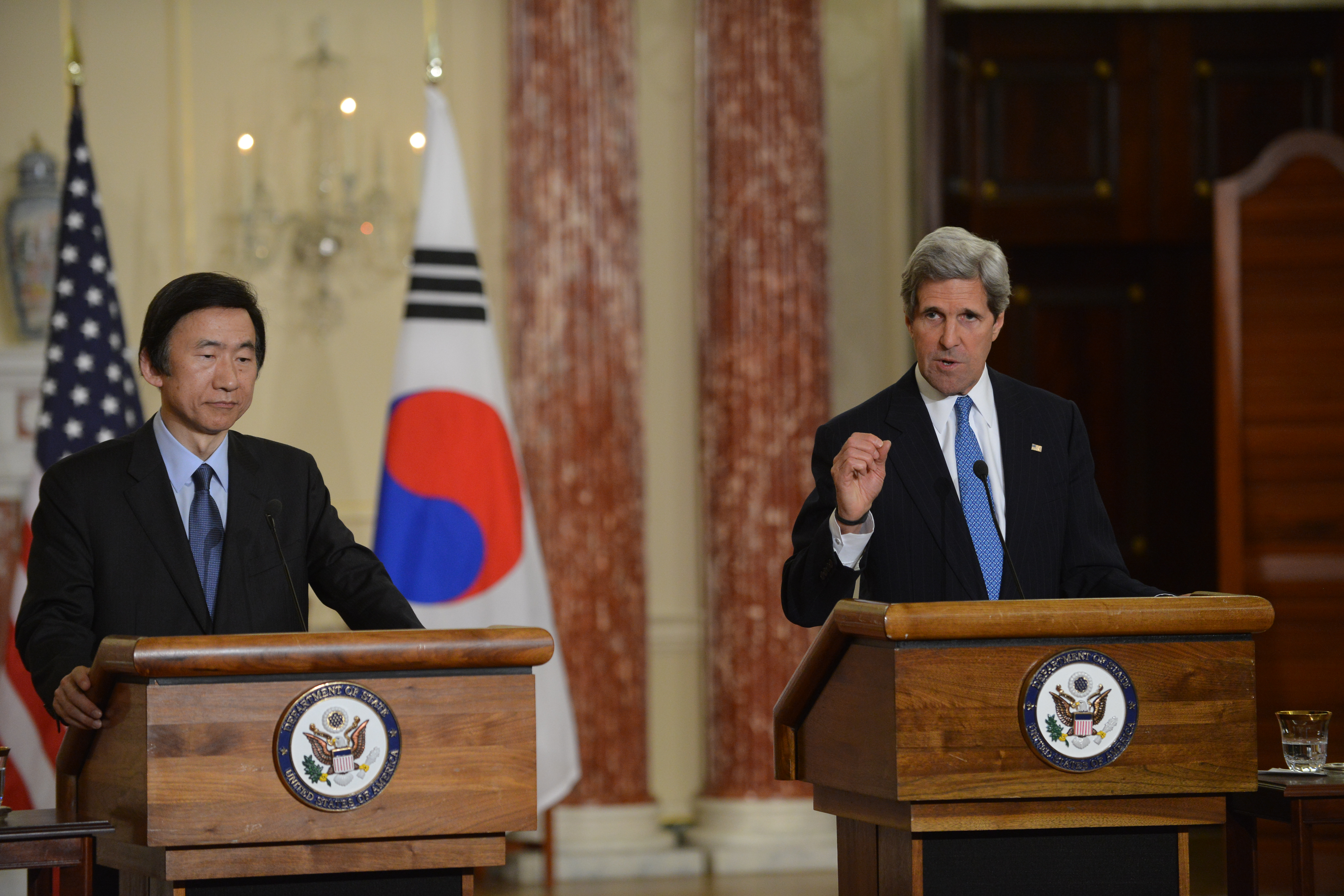

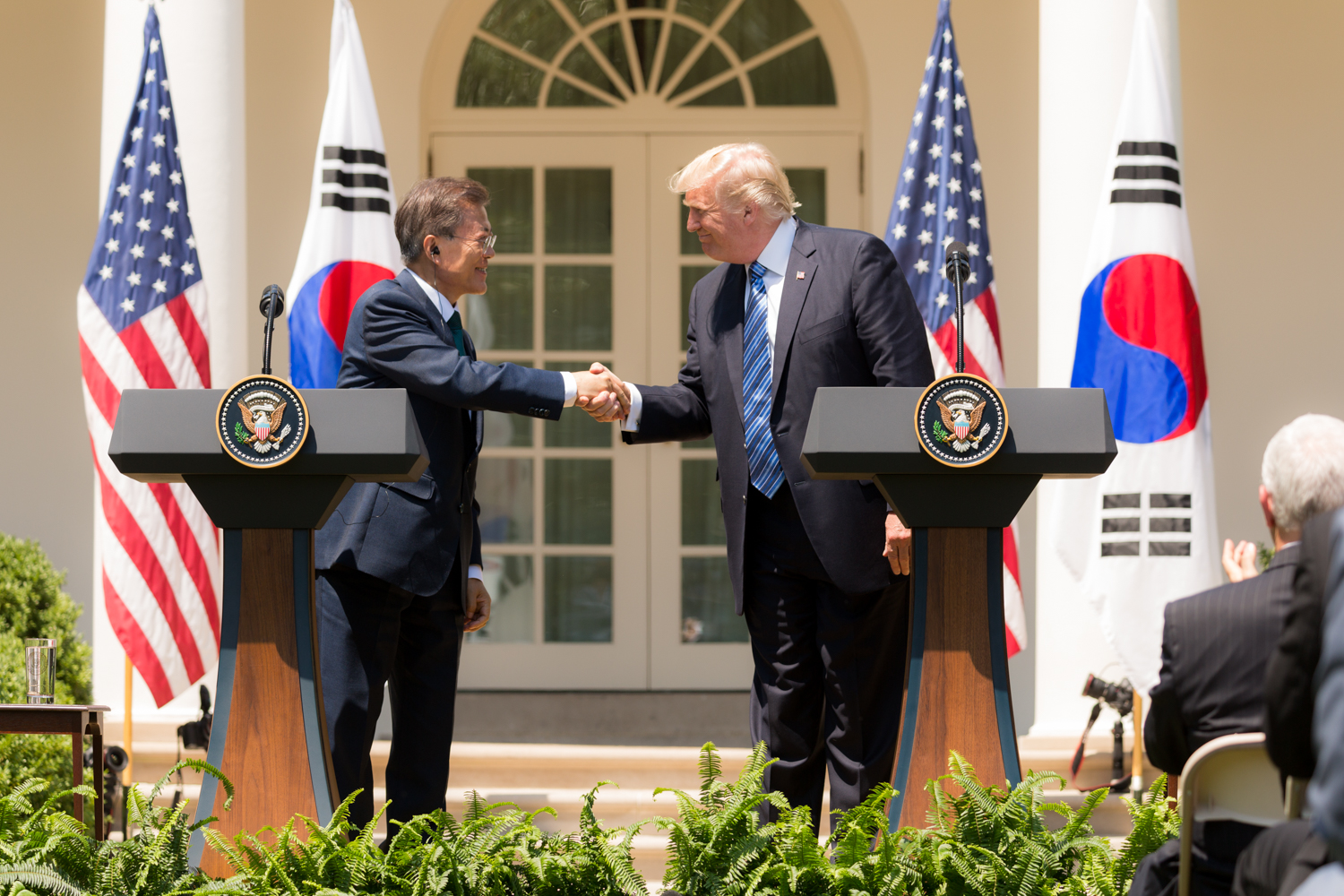

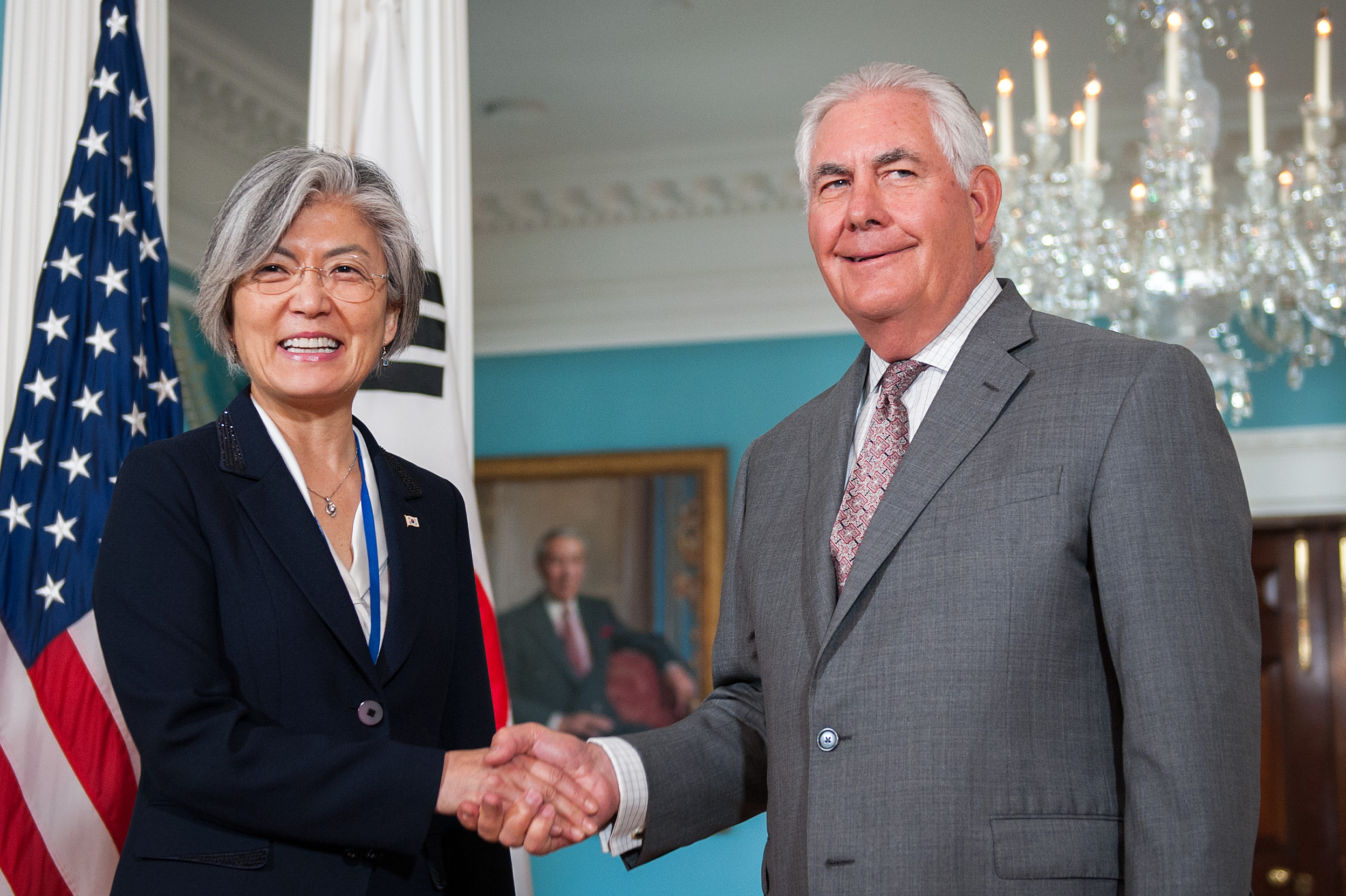

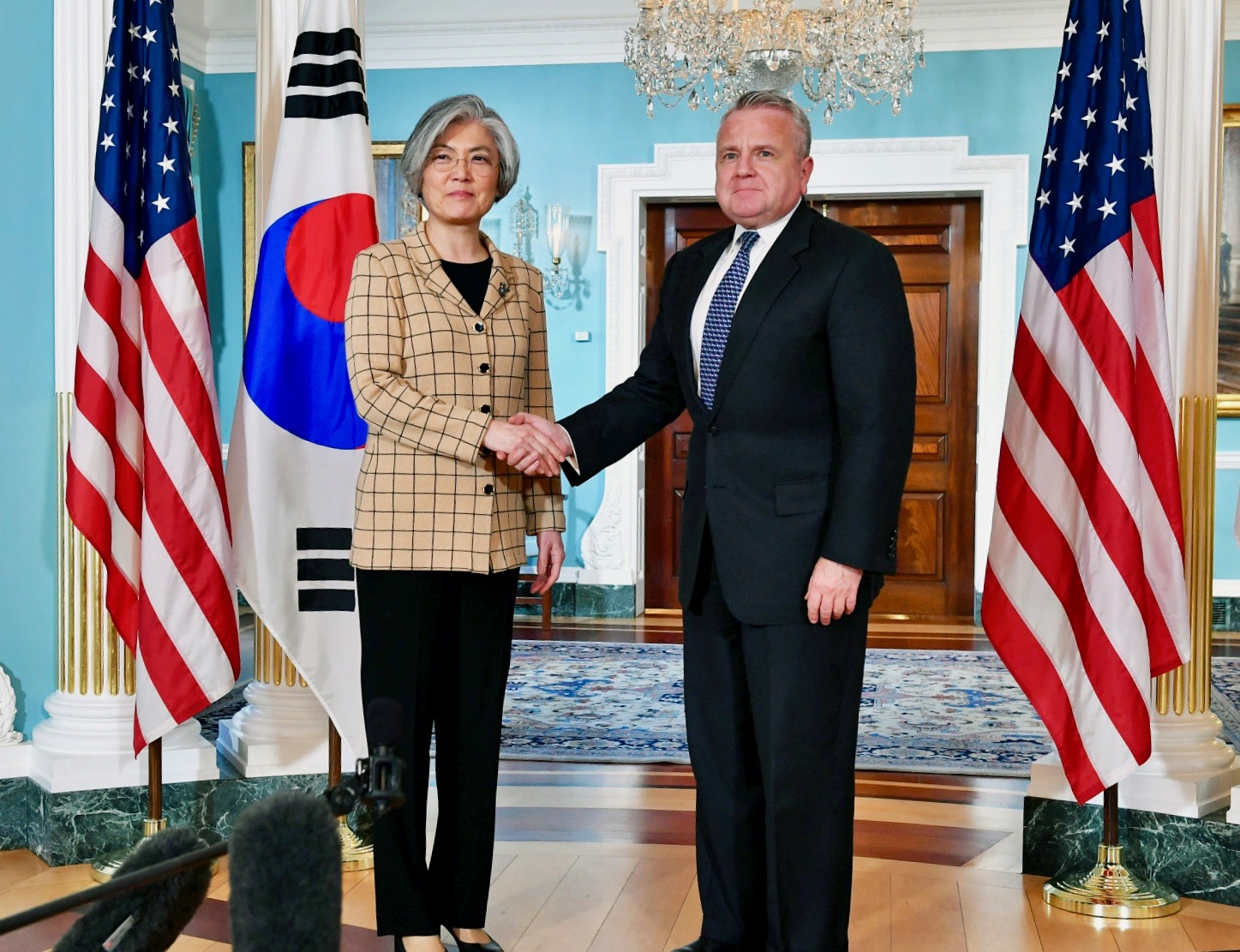

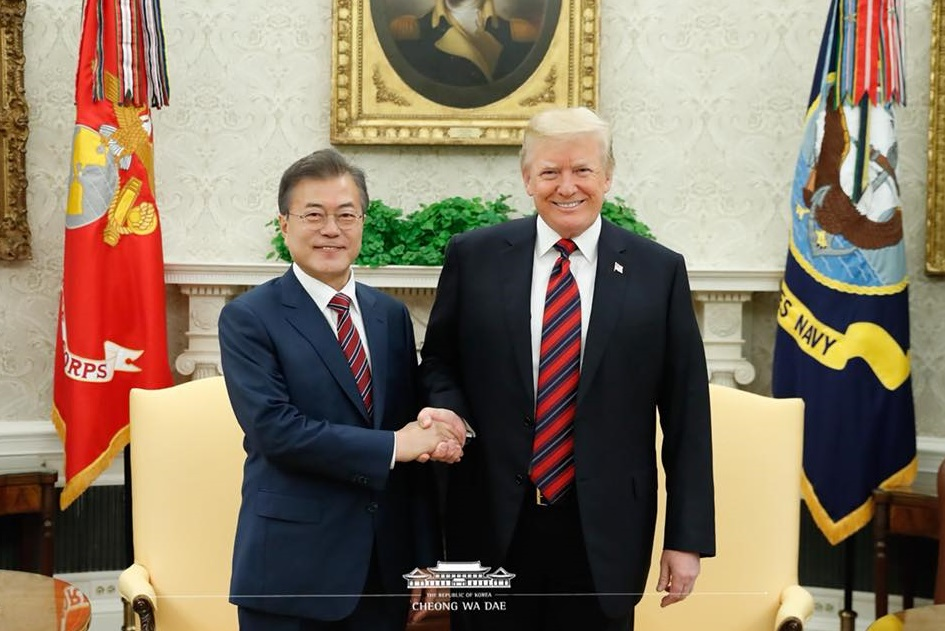

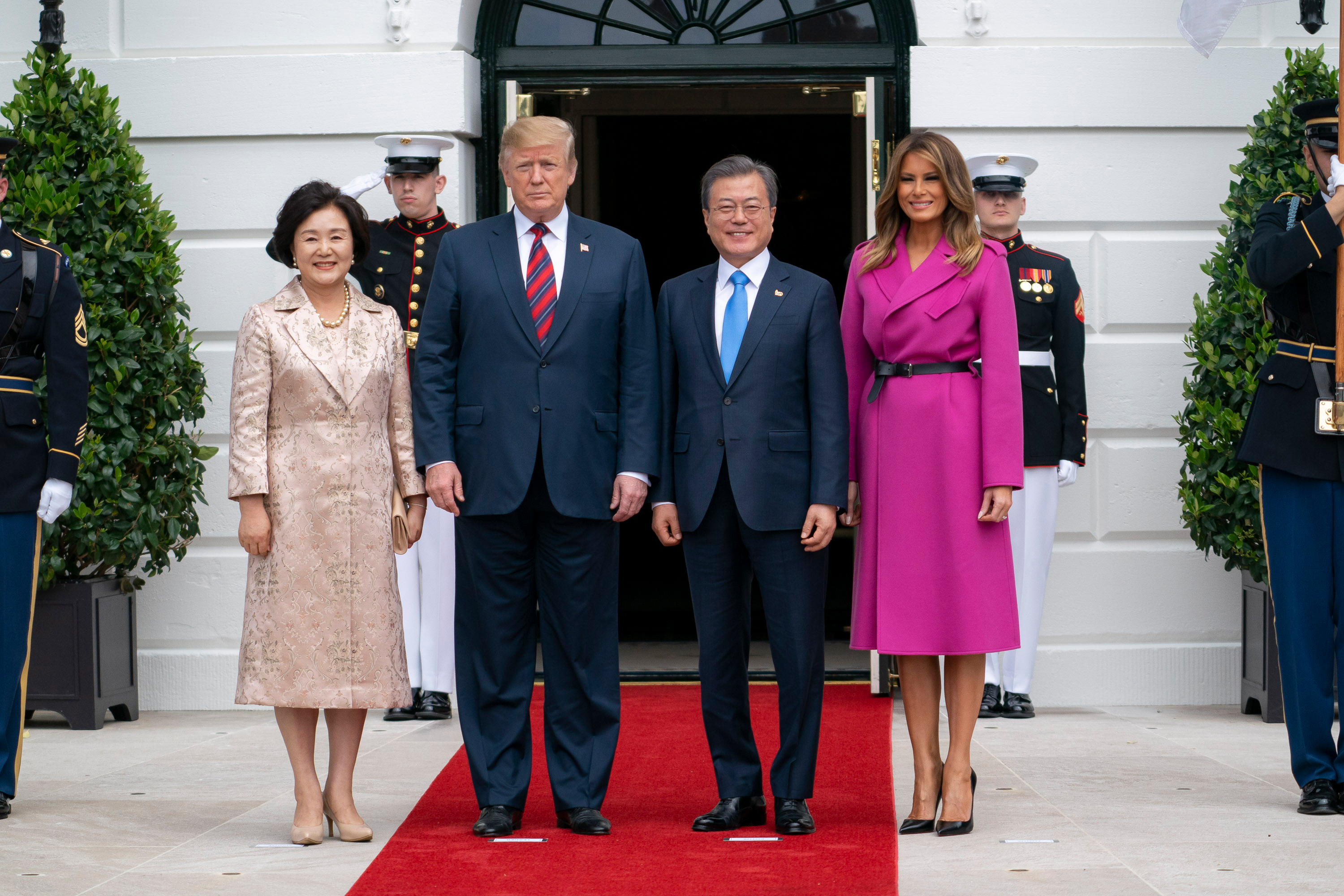

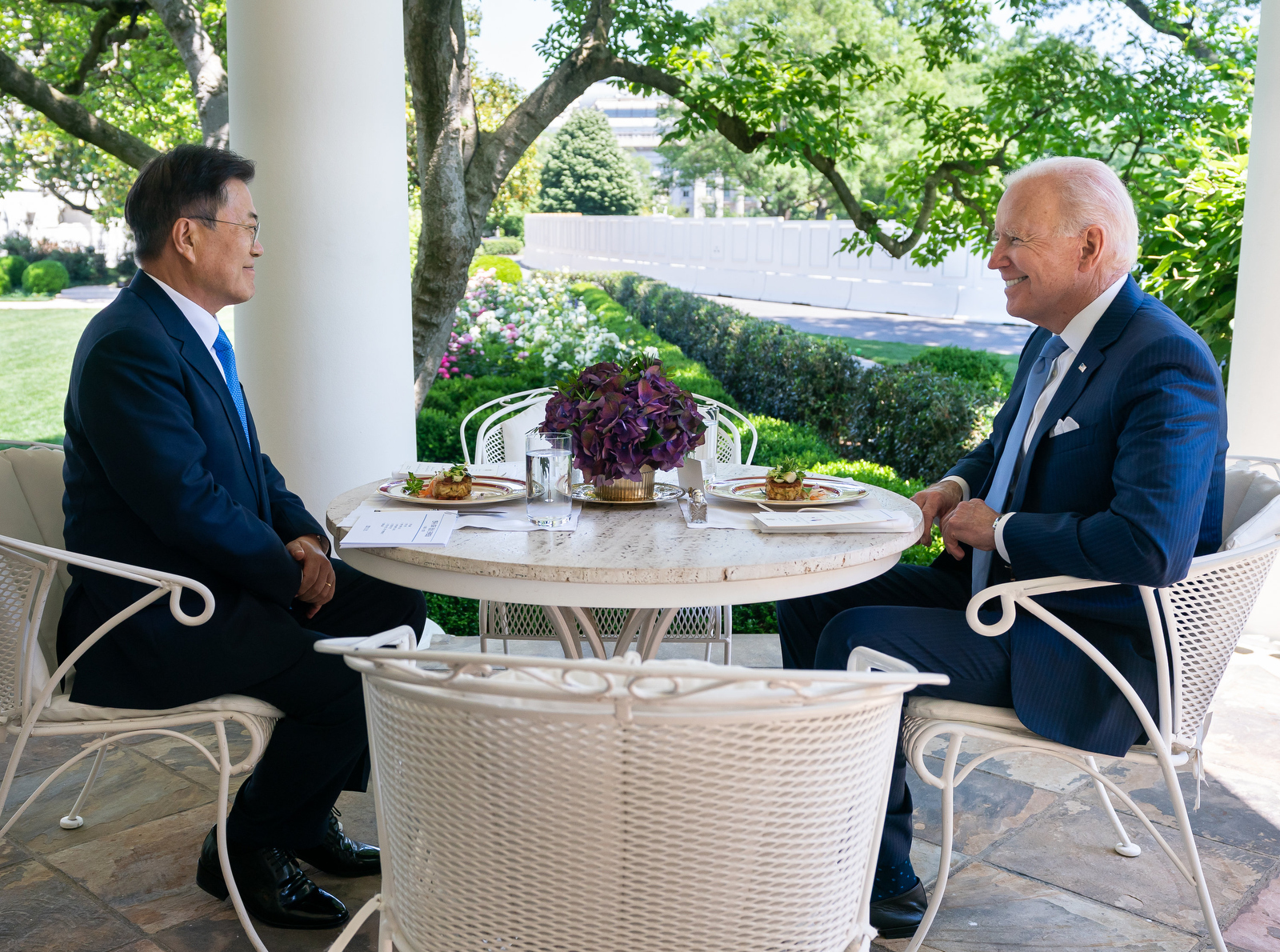

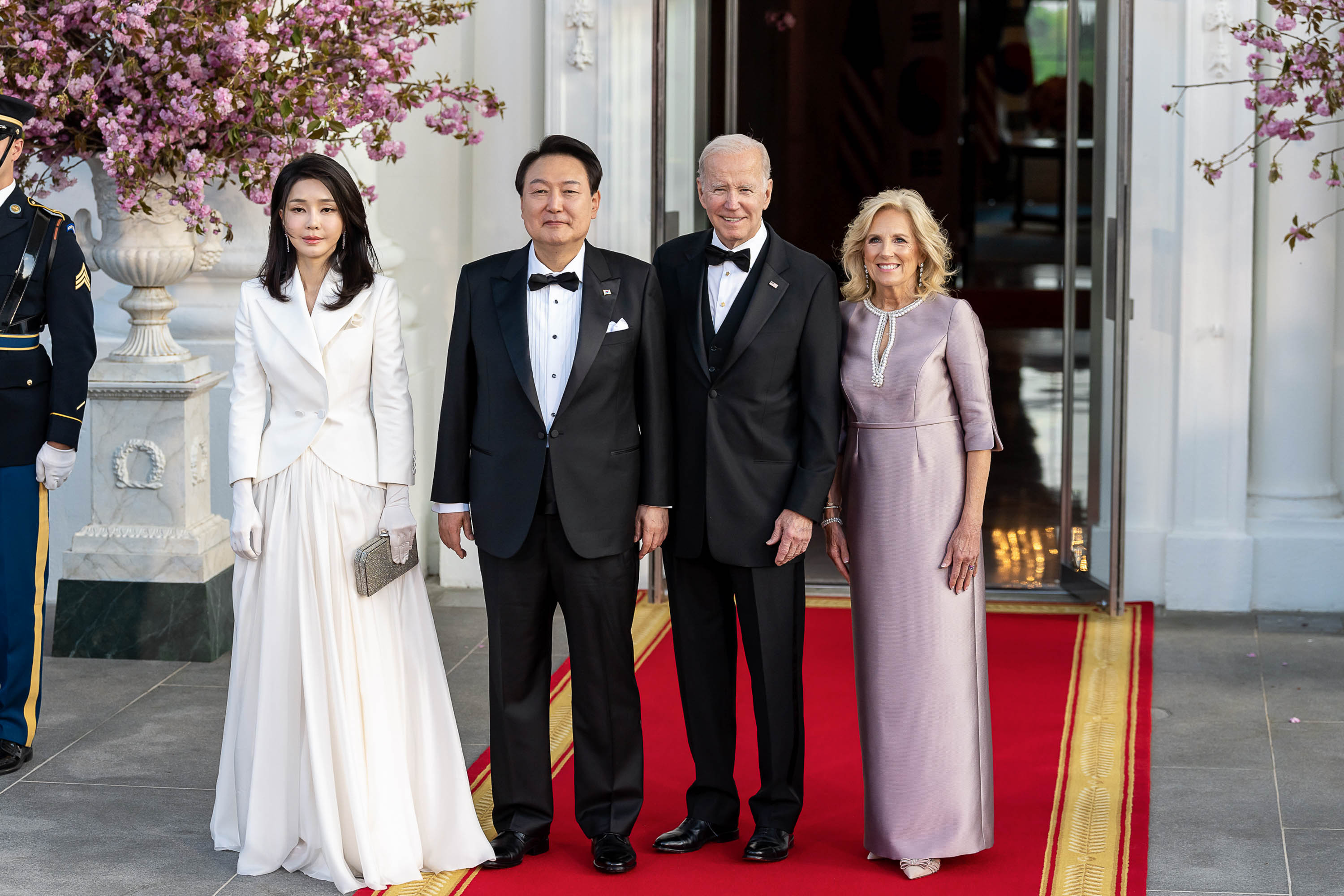

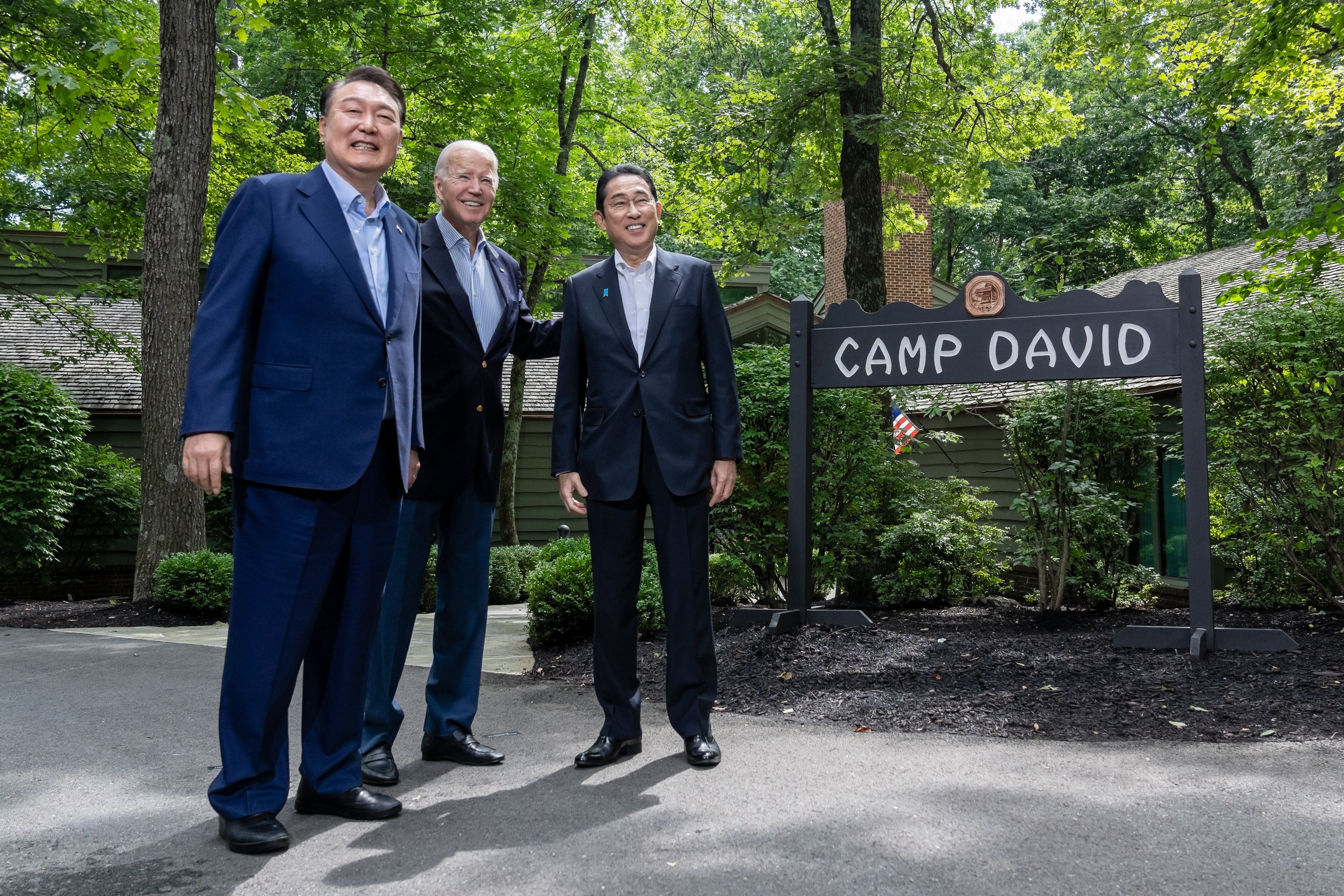

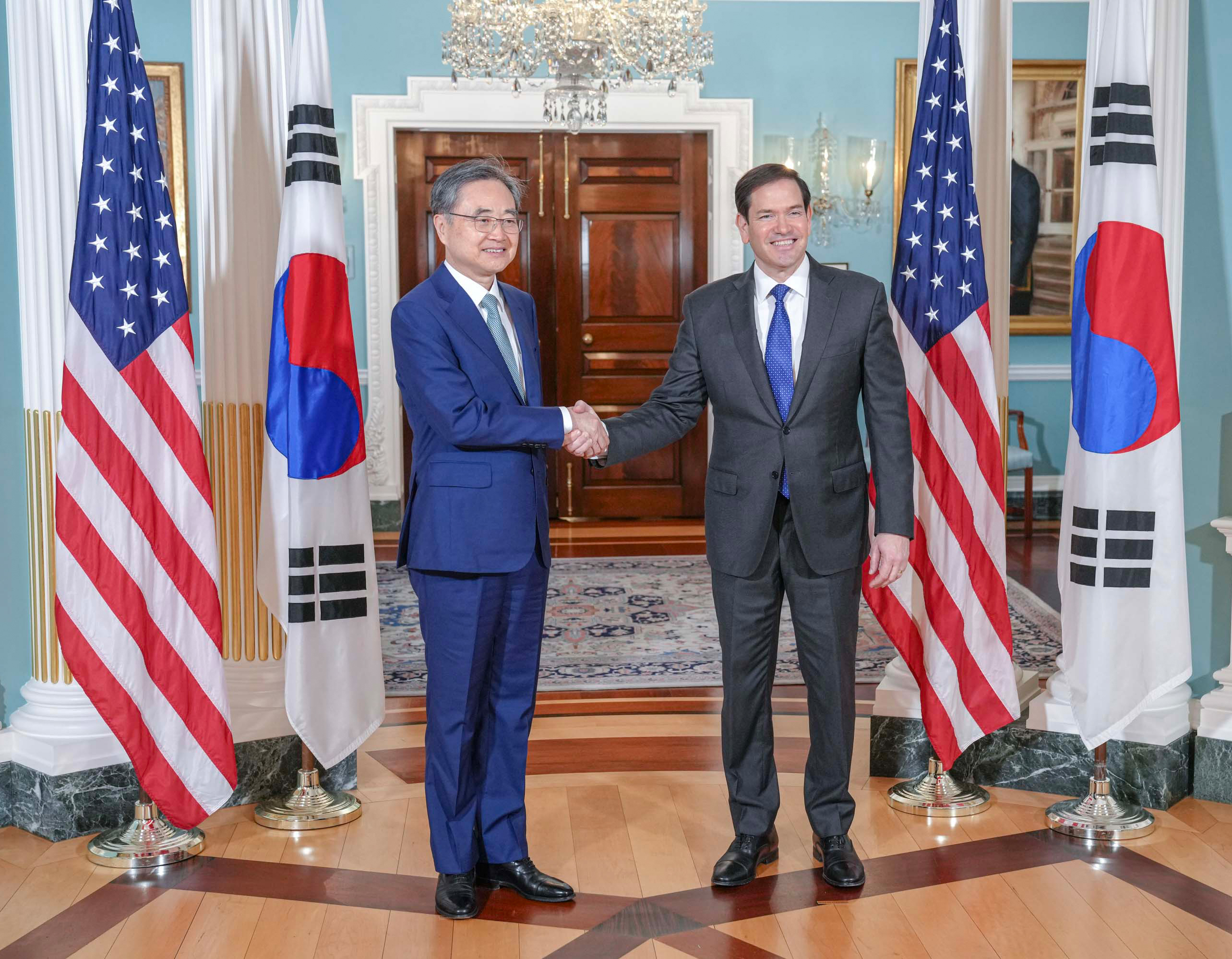

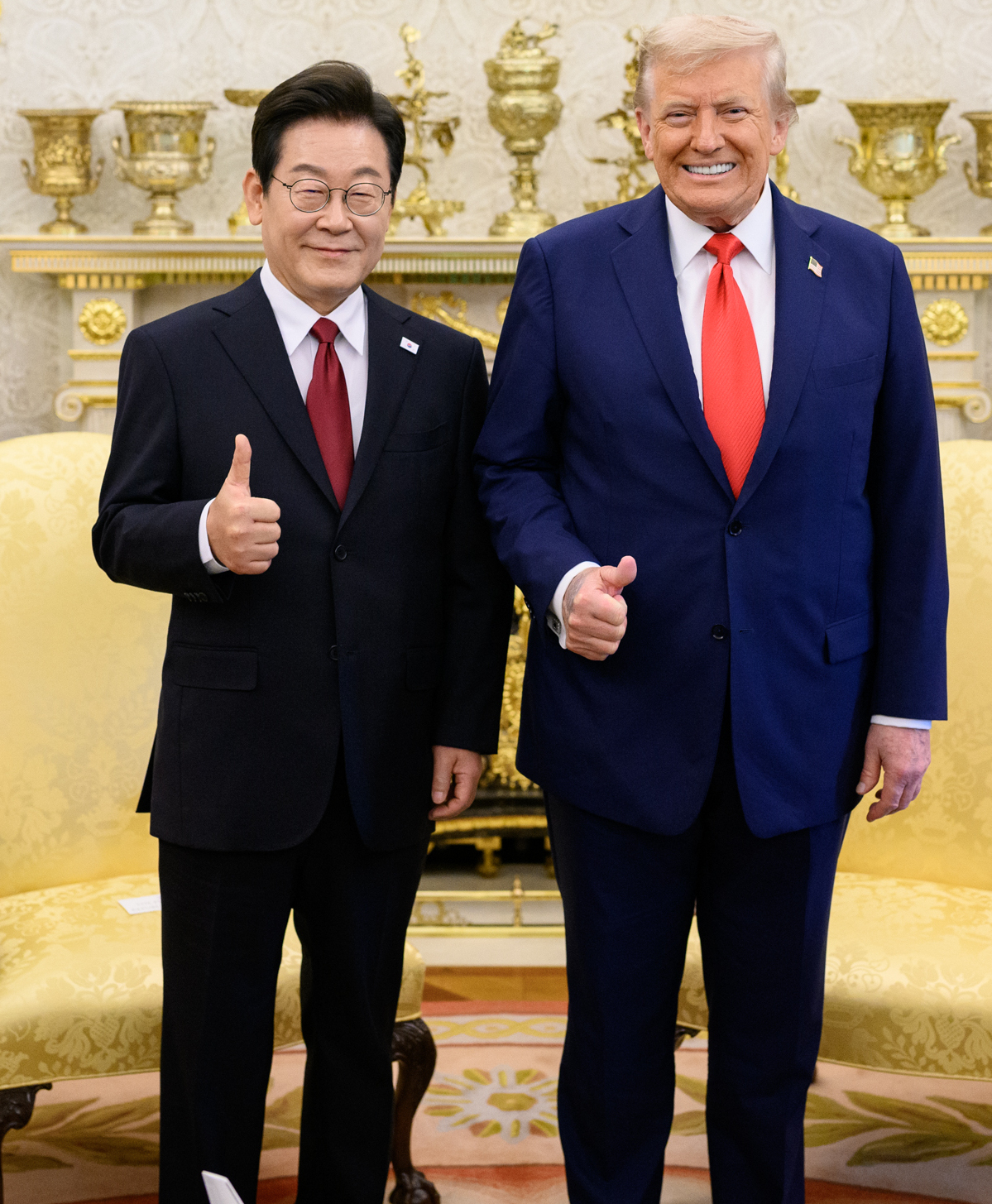

== Laos ==
Table of Trips
Start	End	Guest	Title	Reason
January 13, 1958	January 15, 1958	Souvanna Phouma	Prime Minister	Informal meetings with President Eisenhower and senior U.S.officials.
July 26, 1962	July 30, 1962	Souvanna Phouma	Prime Minister	Official visit. Later visited Philadelphia and New York City.Departed U.S.July 31.
February 25, 1963	February 27, 1963	Savang Vatthana	King	State visit. In U.S.February 21–27, visited Knoxville and New York City.
October 12, 1966	October 13, 1966	Souvanna Phouma	Prime Minister	Informal meetings with President Johnson in New York City.
October 20, 1967	October 21, 1967	Souvanna Phouma	Prime Minister	Informal visit. Arrived in U.S.October 10; visited New York City.
October 6, 1969	October 10, 1969	Souvanna Phouma	Prime Minister	Official visit. In U.S.October 3–11; visited New York City.
October 21, 1970	October 21, 1970	Souvanna Phouma	Prime Minister	Private visit.
August 30, 1971	30.Ag.1971	Souvanna Phouma	Prime Minister	Private visit to Washington Dulles International Airport while attending session of the UN General Assembly.
October 27, 1972	October 27, 1972	Souvanna Phouma	Prime Minister	Private visit.
February 16, 2016	February 18, 2016	Choummaly Sayasone	General Secretary of the Lao People's Revolutionary Party; President	Attended the ASEAN Leaders Summit at Sunnylands, California.
May 12, 2022	May 13, 2022	Phankham Viphavanh	Prime Minister	Attended the U.S.-ASEAN Summit.

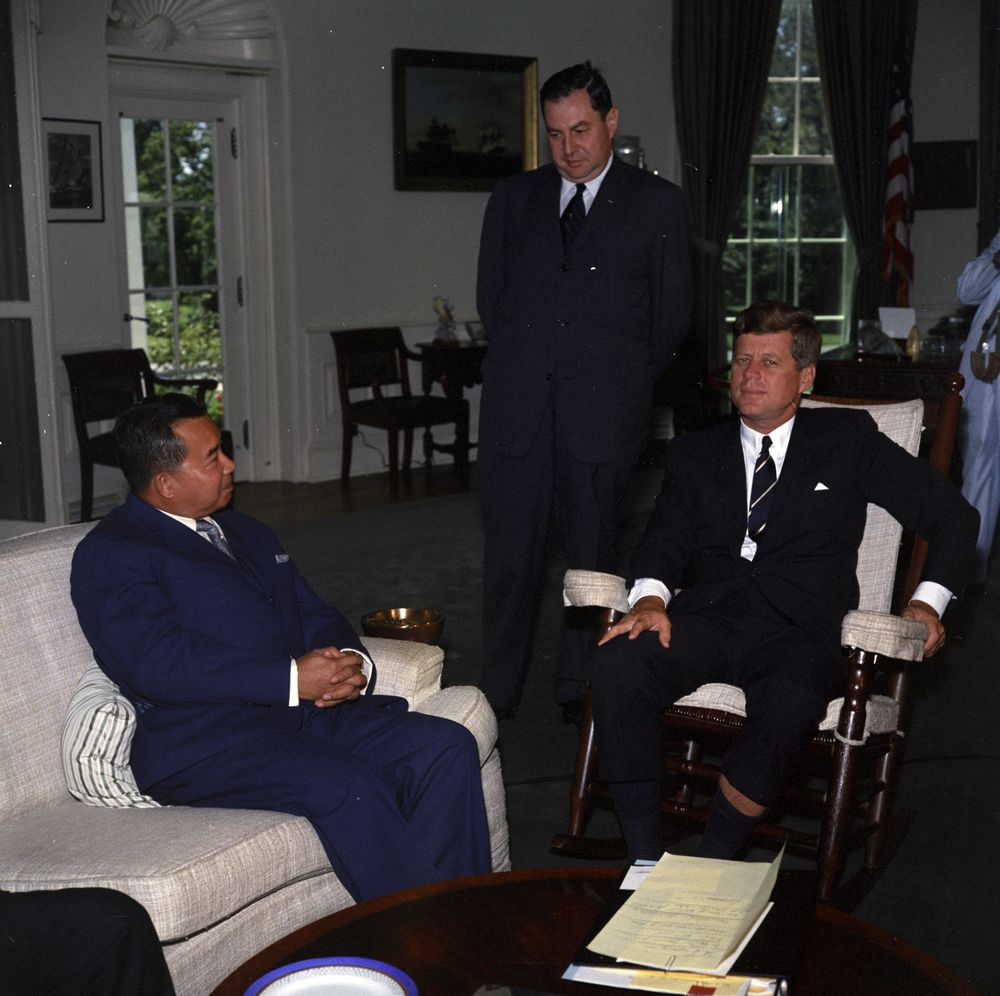

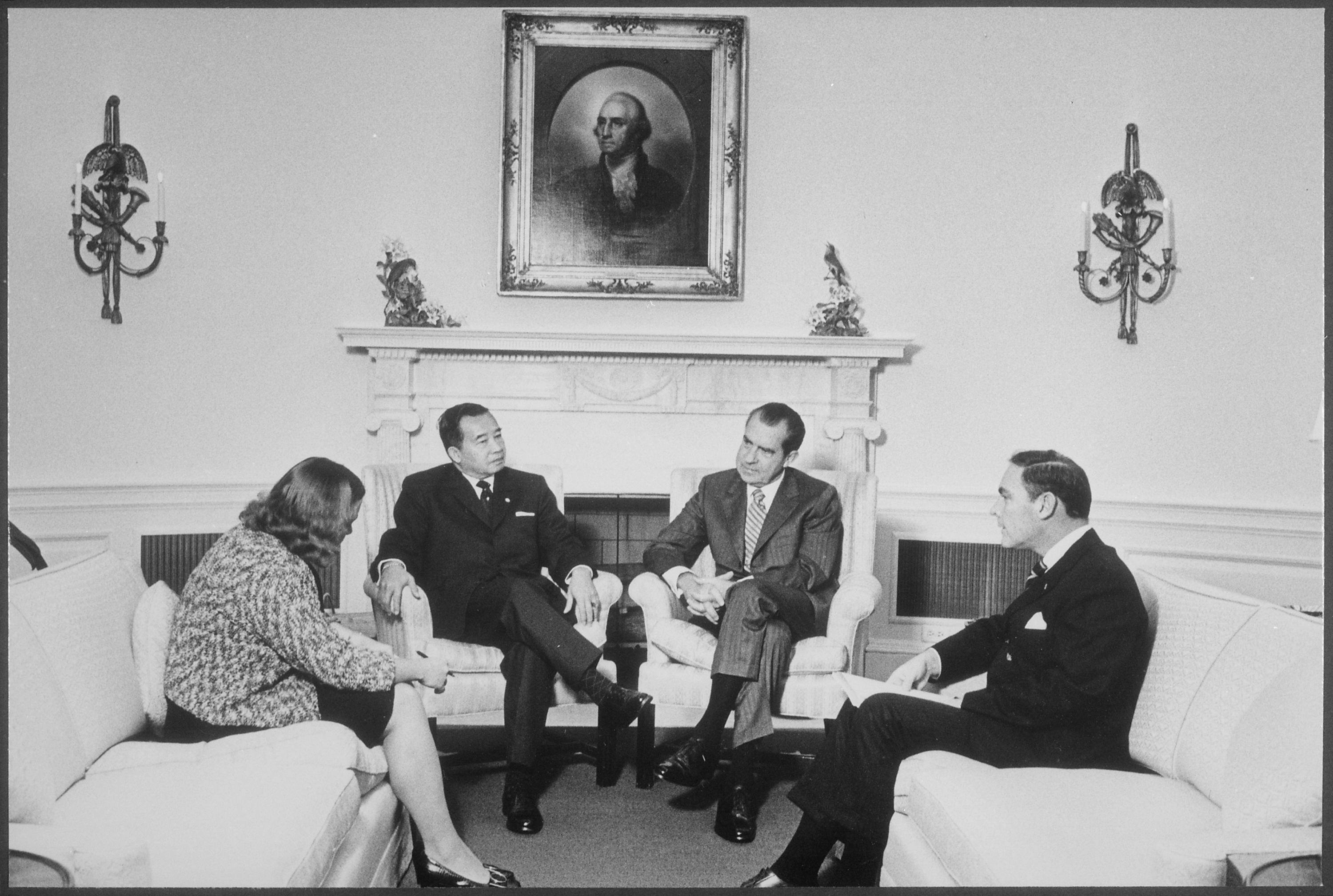

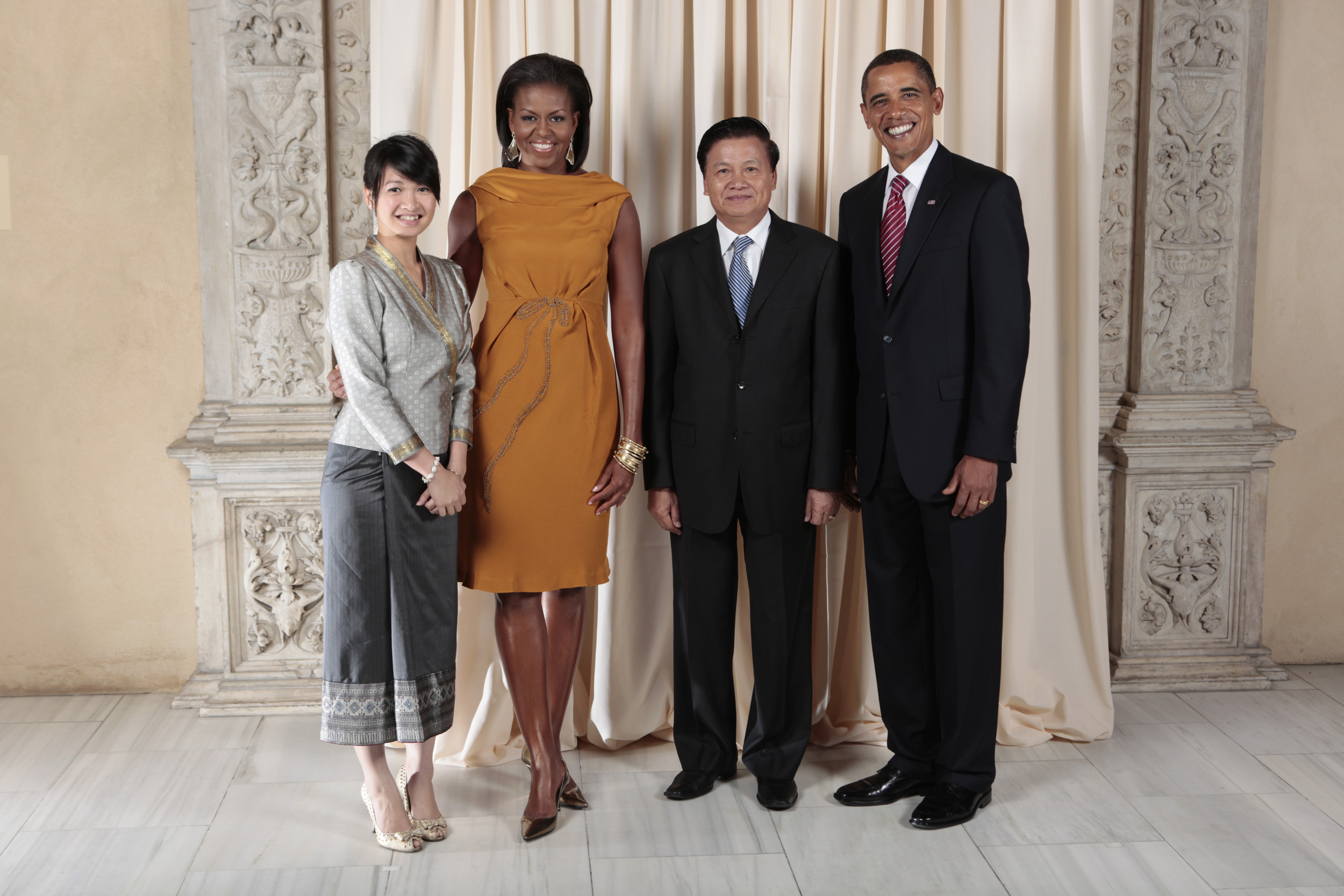

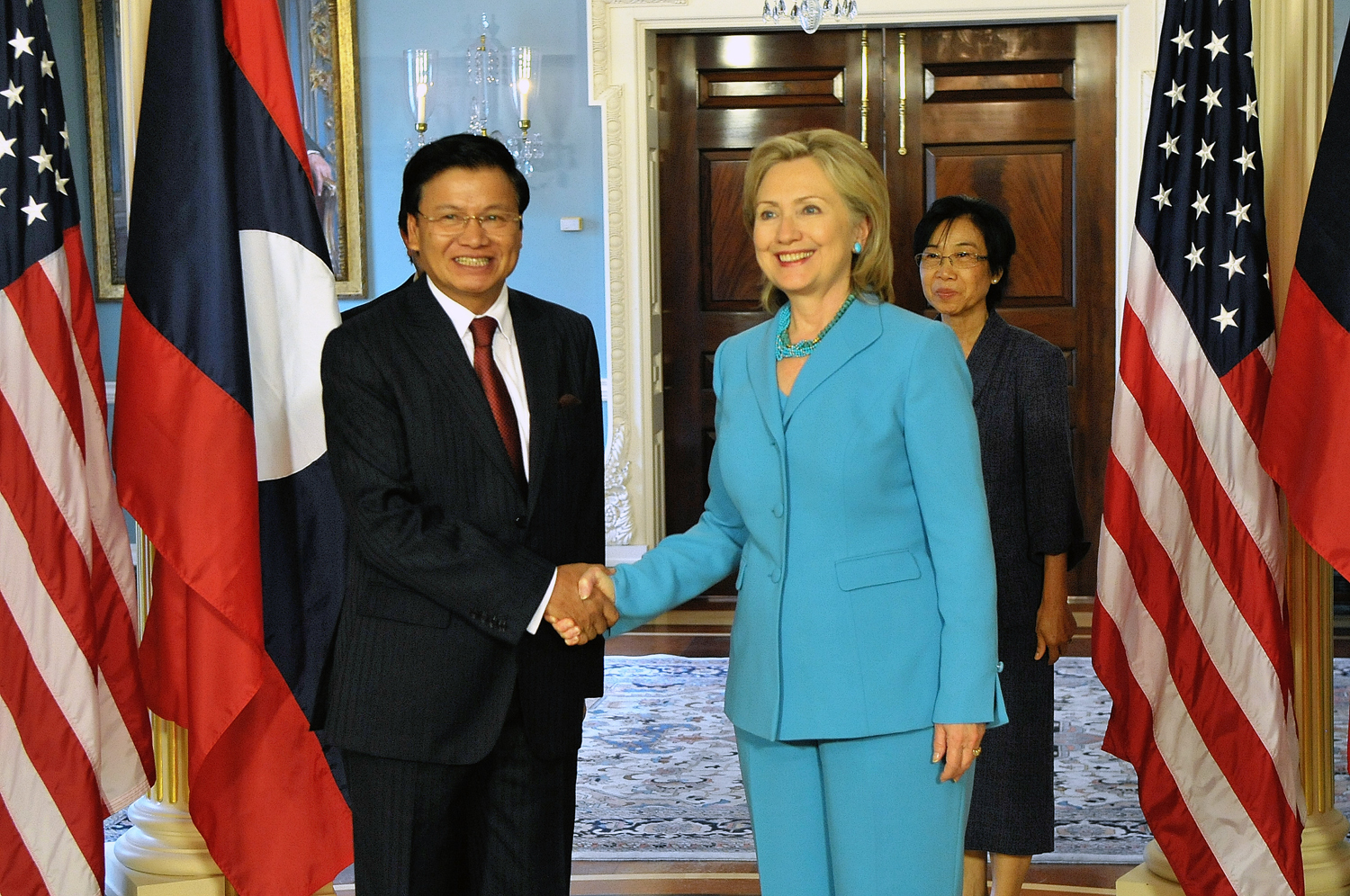

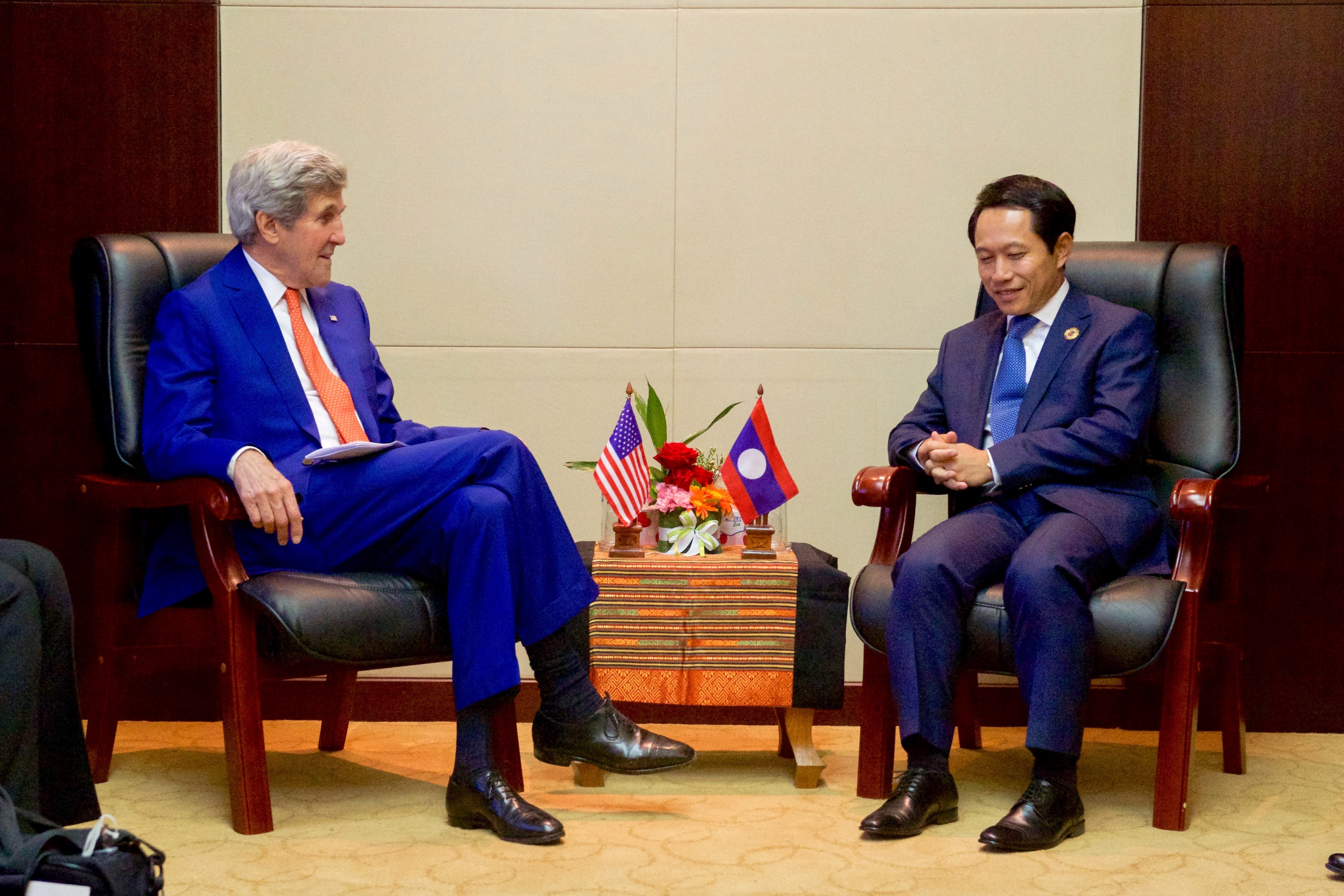

== Lebanon ==
Table of Trips
Start	End	Guest	Title	Reason
July 22, 1960	July 22, 1960	Saeb Salam	Prime Minister	Met with President Eisenhower in New York City while attending UN General Assembly session.
October 17, 1982	October 19, 1982	Amine Gemayel	President	Official working visit. Addressed UN October 18.
July 19, 1983	July 23, 1983	Amine Gemayel	President	Official working visit. Private visit to Houston afterward.
November 30, 1983	December 3, 1983	Amine Gemayel	President	Official working visit.
August 29, 1990	August 29, 1990	Selim Hoss	Prime Minister	Met with President Bush at the UN General Assembly.
August 24, 1991	August 24, 1991	Elias Hrawi	President	Met with President Bush at the UN General Assembly.
August 27, 1993	August 27, 1993	Rafiq al-Hariri	Prime Minister	Met with President Clinton at the UN General Assembly in New York City.
April 25, 1996	April 25, 1996	Elias Hrawi	President	Met with President Clinton during a private visit. Addressed the UN General Assembly April 23; medical treatment in Boston April 28.
October 16, 1996	October 19, 1996	Rafiq al-Hariri	Prime Minister	Met with President Clinton during a private visit.
June 15, 1998	June 18, 1998	Rafiq al-Hariri	Prime Minister	Met with President Clinton during a private visit.
April 23, 2001	April 26, 2001	Rafiq al-Hariri	Prime Minister	Working visit.
April 15, 2002	April 18, 2002	Rafiq al-Hariri	Prime Minister	Working visit.
November 17, 2002	November 19, 2002	Rafiq al-Hariri	Prime Minister	Working visit.
November 17, 2006	November 20, 2006	Fouad Siniora	Prime Minister	Working visit.
September 24, 2008	September 25, 2008	Michel Suleiman	President	Working visit.
May 24, 2010	May 24, 2010	Saad Hariri	Prime Minister	Working visit.
January 12, 2011	January 12, 2011	Saad Hariri	Prime Minister	Working visit.
September 25, 2013	September 25, 2013	Michel Suleiman	President	Met with President Obama at the UN General Assembly in New York City.
July 25, 2017	July 25, 2017	Saad Hariri	Prime Minister	Official Working Visit.
July 21, 2026	July 21, 2026	Joseph Aoun	President	Working Visit.

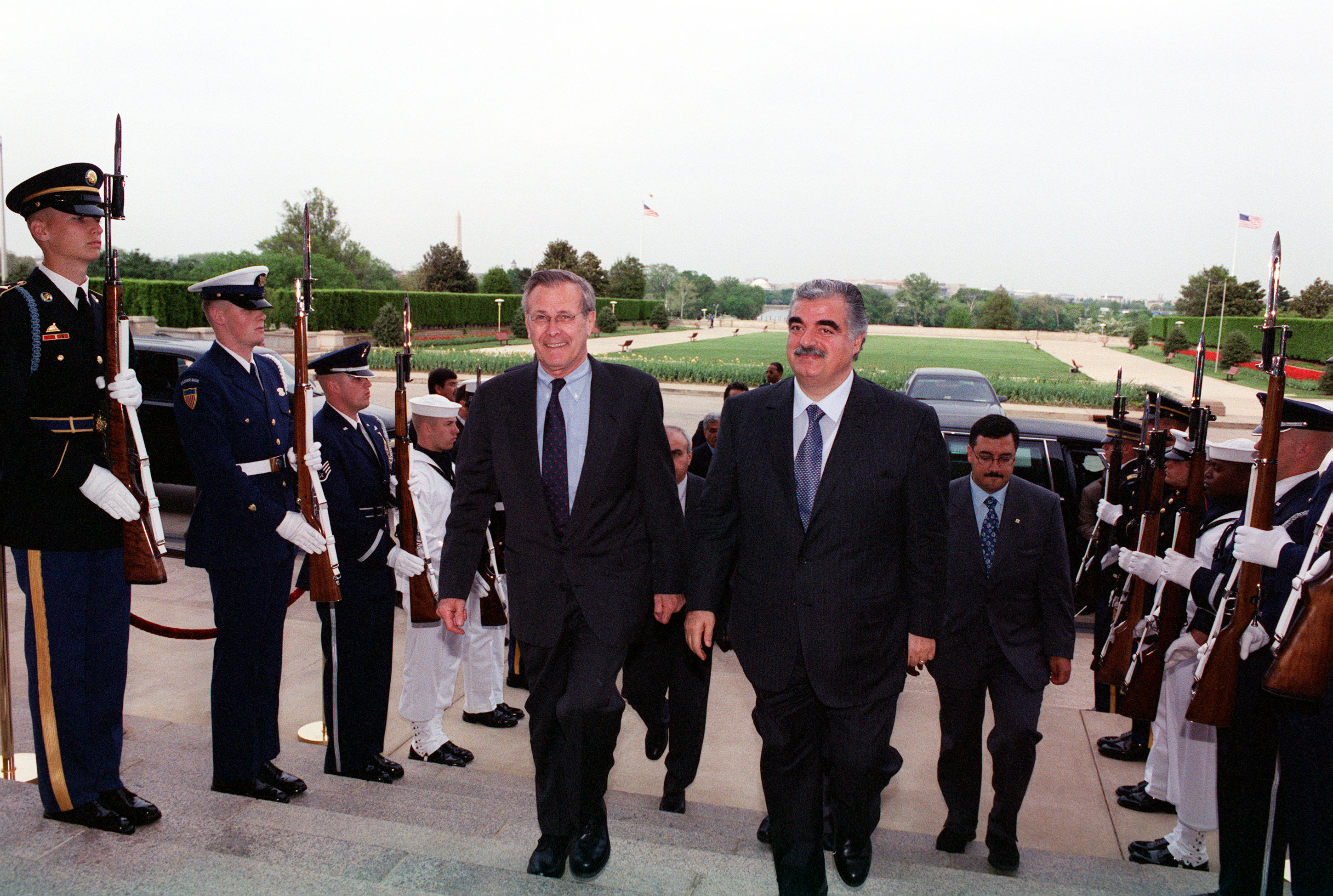

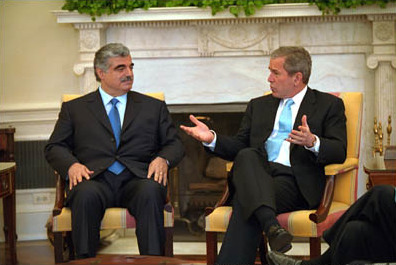

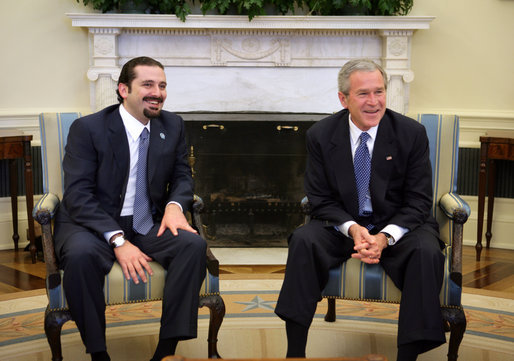

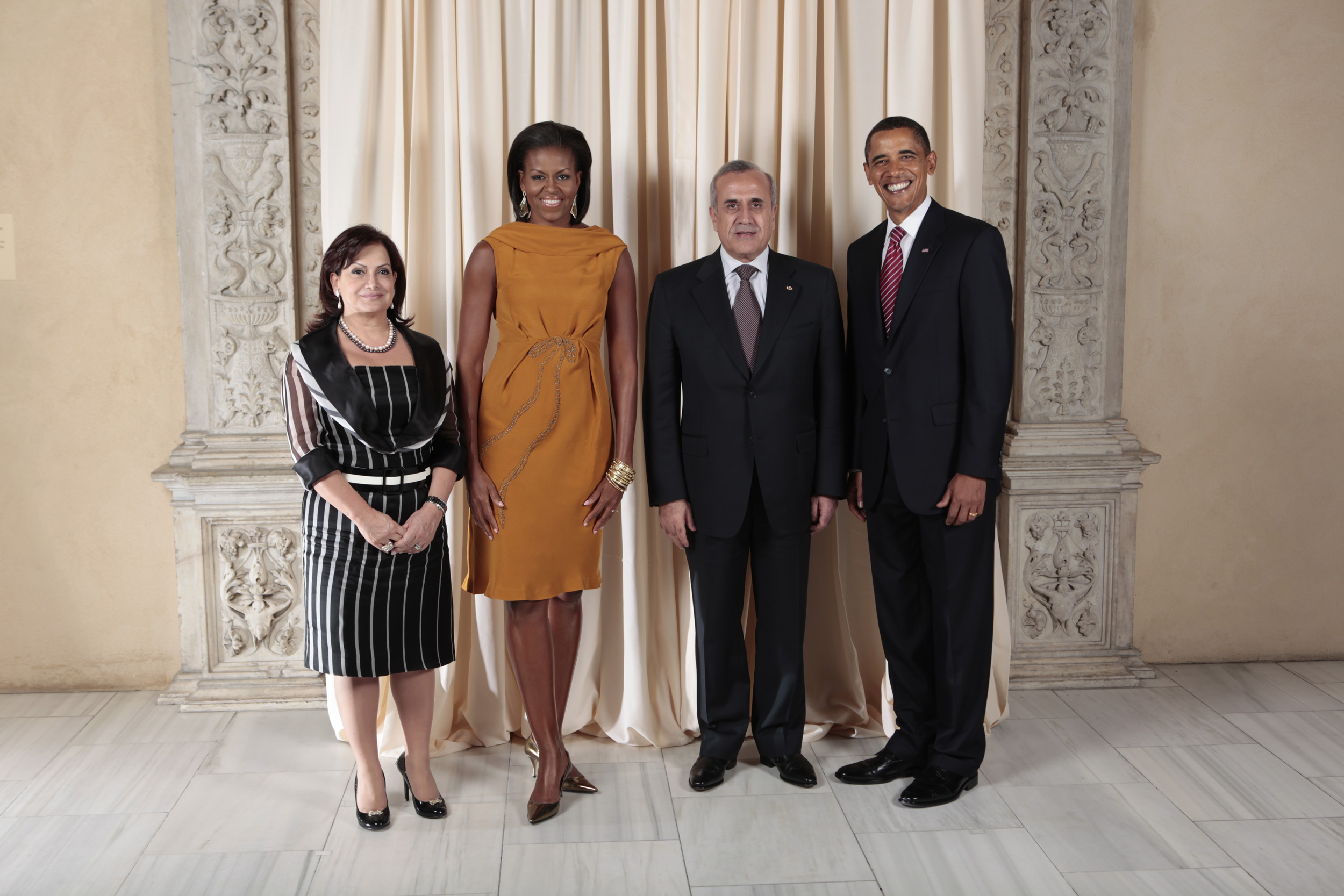

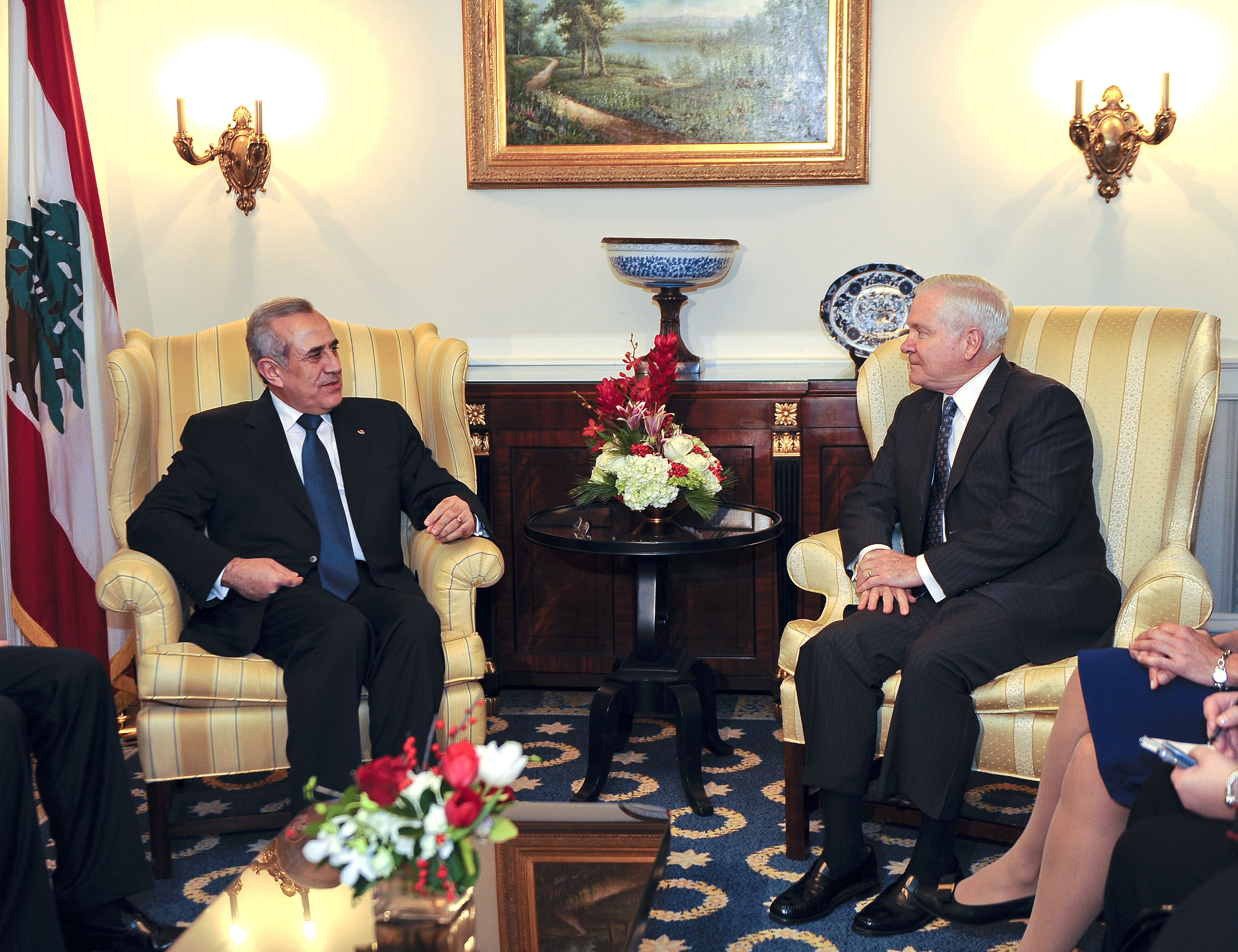

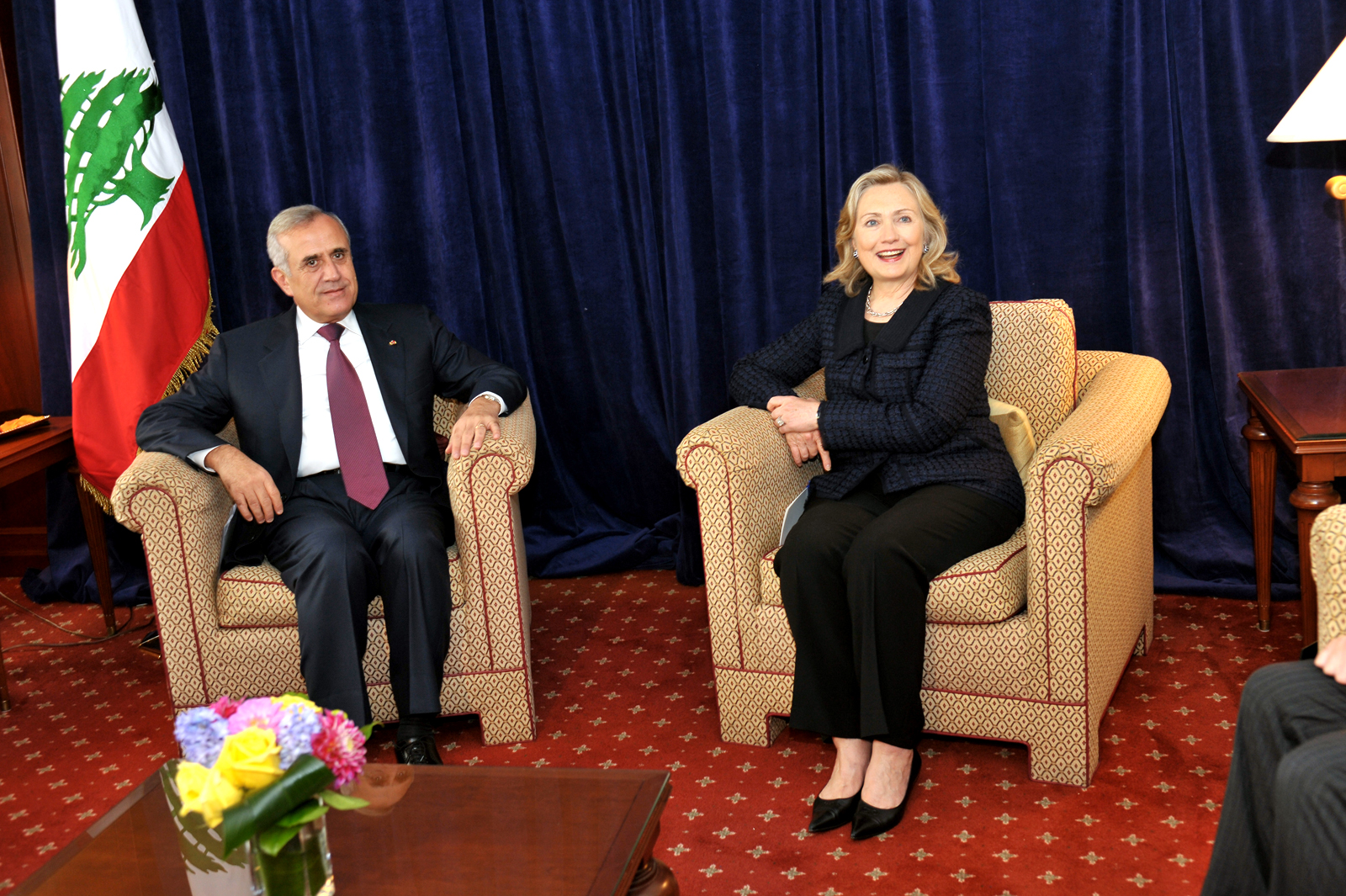

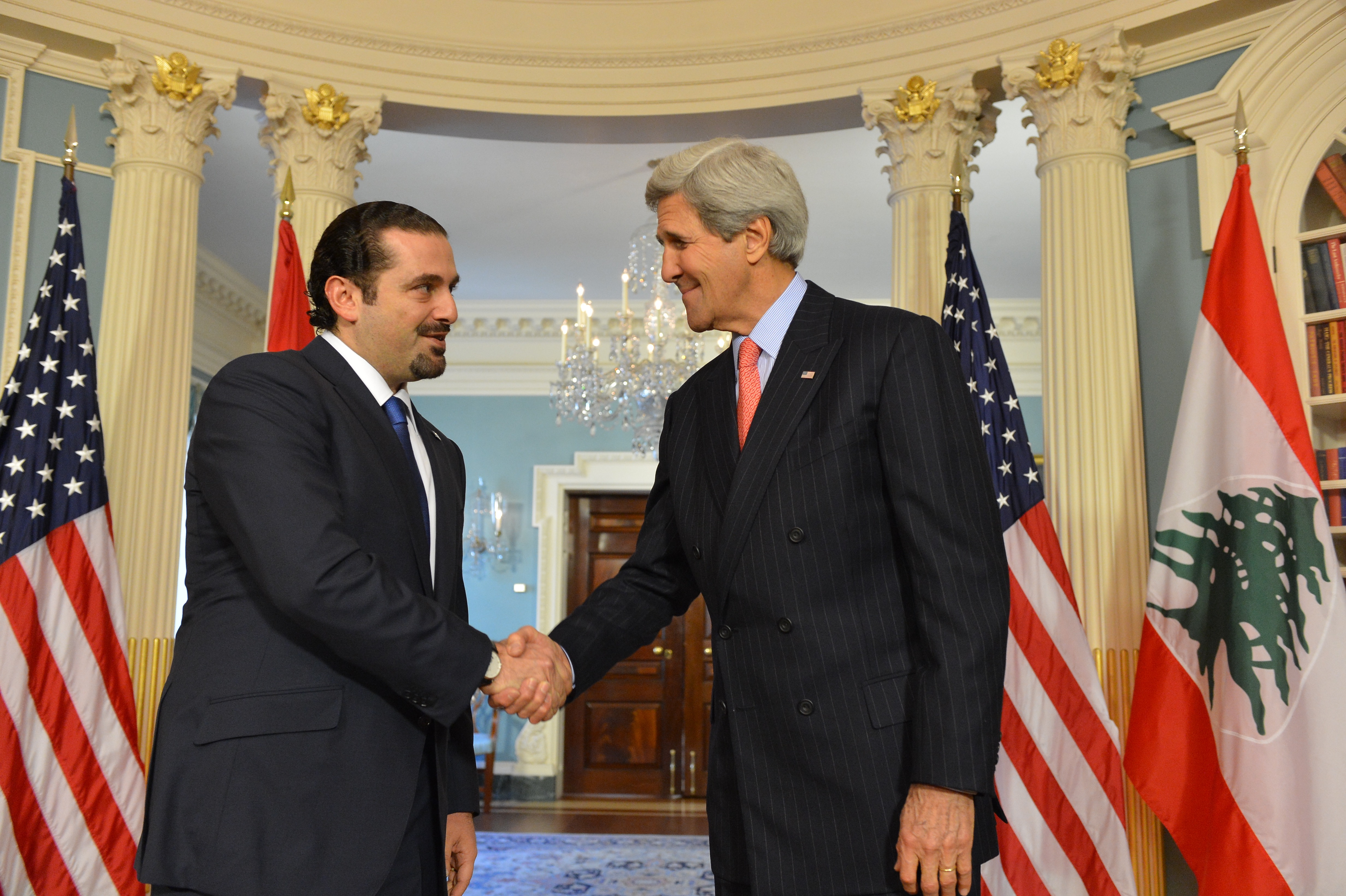

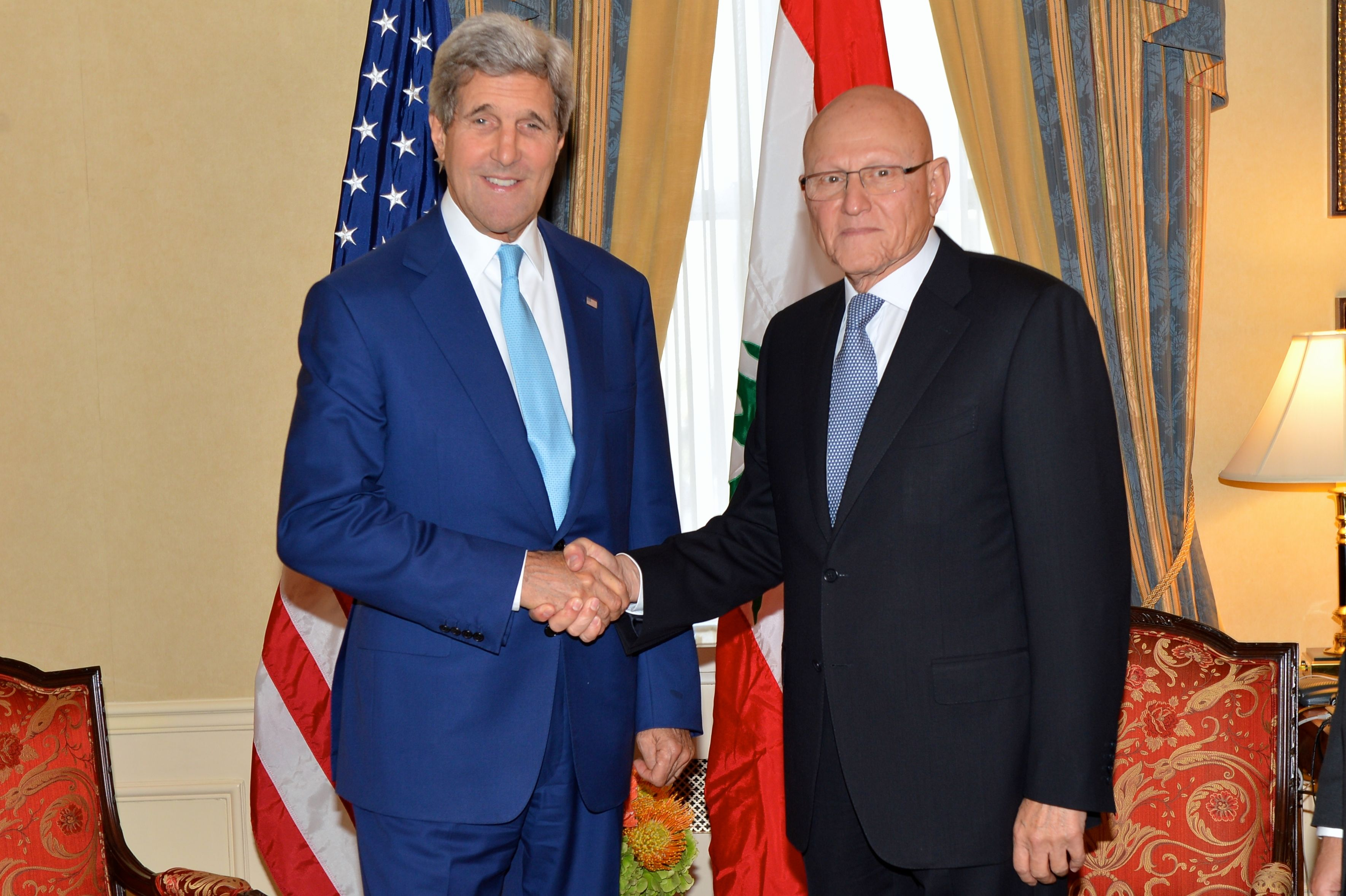

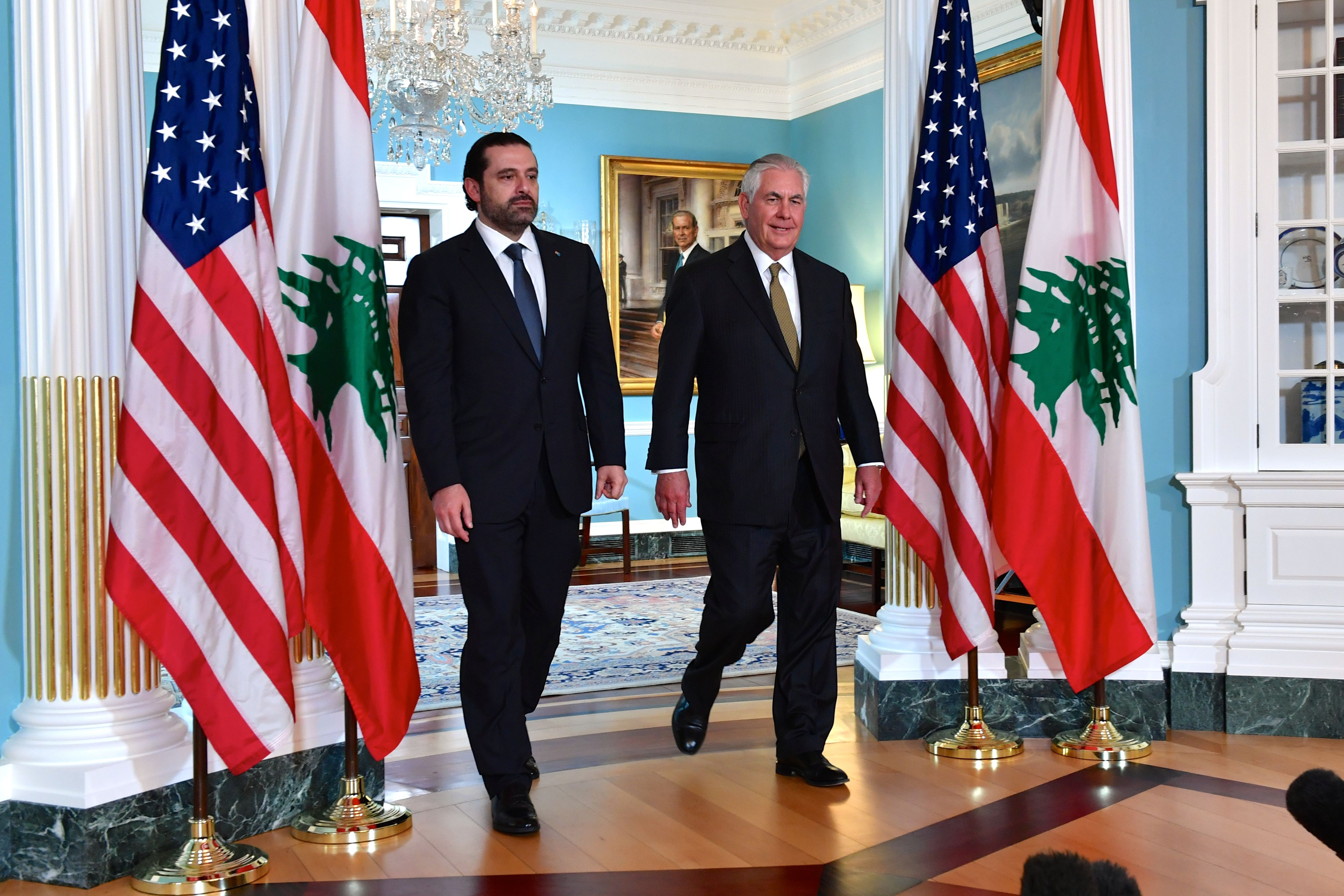

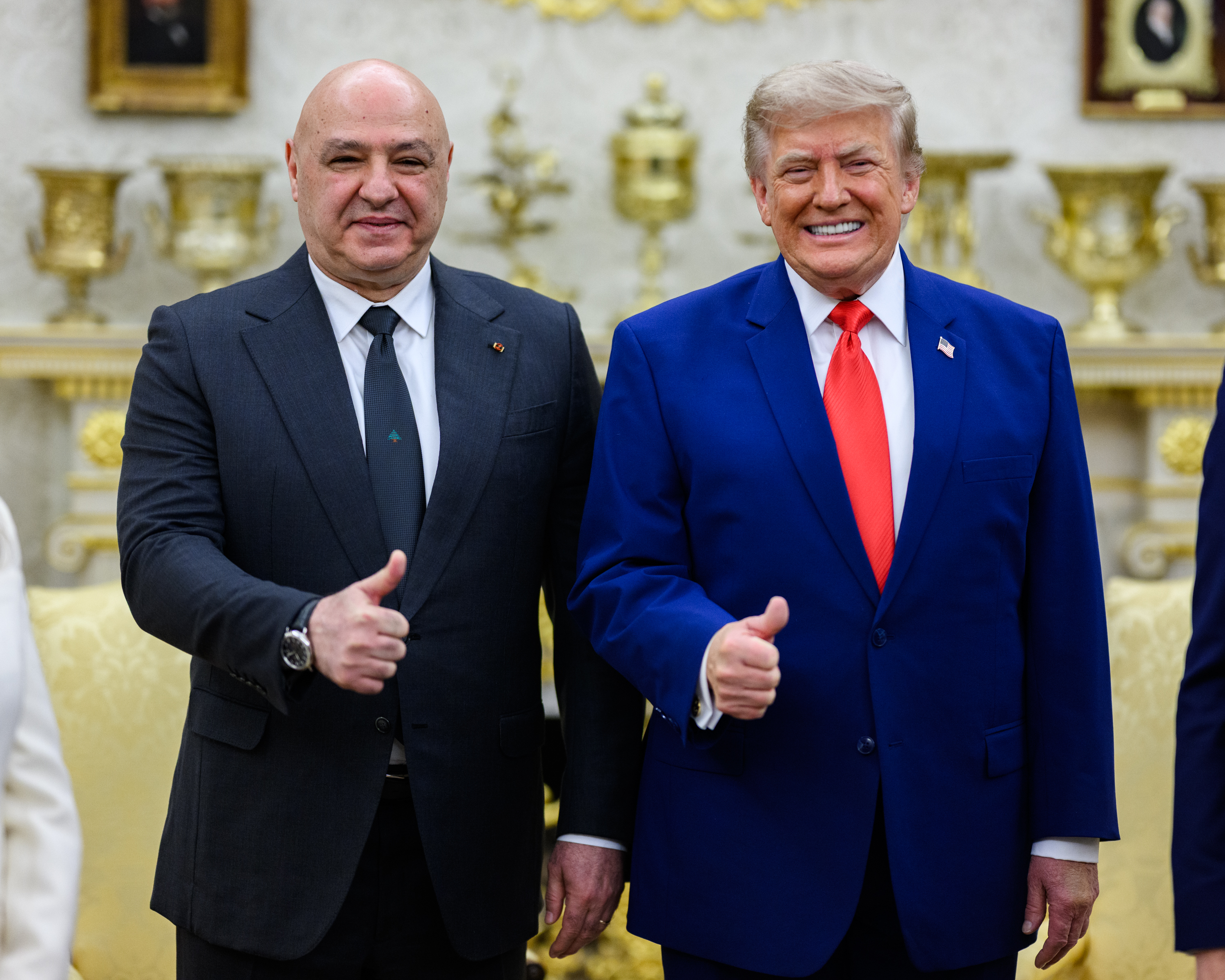

== Malaysia ==
Table of Trips
Start	End	Guest	Title	Reason
October 25, 1960	October 28, 1960	Tunku Abdul Rahman	Prime Minister	Official visit.Afterwards visited Pittsburgh, San Francisco, Akron, and New York City. Departed U.S.November 6.
July 22, 1964	July 22, 1964	Tunku Abdul Rahman	Prime Minister	Official visit. In U.S. July 21 – August 4, visited Williamsburg, Fort Bragg, Miami, Cape Kennedy, and New York City. Traveled to Canada July 28–29.
October 13, 1969	October 13, 1969	Tunku Abdul Rahman	Prime Minister	Private visit.
October 5, 1971	October 5, 1971	Abdul Razak Hussein	Prime Minister	Private visit.
January 17, 1984	January 20, 1984	Mahathir Mohamad	Prime Minister	Official Working Visit. Private visit to Tulsa afterward.
May 21, 1989	May 21, 1989	Mahathir Mohamad	Prime Minister	Met with President Bush in Boston.
May 6, 1994	May 8, 1994	Mahathir Mohamad	Prime Minister	Met with President Clinton in White House.
May 21, 1996	May 21, 1996	Mahathir Mohamad	Prime Minister	Met with President Clinton during a private visit.
January 13, 1997	January 19, 1997	Mahathir Mohamad	Prime Minister	Working visit.
May 13, 2002	May 15, 2002	Mahathir Mohamad	Prime Minister	Working visit.
July 18, 2004	July 20, 2004	Abdullah Ahmad Badawi	Prime Minister	Working visit.
September 18, 2006	September 18, 2006	Abdullah Ahmad Badawi	Prime Minister	Met with President Bush at the UN General Assembly in New York City.
April 12, 2010	April 13, 2010	Najib Razak	Prime Minister	Attended the Nuclear Security Summit
September 12, 2017	September 12, 2017	Najib Razak	Prime Minister	Official Working Visit.
May 12, 2022	May 13, 2022	Ismail Sabri Yaakob	Prime Minister	Attended the U.S.-ASEAN Summit.
November 12, 2023	November 17, 2023	Anwar Ibrahim	Prime Minister	Attended the APEC Leaders' Summit at San Francisco, California.

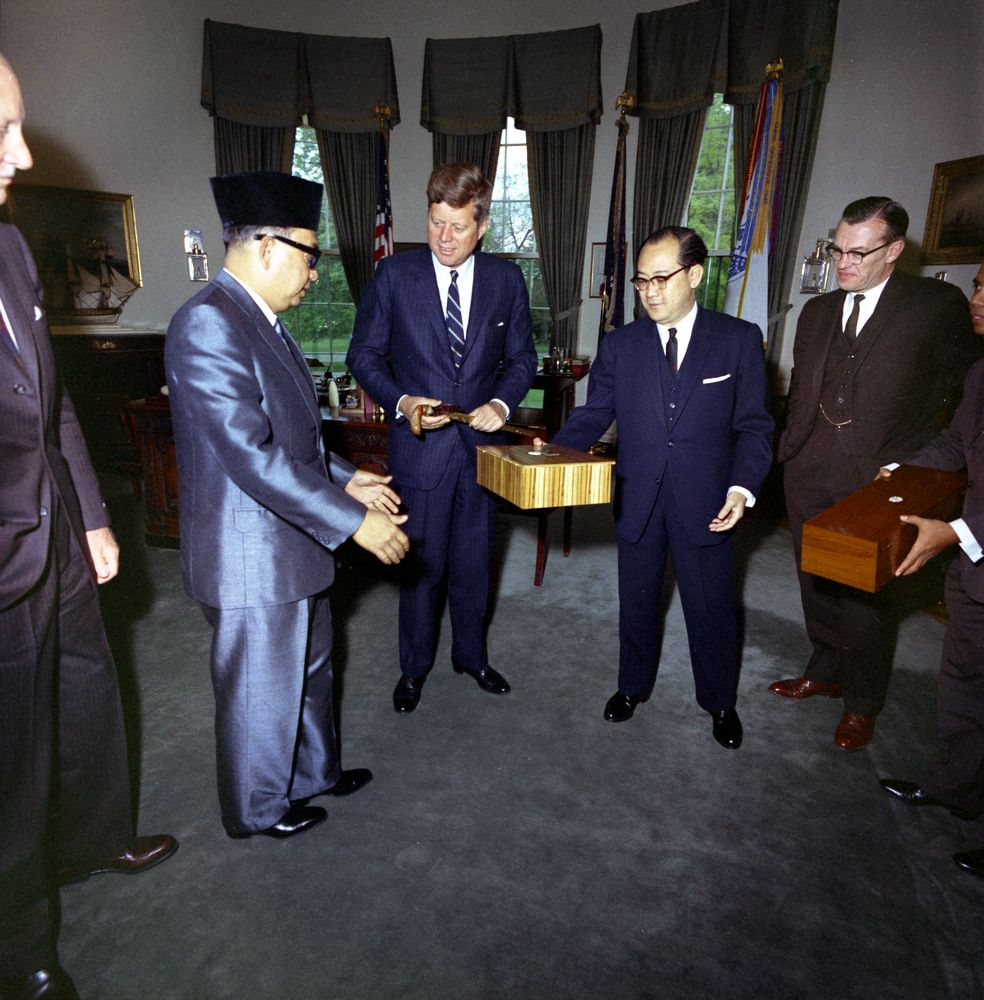

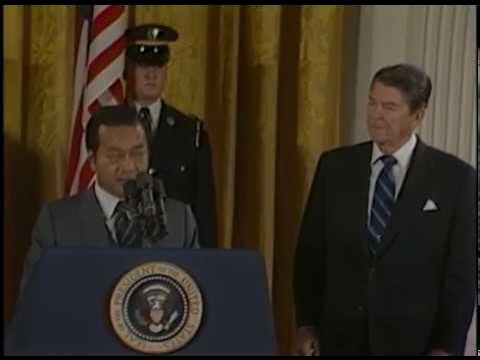

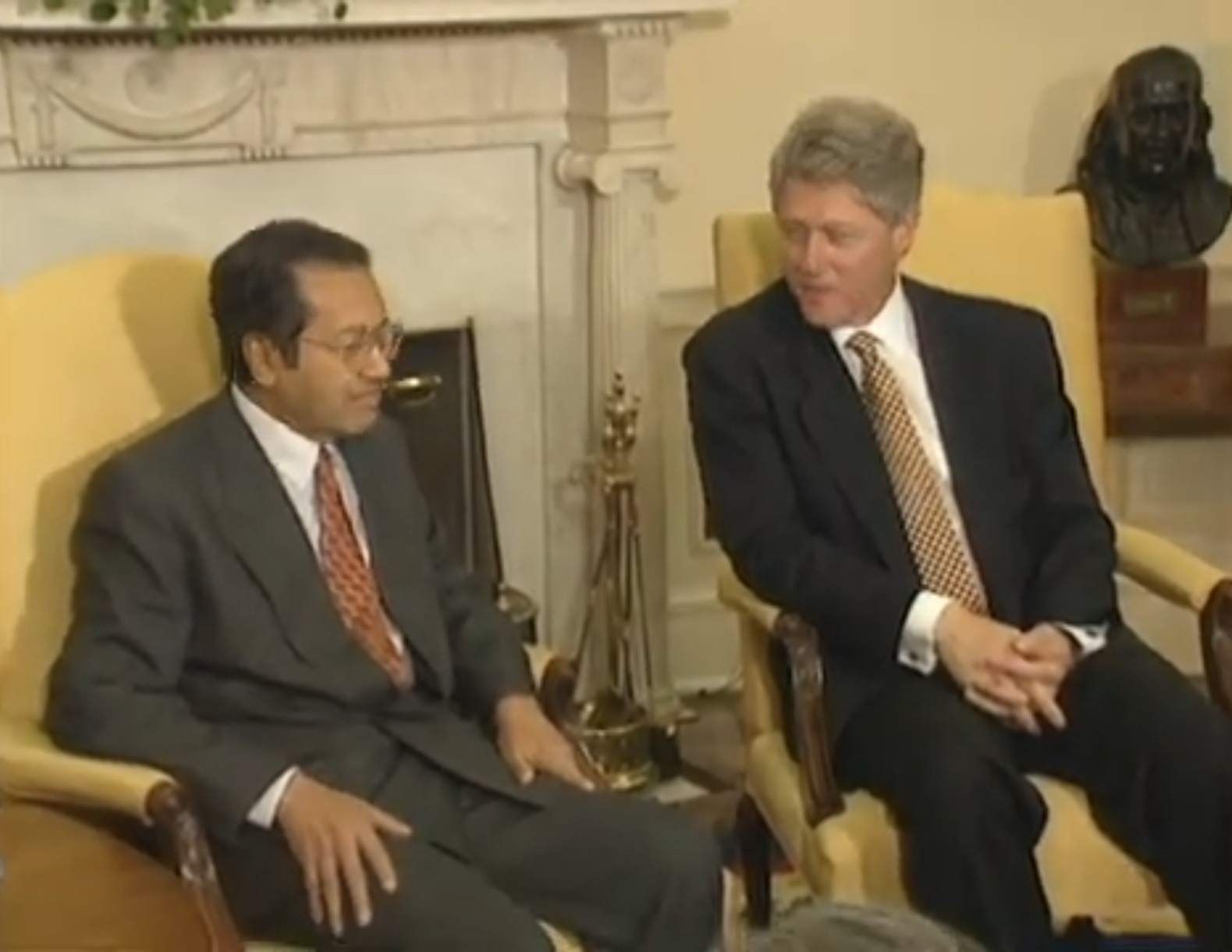

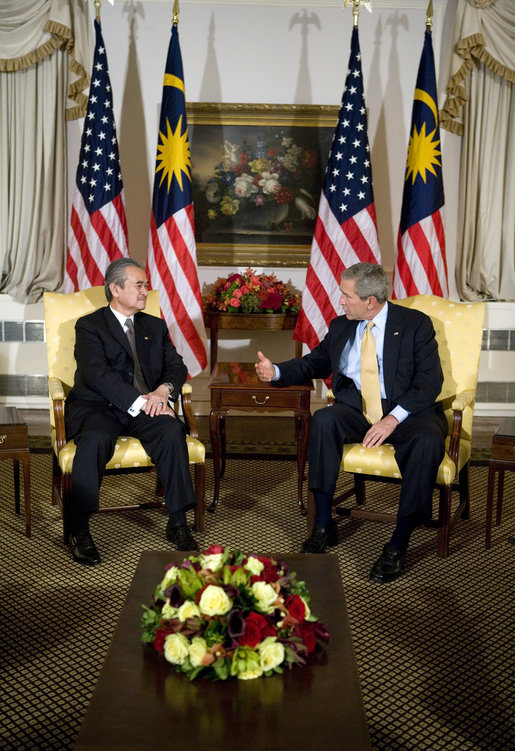

== Myanmar (Burma) ==
Table of Trips
Start	End	Guest	Title	Reason
June 29, 1955	July 3, 1955	U Nu	Prime Minister	Official visit. In U.S.June 24 – July 16. Visited New York City, Detroit, Knoxville, the Grand Canyon, Los Angeles, and San Francisco.
December 16, 1957	December 8, 1957	Win Maung	President	Private visit to obtain medical treatment. Met with President Eisenhower December 23.
September 8, 1966	September 10, 1966	Ne Win	Chairman	State visit. In U.S.September 8–10; visited New York City, Williamsburg, California, and Hawaii.
May 19, 2013	May 21, 2013	Thein Sein	President	Working visit.

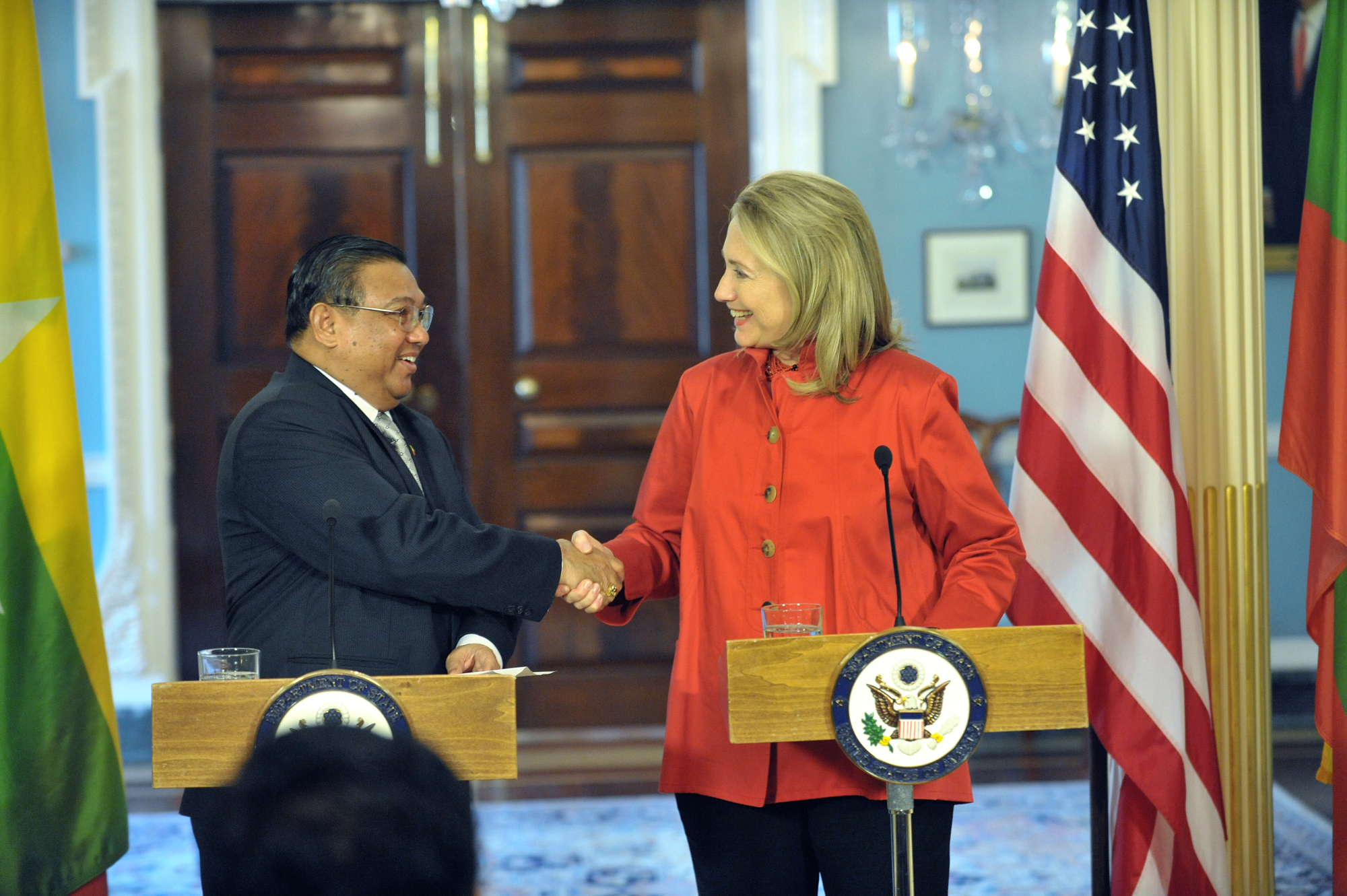

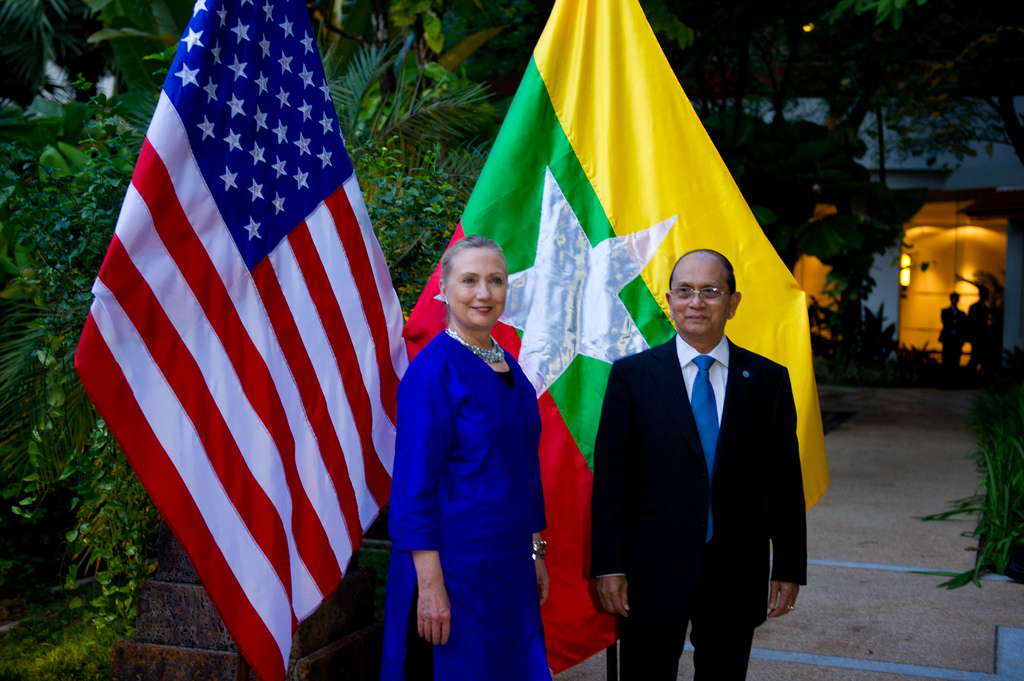

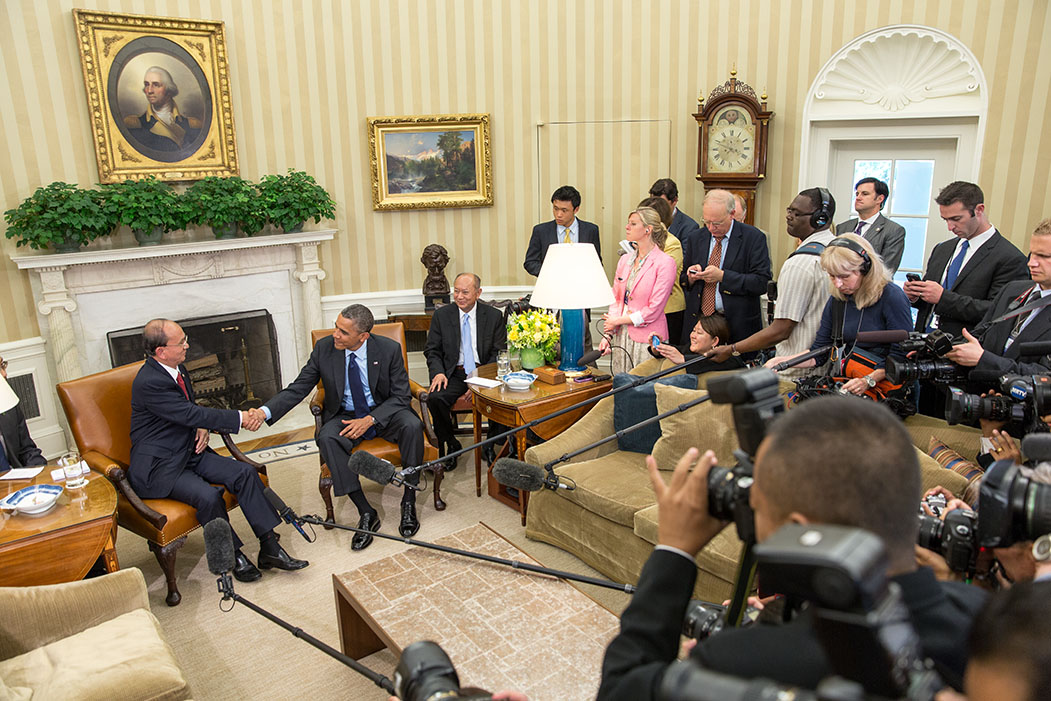

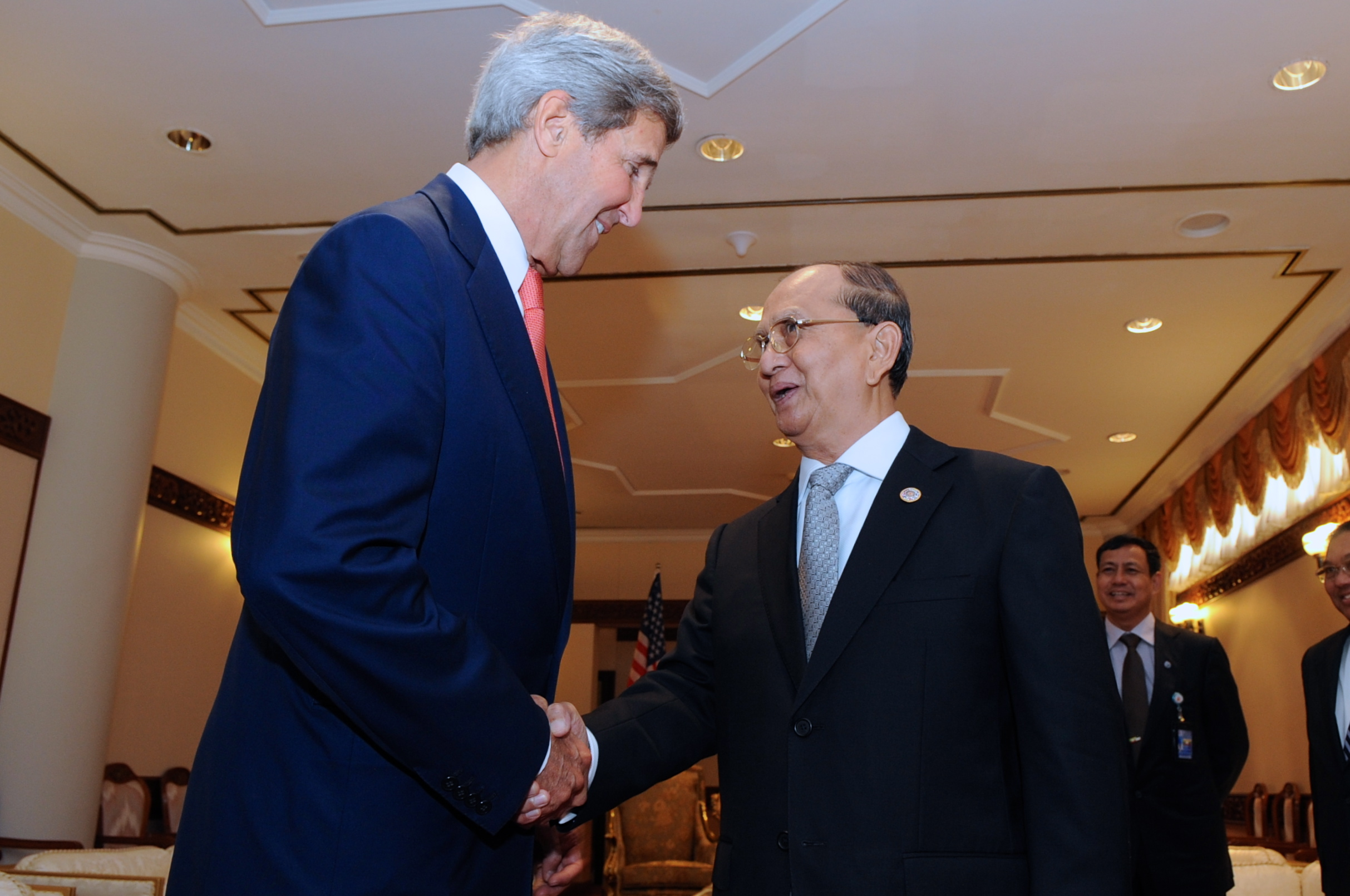

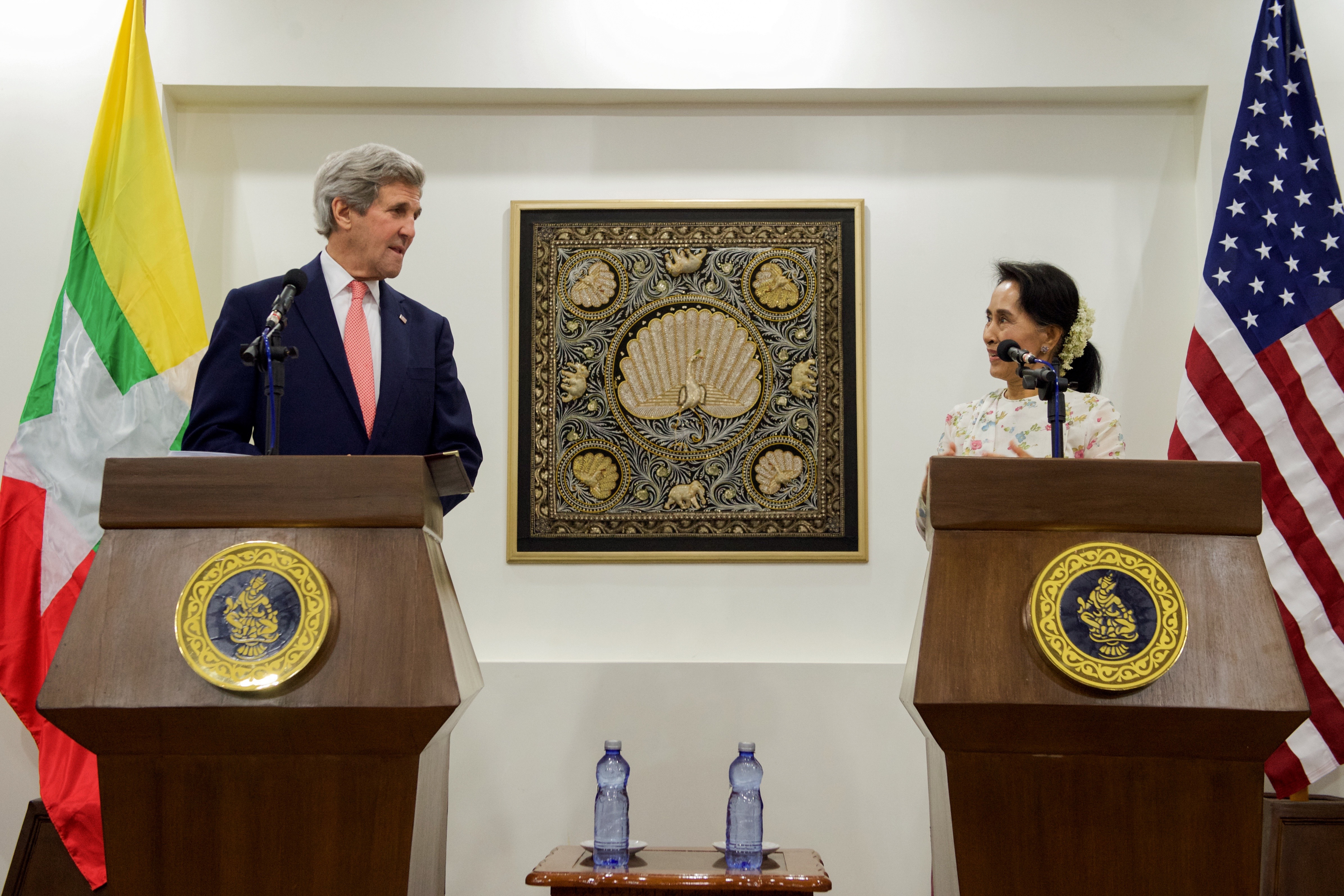

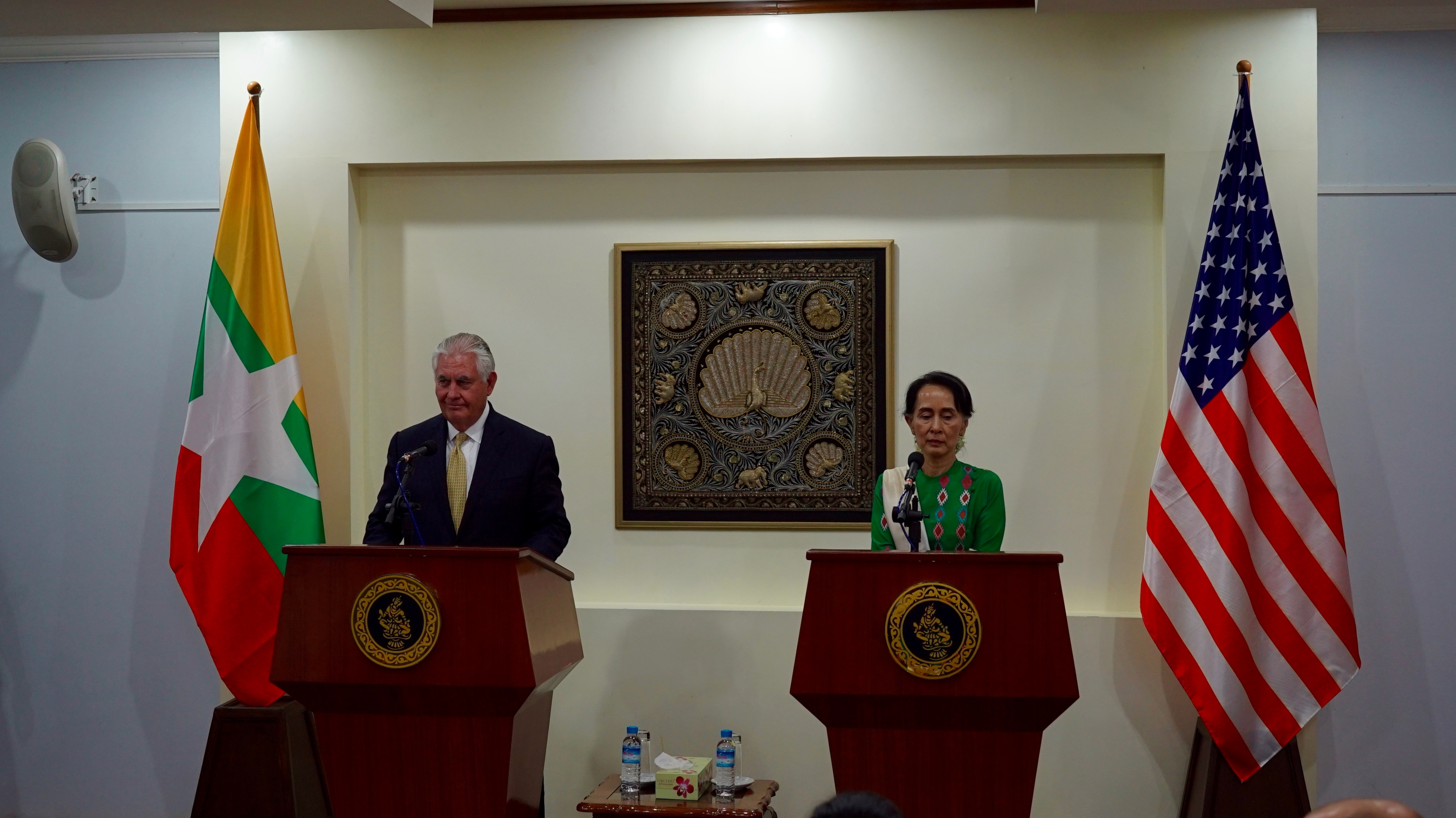

== Mongolia ==
Table of Trips
Start	End	Guest	Title	Reason
January 22, 1991	January 24, 1991	Punsalmaagiin Ochirbat	President	Official working visit.Private visit to New York City afterward. Arrived in U.S. Jan.20; departed Jan.26.
July 14, 2004	July 21, 2004	Natsagiin Bagabandi	President	Working visit.
October 21, 2007	October 23, 2007	Nambaryn Enkhbayar	President	Working visit. Signed Millennium Challenge Corporation Compact.
June 16, 2011	June 16, 2011	Tsakhiagiin Elbegdorj	President	Working visit.
July 31, 2019	August 2, 2019	Khaltmaagiin Battulga	President	Working visit.

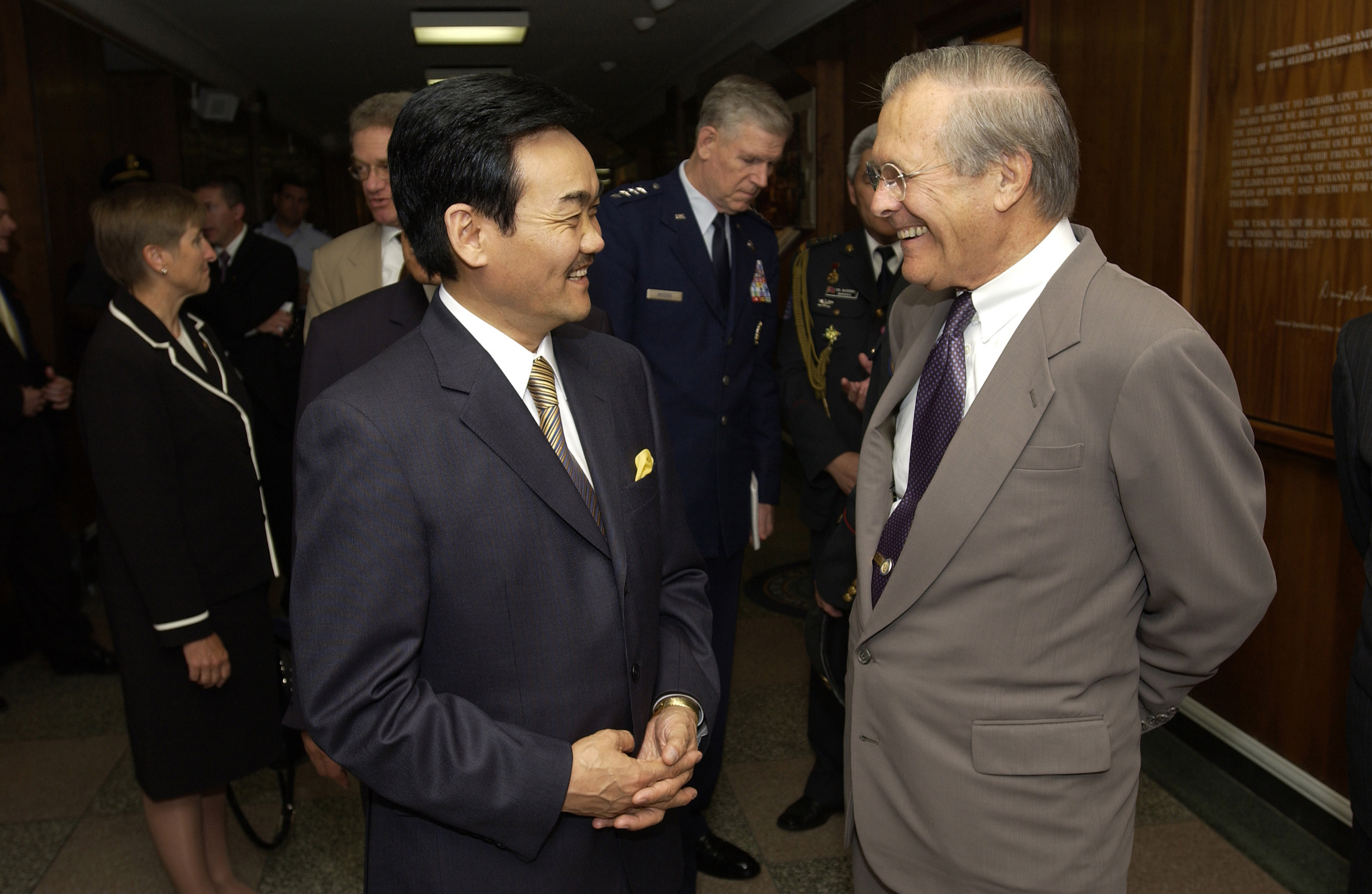

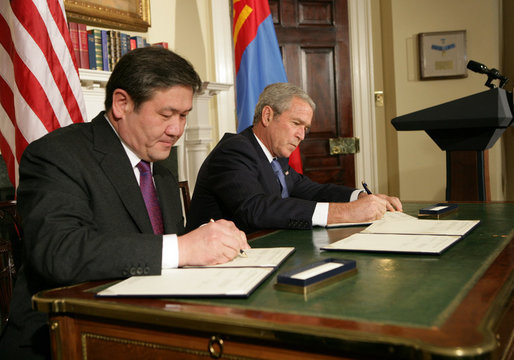

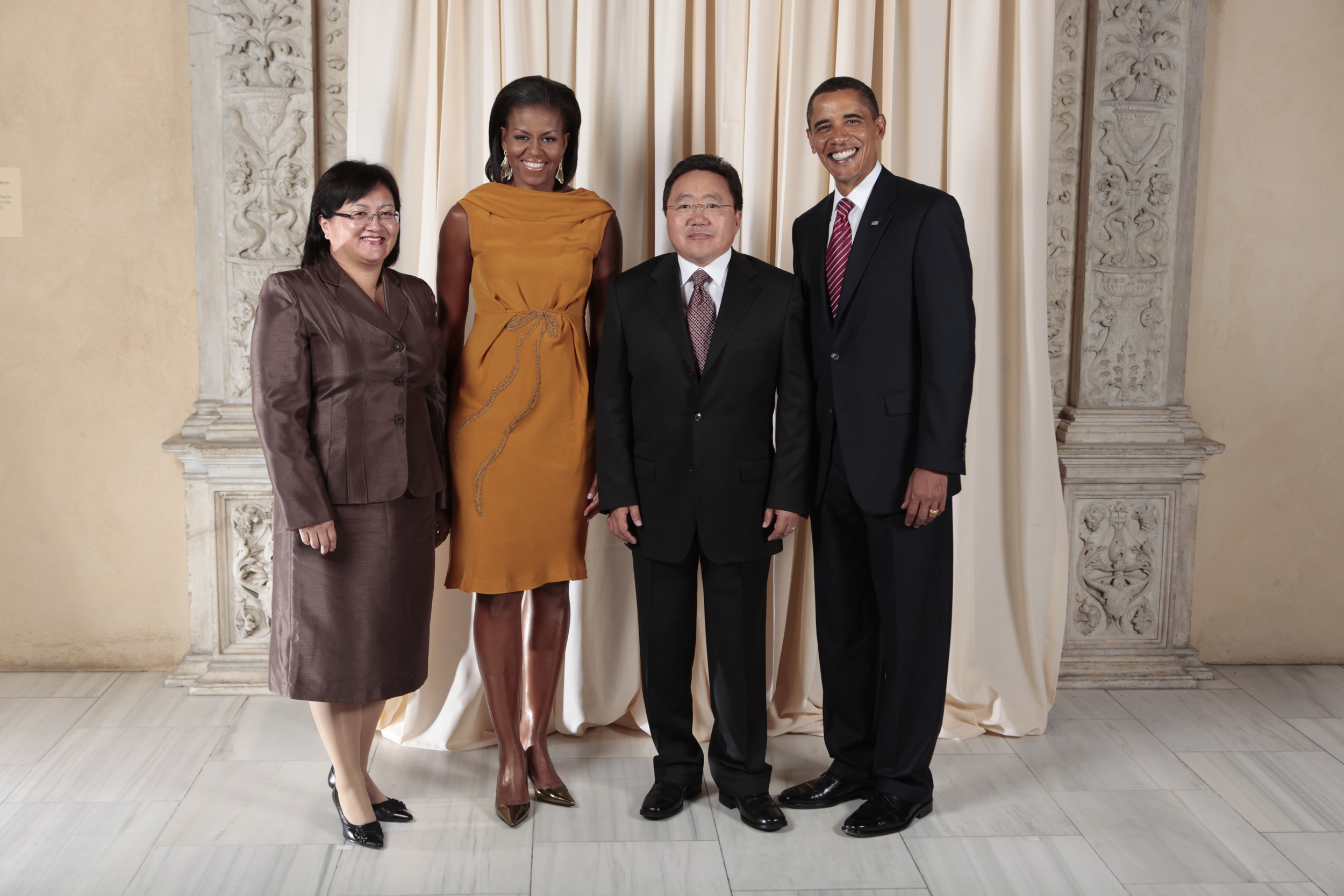

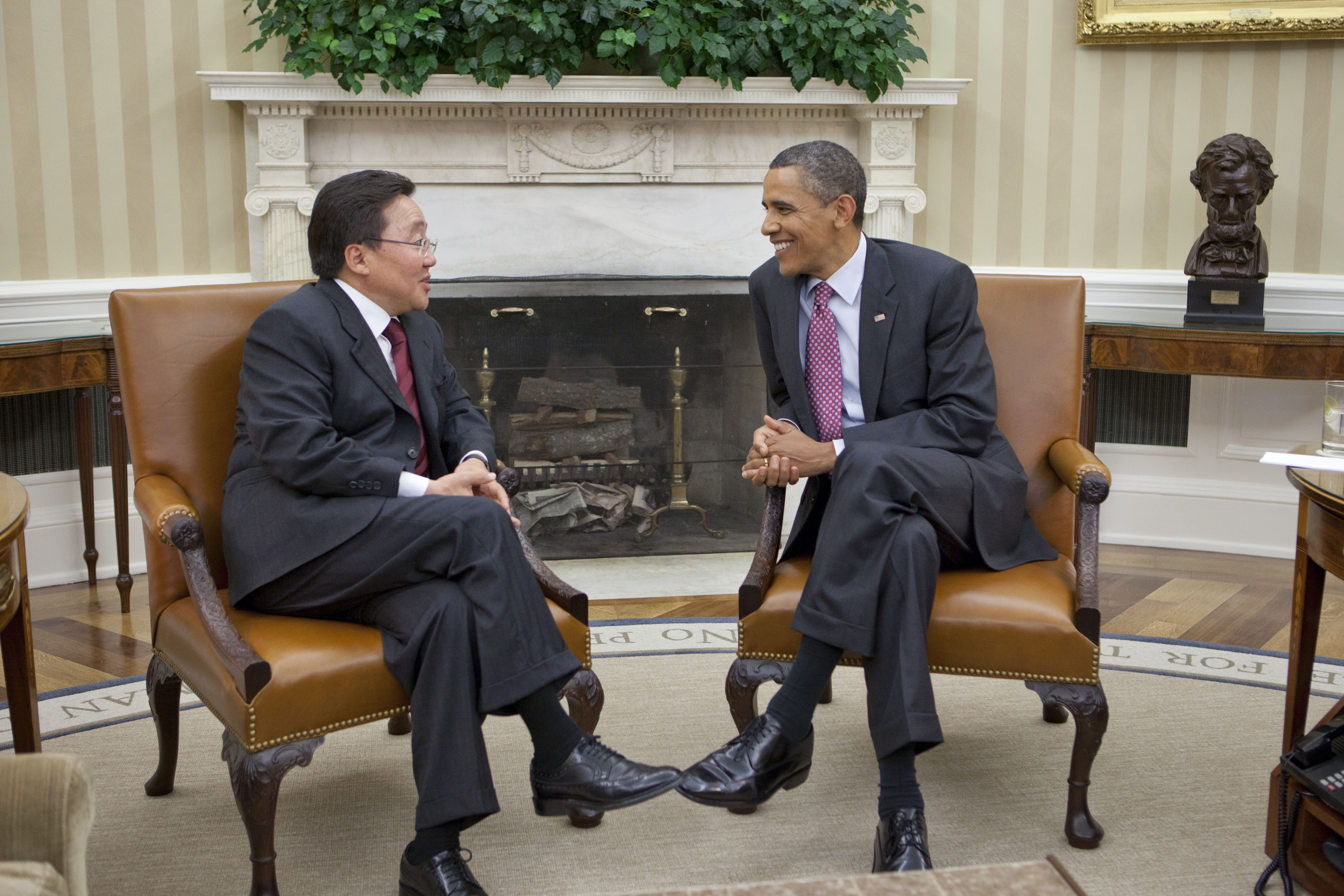

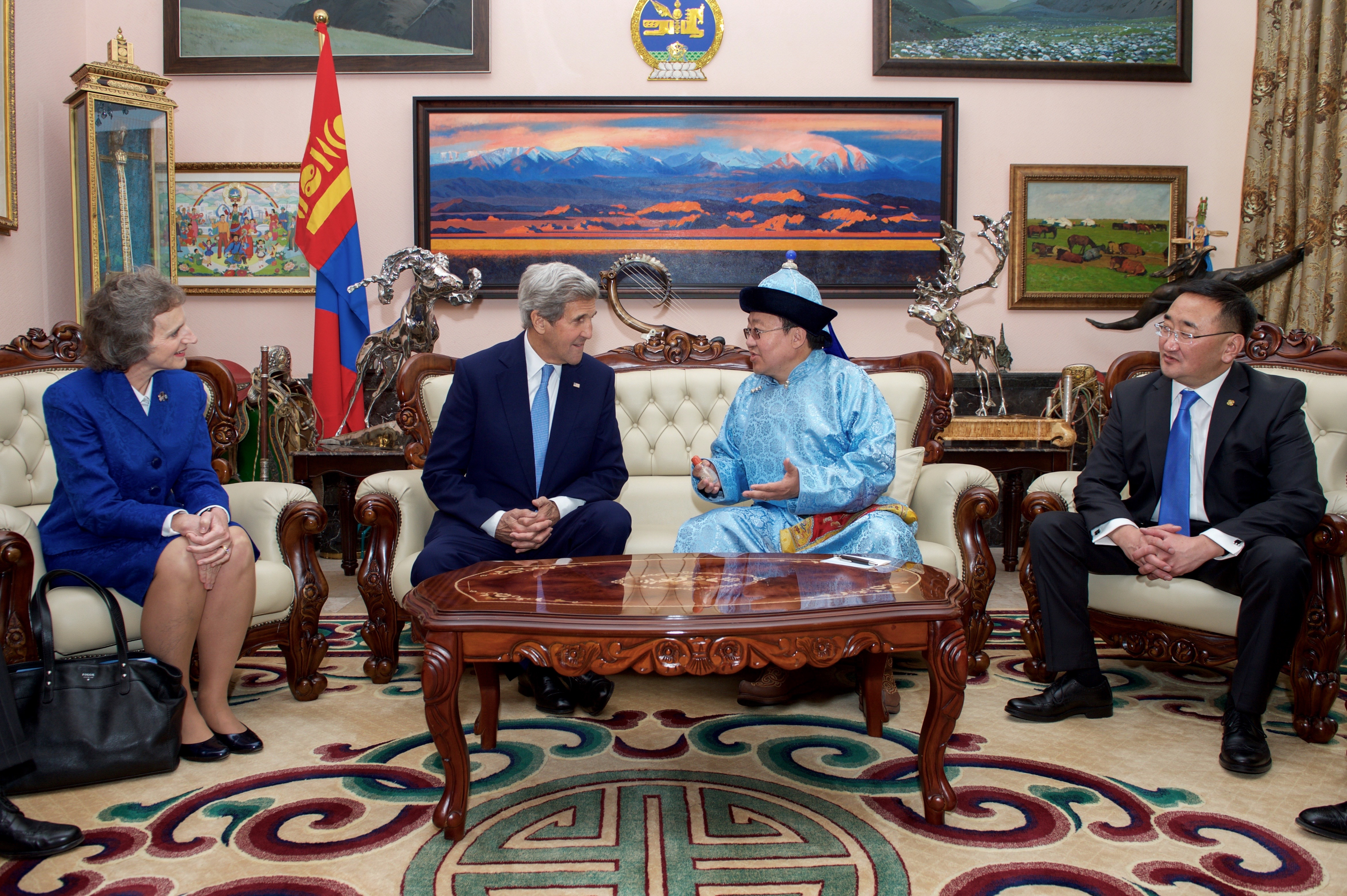

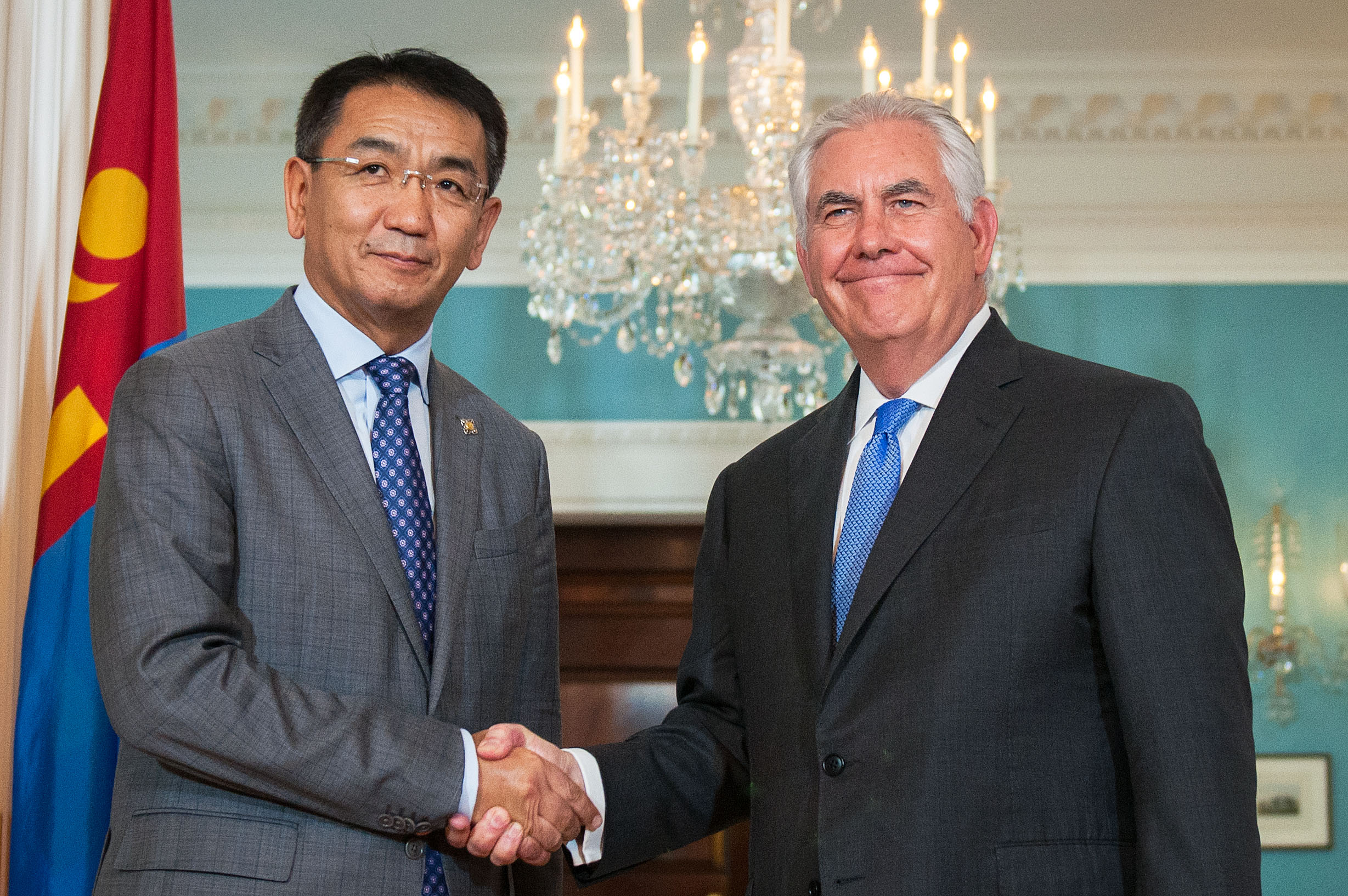

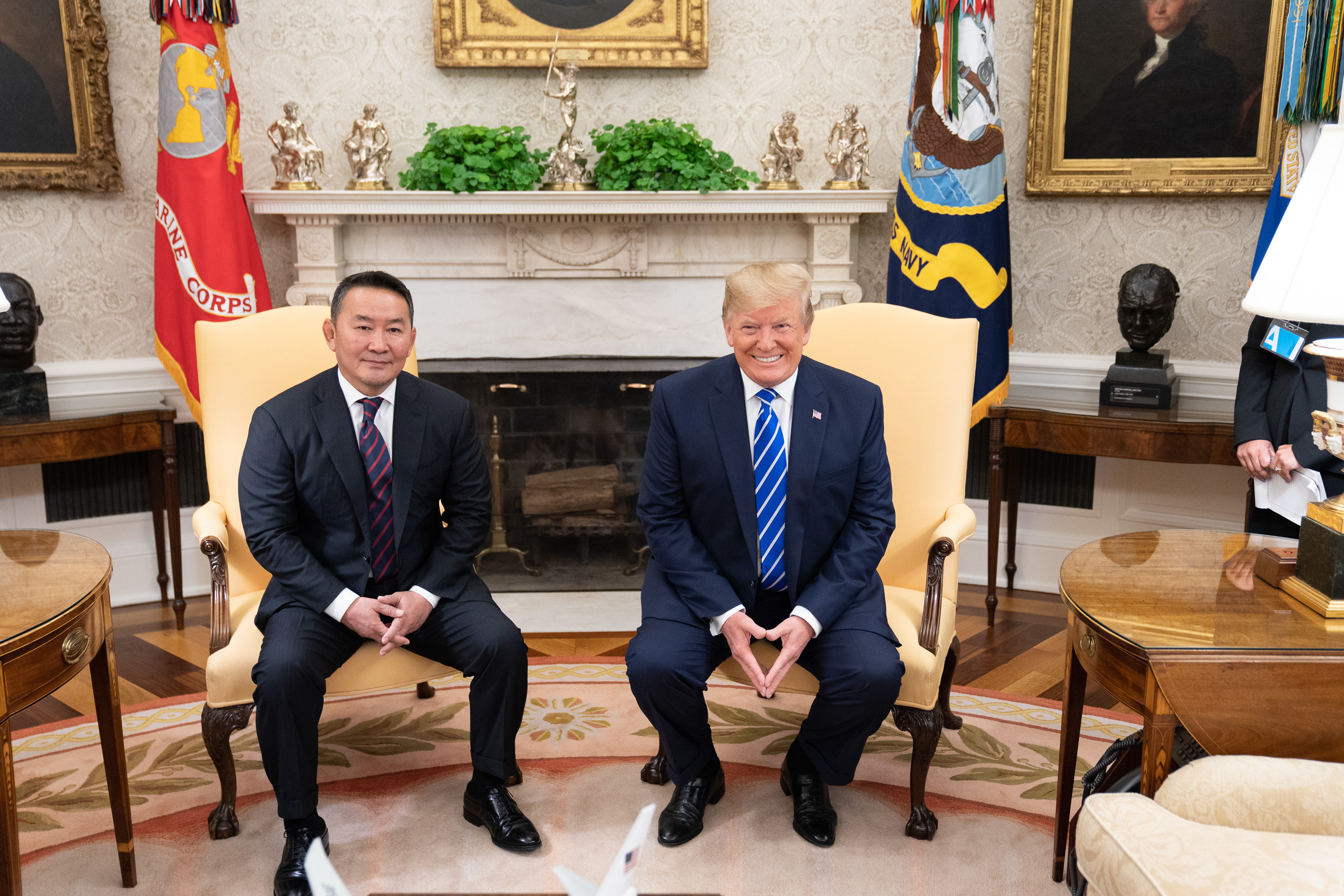

== Nepal ==
Table of Trips
Start	End	Guest	Title	Reason
April 27, 1960	April 30, 1960	Mahendra	King	Official visit. Addressed U.S.Congress April 28. In U.S. April 25 – June 1. Also visited Mexico (May 16–18) and Canada (May 25–28). U.S. travel included Honolulu, Hawaii, New York City, Knoxville, Salem and Eugene, San Francisco, Los Angeles, Albuquerque, Dallas, Miami, and Detroit.
September 22, 1960	September 22, 1960	Bishweshwar Prasad Koirala	Prime Minister	Met with President Eisenhower in New York City while attending UN General Assembly session.
November 1, 1967	November 3, 1967	Mahendra	King	State visit. In U.S. October 30 – December 3; visited Williamsburg, Cape Kennedy, and New York City. Hunting trip in Alaska after November 9.
December 5, 1983	December 10, 1983	Birendra	King	State visit; visited Orlando, Dallas, New York City, and Boston (December 10–13). Private visit afterward to Atlanta, San Francisco, and Honolulu, Hawaii.
May 6, 2002	May 8, 2002	Sher Bahadur Deuba	Prime Minister	Met with President Bush May 7 during a private visit.

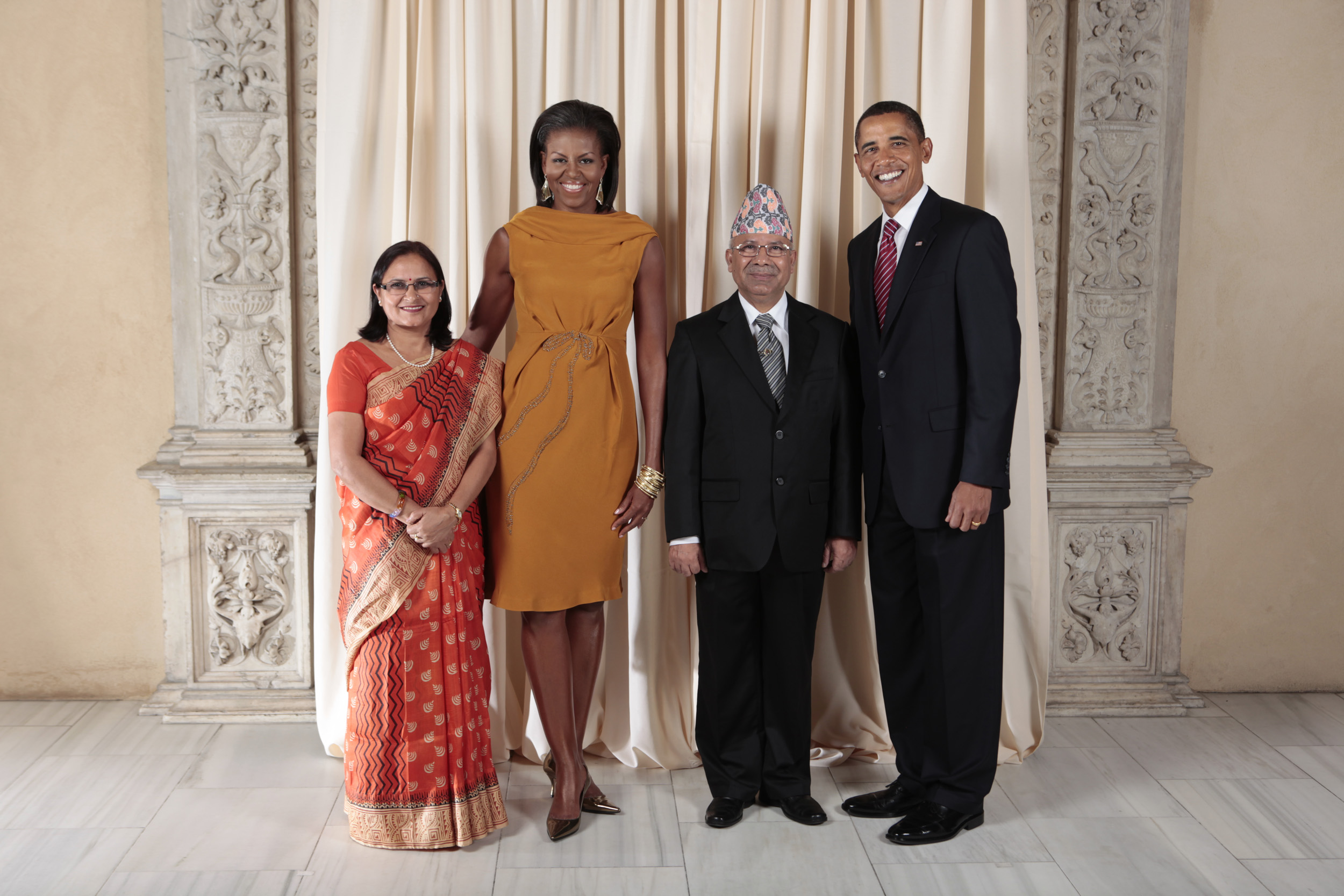

== Oman ==
Table of Trips
Start	End	Guest	Title	Reason
March 3, 1938	March 6, 1938	Said bin Taimur	Sultan	Visited Washington, D.C. during a three-week private visit.
January 9, 1975	January 9, 1975	Qaboos bin Said al Said	Sultan	Private visit. Departed U.S.January 11.
April 11, 1983	April 15, 1983	Qaboos bin Said al Said	Sultan	State visit.

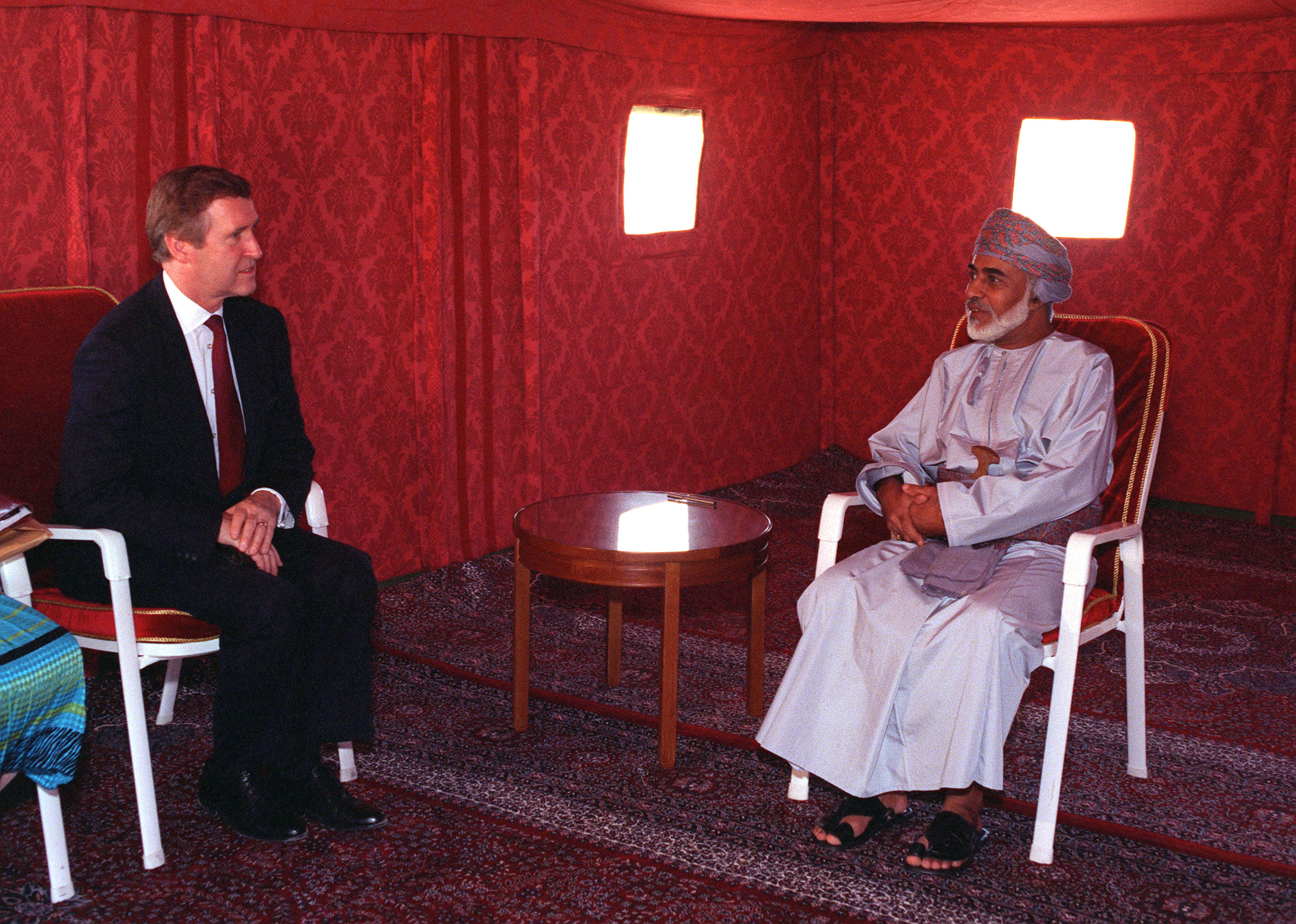

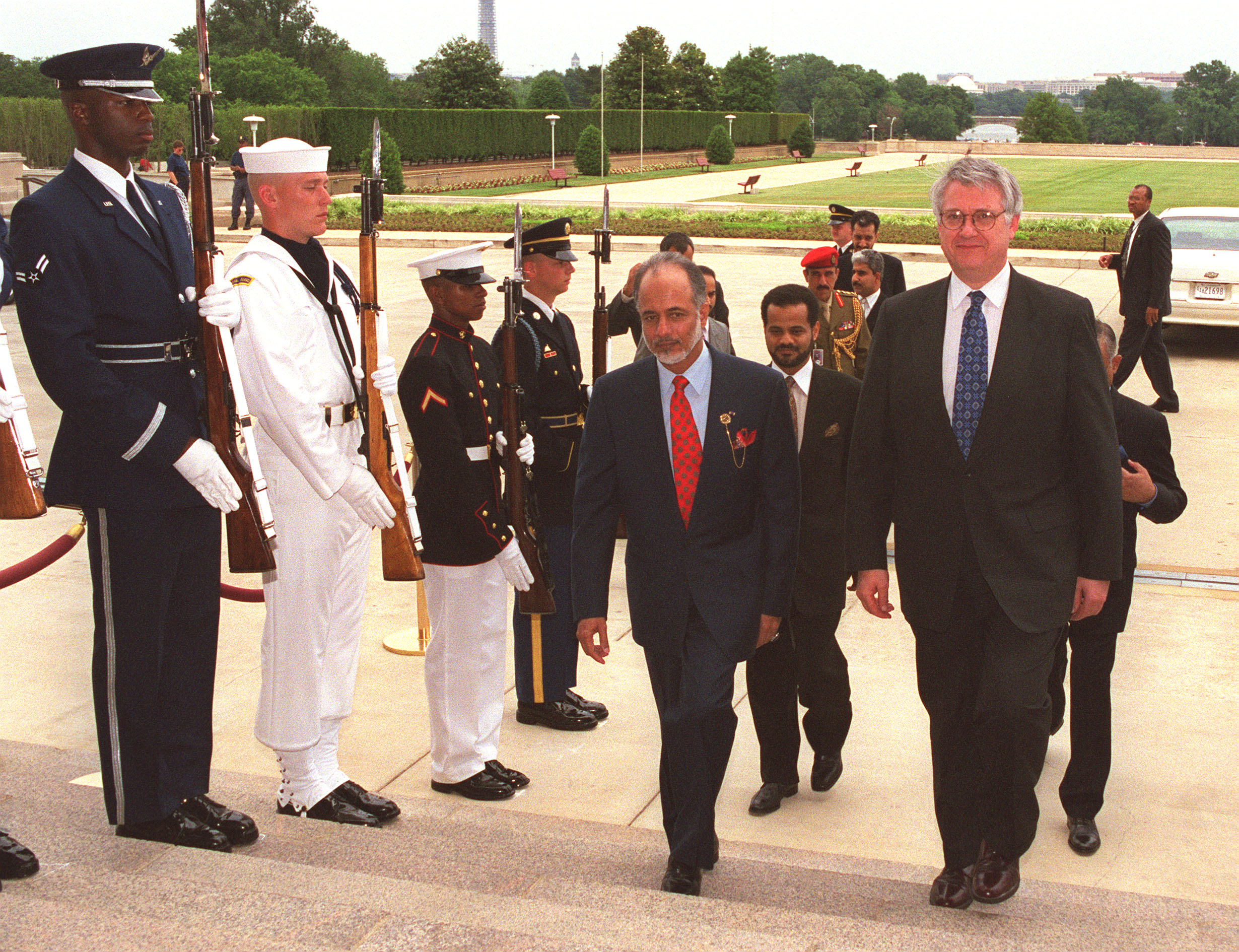

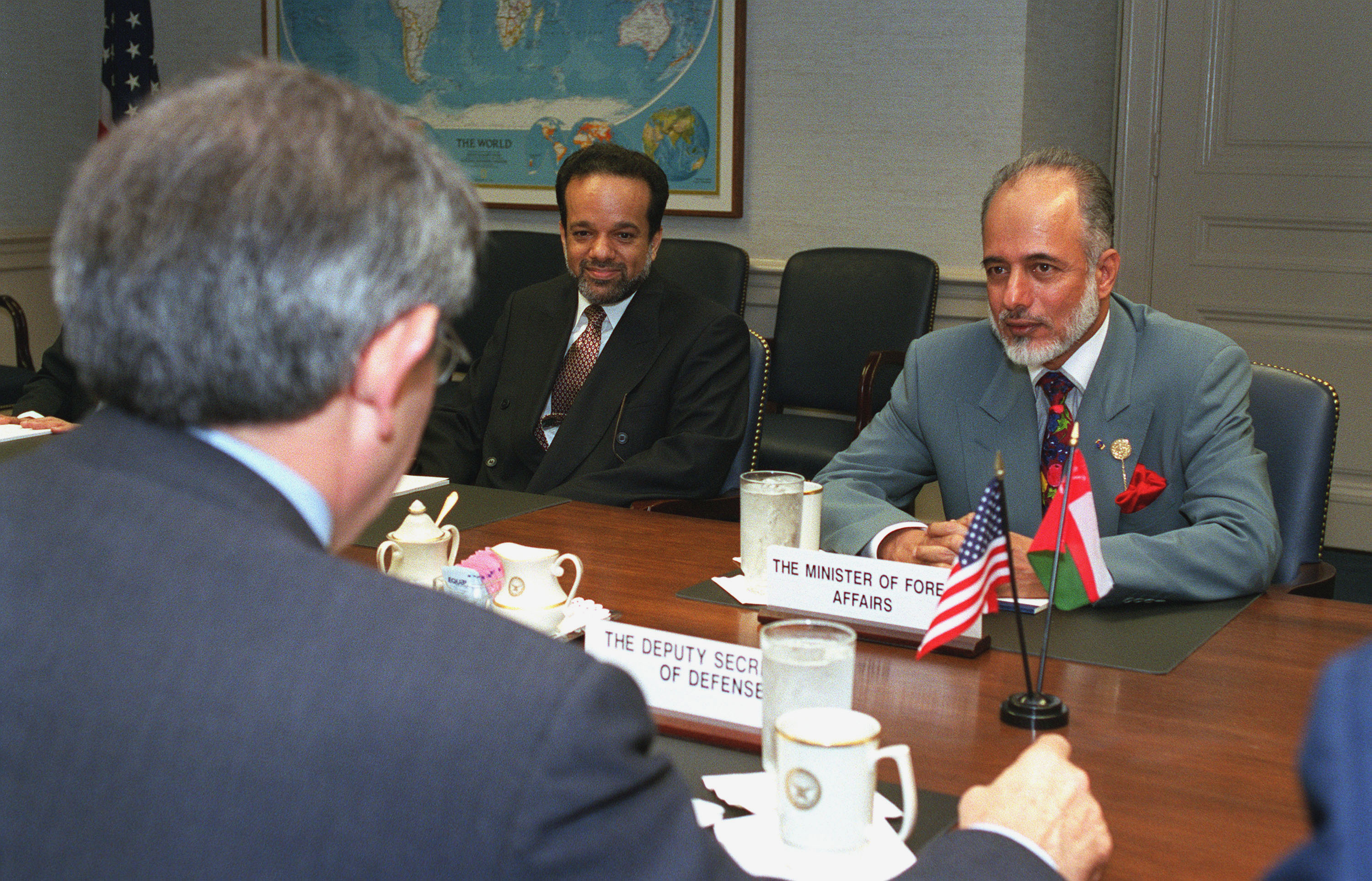

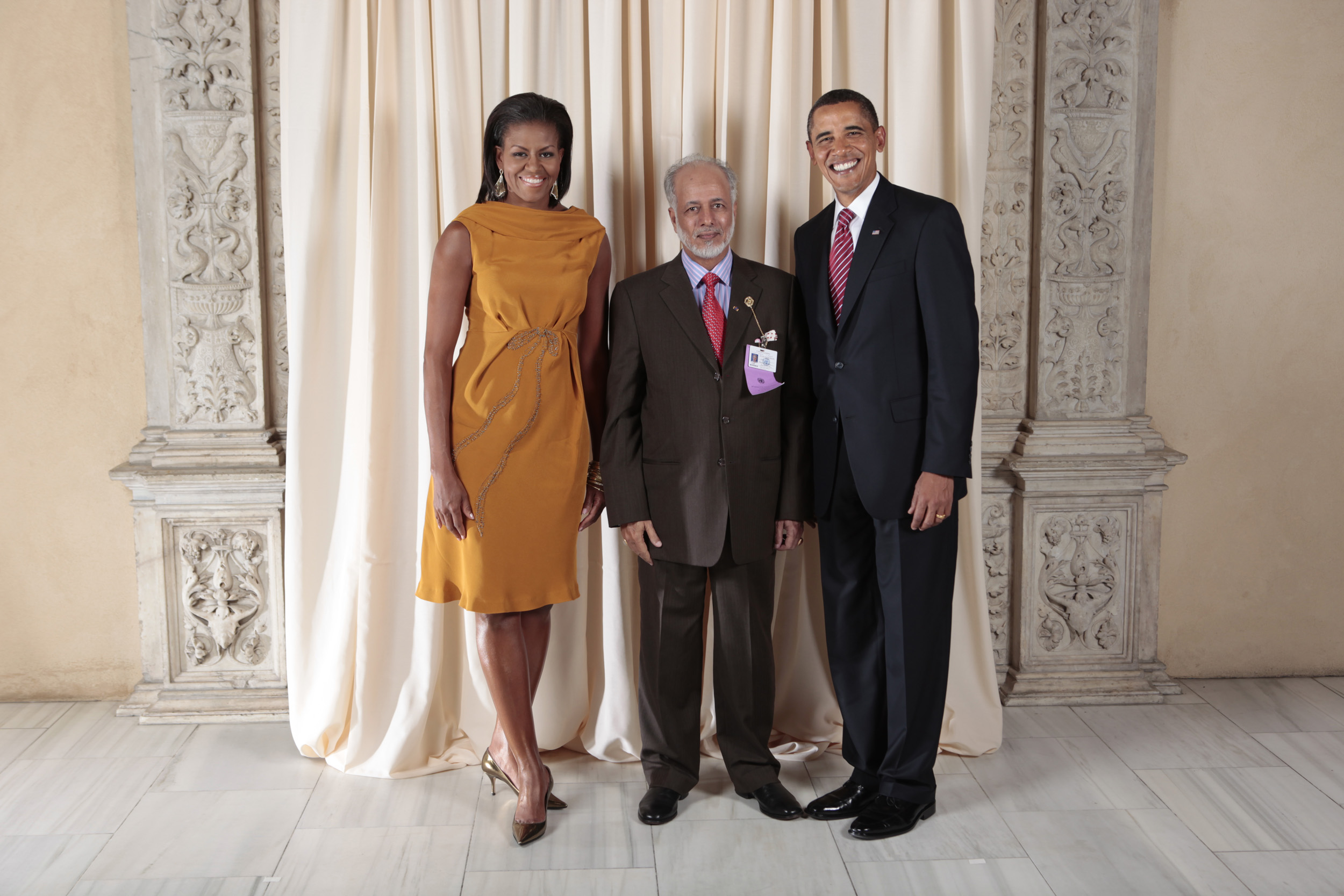

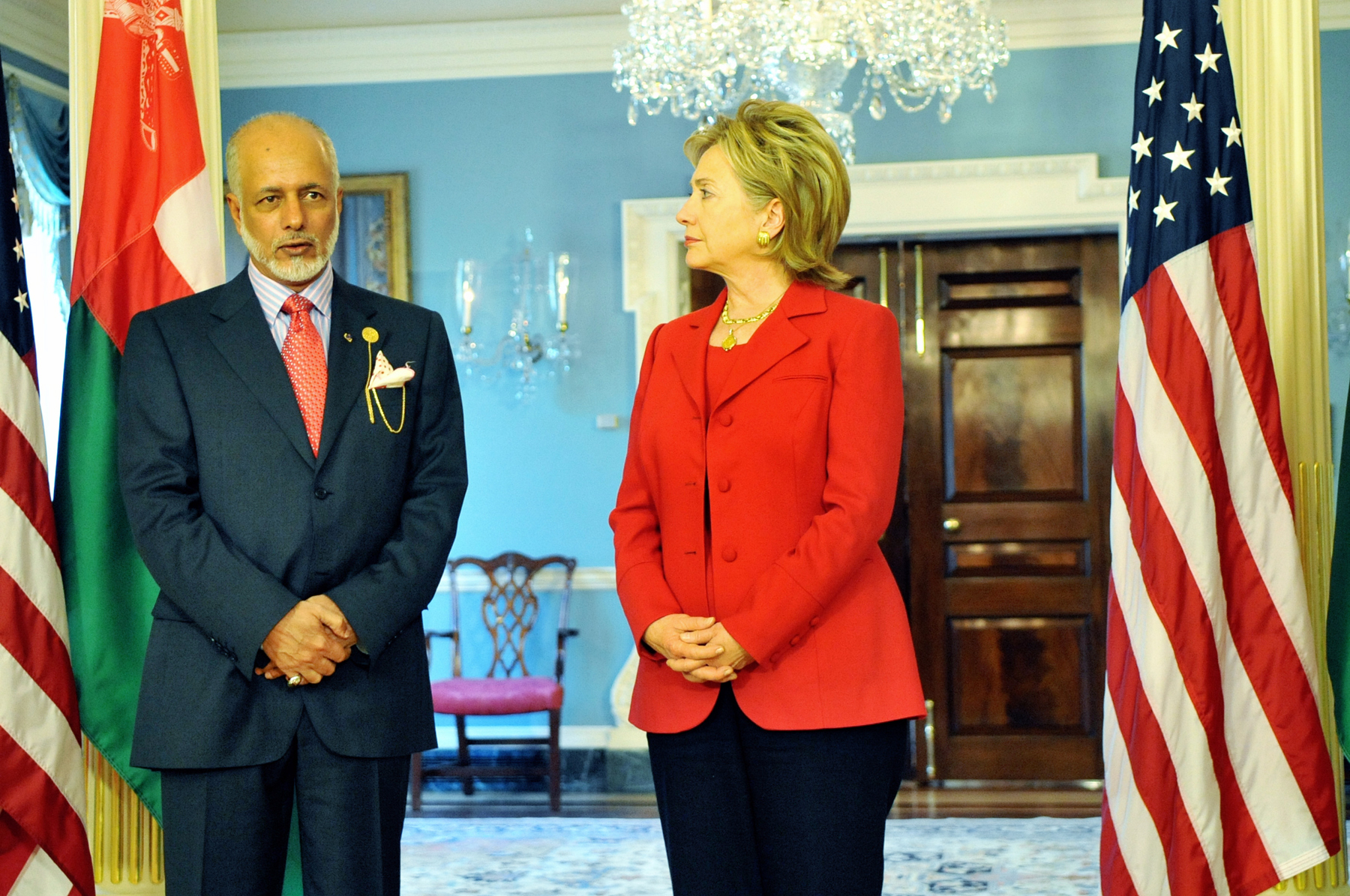

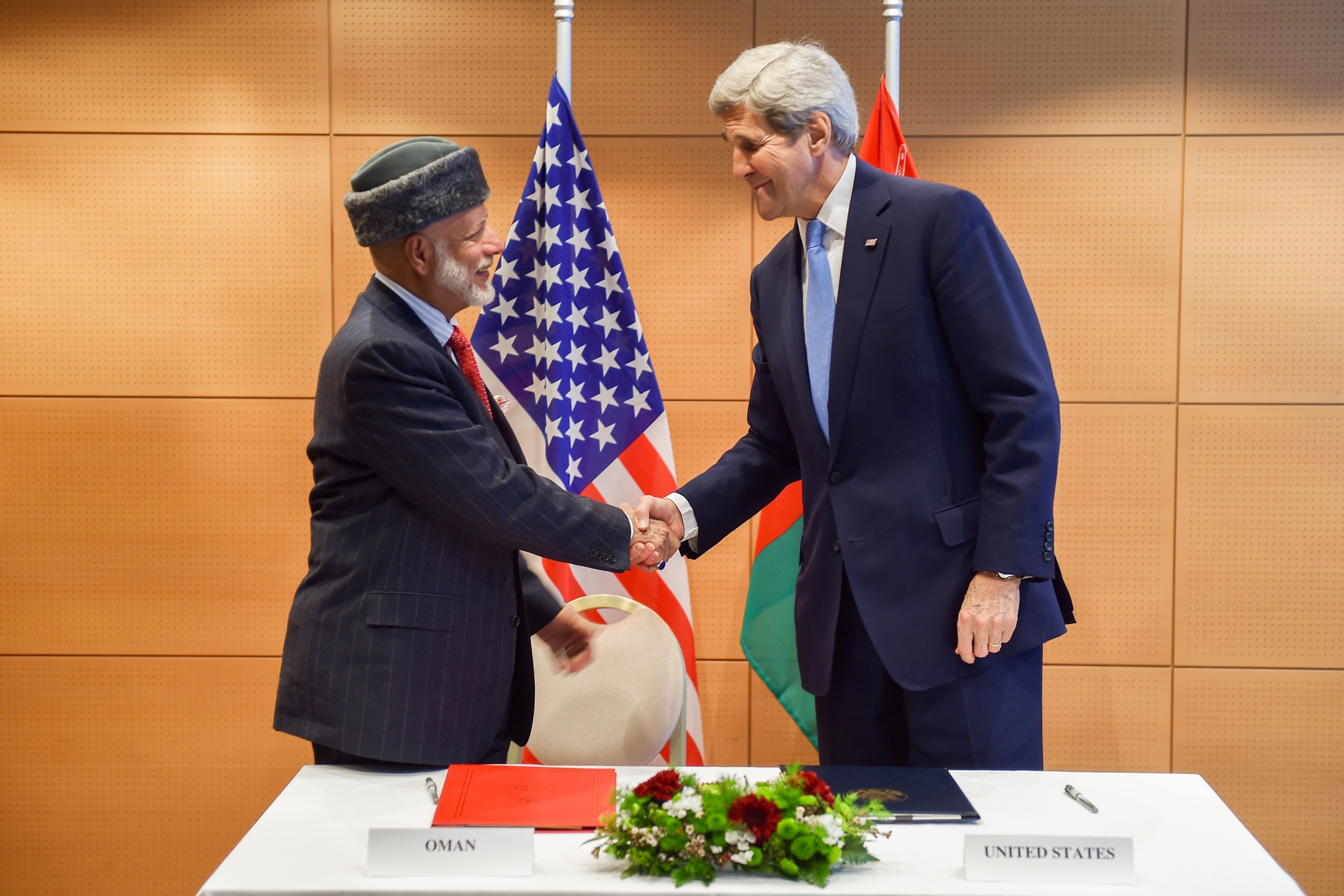

== Pakistan ==
Table of Trips
Start	End	Guest	Title	Reason
May 3, 1950	May 5, 1950	Liaquat Ali Khan	Prime Minister	Main article: State visit by Liaquat Ali Khan to the United States Official visit. Afterwards visited New York City, Chicago, San Francisco, Los Angeles, Houston, New Orleans, Schenectady, and Boston. Departed U.S. May 30.
November 13, 1953	November 8, 1953	Malik Ghulam Muhammad	Governor General	Met with President Eisenhower after obtaining medical treatment in Boston
October 14, 1954	October 21, 1954	Muhammad Ali Bogra	Prime Minister	Official guest.
June 13, 1957	June 10, 1957	Huseyn Shaheed Suhrawardy	Prime Minister	Official visit. Afterwards visited Colorado Springs, Grand Canyon, Los Angeles, San Francisco, Salt Lake City, Omaha, Detroit, and New York City. Departed U.S.July 27.
July 11, 1961	July 14, 1961	Ayub Khan	President	State visit. Addressed U.S.Congress July 12.Afterwards visited New York City, Gettysburg, San Antonio, Austin, and the LBJ Ranch. Departed U.S.July 18.
September 24, 1962	September 24, 1962	Ayub Khan	President	Informal meeting at Newport. Afterwards visited Washington, D.C. and New York City. Departed U.S. September 27.
December 14, 1965	December 16, 1965	Ayub Khan	President	State visit. Arrived in U.S.December 12; visited New York City.
October 25, 1970	October 24, 1970	Yahya Khan	President	Attended White House dinner on 25th Anniversary of the UN; met privately with President Nixon October 25.
September 18, 1973	September 20, 1973	Zulfikar Ali Bhutto	Prime Minister	Official visit. In U.S. September 17–24; visited Williamsburg, San Francisco, and New York City.
February 4, 1975	February 7, 1975	Zulfikar Ali Bhutto	Prime Minister	Official visit. Afterwards visited New York City. Departed U.S.February 8.
October 3, 1980	October 3, 1980	Zia ul-Haq	President	Private visit while attending UN General Assembly session.
December 6, 1982	December 9, 1982	Zia ul-Haq	President	State visit; visited New York City, Houston, Sacramento, and San Francisco. Departed U.S.December 14.
October 23, 1985	October 23, 1985	Zia ul-Haq	President	Met with President Reagan in New York City at reception and luncheon at the UN.
July 15, 1986	July 18, 1986	Muhammad Khan Junejo	Prime Minister	Official Visit; visited Orlando and New York City. Departed U.S.July 22.
June 5, 1989	June 7, 1989	Benazir Bhutto	President	Official Visit; visited Boston and New York City .Departed U.S.June 10.
May 27, 1994	May 23, 1994	Farooq Leghari	President	Arrived in U.S.May 21; departed June 1. Also visited Rochester.Met with President Bill Clinton during a private visit. Later visited New York City.
April 9, 1995	April 11, 1995	Benazir Bhutto	Prime Minister	Official working visit. Arrived in the U.S.April 5; also visited New York City and Los Angeles. Departed the U.S. April 14.
September 22, 1997	September 22, 1997	Nawaz Sharif	Prime Minister	Met with President Clinton at the UN General Assembly in New York City.
September 21, 1998	September 21, 1998	Nawaz Sharif	Prime Minister	Met with President Clinton at the UN General Assembly in New York City.
December 1, 1998	December 1, 1998	Nawaz Sharif	Prime Minister	Official working visit.
July 4, 1999	July 5, 1999	Nawaz Sharif	Prime Minister	Discussed the Kashmir crisis with President Bill Clinton during a private visit.
November 10, 2001	November 10, 2001	Pervez Musharraf	President	Met with President Bush at the UN General Assembly in New York City.
February 12, 2002	February 14, 2002	Pervez Musharraf	President	Official Working Visit.
September 12, 2002	September 12, 2002	Pervez Musharraf	President	Met with President Bush at the UN General Assembly in New York City.
June 23, 2003	June 27, 2003	Pervez Musharraf	President	Working visit. Met with President Bush in Washington, D.C. and Camp David, MD.Arrived in Boston June 20; later visited Los Angeles.
September 24, 2003	September 24, 2003	Pervez Musharraf	President	Met with President Bush at the UN General Assembly in New York City.
September 30, 2003	October 4, 2003	Mir Zafarullah Khan Jamali	Prime Minister	Working visit.
September 21, 2004	September 22, 2004	Pervez Musharraf	President	Met with President Bush at the UN General Assembly in New York City.
October 3, 2004	October 4, 2004	Pervez Musharraf	President	Working visit.
December 22, 2006	December 24, 2006	Shaukat Aziz	Prime Minister	Working visit. Arrived in the U.S. January 19; also visited New York City and Boston.
September 20, 2006	September 22, 2006	Pervez Musharraf	President	Working visit.
September 27, 2006	September 27, 2006	Pervez Musharraf	President	Also met with Afghan President Hamid Karzai on September 27.
July 27, 2008	July 30, 2008	Yousaf Raza Gilani	Prime Minister	Working visit.
September 23, 2008	September 23, 2008	Asif Ali Zardari	President	Met with President Bush at the UN General Assembly in New York City.
May 6, 2009	May 6, 2009	Asif Ali Zardari	President	Working Visit.
September 24, 2009	September 25, 2009	Asif Ali Zardari	President	Attended a meeting of the Friends of Democratic Pakistan Summit in New York City
April 11, 2010	April 13, 2010	Yousaf Raza Gilani	Prime Minister	Attended the Nuclear Security Summit
January 14, 2011	January 14, 2011	Asif Ali Zardari	President	Attended the Richard Holbrooke Memorial Service.
May 21, 2012	May 21, 2012	Asif Ali Zardari	President	Met with President Obama at the NATO Summit meeting in Chicago .
October 20, 2013	October 23, 2013	Nawaz Sharif	Prime Minister	Working visit.
October 22, 2015	October 22, 2015	Nawaz Sharif	Prime Minister	Official Working Visit.
July 21, 2019	July 23, 2019	Imran Khan	Prime Minister	Official Working Visit.
September 25, 2025	September 25, 2025	Shehbaz Sharif	Prime Minister	Official Working Visit.

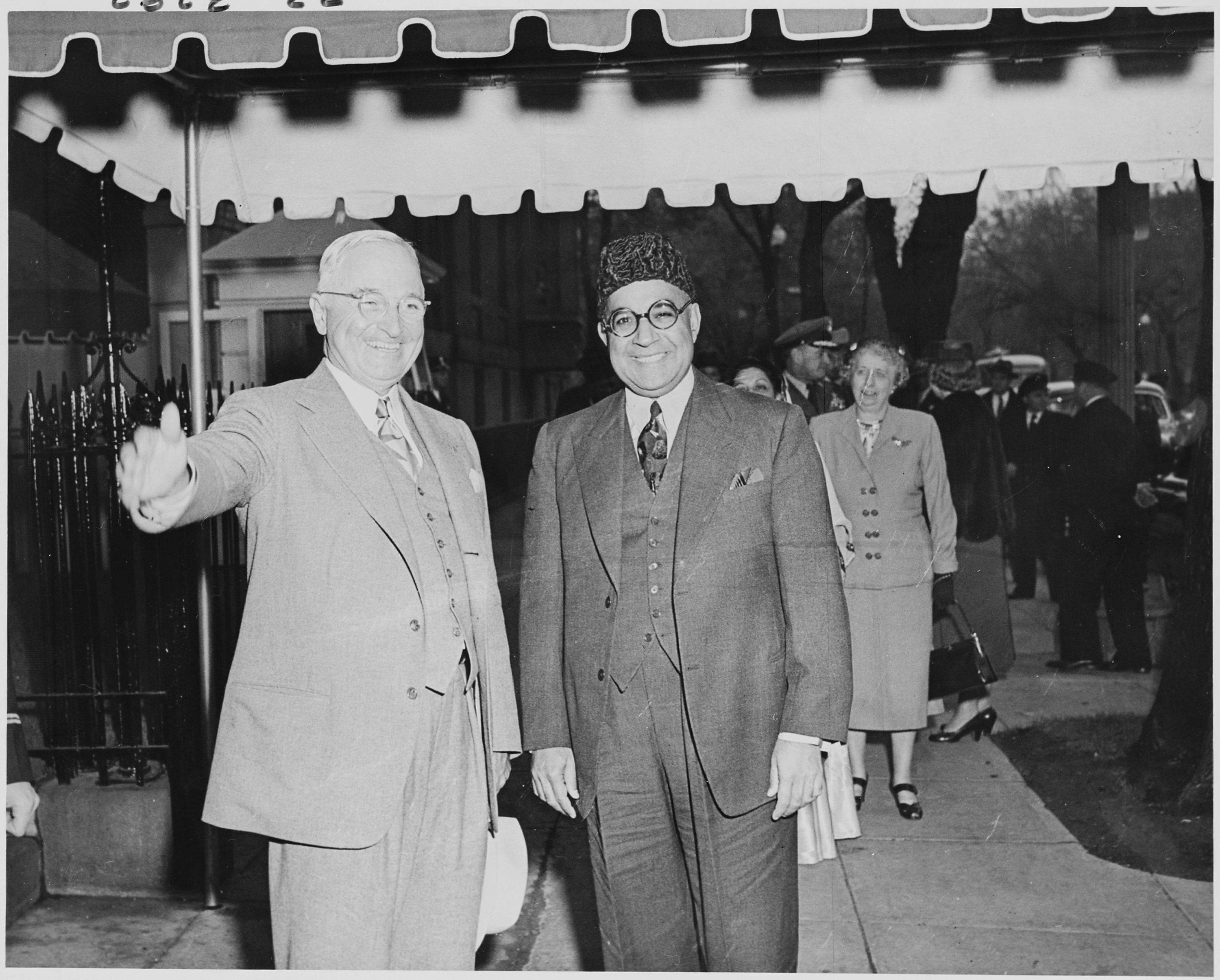

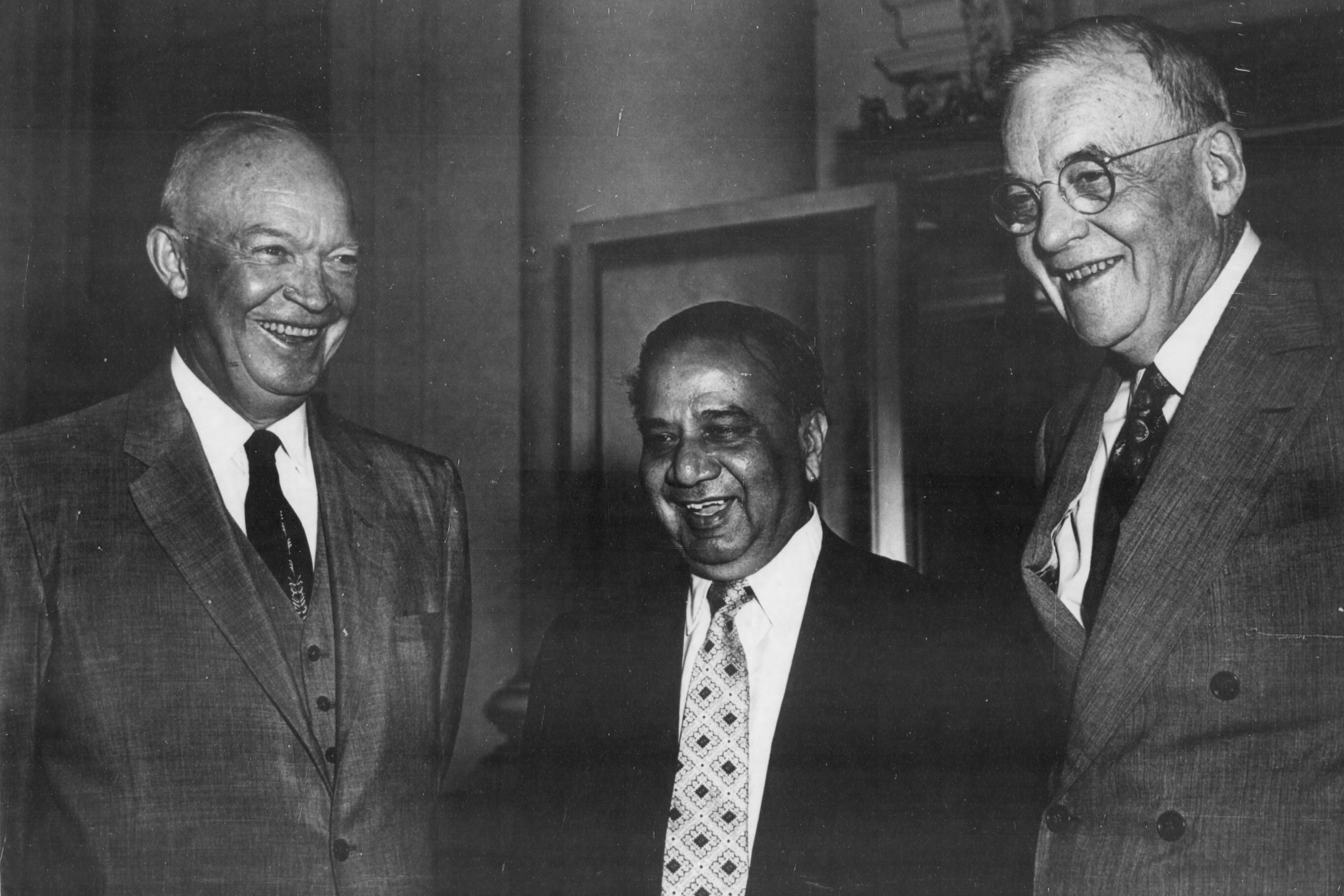

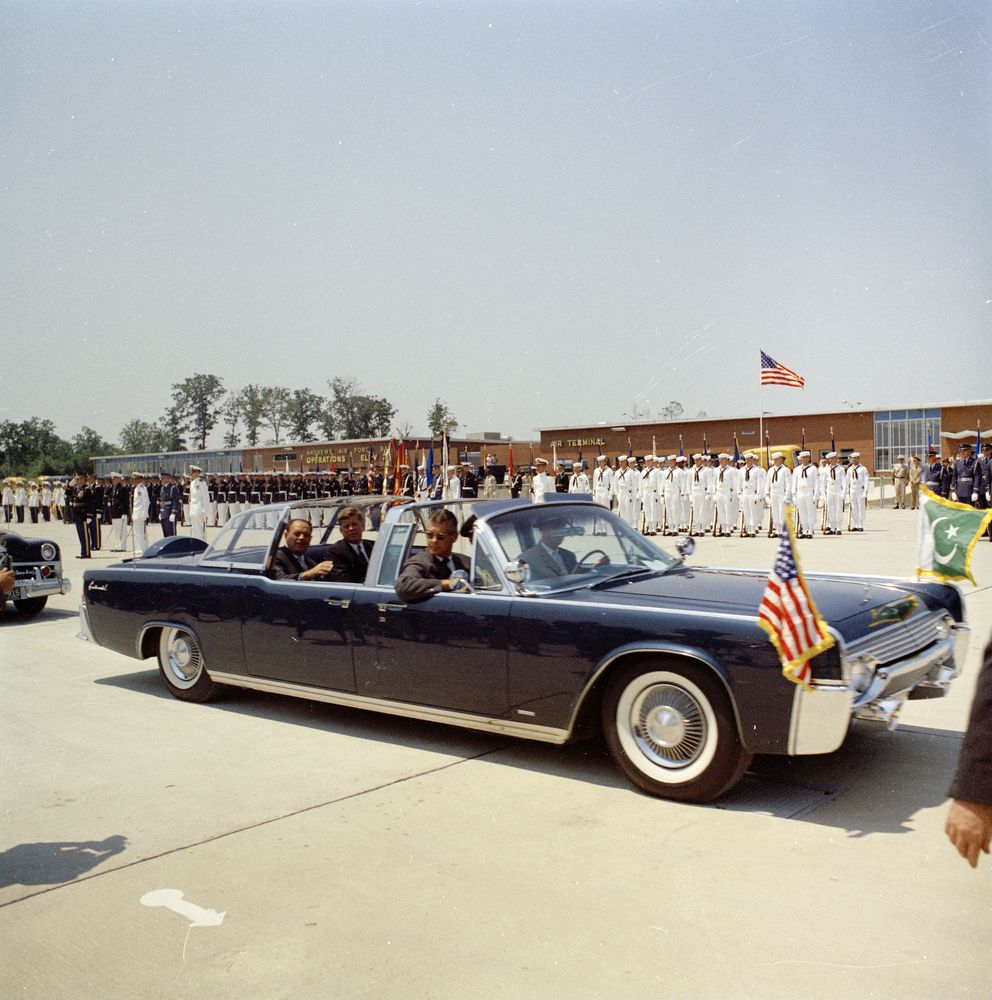

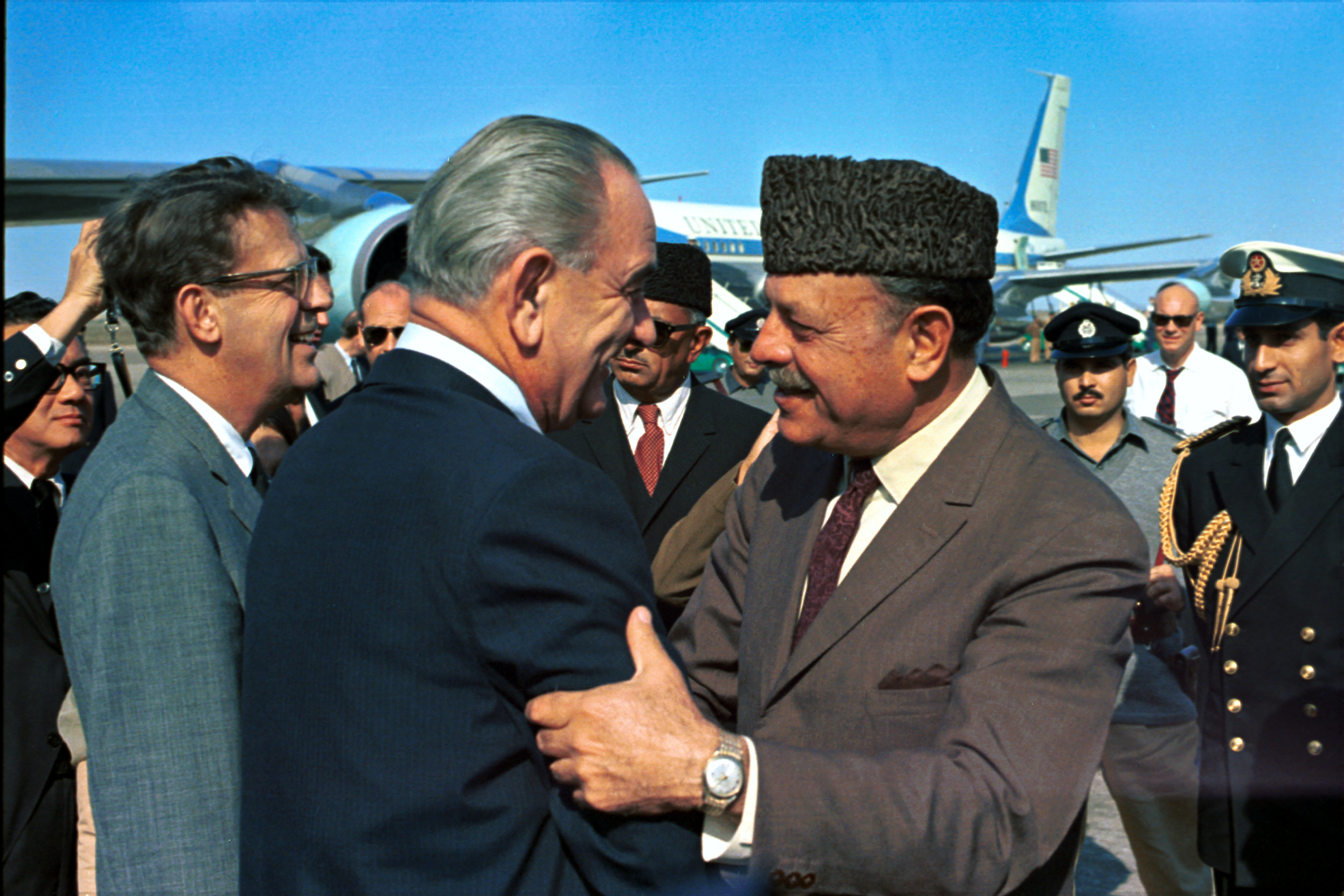

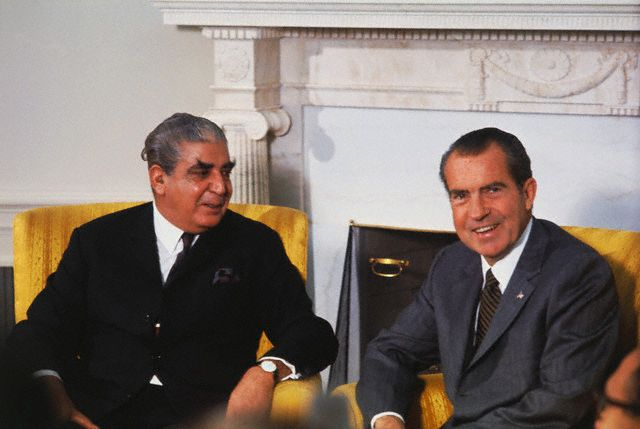

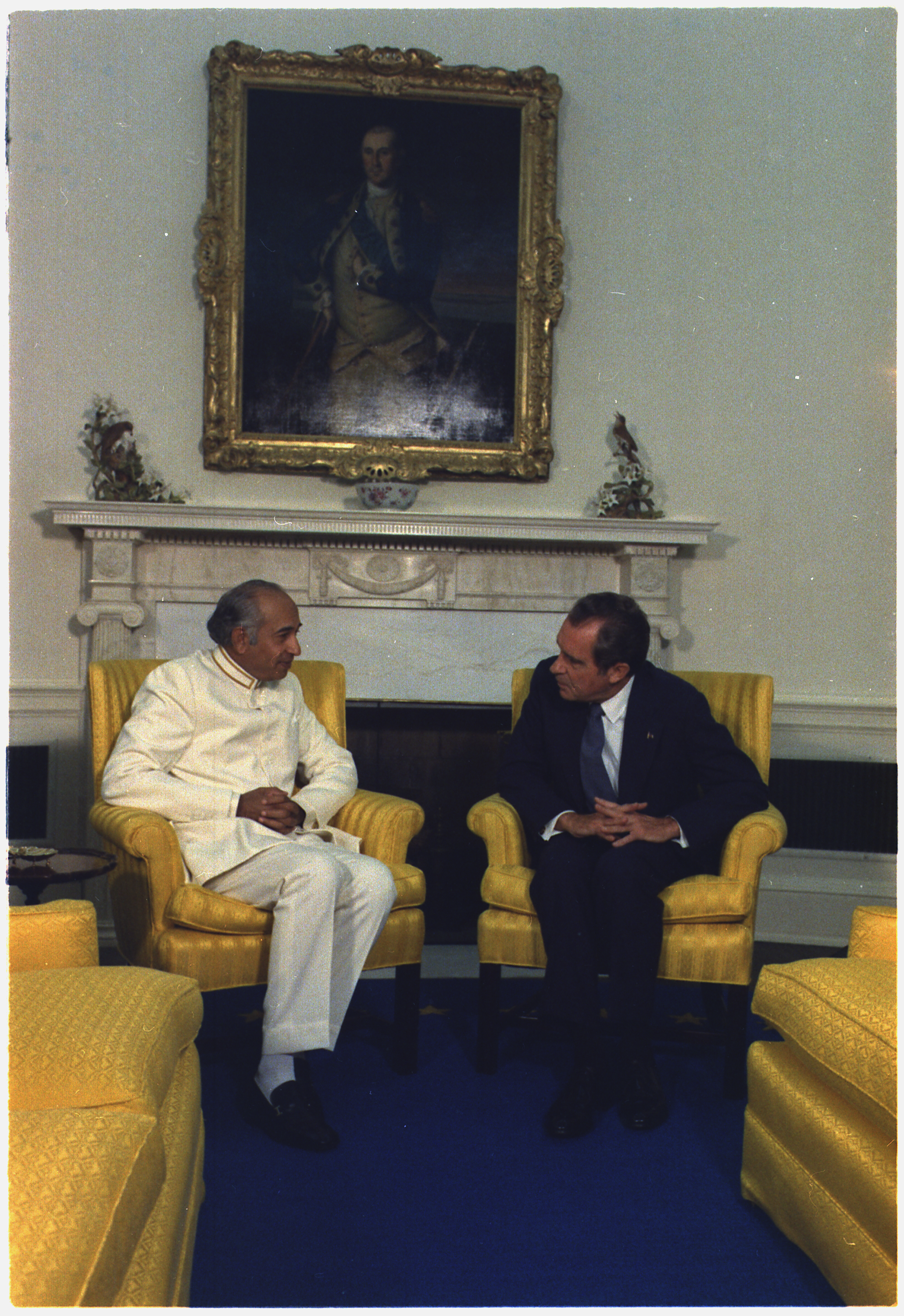

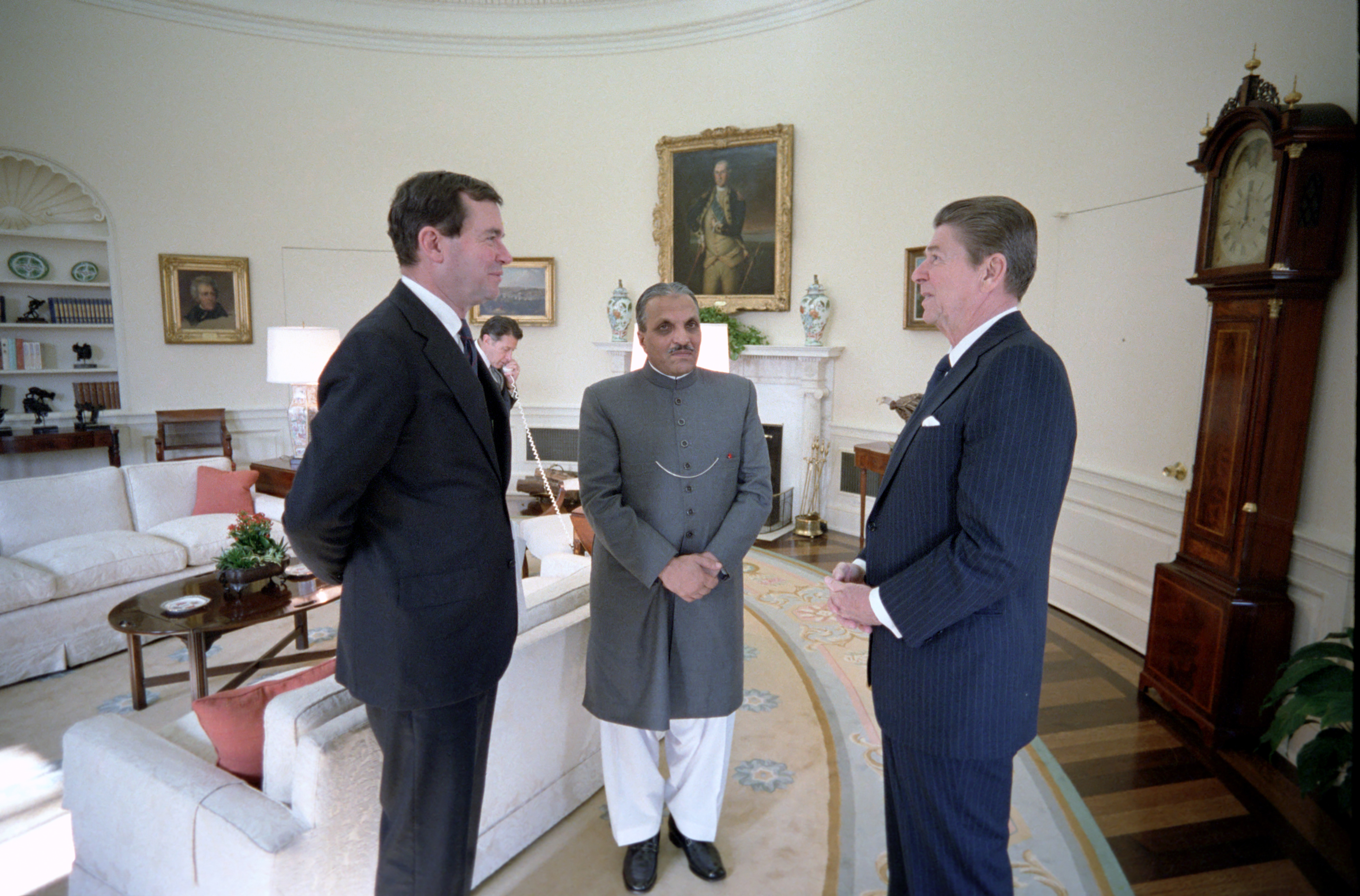

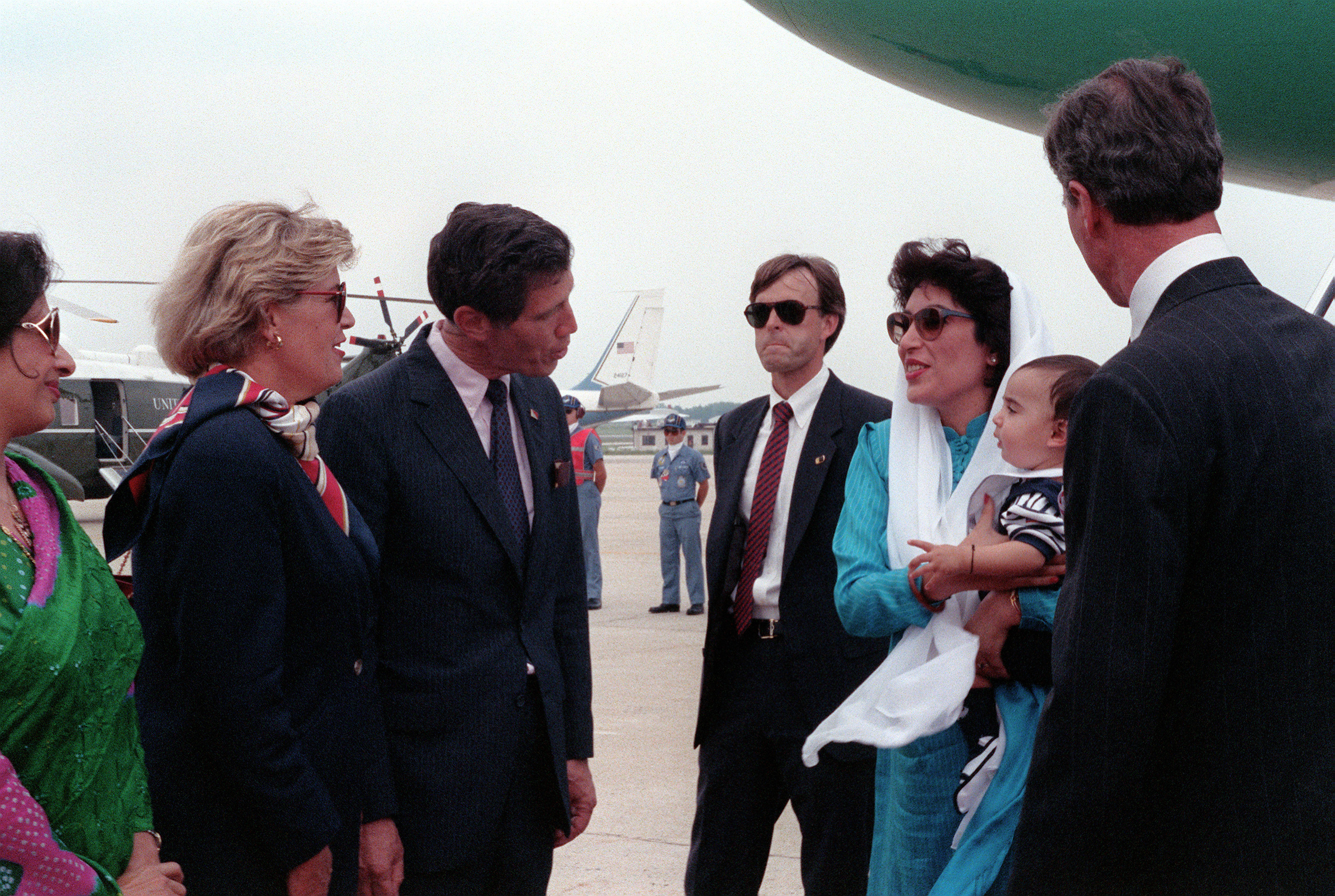

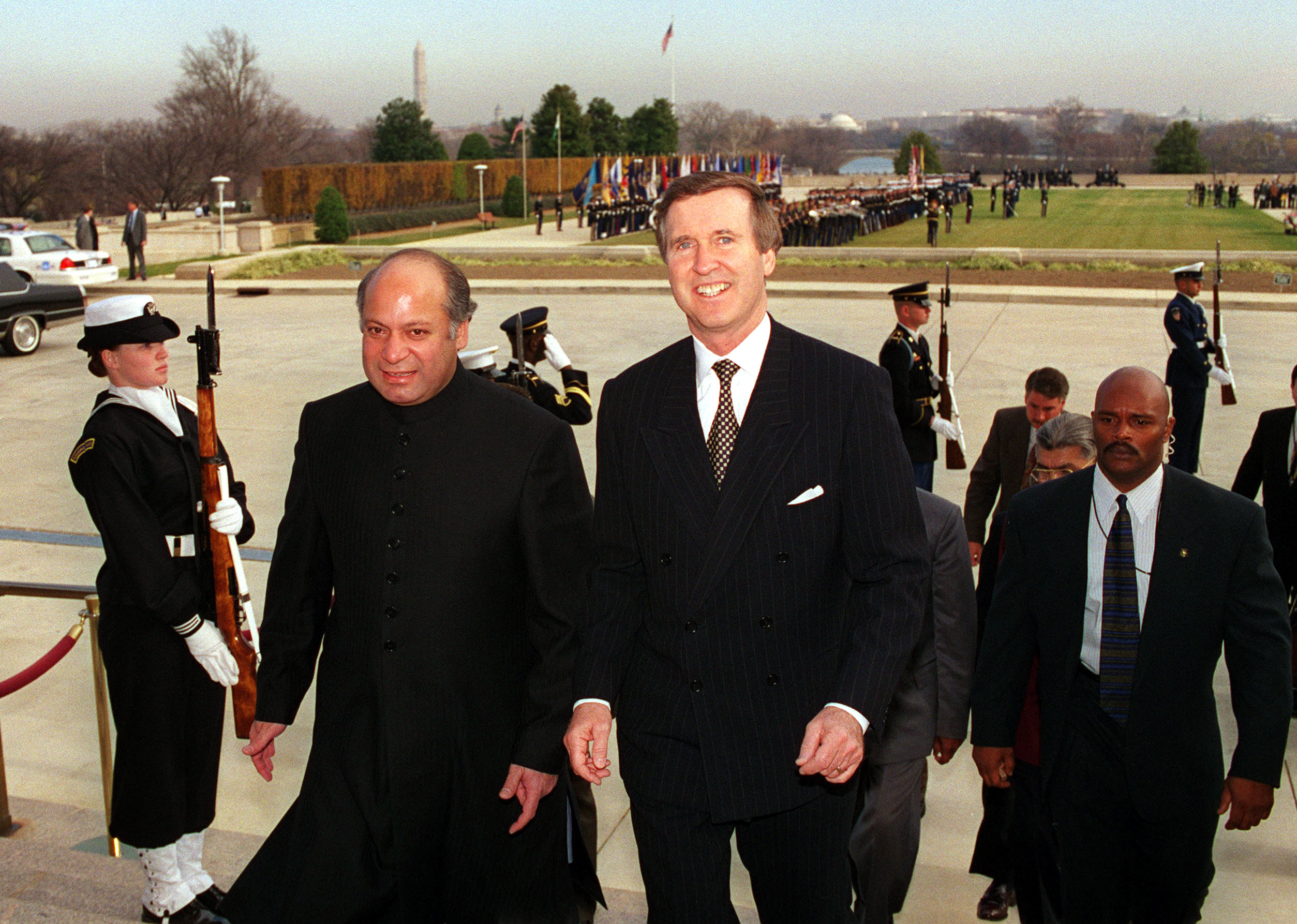

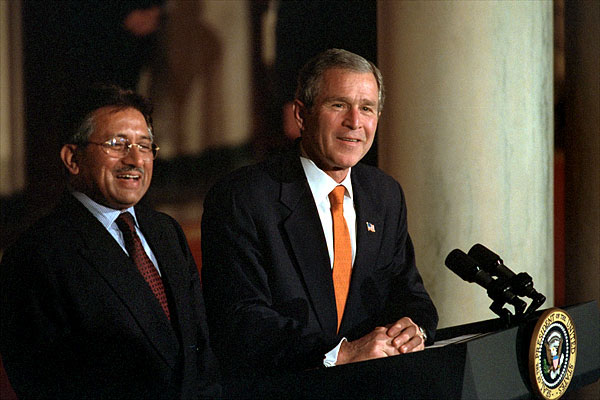

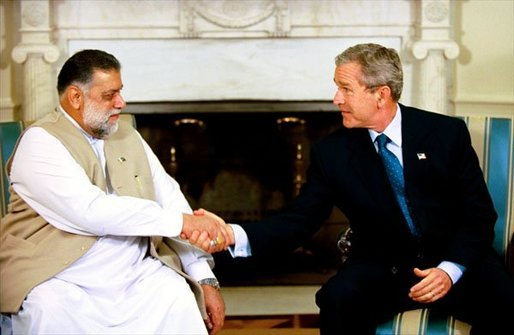

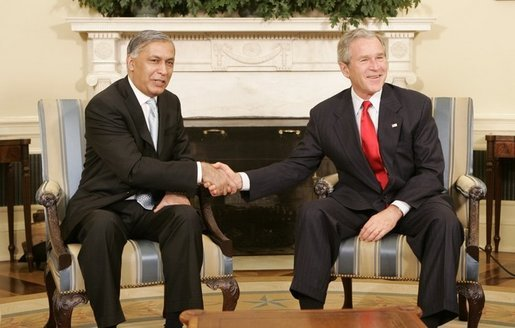

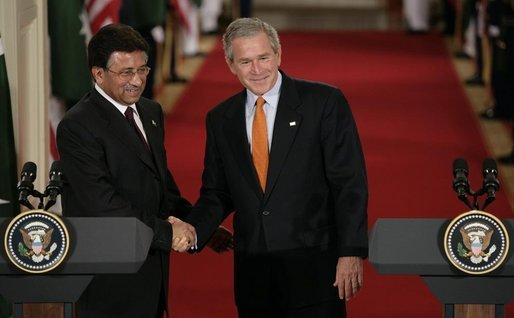

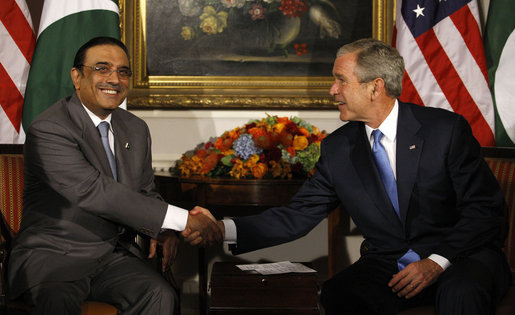

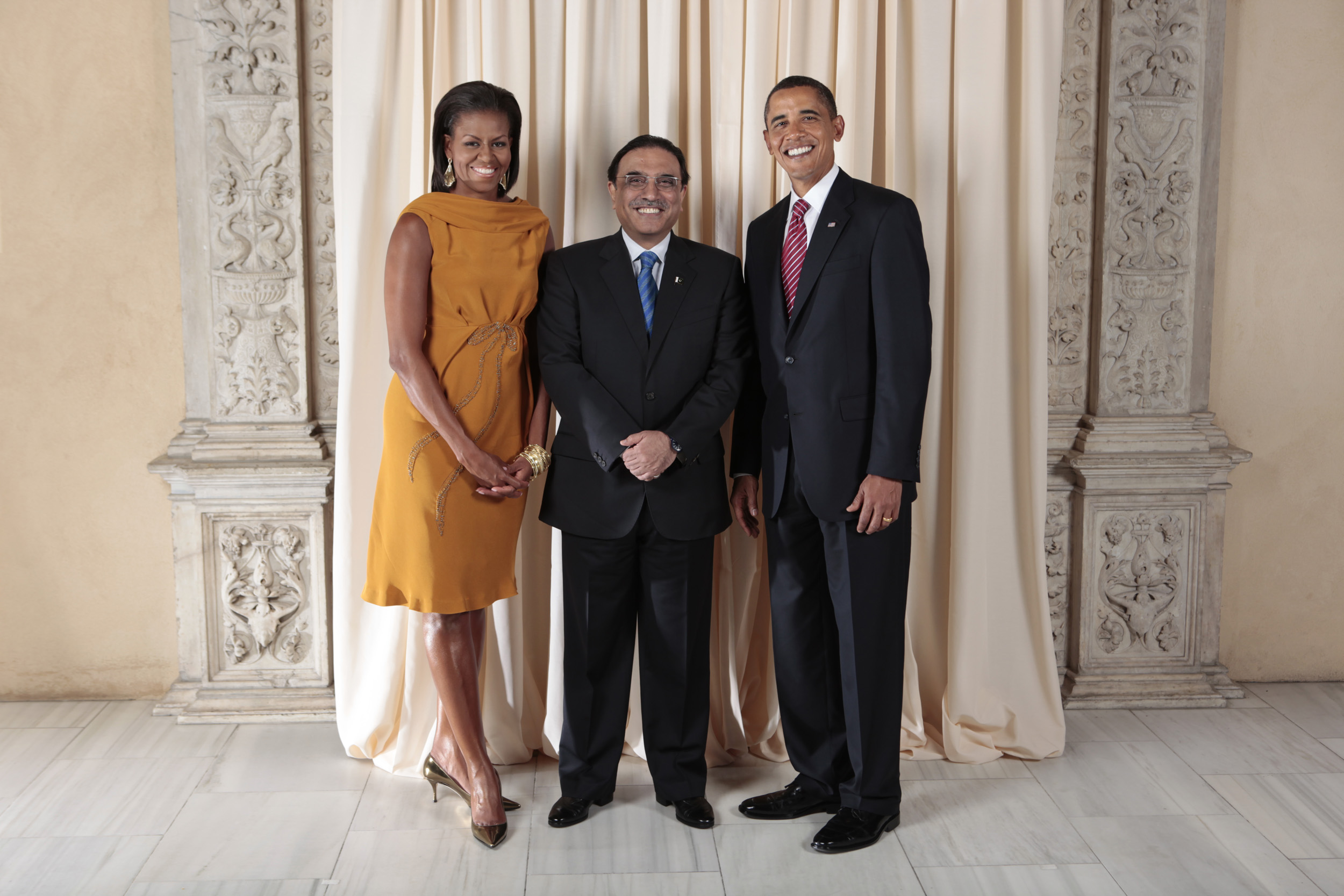

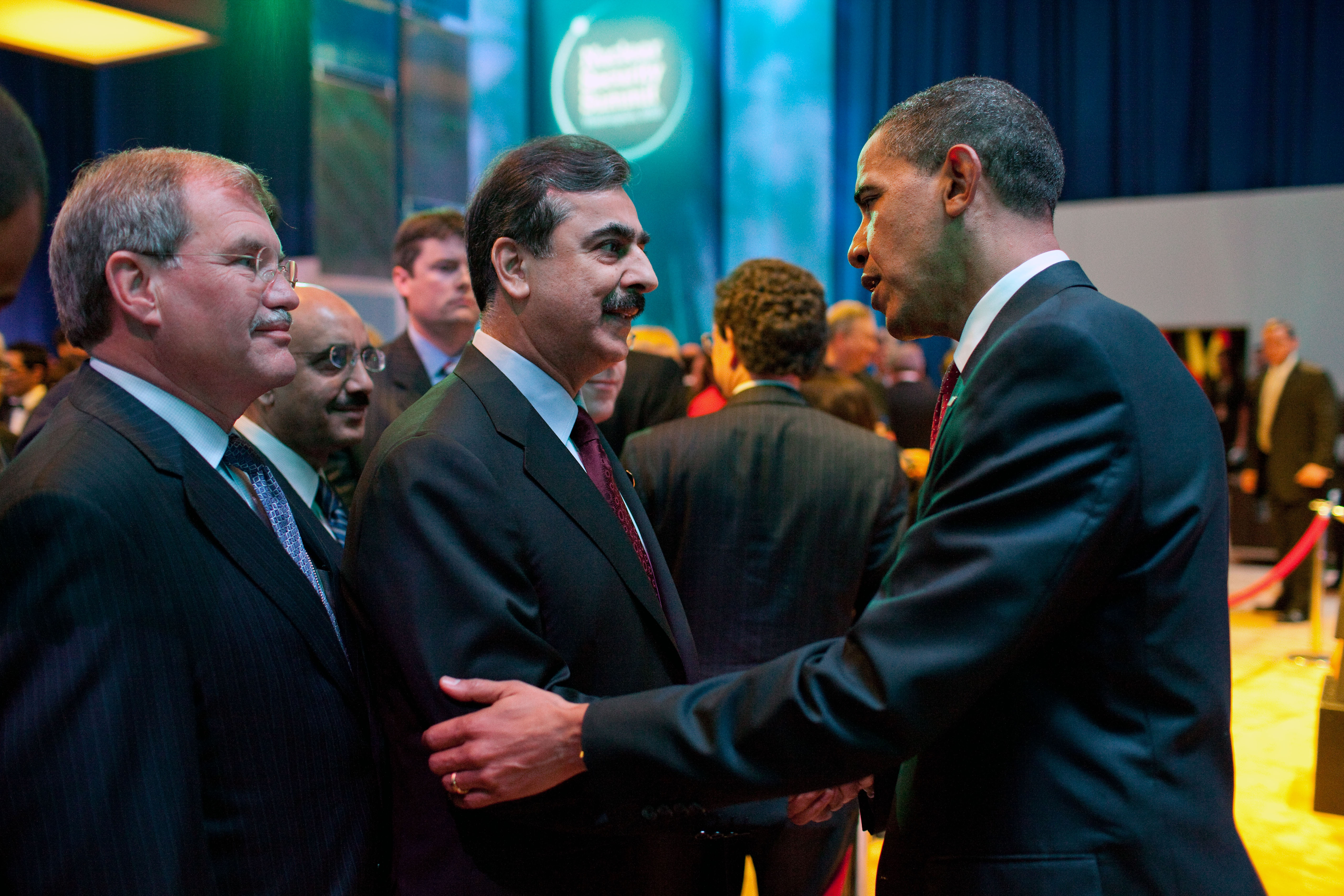

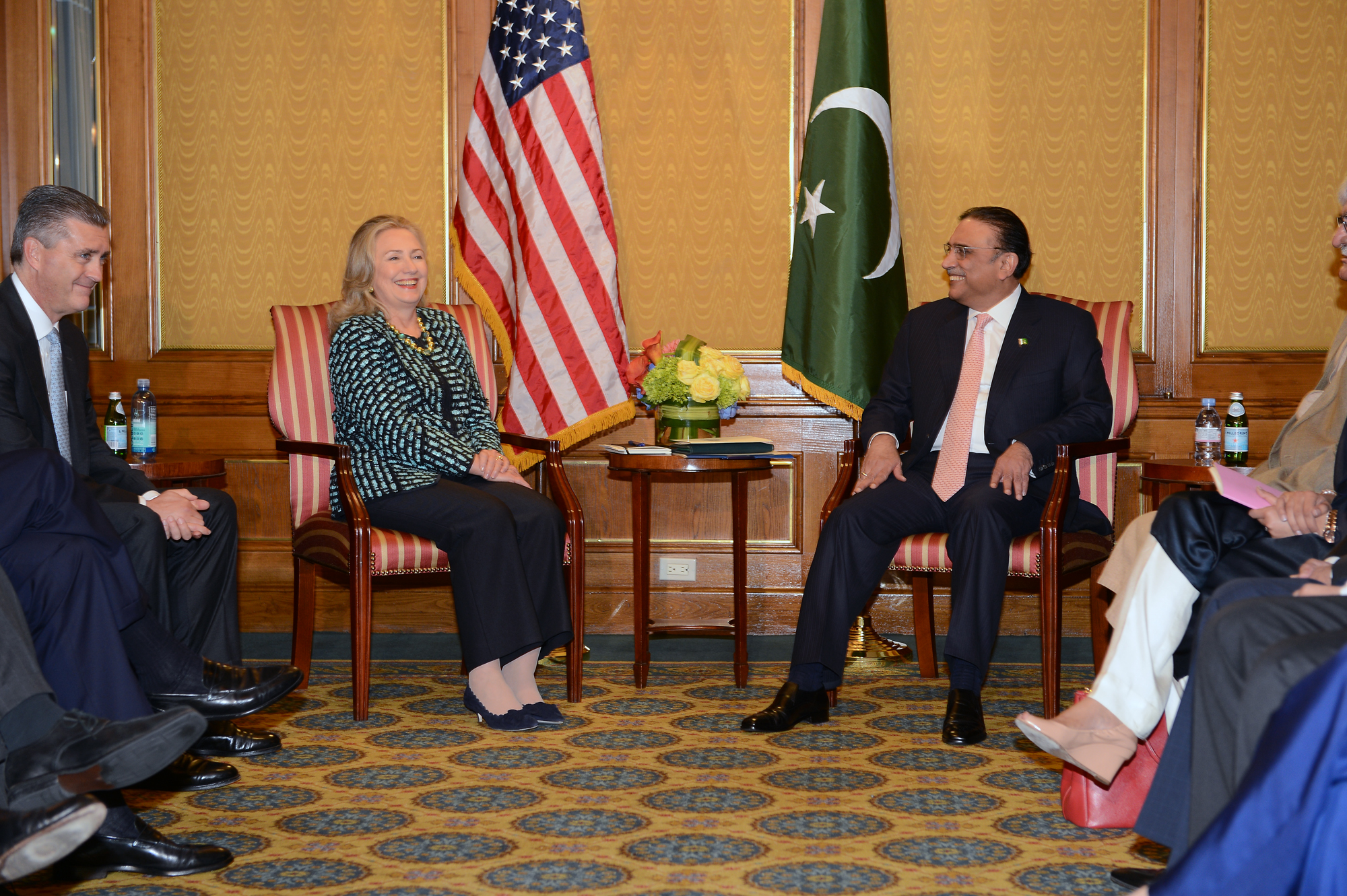

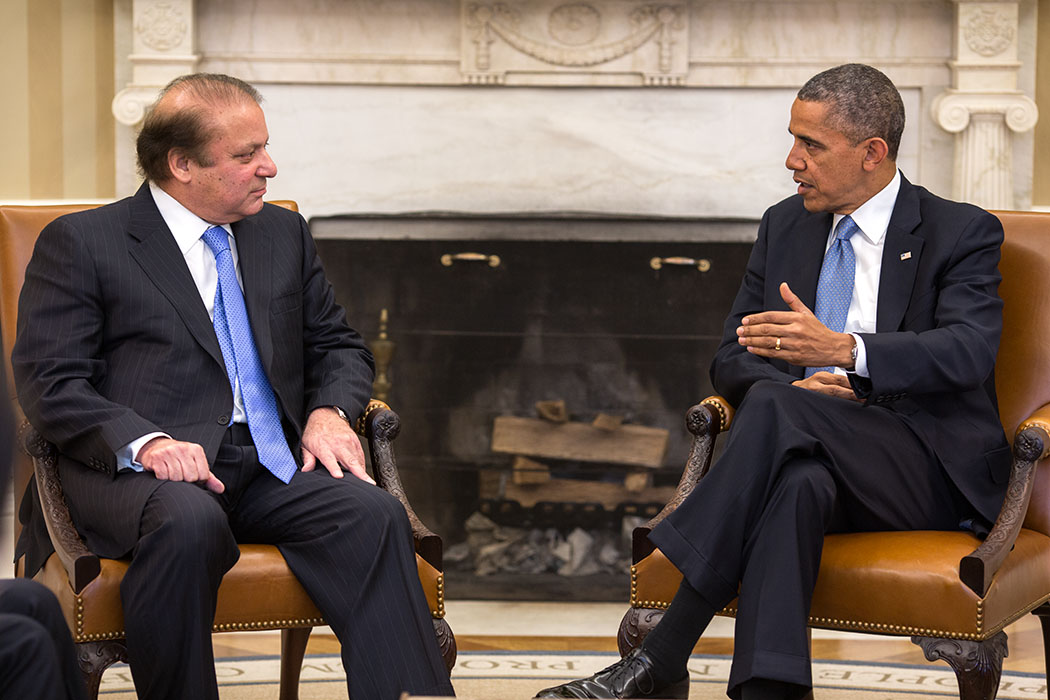

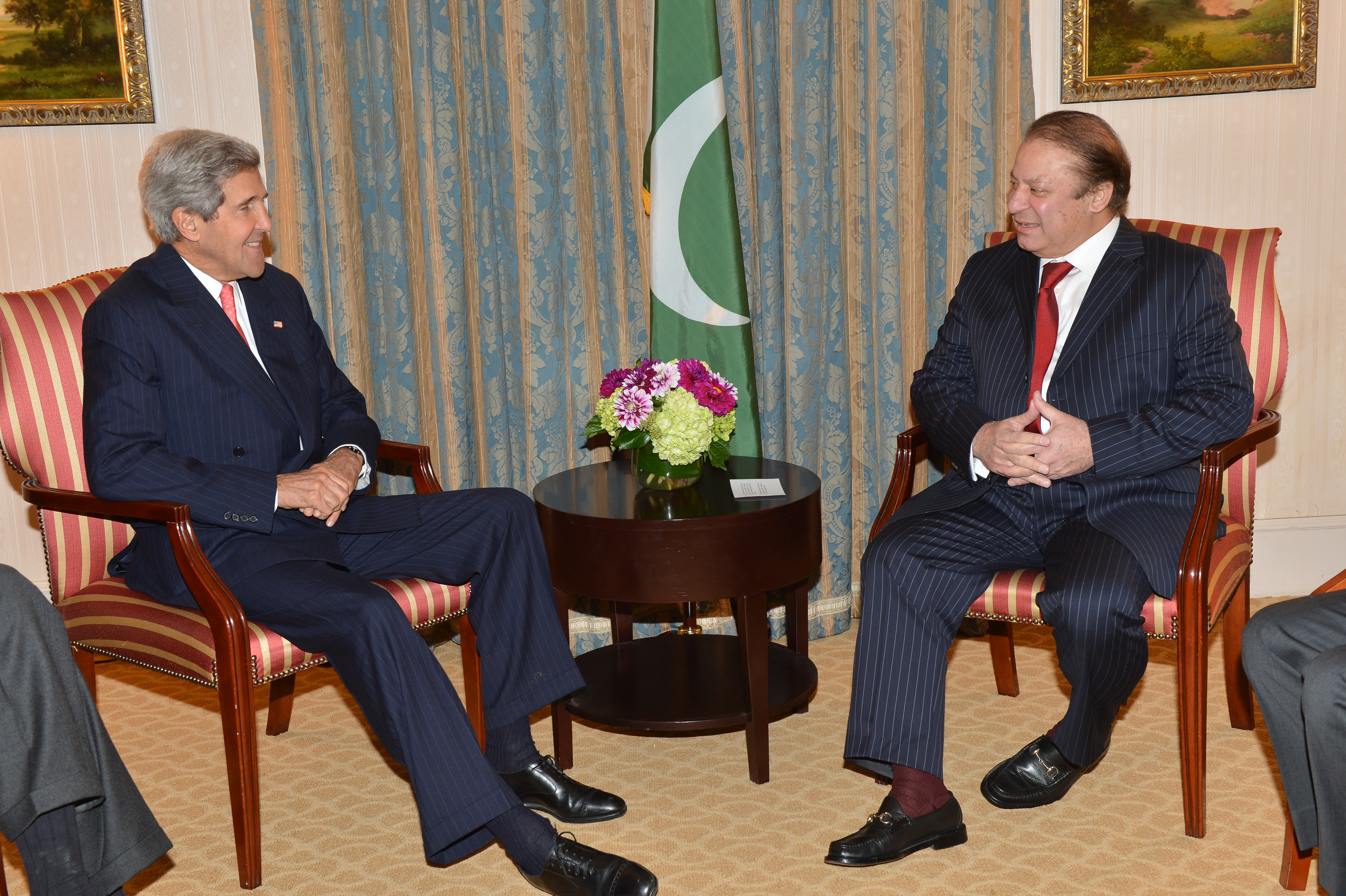

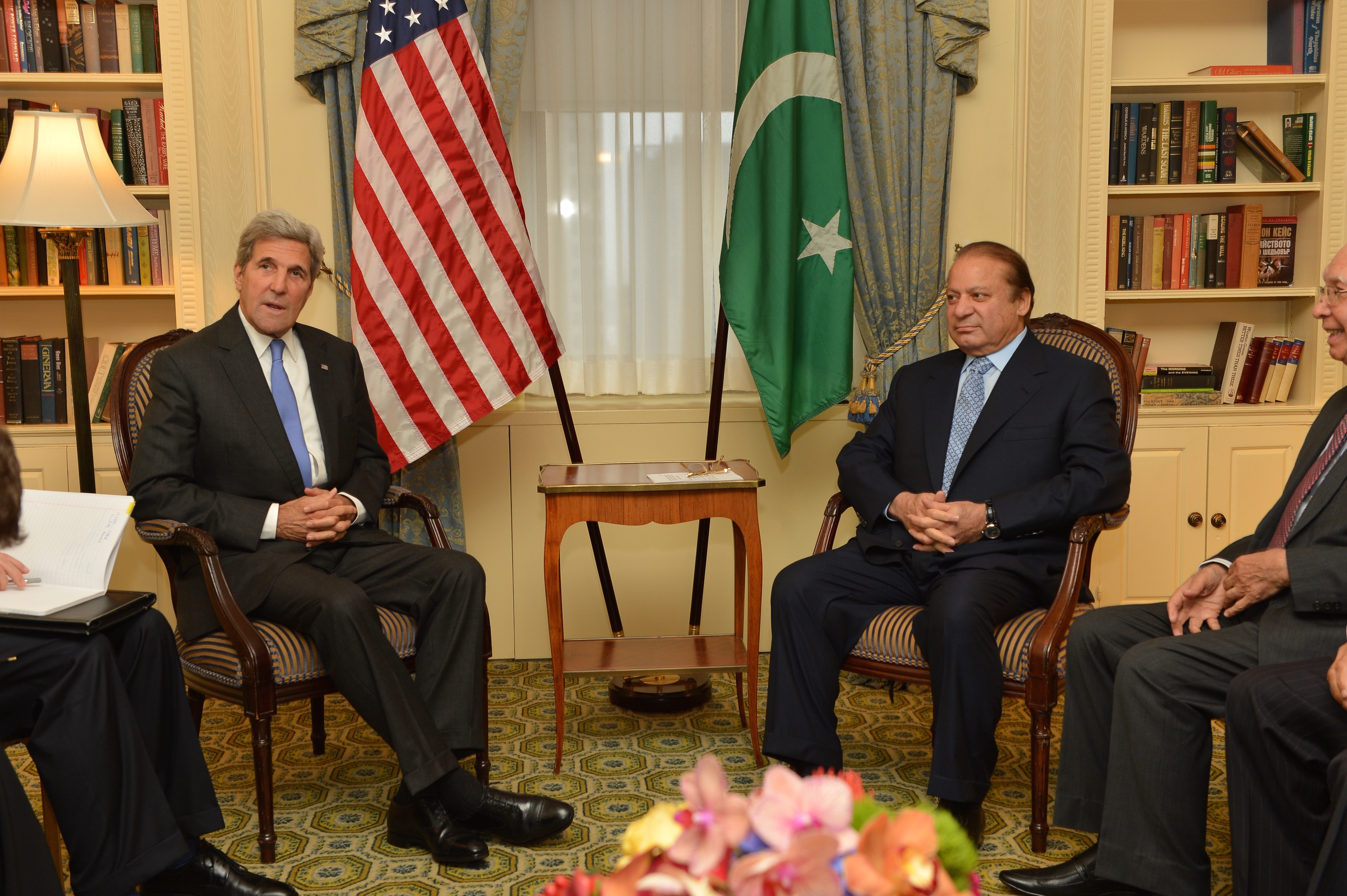

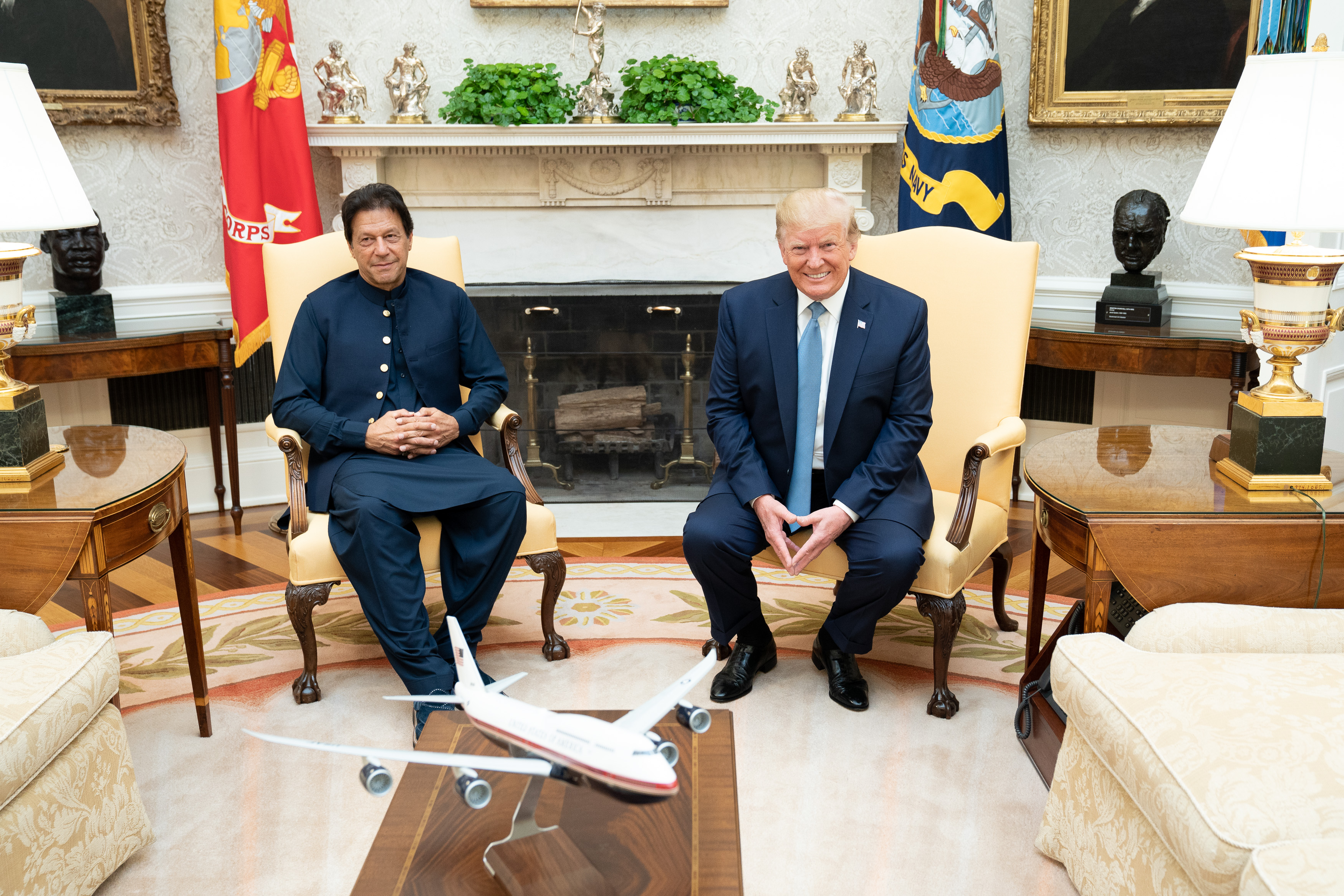

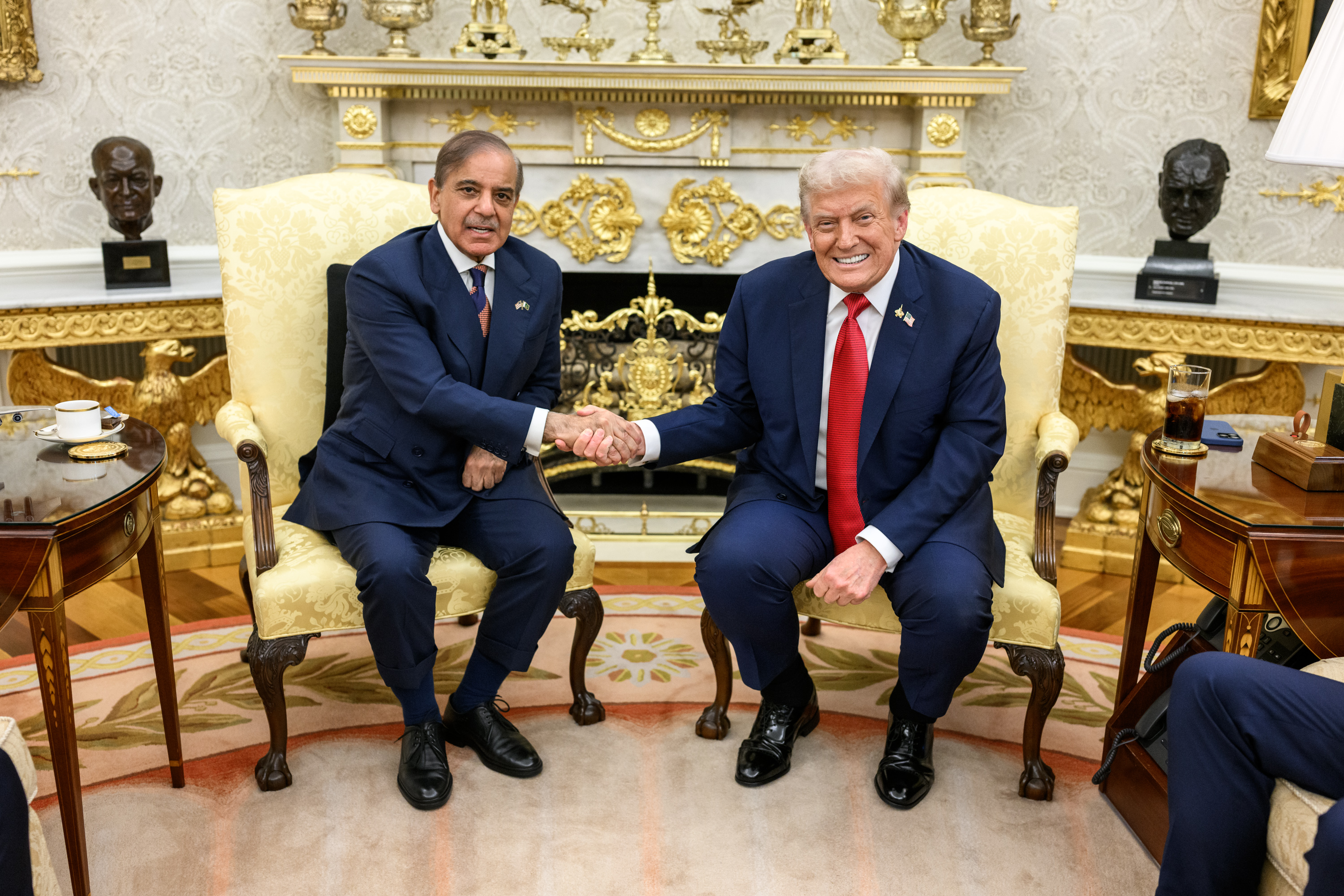

== Philippines ==
Table of Trips
Dates	Guest	Title	Reason
May 9–17, 1946	Manuel Roxas	President	Guest of U.S. government. Discussed matters relating to Philippine independence from the U.S. Also visited San Francisco.
August 8–11, 1949	Elpidio Quirino	President	Joint discussions on economic cooperation.
February 1, 1950	Elpidio Quirino	President	Met with President Harry S. Truman after receiving medical treatment in Baltimore.
August 30, 1951	Elpidio Quirino	President	Signed a security treaty.
August 15–24, 1953	Elpidio Quirino	President	Private visit to Washington, D.C. after medical treatment in Baltimore.
June 17–20, 1958	Carlos P. Garcia	President	State visit on June 15–17. Addressed joint session of U.S. Congress on June 18. Also visited Chicago, New York City, Phoenix, Los Angeles and San Francisco.
November 24–25, 1963	Diosdado Macapagal	President	Attended funeral of President John F. Kennedy.
October 5–6, 1964	Diosdado Macapagal	President	State visit on October 3–15. Also visited Honolulu, San Francisco, Williamsburg, Pittsburgh, New York City, and Los Angeles.
September 14–16, 1966	Ferdinand Marcos	President	State visit on September 12–27. Addressed joint session of U.S. Congress on September 15. Also visited Honolulu, Los Angeles, New York City, Chicago, Ann Arbor, and San Francisco.
March April 31 – 1, 1969	Ferdinand Marcos	President	Attended funeral of former President Dwight D. Eisenhower; met with President Richard Nixon on April 1.
September 15–20, 1982	Ferdinand Marcos	President	State visit; visited New York City. Private visit afterward.
September 15–19, 1986	Corazon Aquino	President	Official working visit. Later visited San Francisco, New York City, and Boston. Addressed joint session of U.S. Congress on September 18.
November 7–10, 1989	Corazon Aquino	President	State visit; visited Dallas and Los Angeles.
November 11–23, 1993	Fidel Ramos	President	Attended Asia-Pacific Economic Cooperation meeting in Seattle; visited Washington, D.C. on November 22–23. Also visited San Francisco, Los Angeles, Chicago, New York City, and Houston.
April 8–10, 1998	Fidel Ramos	President	Working visit.
July 26–28, 2000	Joseph Estrada	President	Official working visit.
November 18–20, 2001	Gloria Macapagal Arroyo	President	Working visit.
May 17–21, 2003	Gloria Macapagal Arroyo	President	State visit. Arrived in Los Angeles on May 17.
June 24, 2008	Gloria Macapagal Arroyo	President	Working visit.
July 30, 2009	Gloria Macapagal Arroyo	President	Working visit.
April 12–13, 2010	Gloria Macapagal Arroyo	President	Attended the Nuclear Security Summit.
September 20–26, 2010	Benigno Aquino III	President	Addressed the 65th session of the United Nations General Assembly. Also met with business leaders in San Francisco.
September 18–21, 2011	Benigno Aquino III	President	Working visit. Attended the launching of the Open Government Partnership in New York City. Delivered a public lecture at a meeting with the World Bank Group and the International Monetary Fund in Washington, D.C. Met with Senator Daniel Inouye of Hawaii.
November 10–13, 2011	Benigno Aquino III	President	Attended the Asia-Pacific Economic Cooperation Summit in Honolulu and Kapolei, Hawaii.
June 8–10, 2012	Benigno Aquino III	President	Working visit. Met with President Barack Obama at the White House.
September 20–24, 2014	Benigno Aquino III	President	Working visit. Attended the United Nations Climate Summit in New York City. Delivered a speech at the John F. Kennedy School of Government at Harvard University in Cambridge, Massachusetts. Met with businesses in San Francisco.
May 6–7, 2014	Benigno Aquino III	President	Working visit to Chicago.
February 15–17, 2016	Benigno Aquino III	President	Attended the ASEAN Leaders Summit at Sunnylands.
September 22, 2022	Bongbong Marcos	President	Met with President Joe Biden at the UN General Assembly Meeting in New York City.
May 4, 2023	Bongbong Marcos	President	Official Working Visit.
November 12–17, 2023	Bongbong Marcos	President	Attended the APEC Leaders' Summit at San Francisco, California.
April 11, 2024	Bongbong Marcos	President	Working Visit.
July 20–22, 2025	Bongbong Marcos	President	Official Visit. Met with President Donald Trump at the White House in Washington, D.C. Marcos also met separately with Defense Secretary Pete Hegseth at the Pentagon, CIA director John Ratcliffe, and Secretary of State Marco Rubio at the Harry S Truman Building.

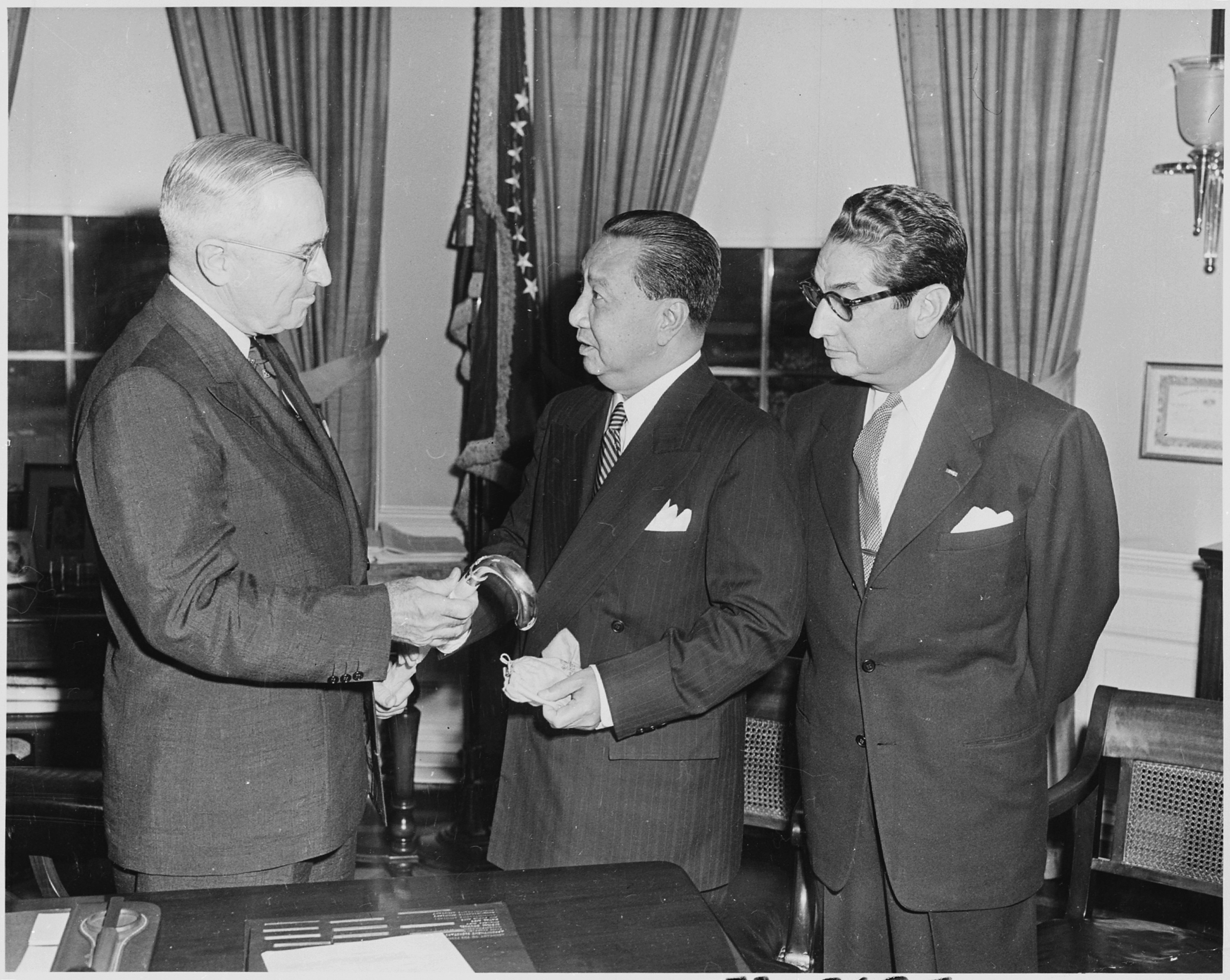

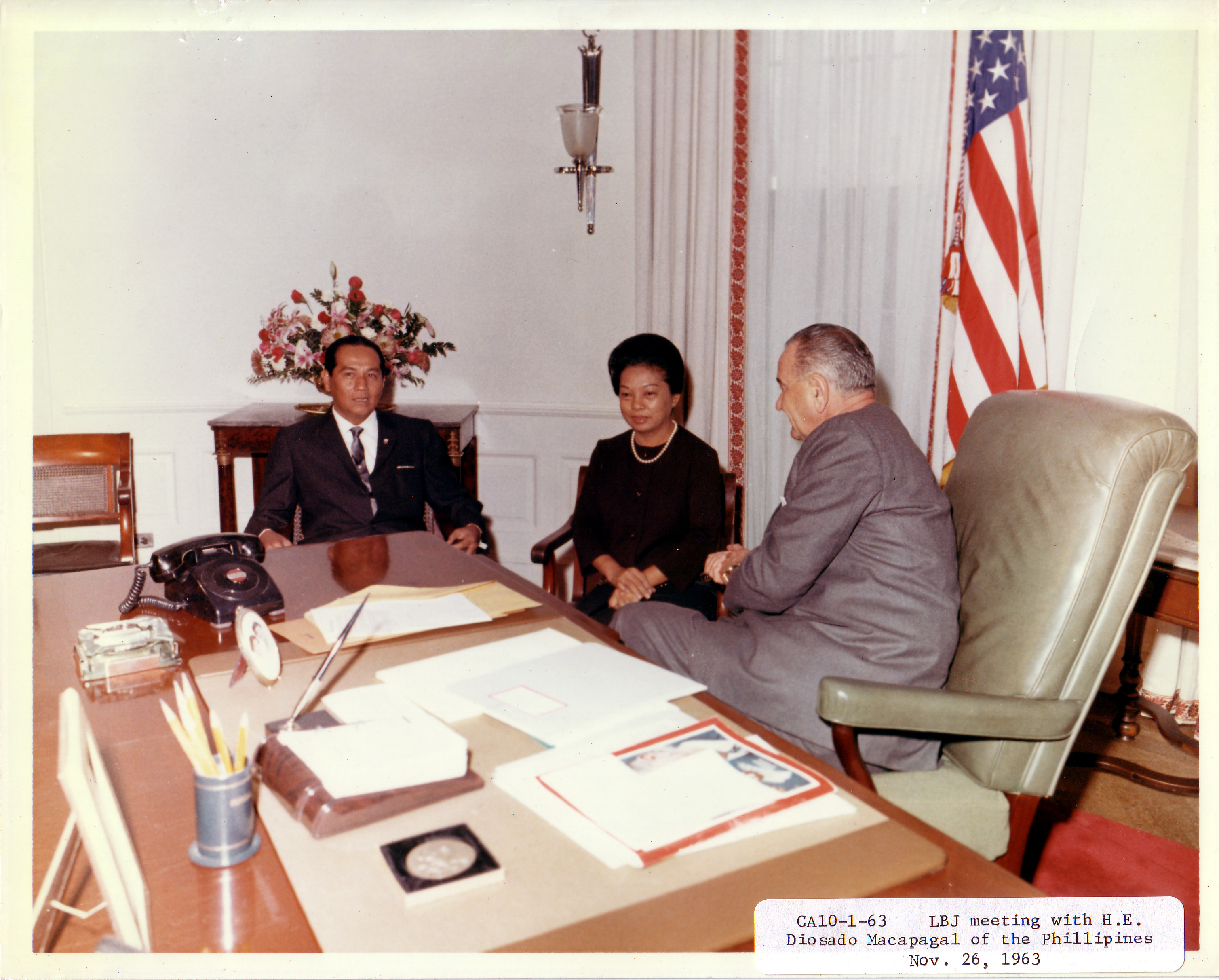

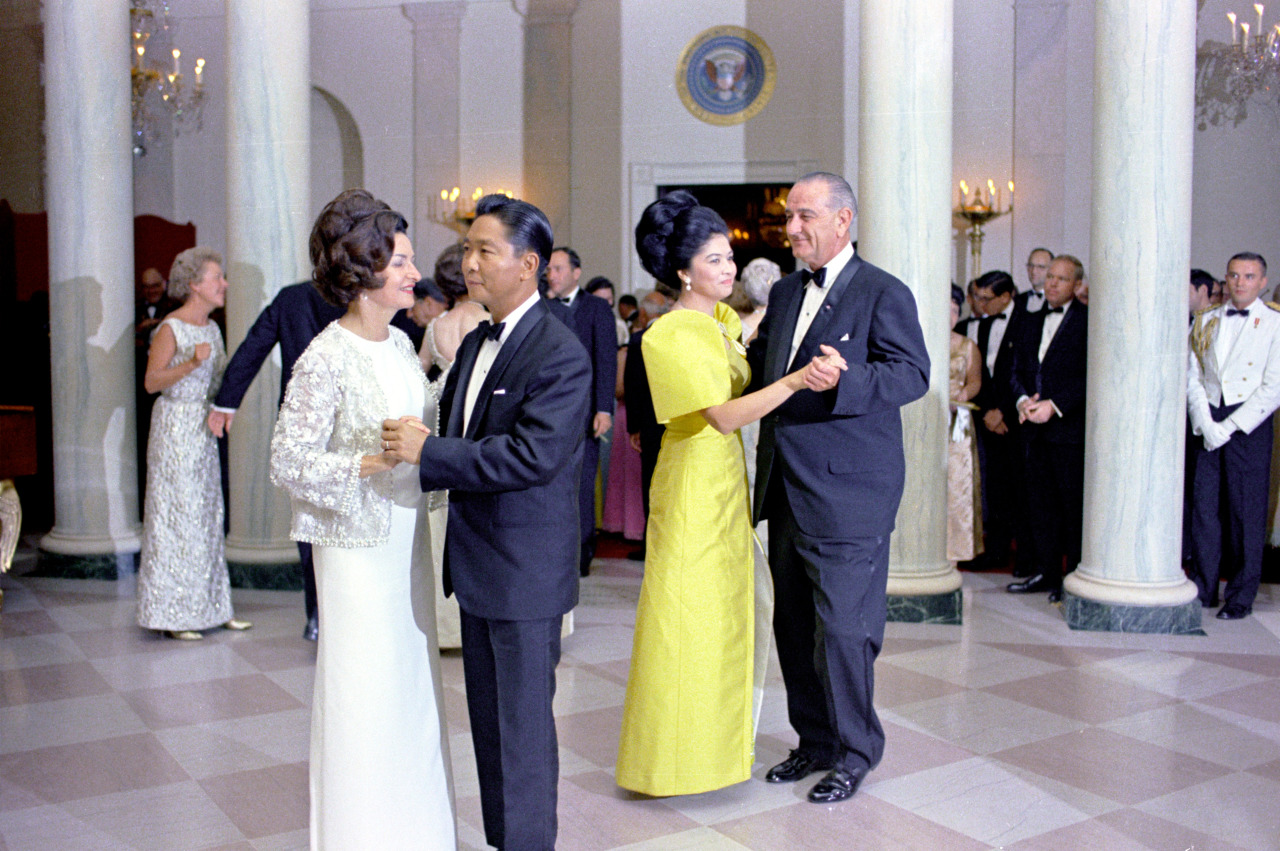

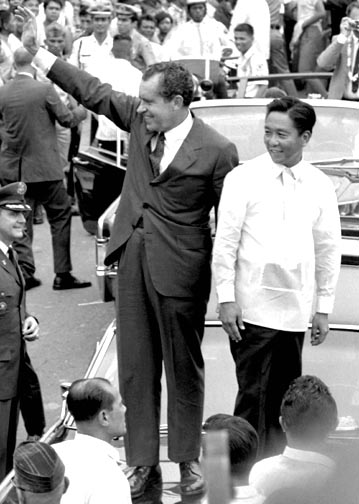

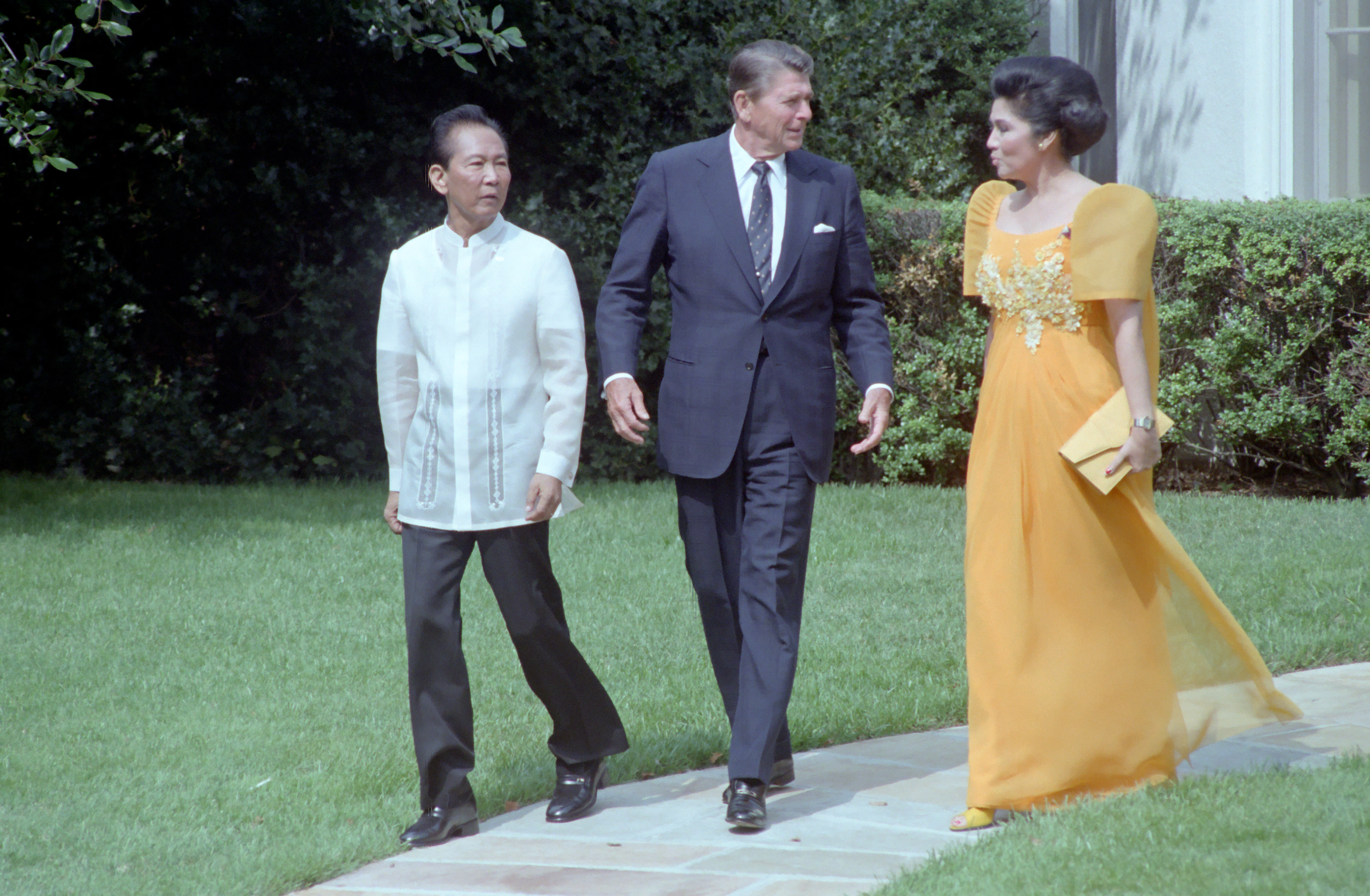

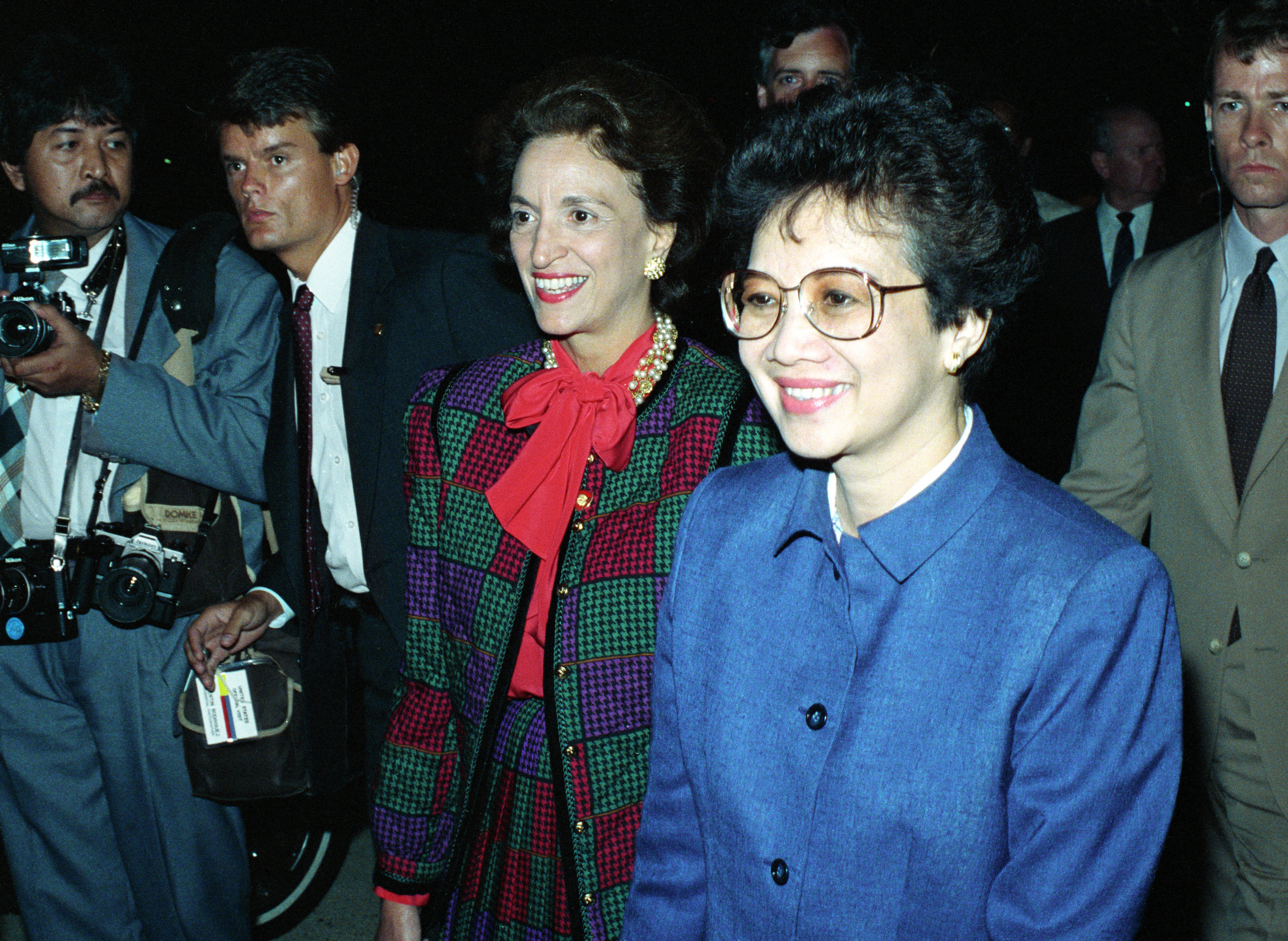

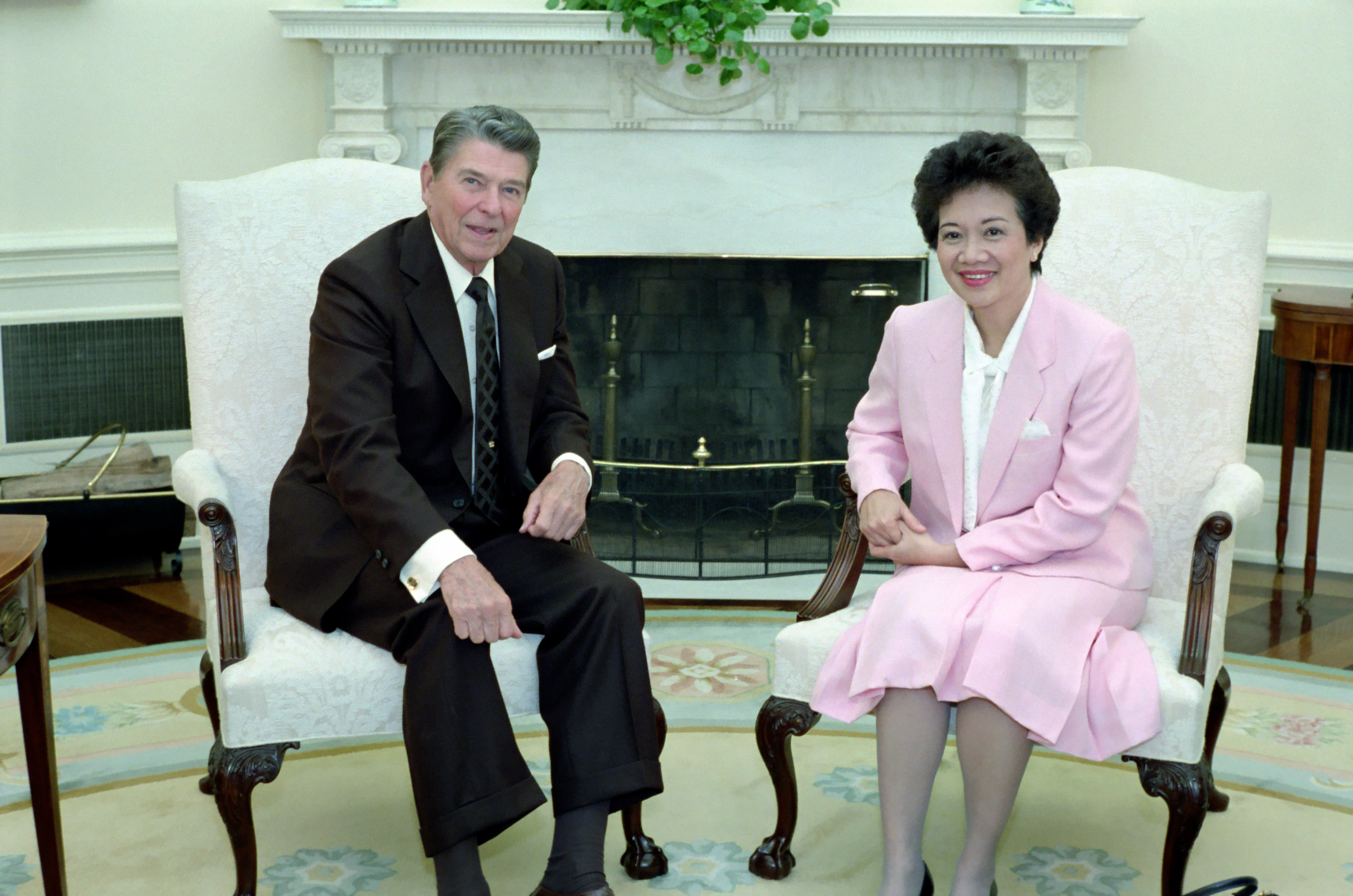

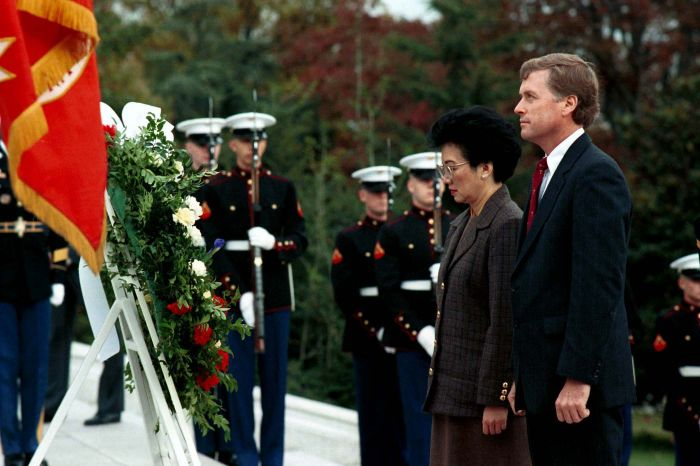

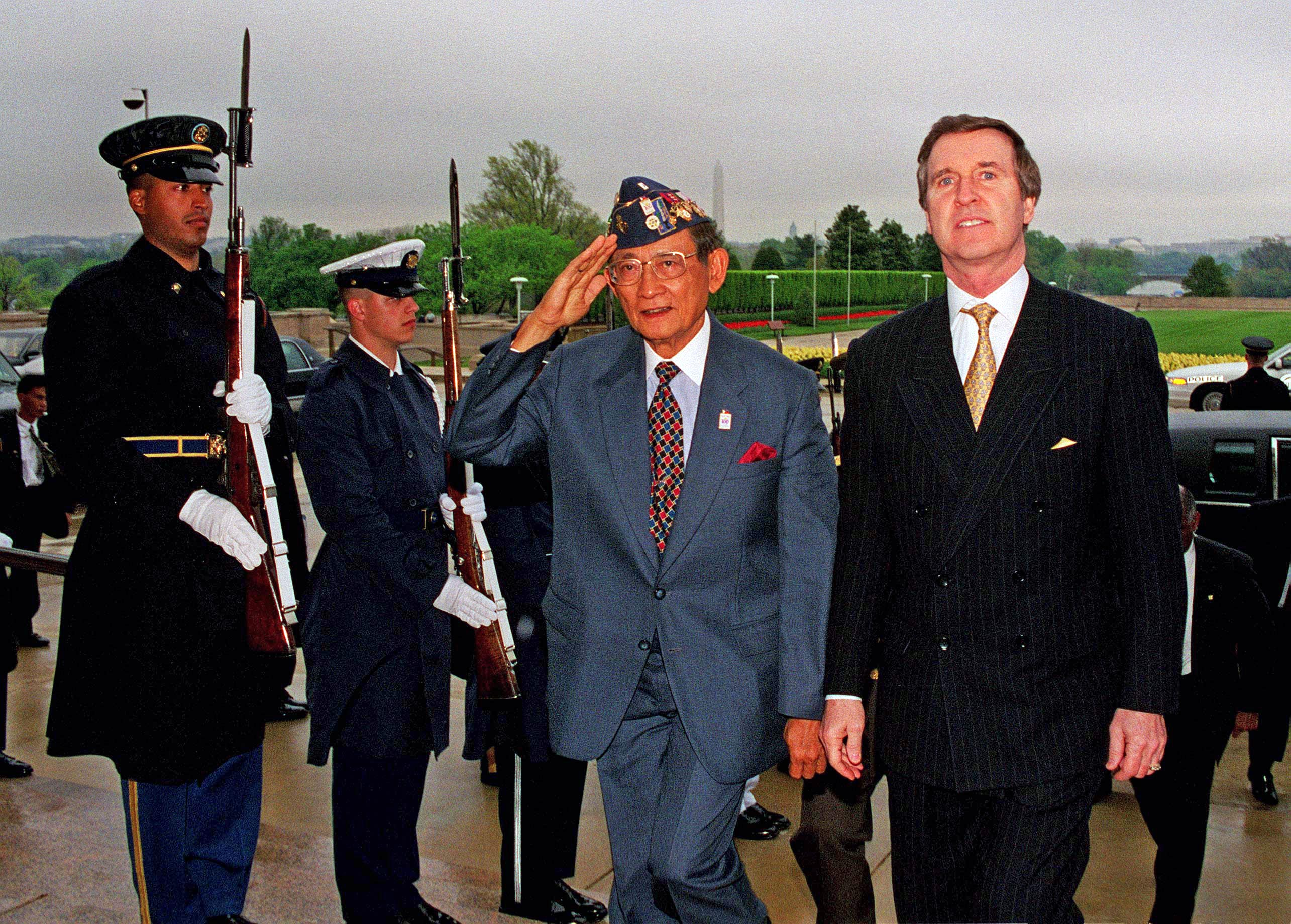

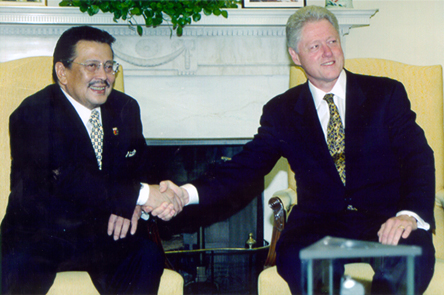

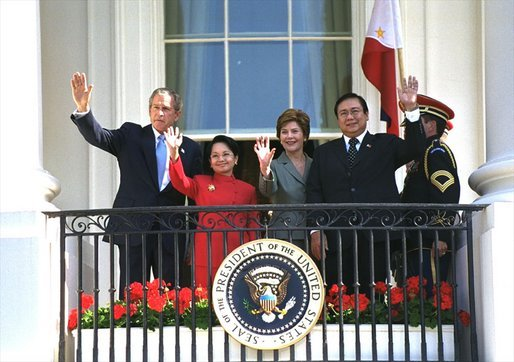

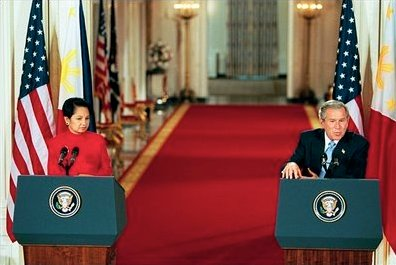

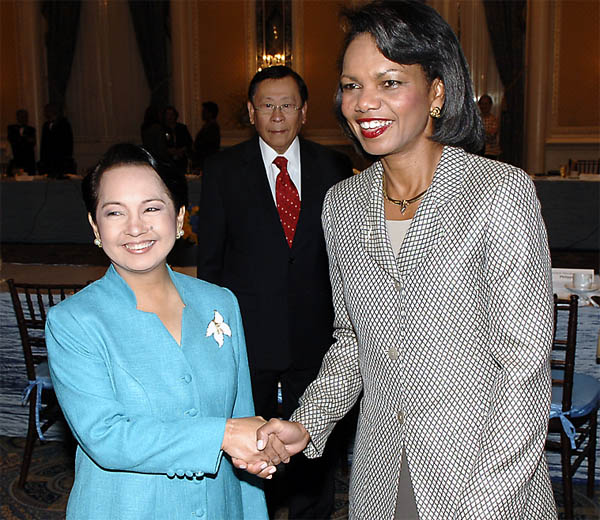

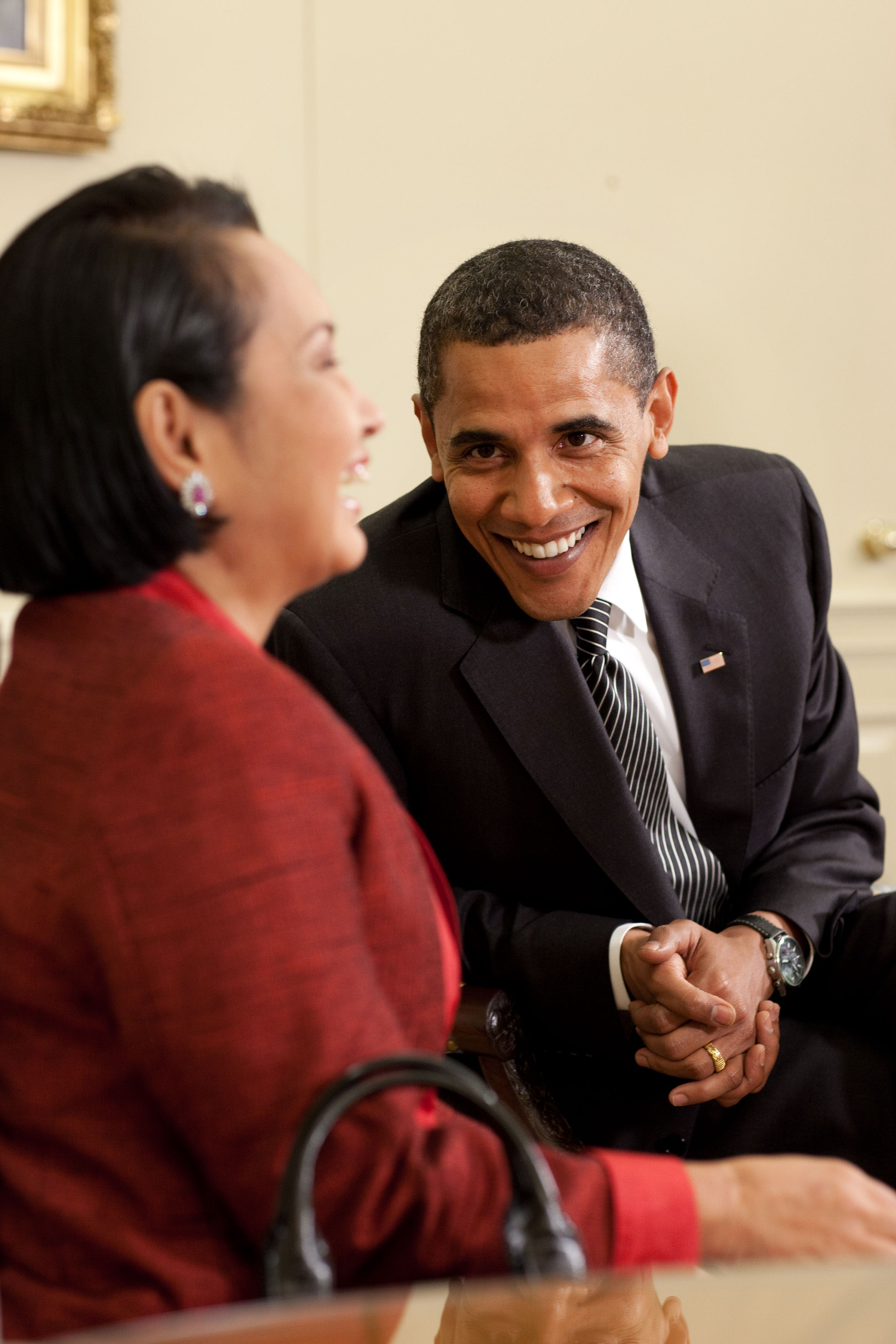

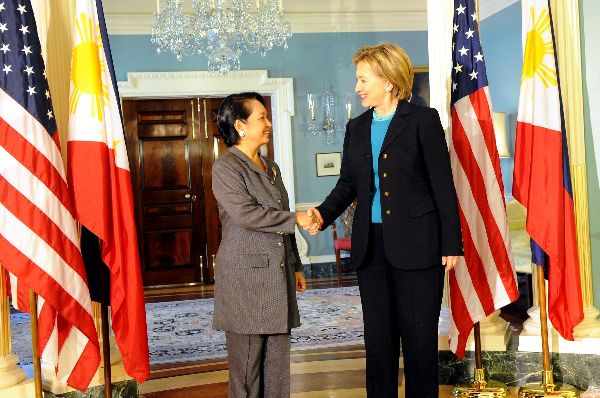

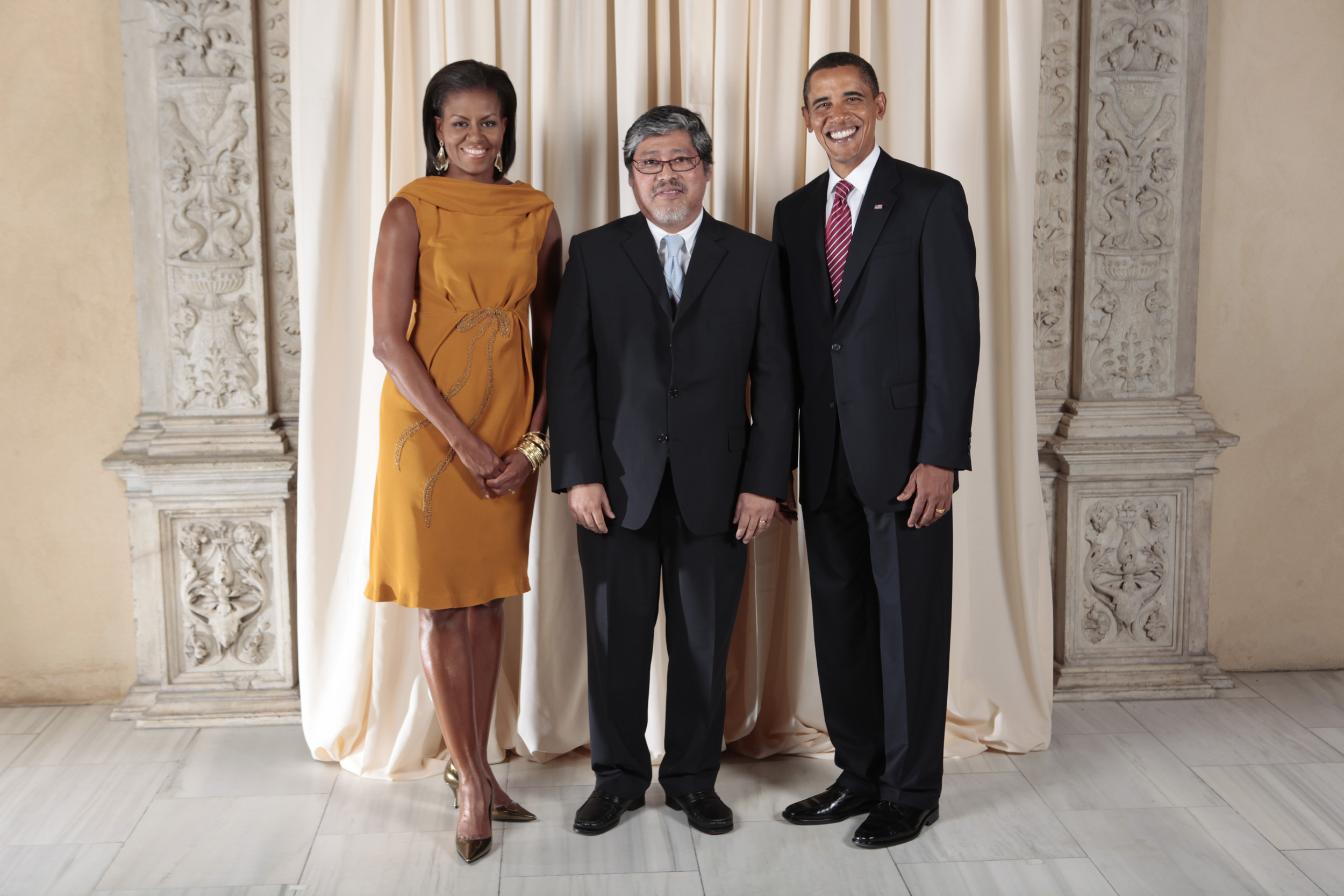

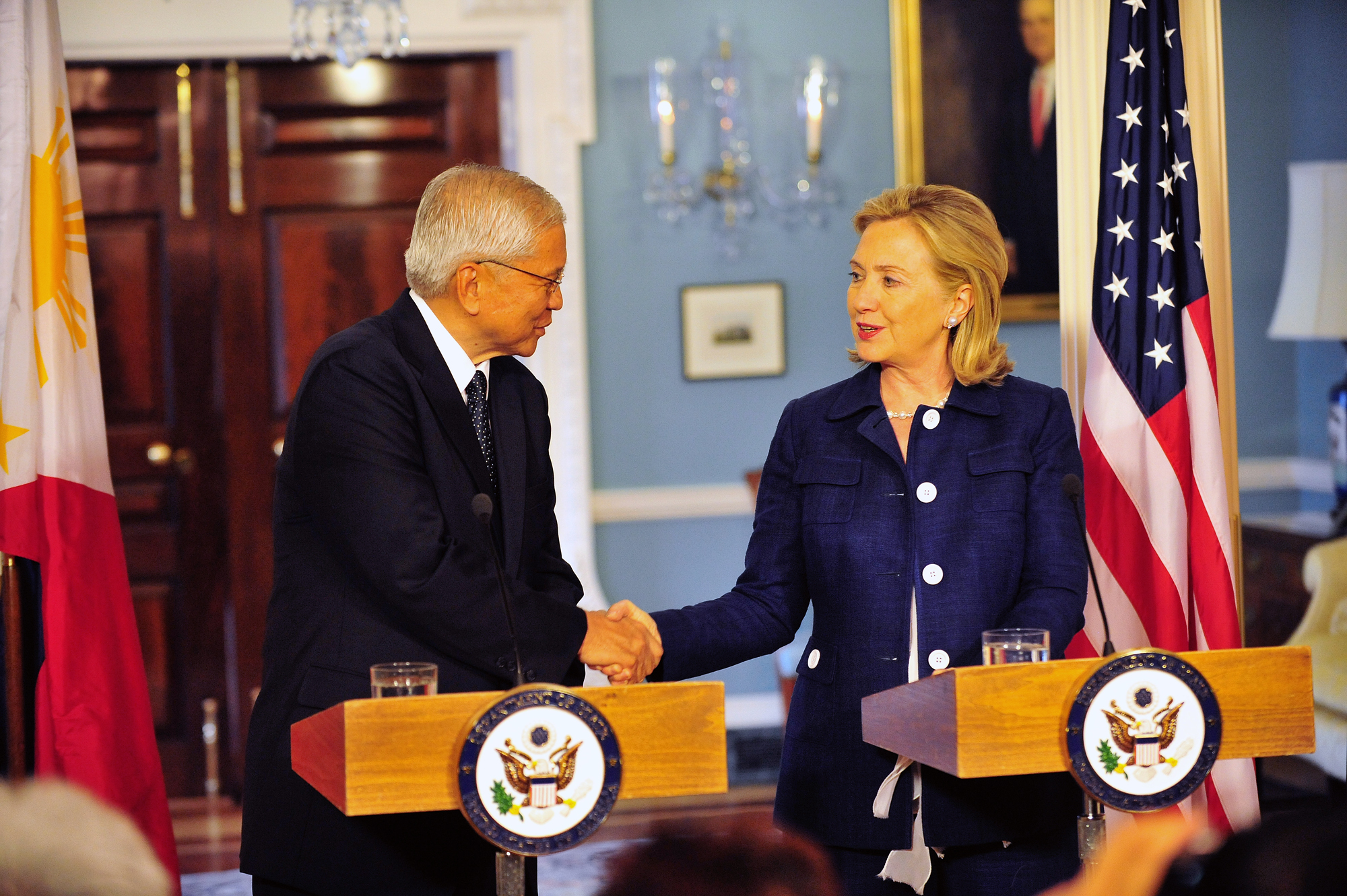

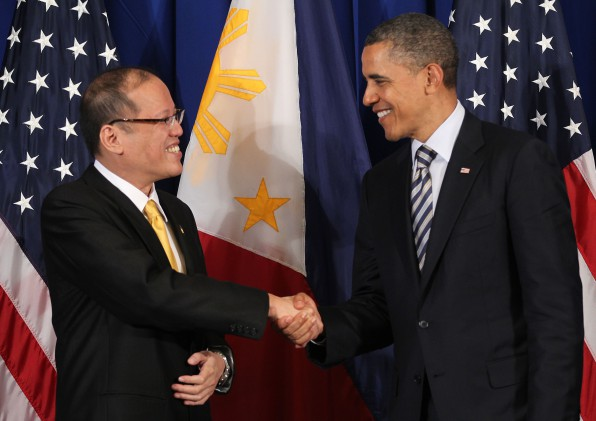

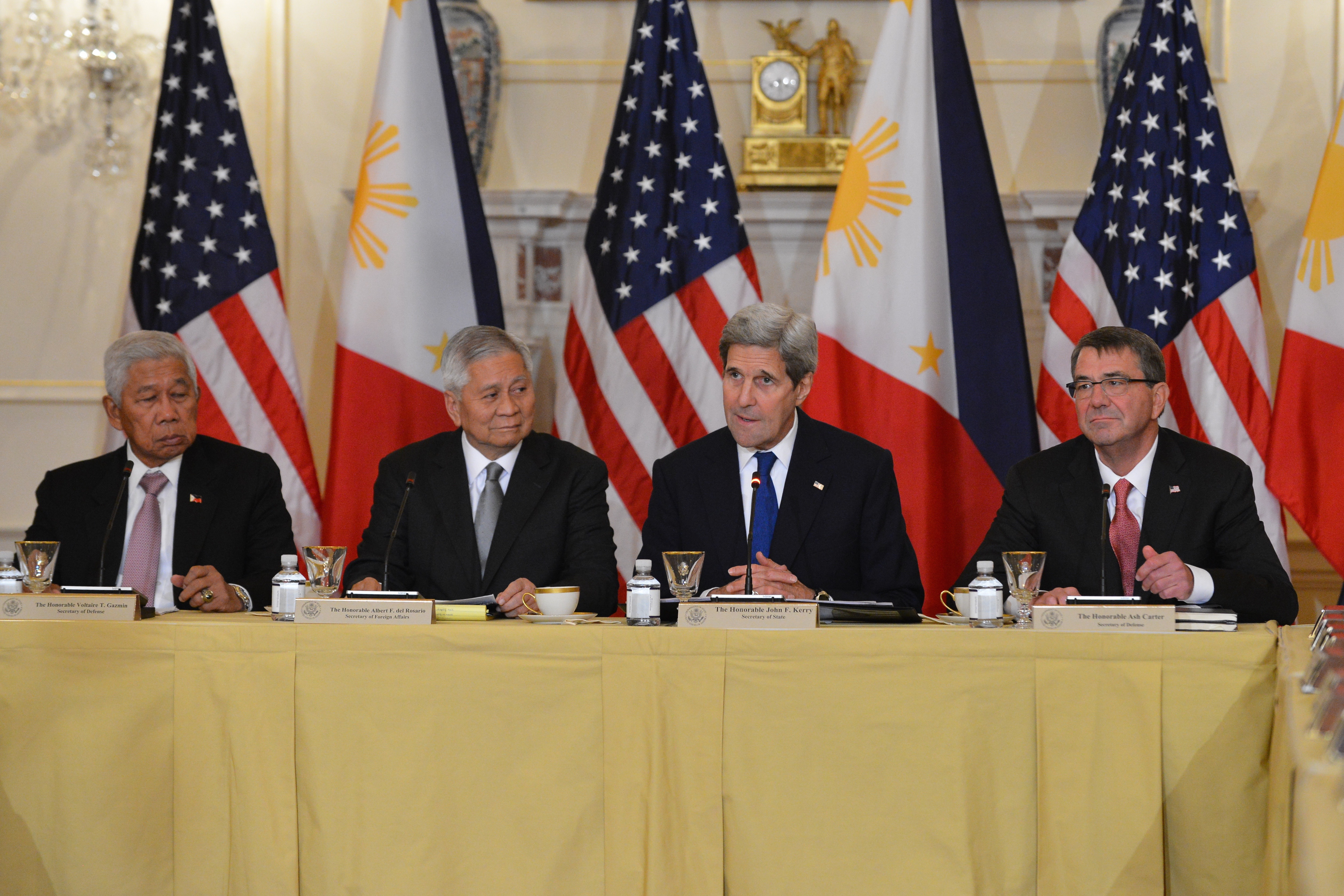

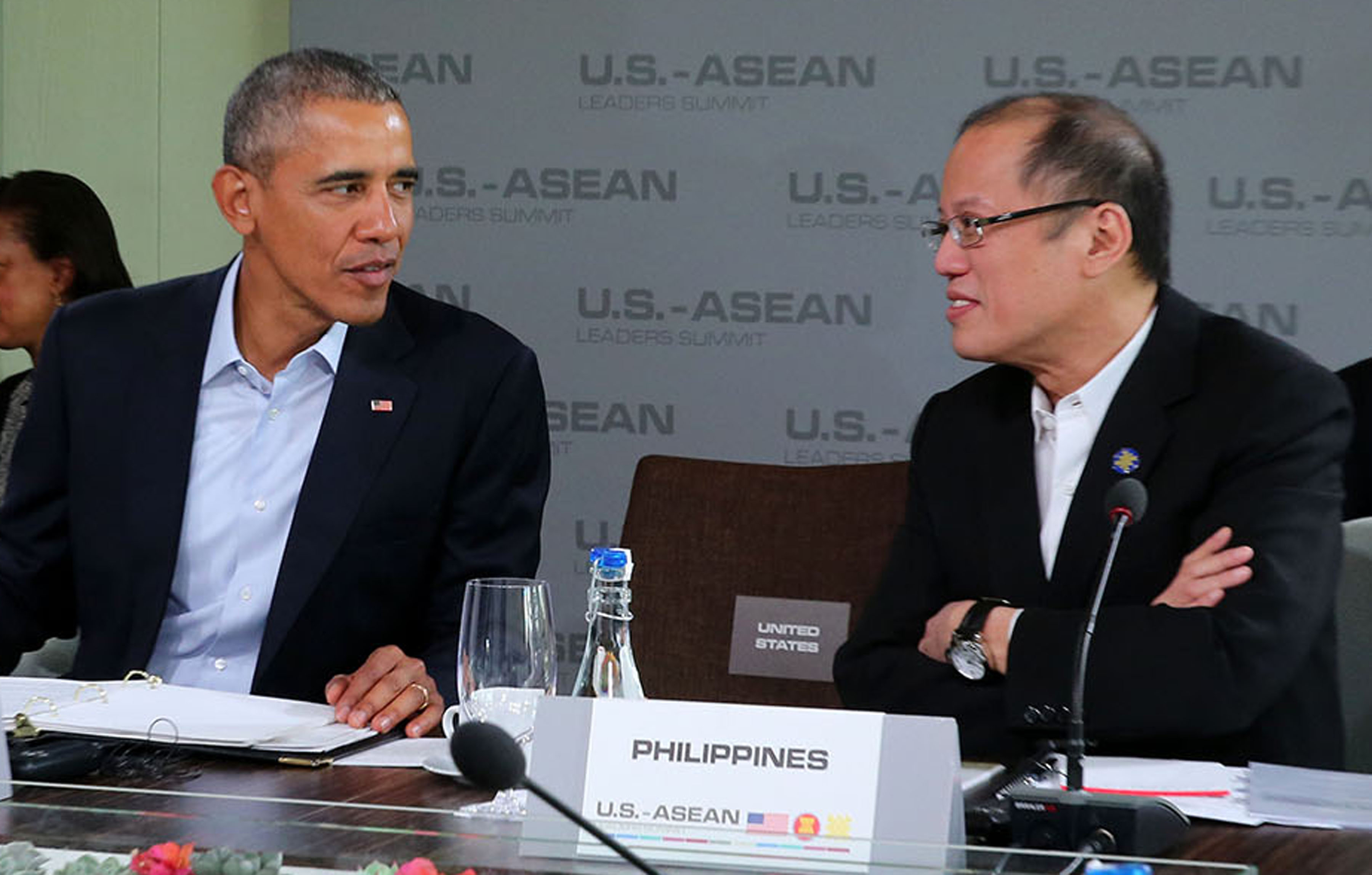

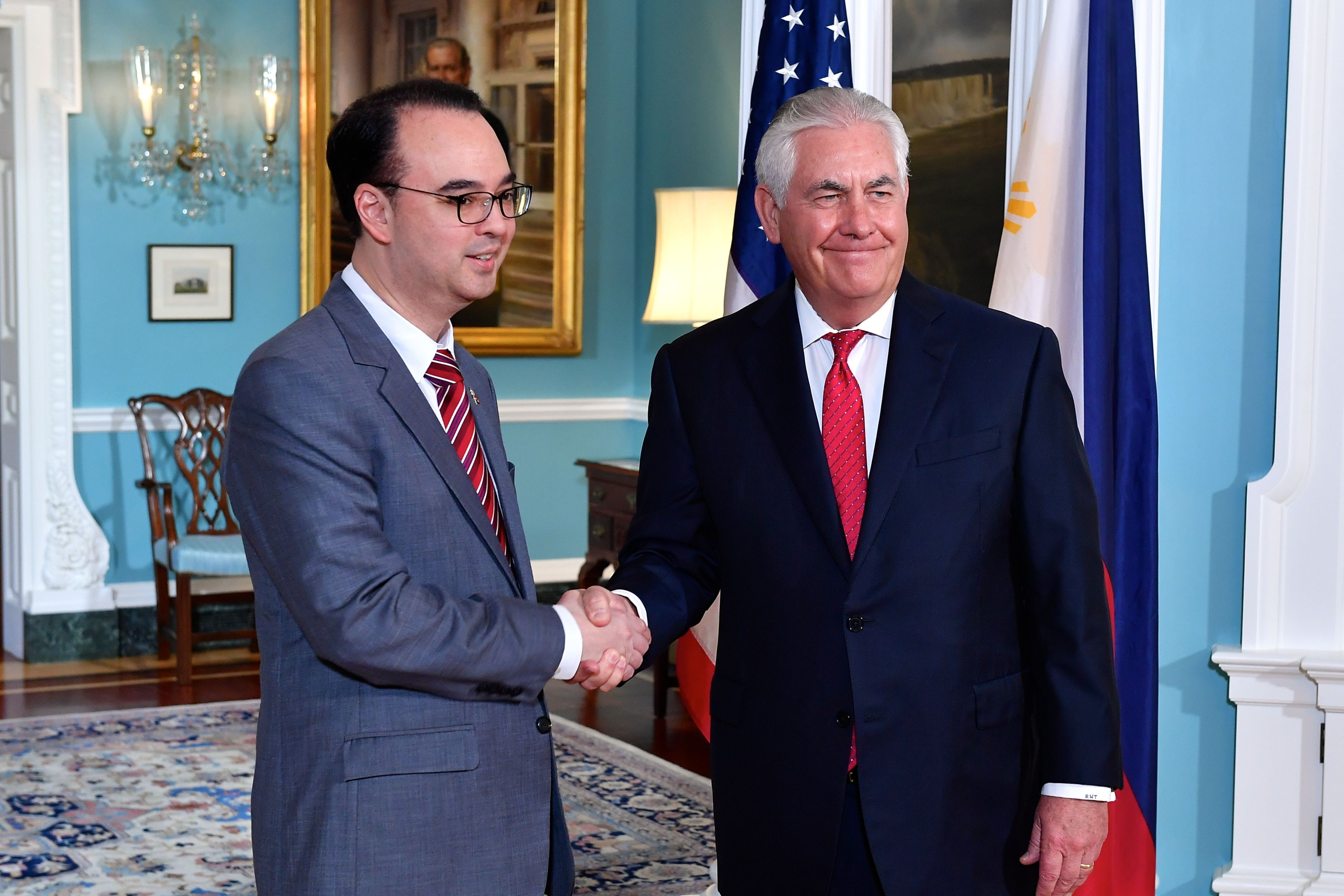

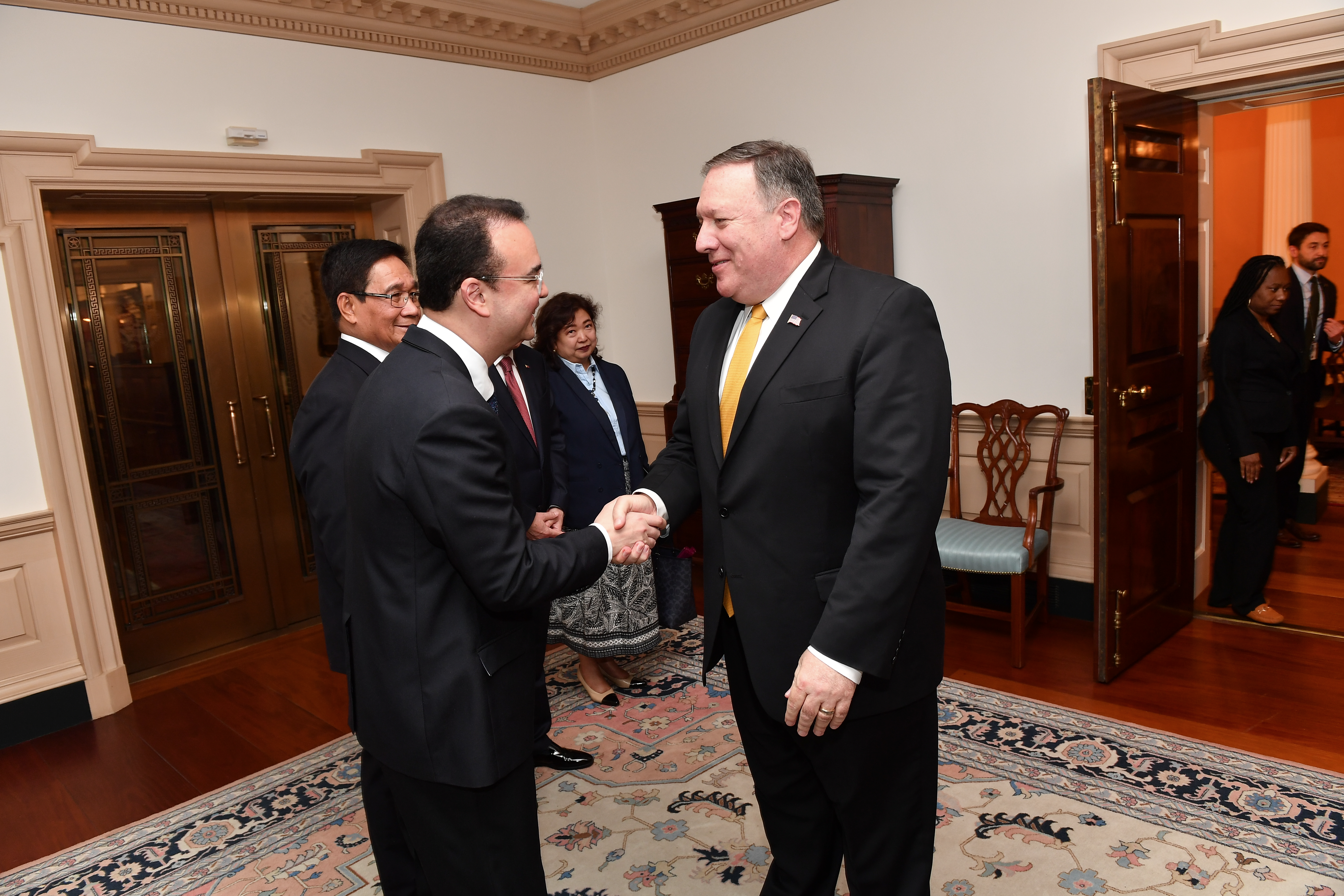

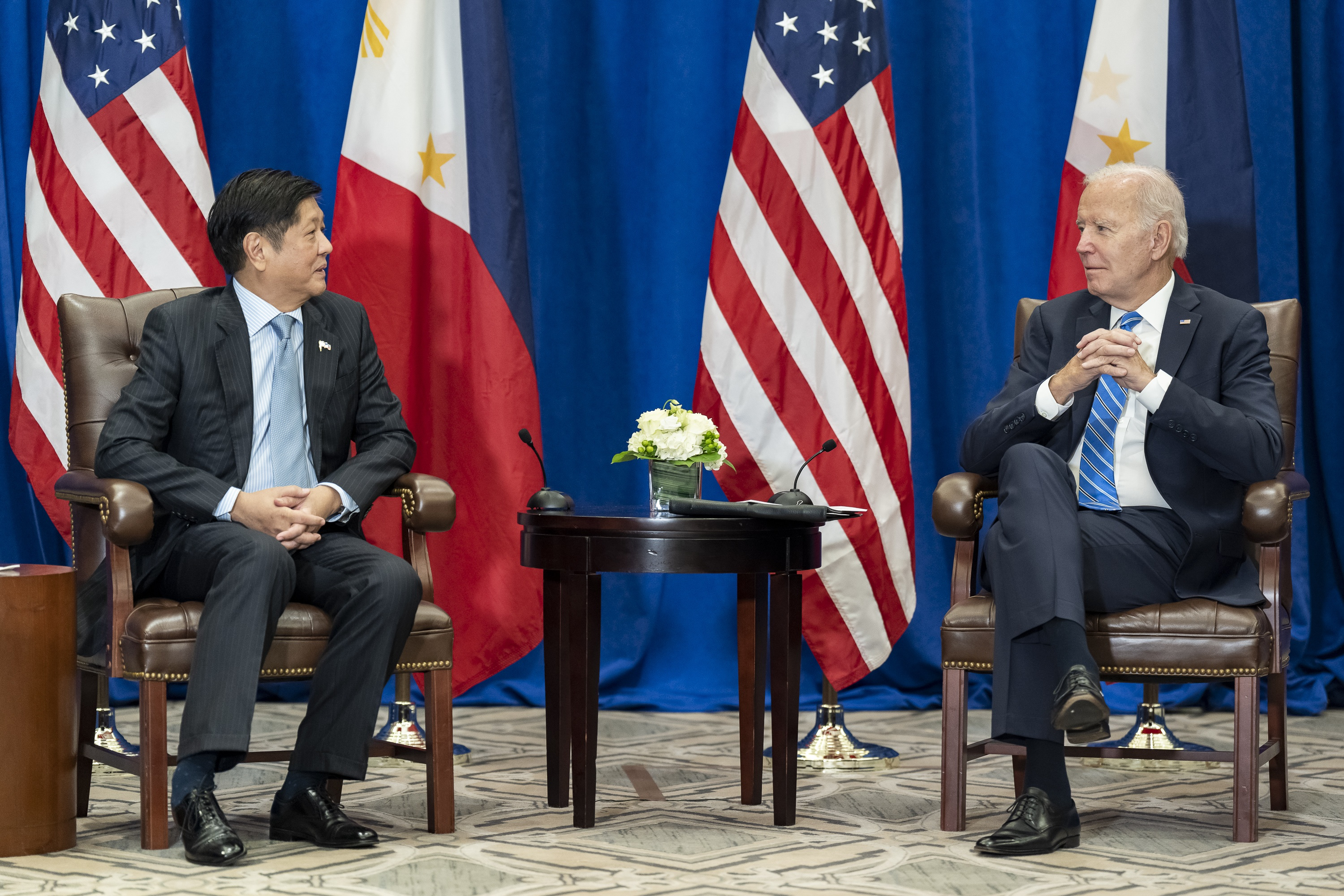

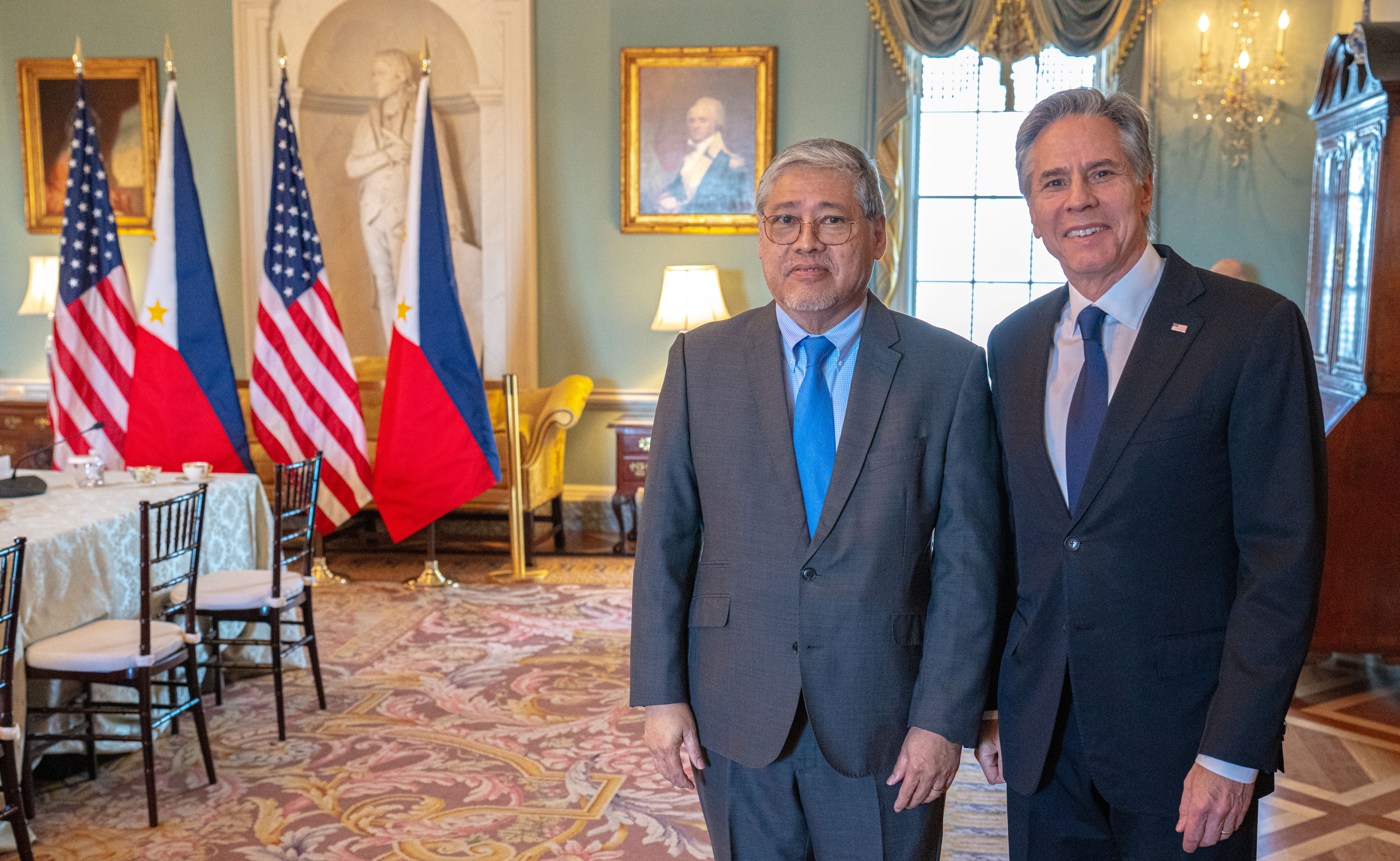

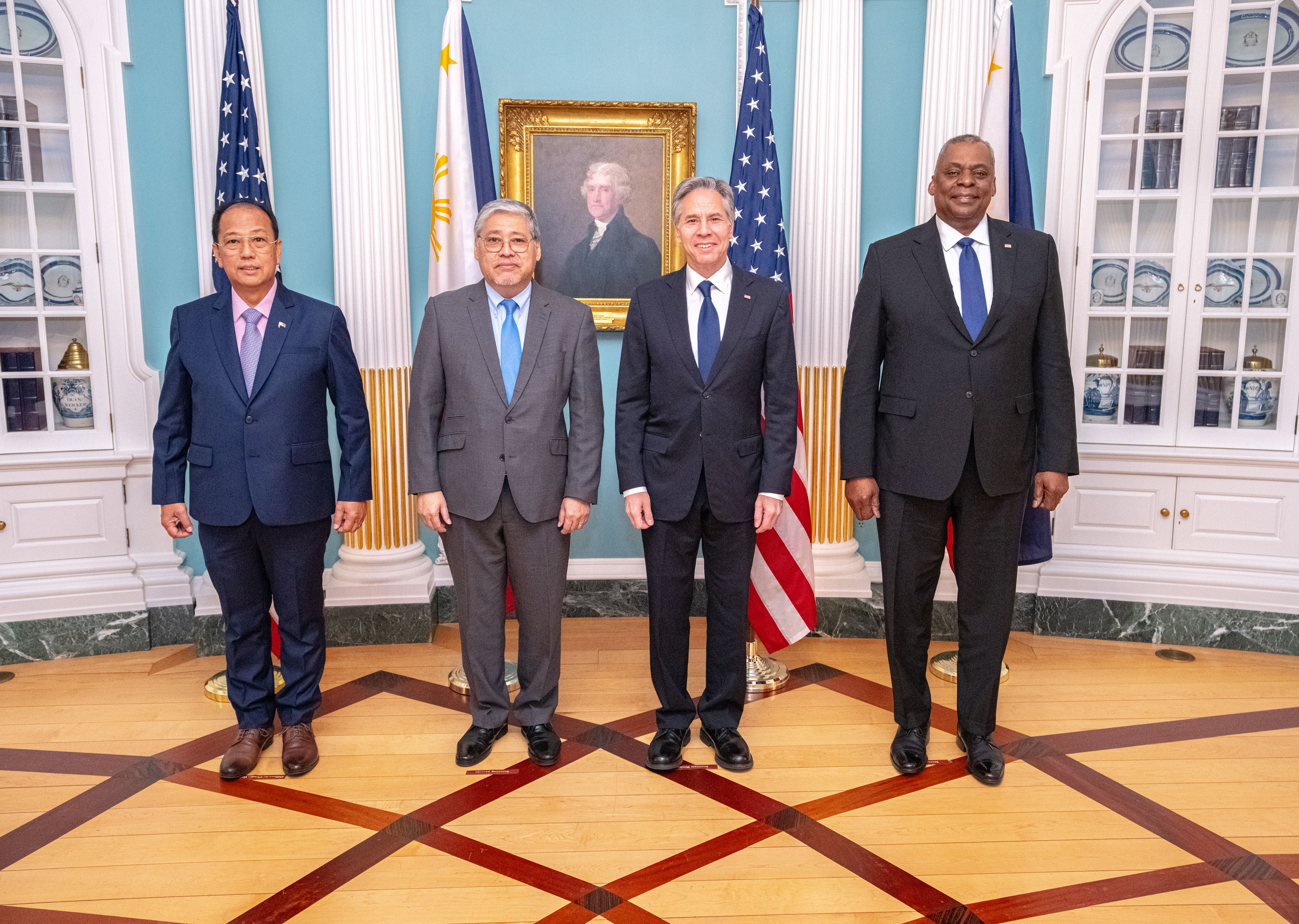

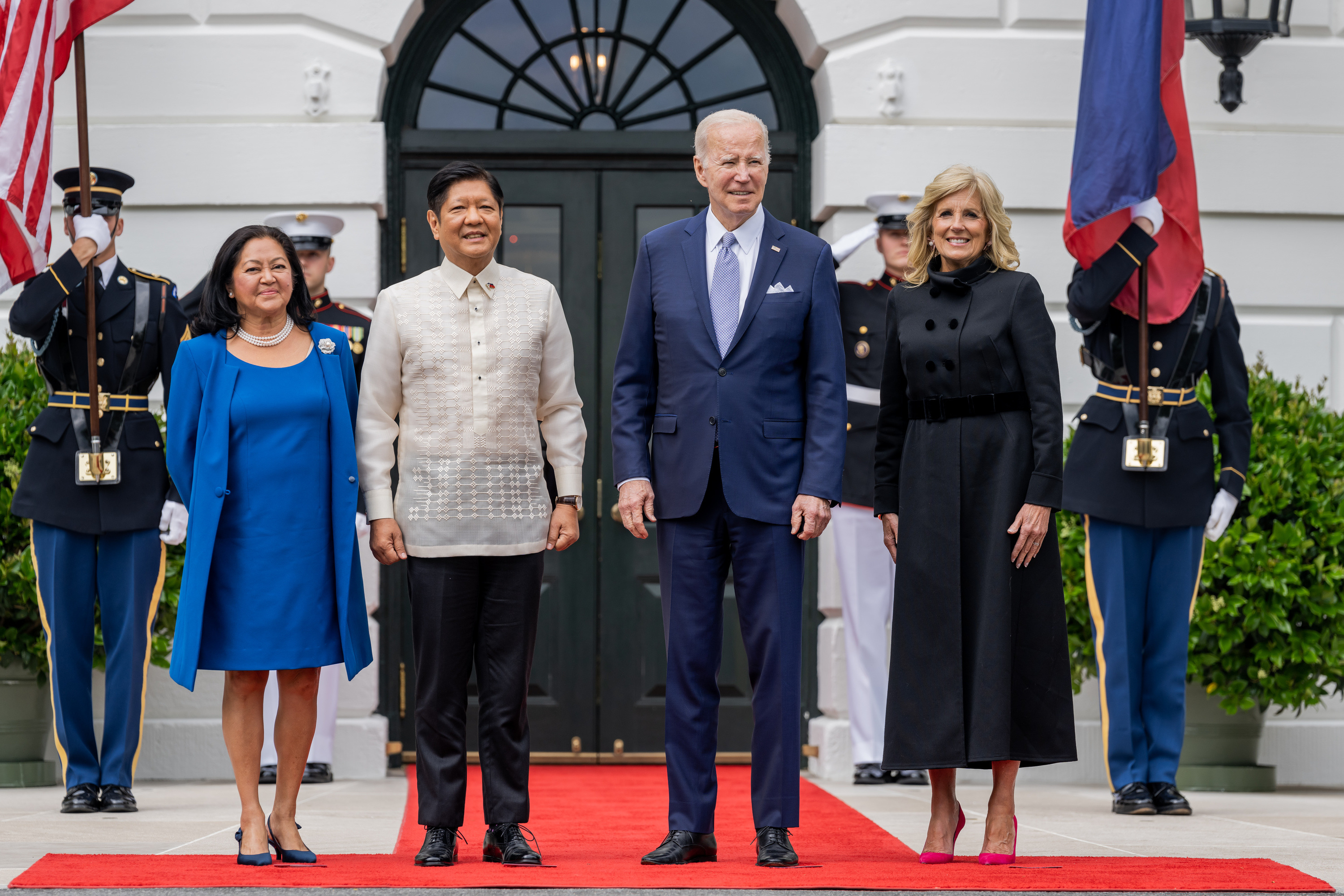

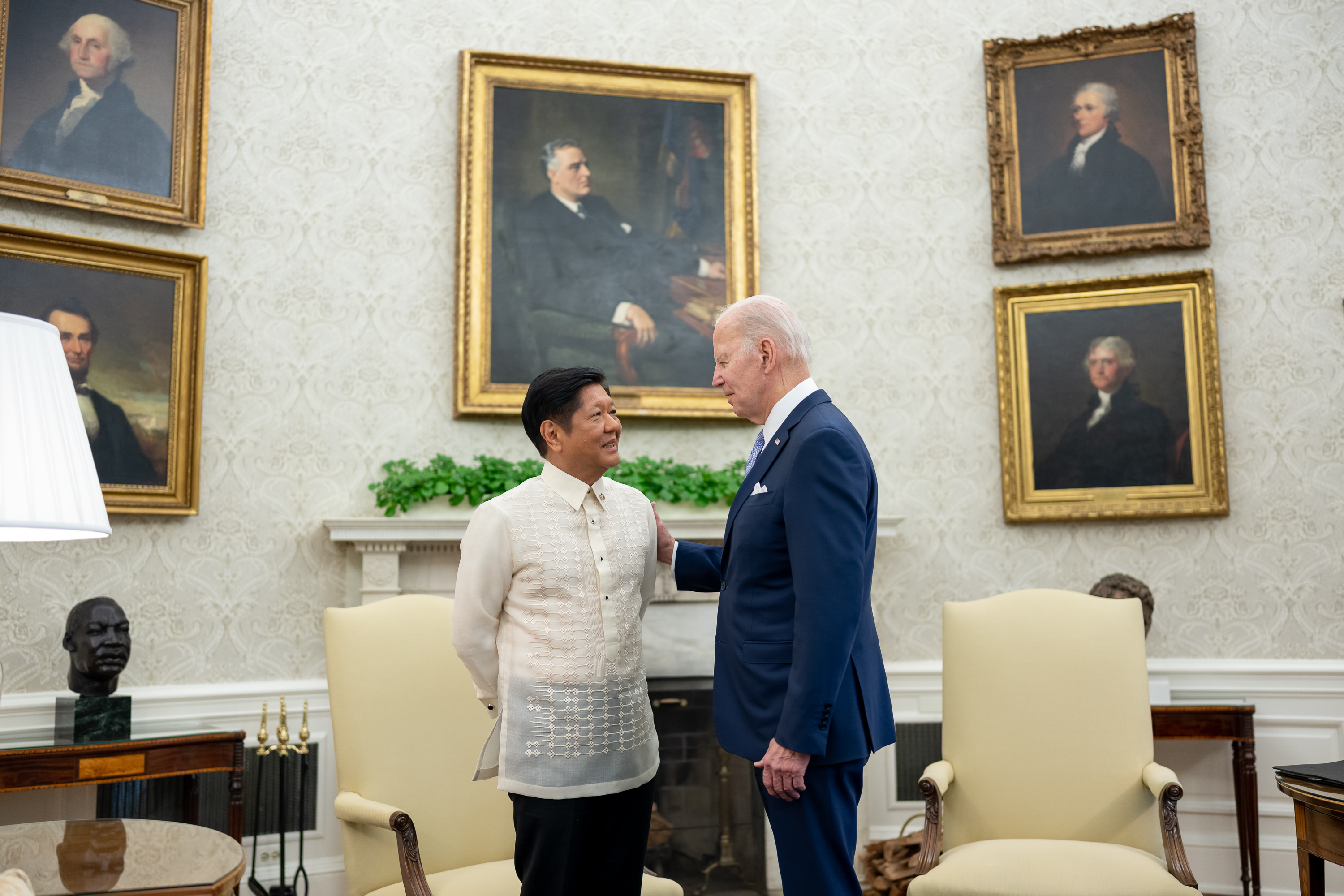

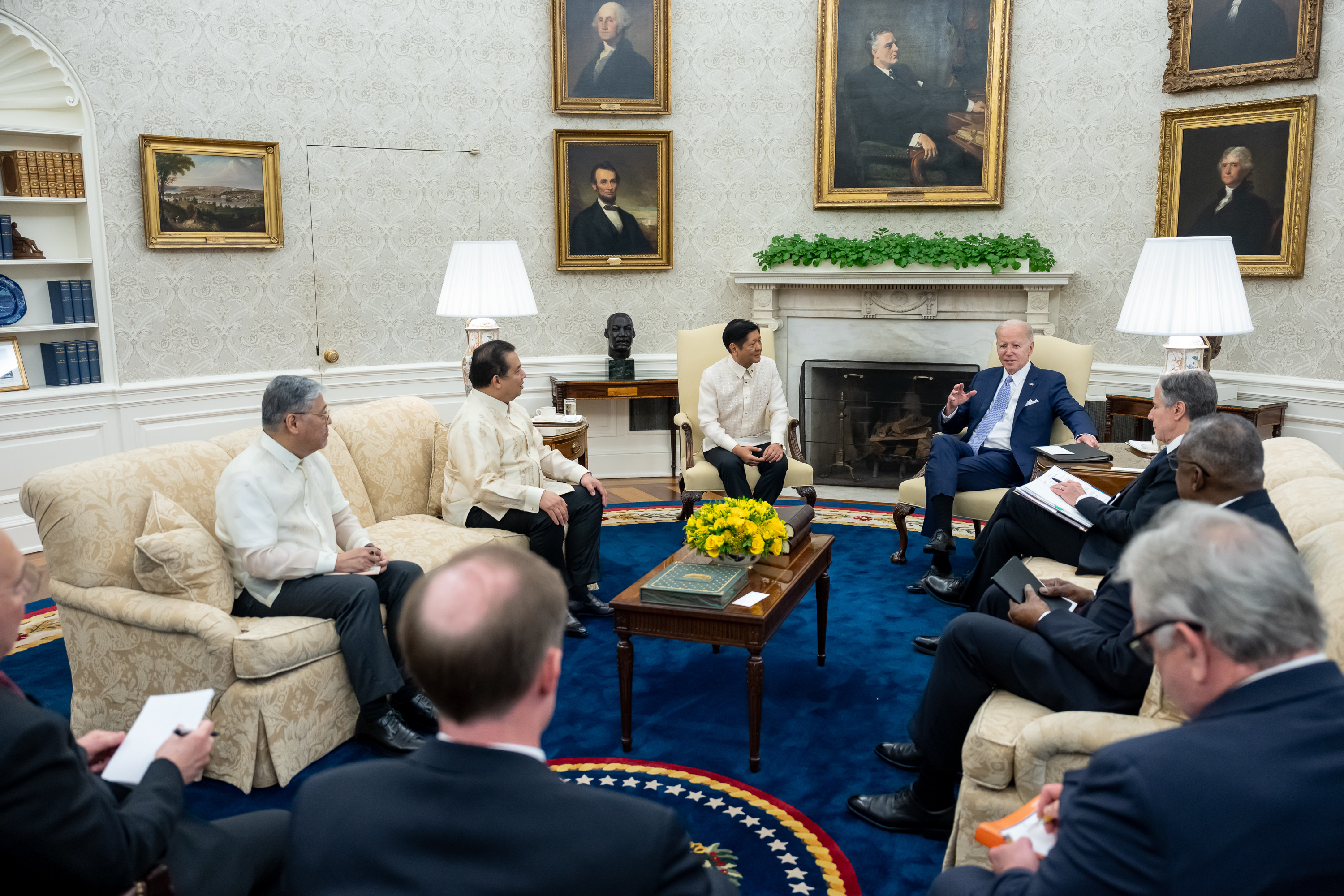

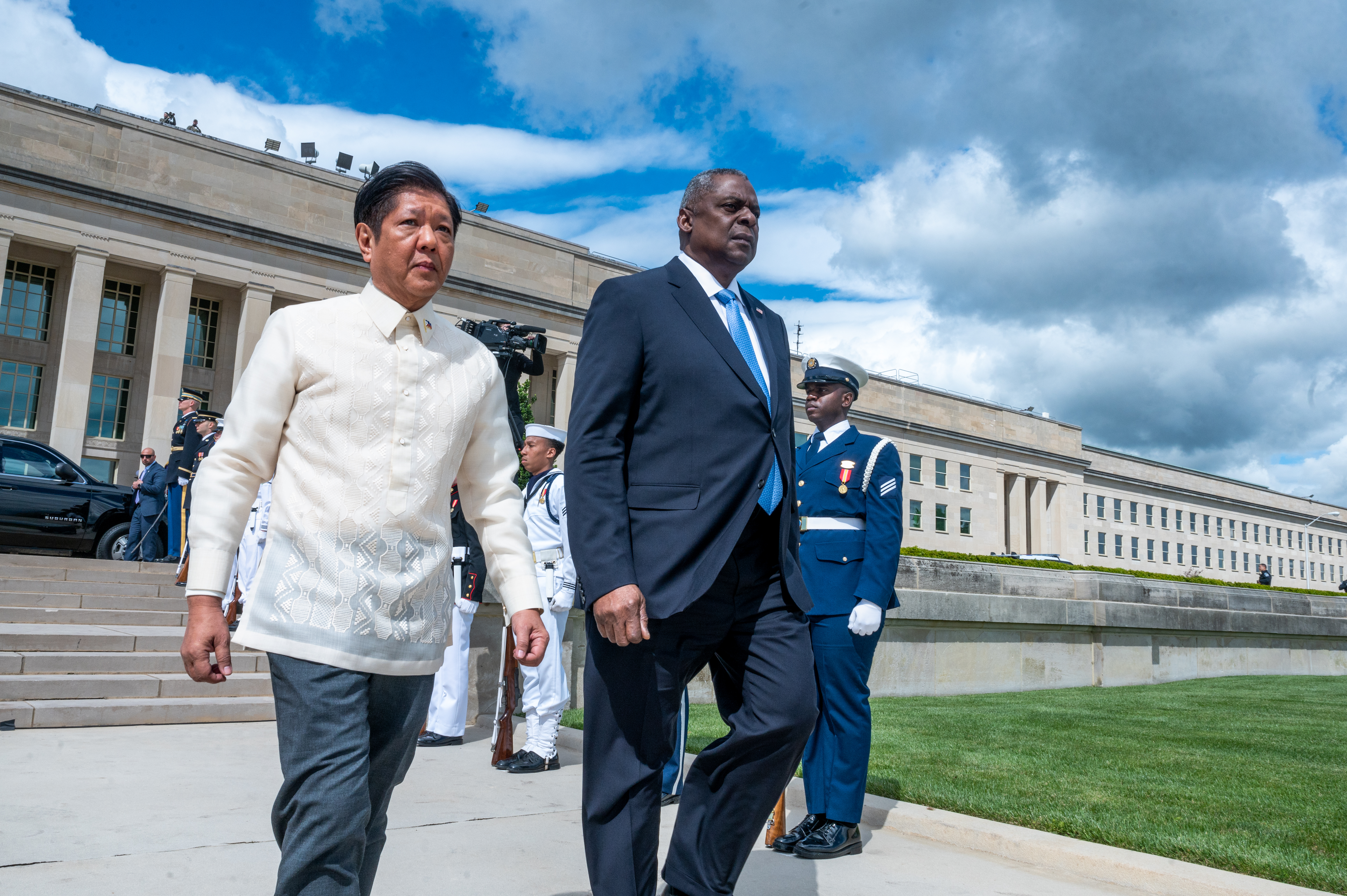

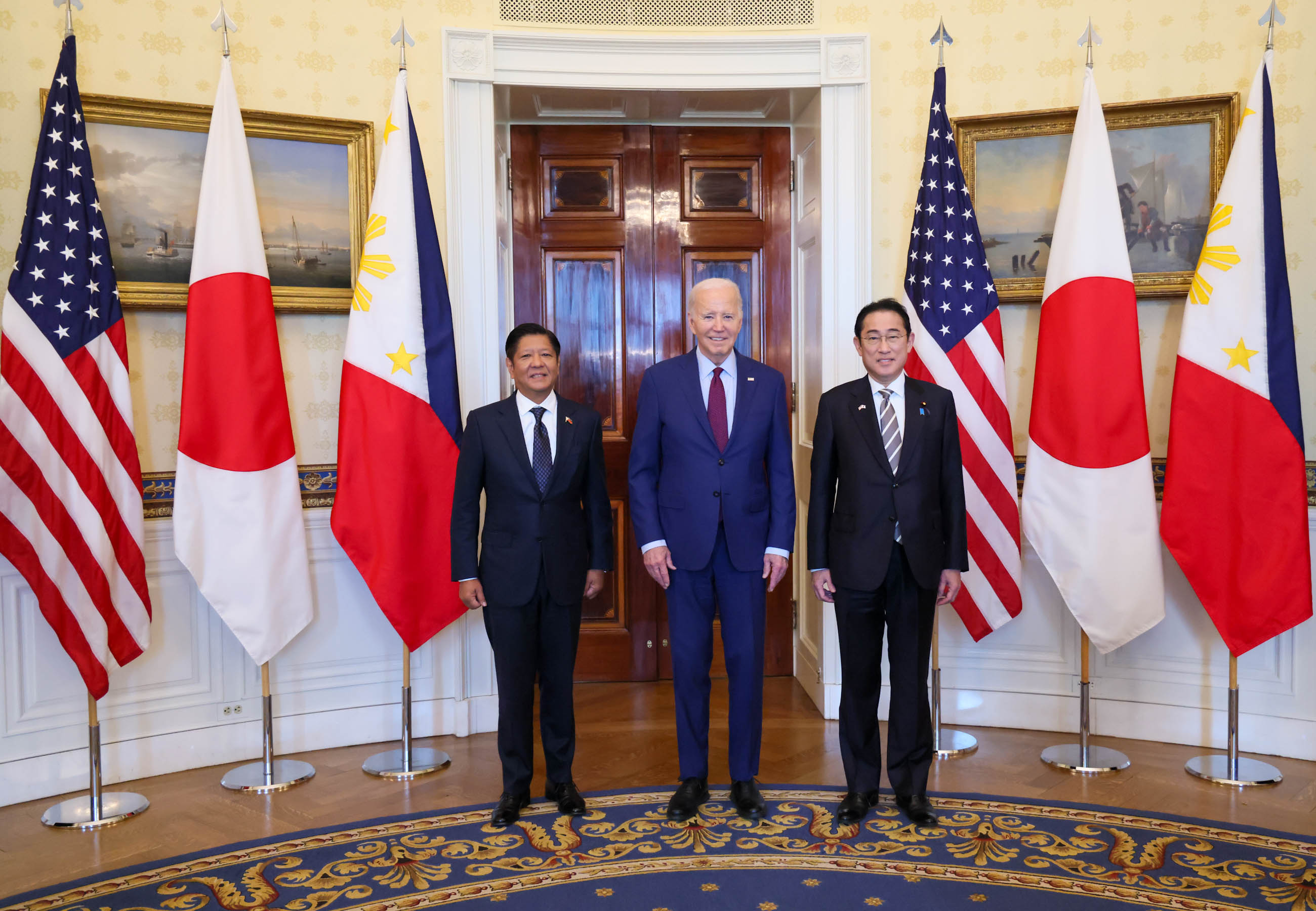

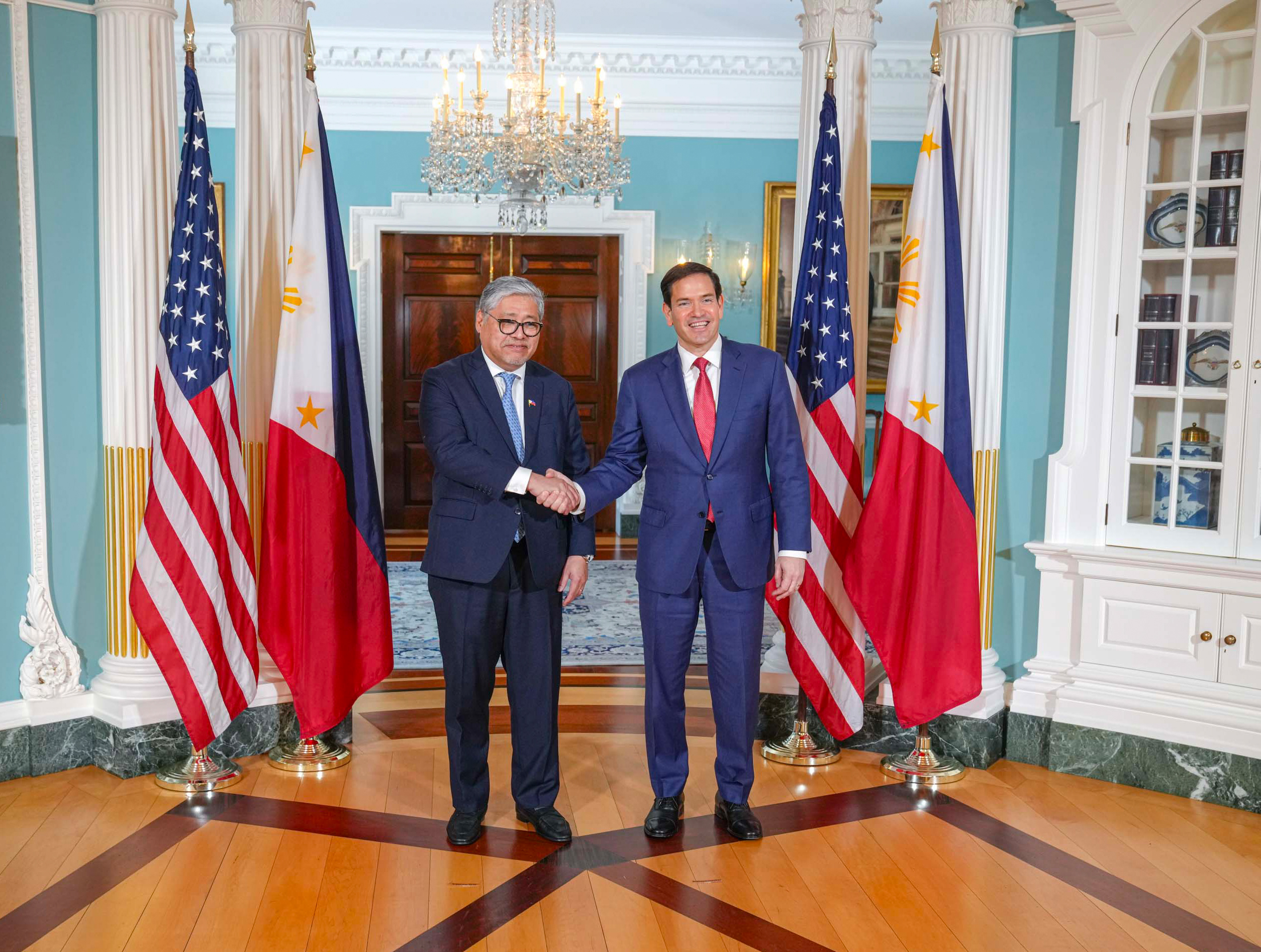

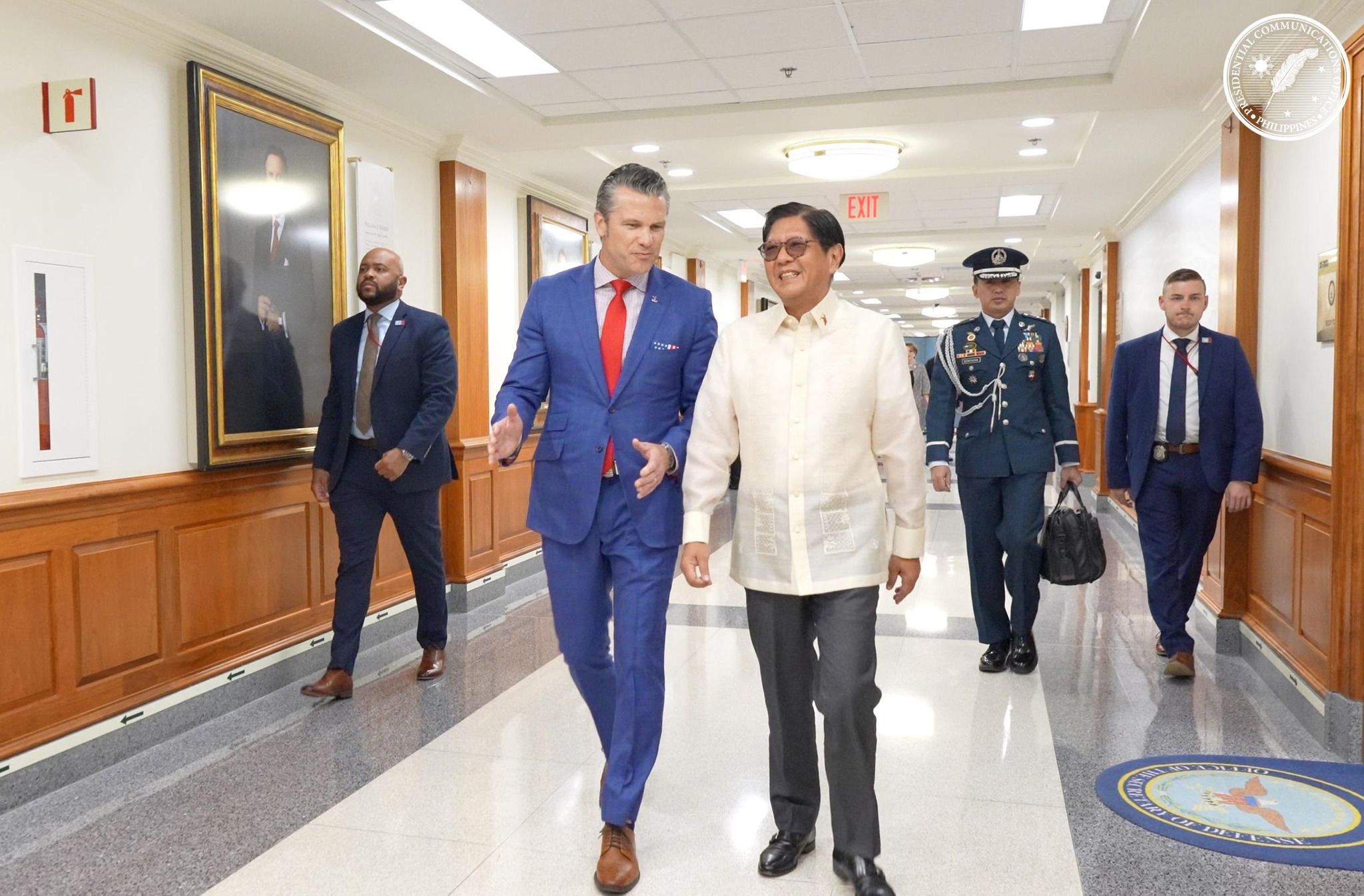

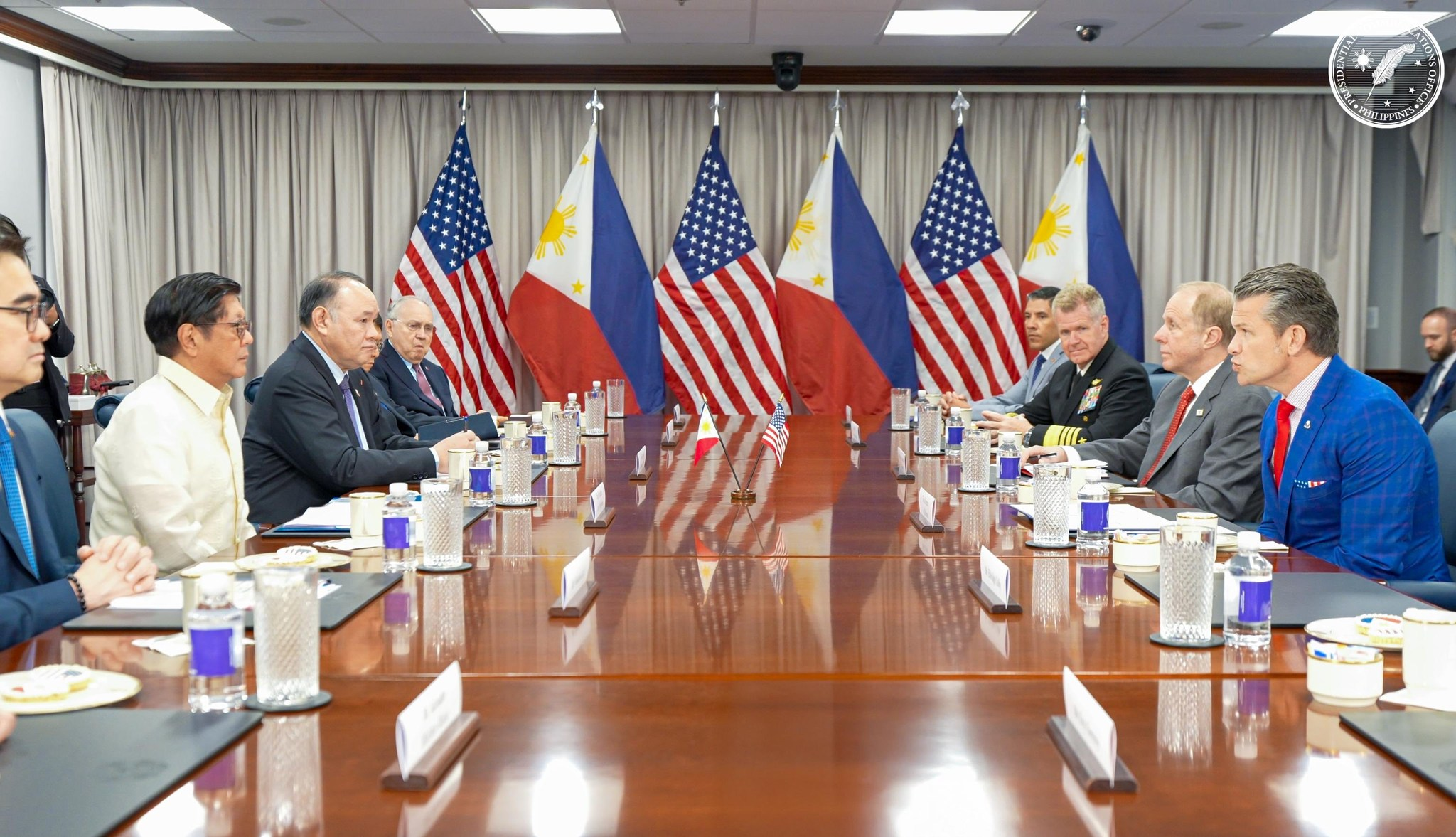

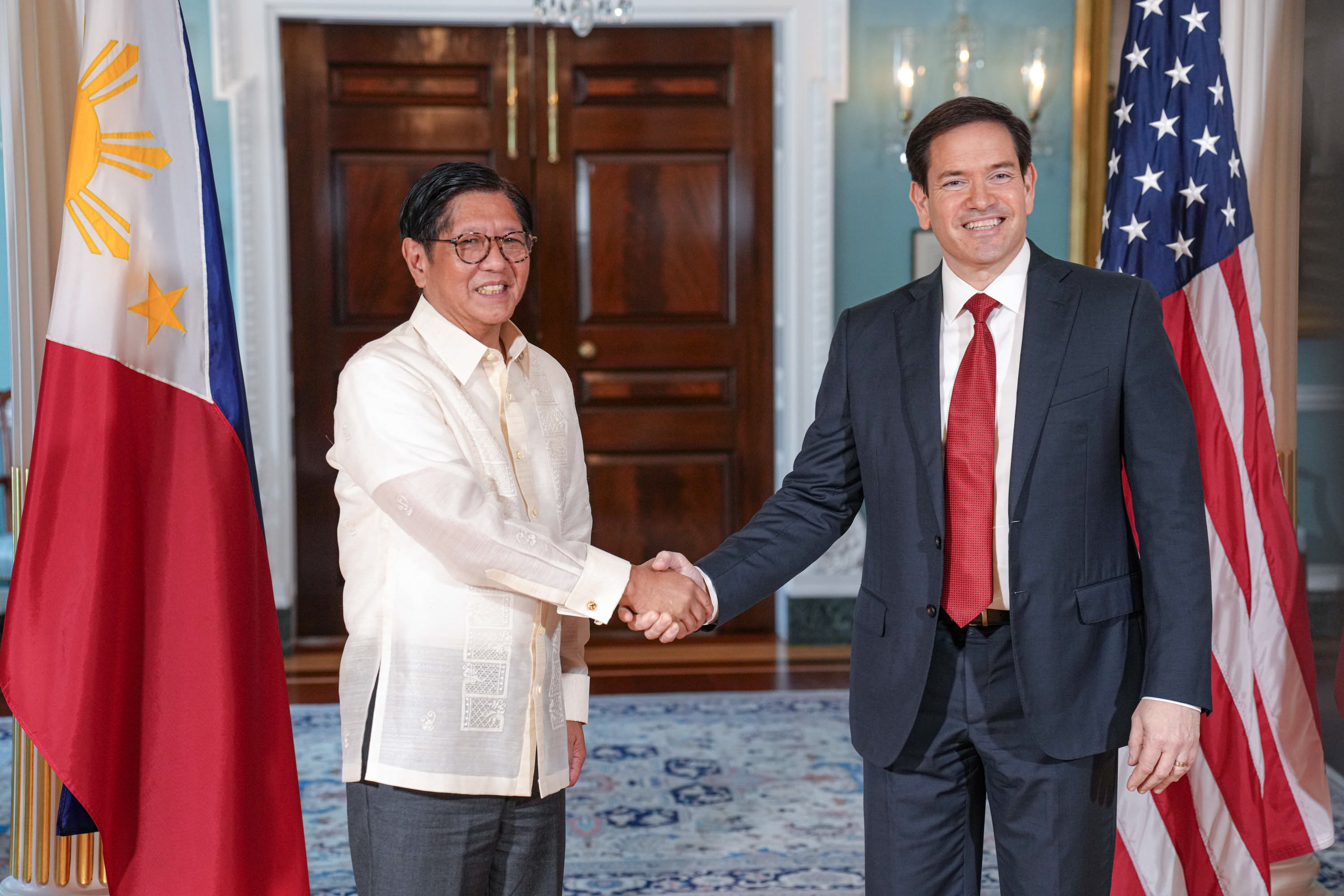

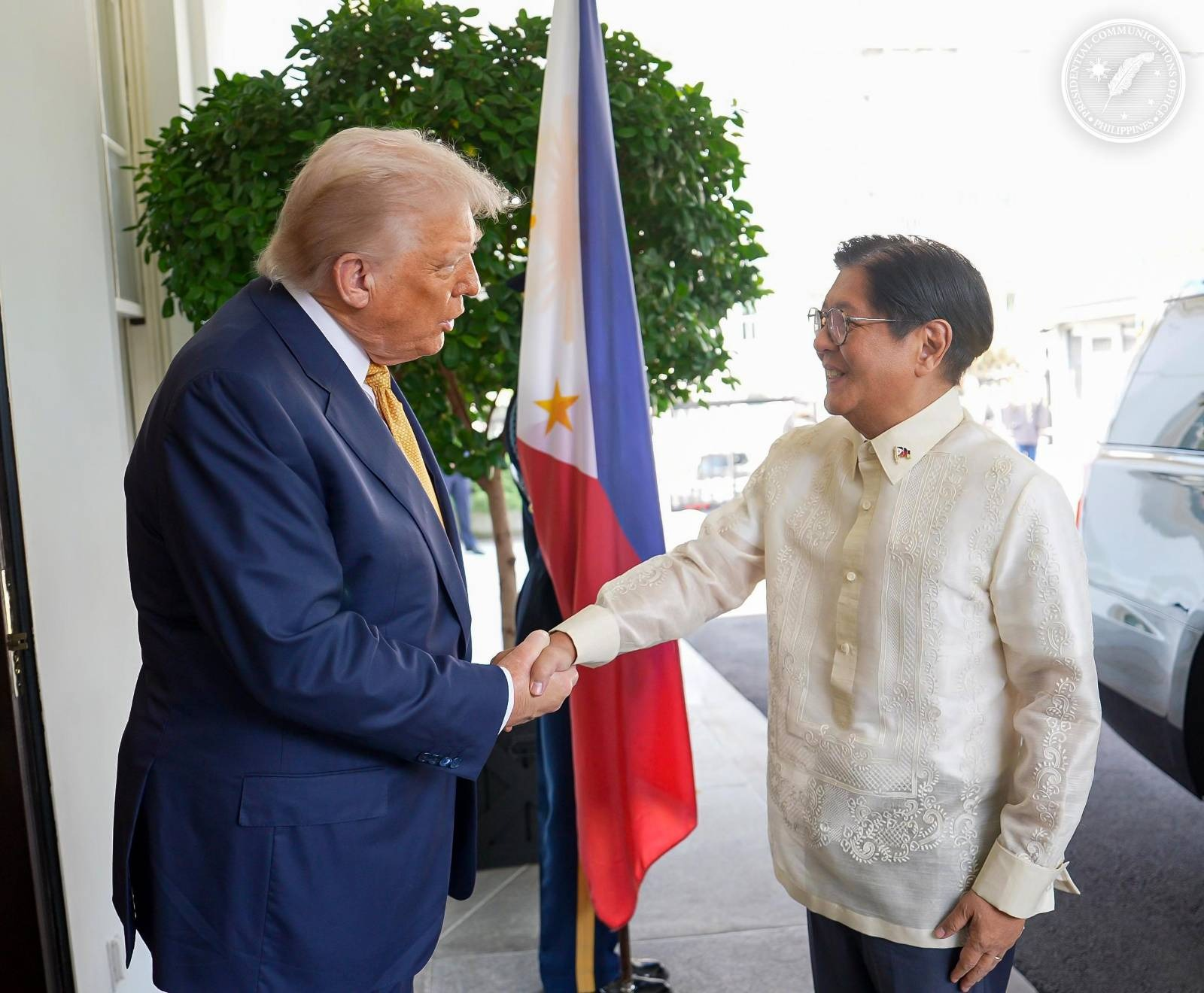

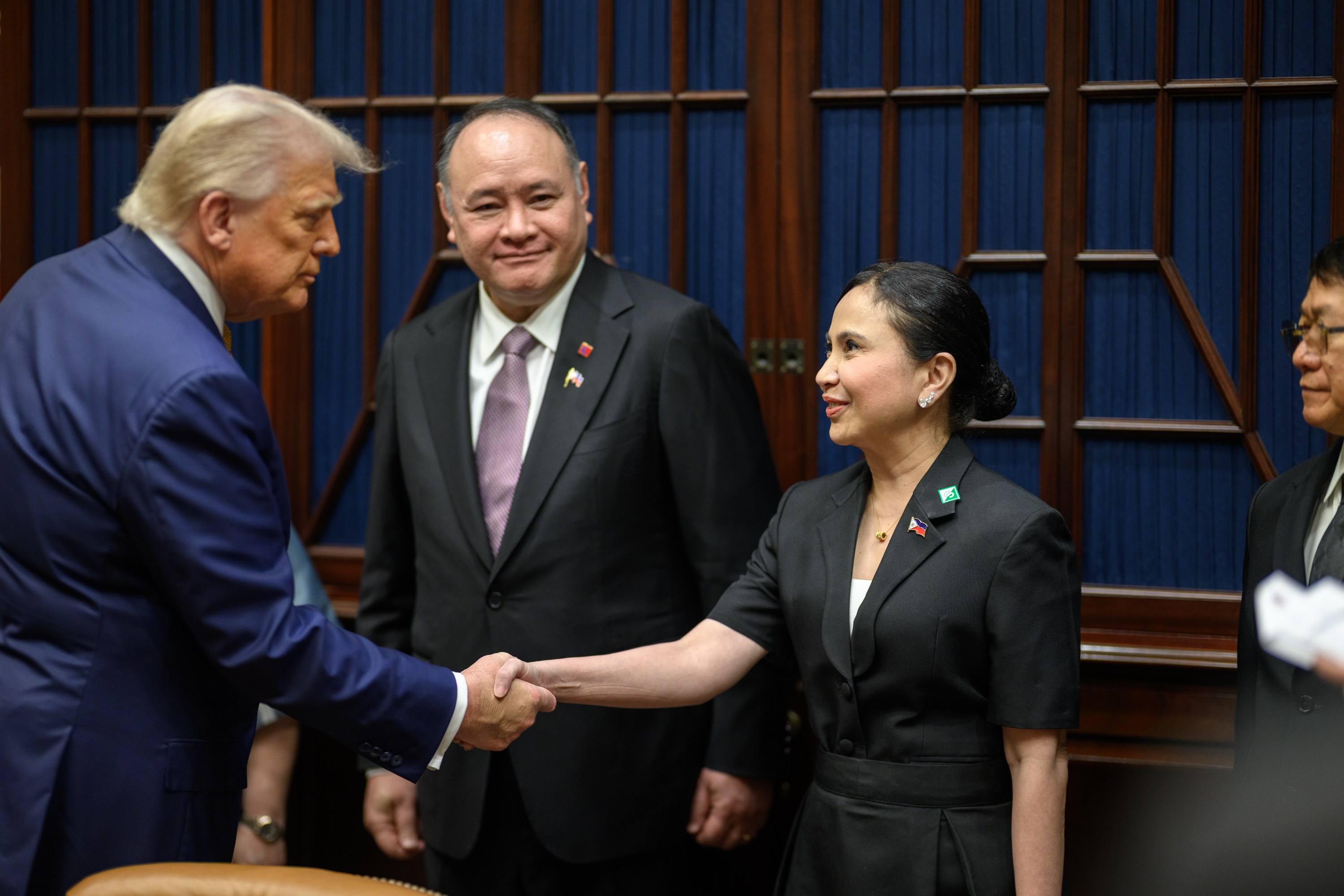

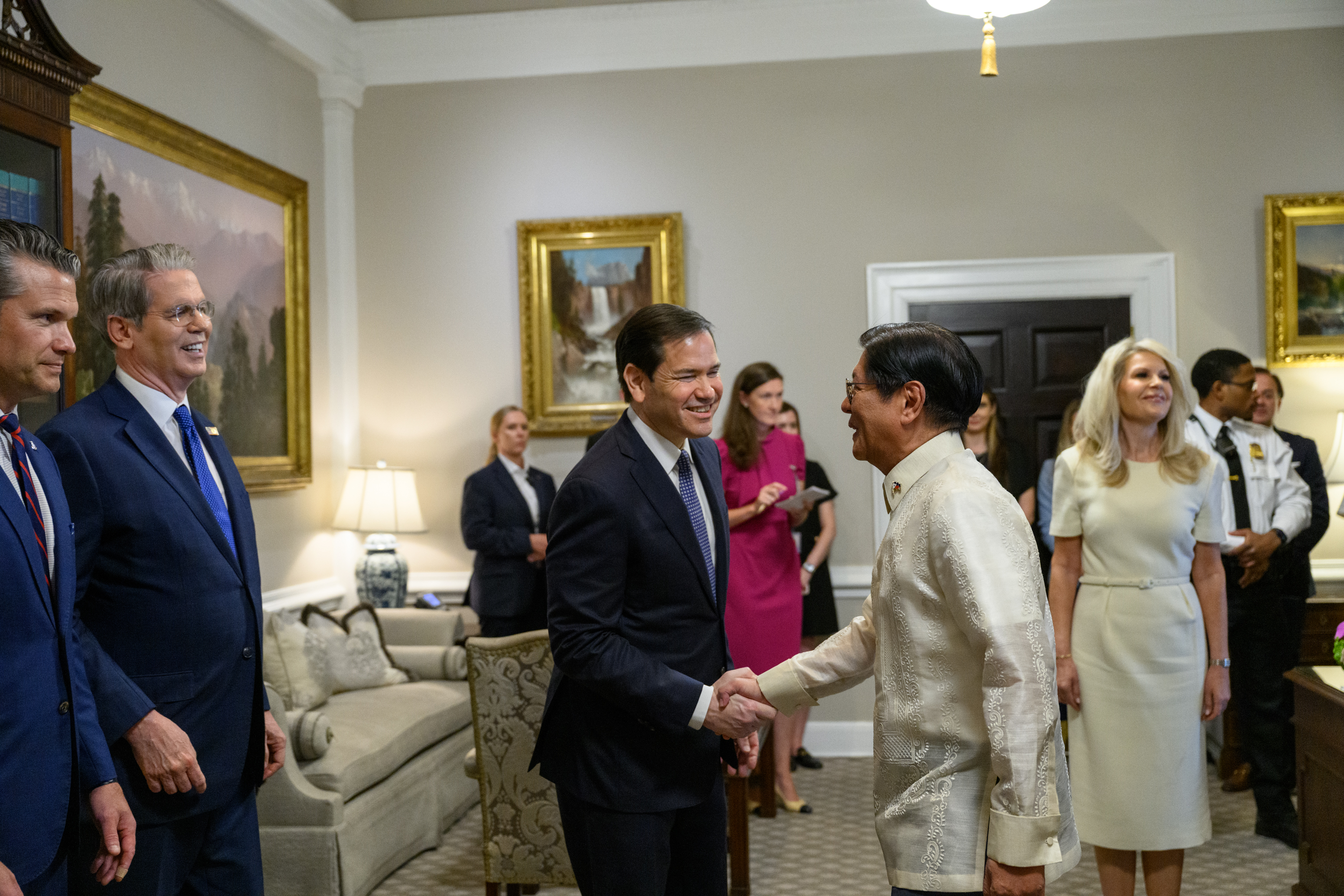

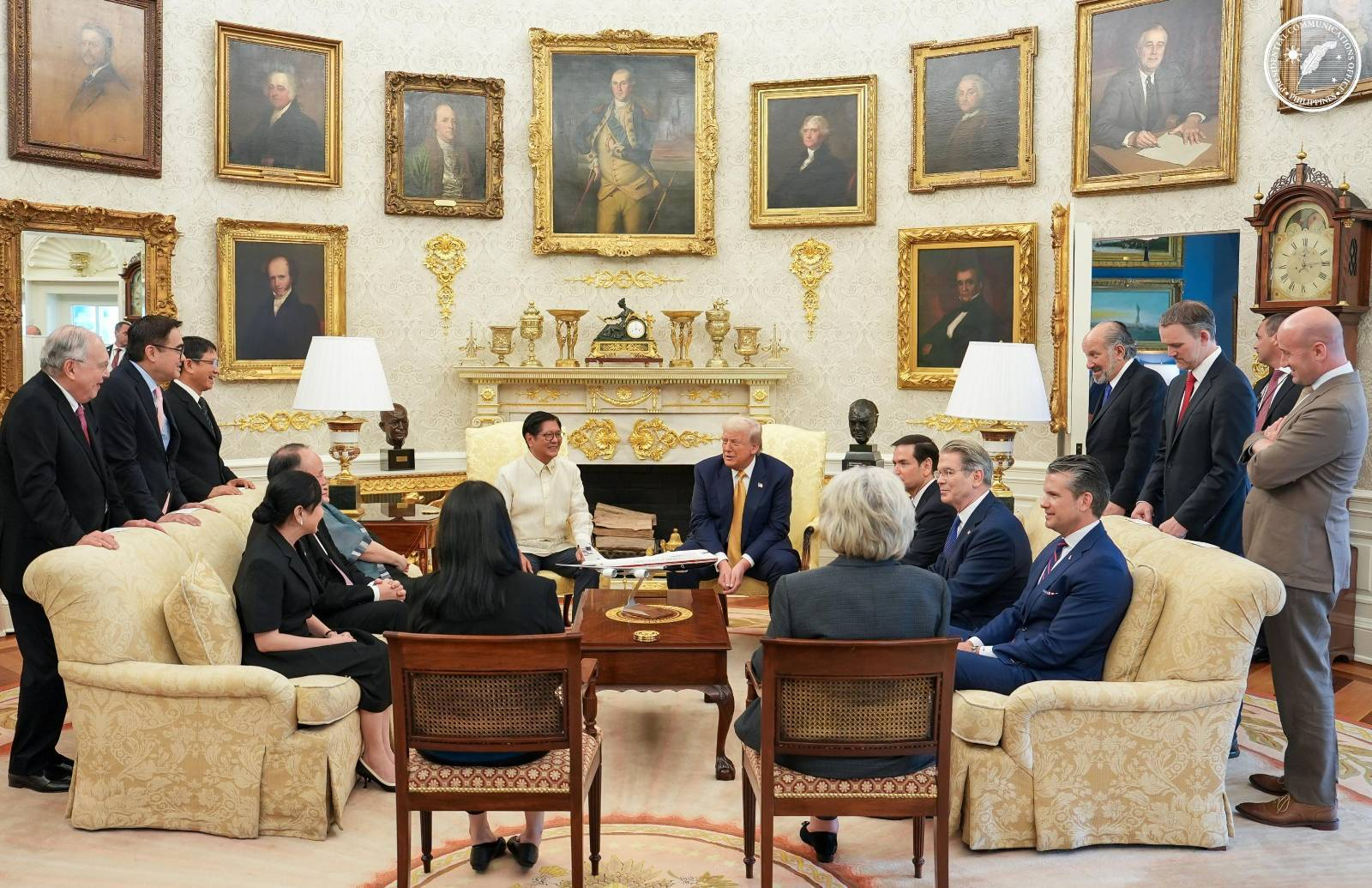

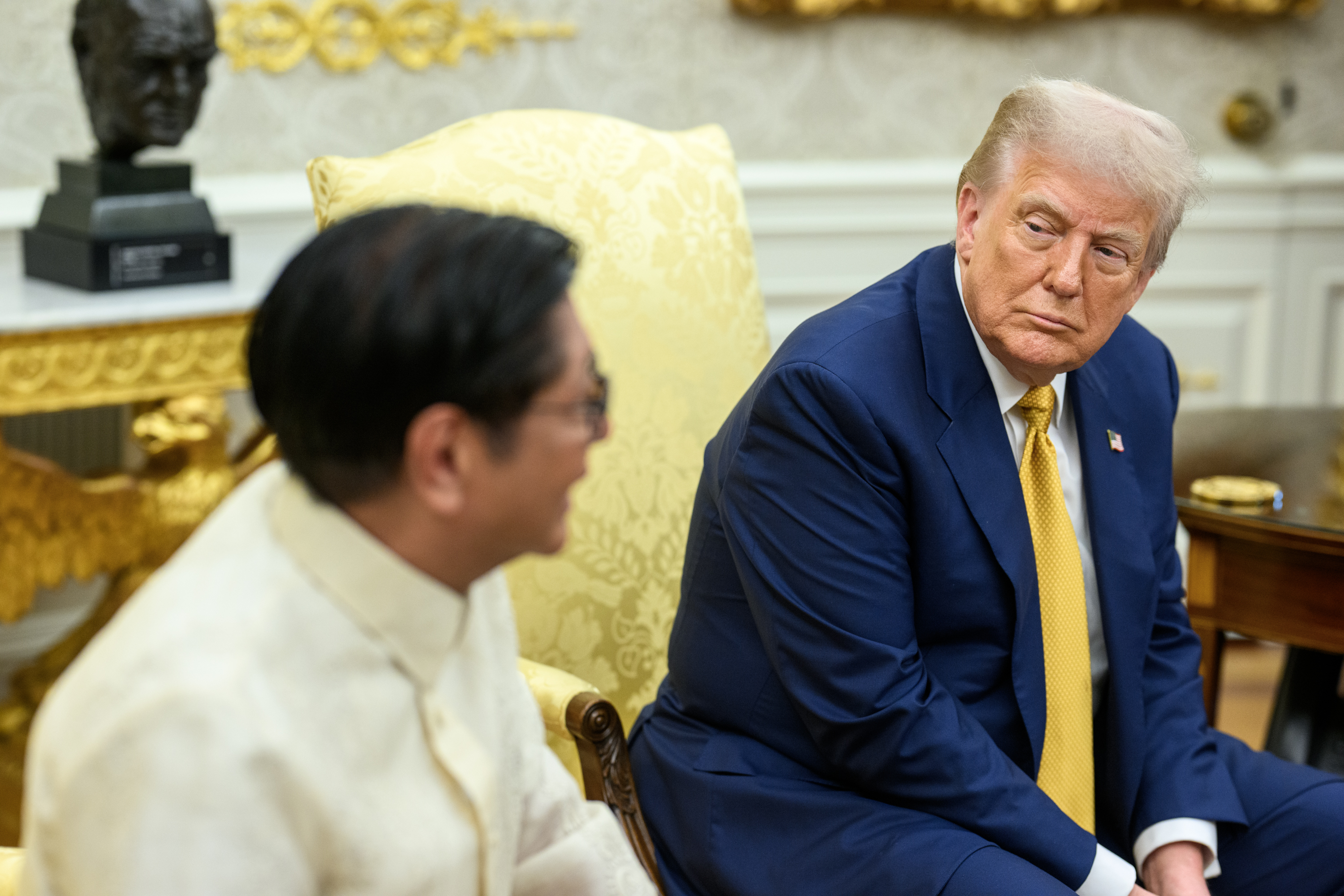

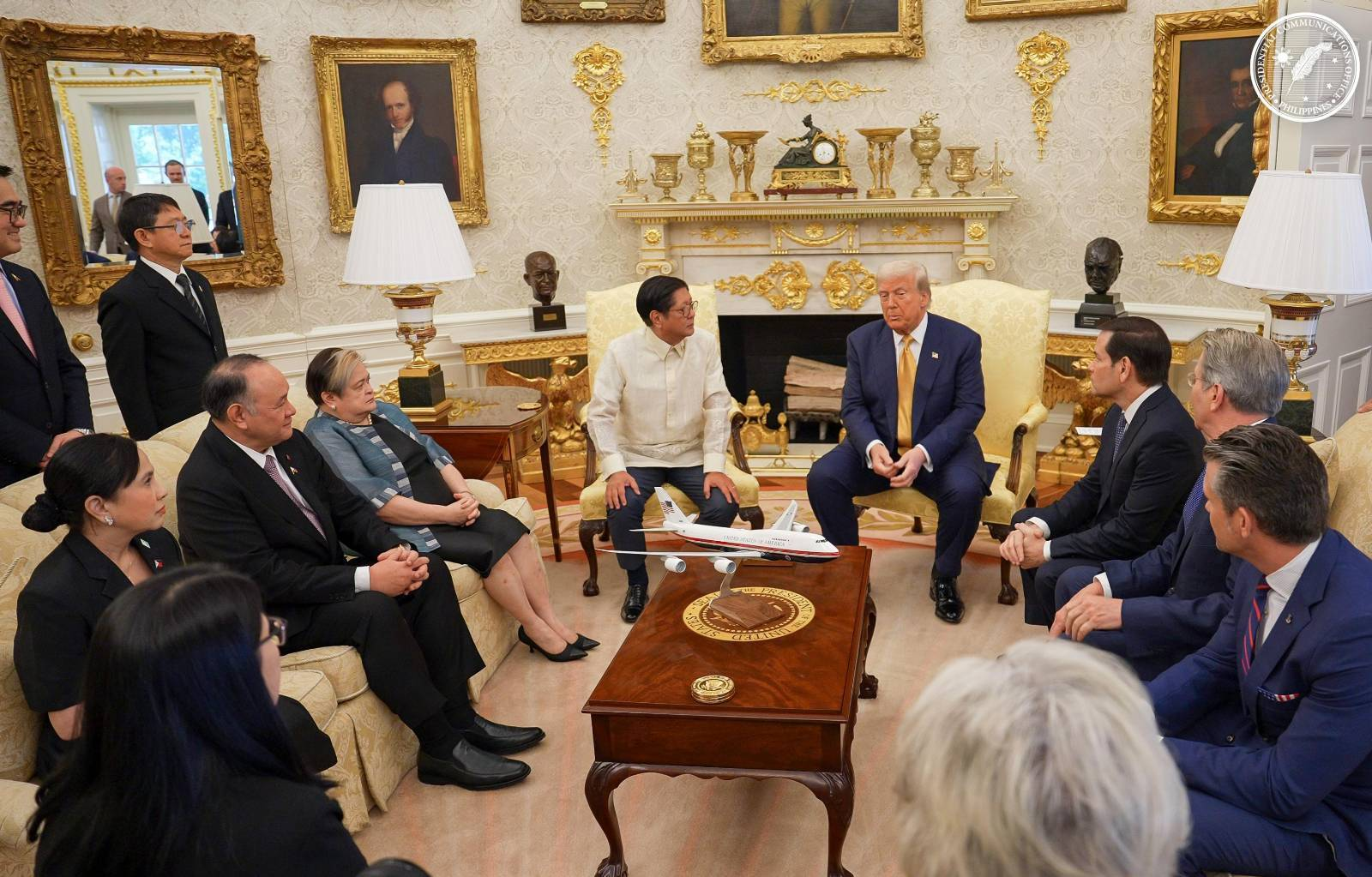

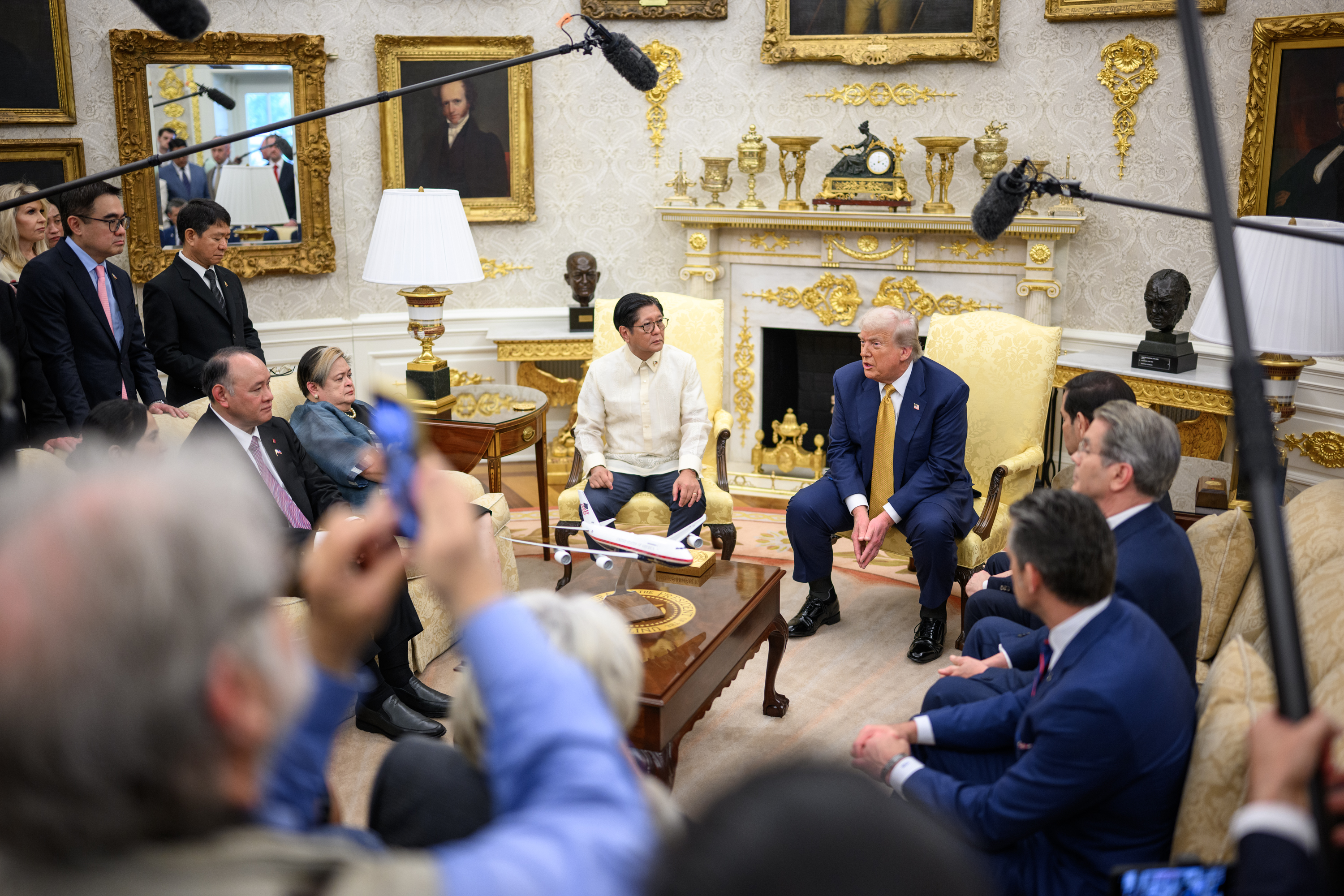

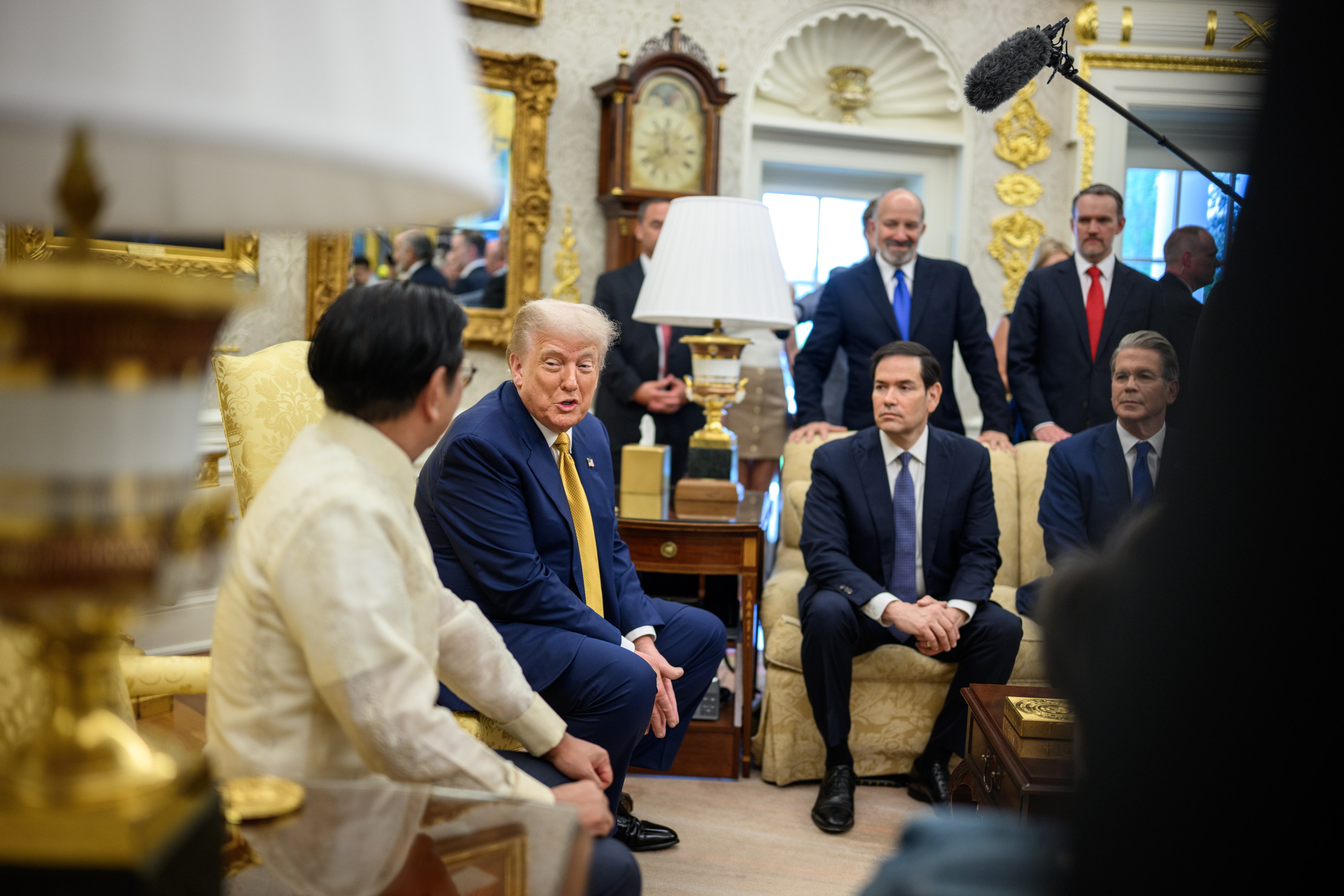

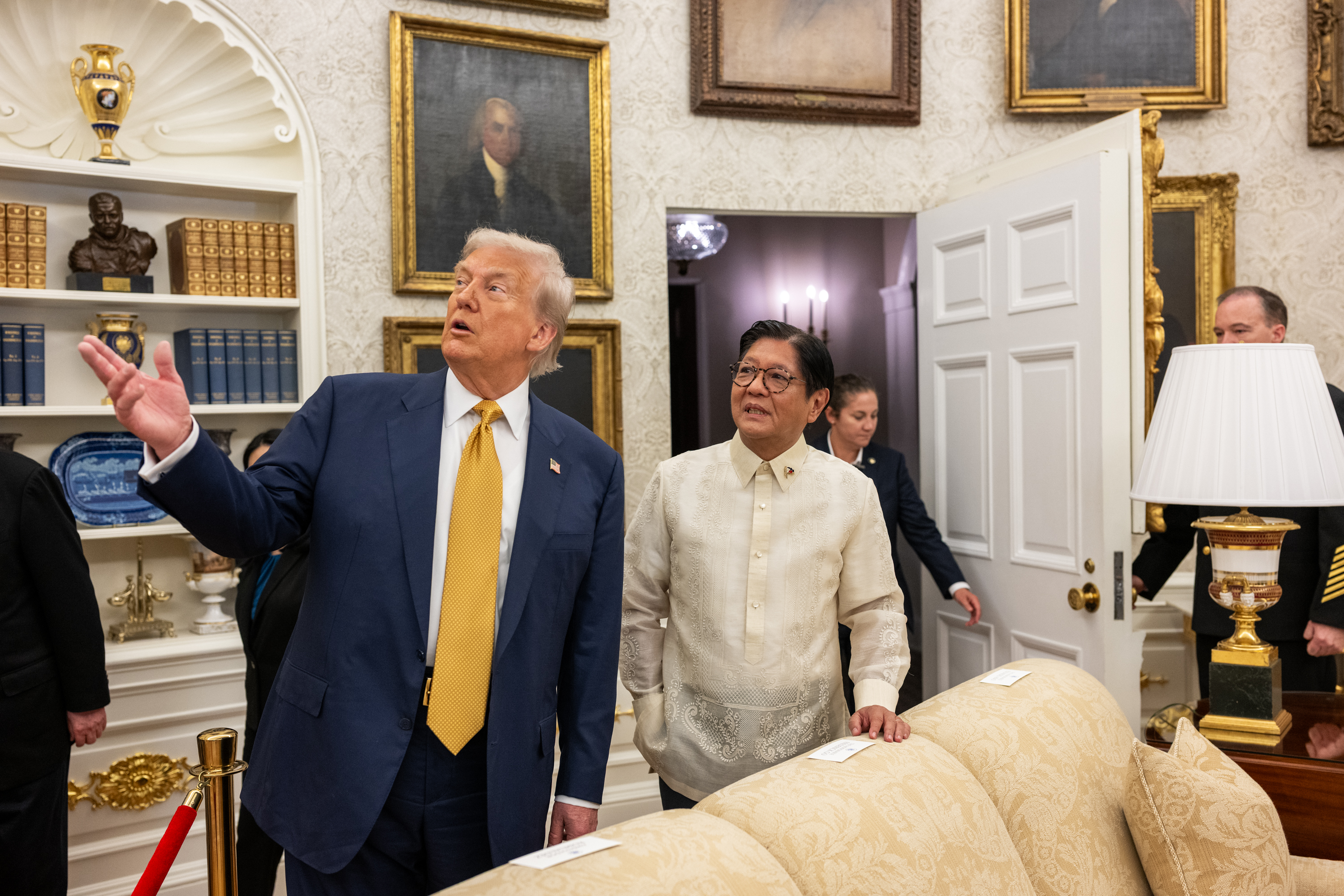

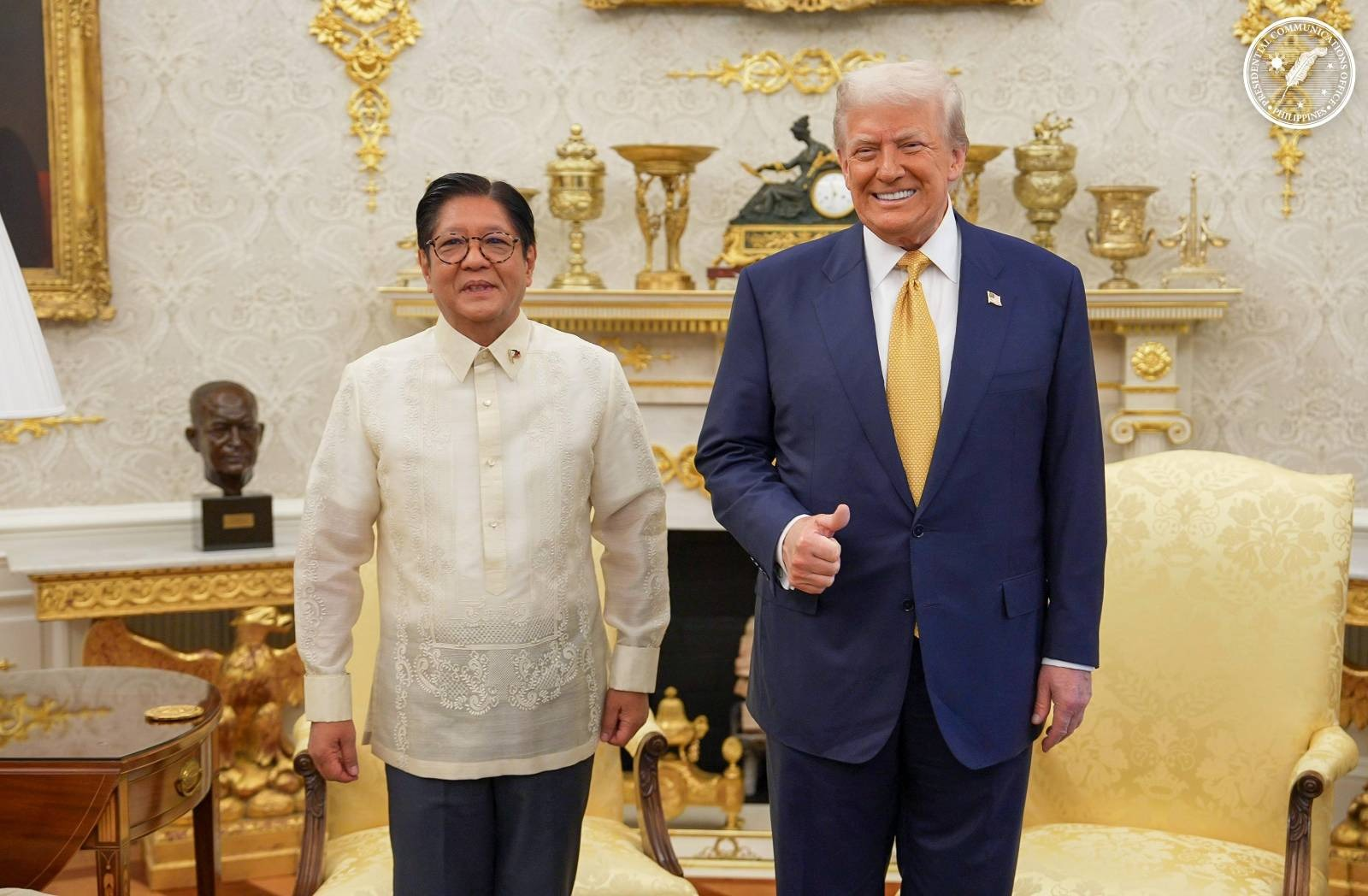

== Qatar ==
Table of Trips
Start	End	Guest	Title	Reason
June 10, 1997	June 13, 1997	Hamad bin Khalifa Al Thani	Emir	Working visit.
October 2, 2001	October 5, 2001	Hamad bin Khalifa Al Thani	Emir	Working visit.
May 5, 2003	May 9, 2003	Hamad bin Khalifa Al Thani	Emir	Working visit.
April 13, 2011	April 14, 2011	Hamad bin Khalifa Al Thani	Emir	Working visit.
April 23, 2013	April 23, 2013	Hamad bin Khalifa Al Thani	Emir	Working visit.
February 24, 2015	February 24, 2015	Tamim bin Hamad Al Thani	Emir	Official Working visit.
May 13, 2015	May 15, 2015	Tamim bin Hamad Al Thani	Emir	Attended a summit at Camp David, Maryland, for Gulf Cooperation Council Members on Countering Violent Extremism.
April 10, 2018	April 10, 2018	Tamim bin Hamad Al Thani	Emir	Working visit.
July 7, 2019	July 12, 2019	Tamim bin Hamad Al Thani	Emir	Working visit.
January 31, 2022	January 31, 2022	Tamim bin Hamad Al Thani	Emir	Working visit.

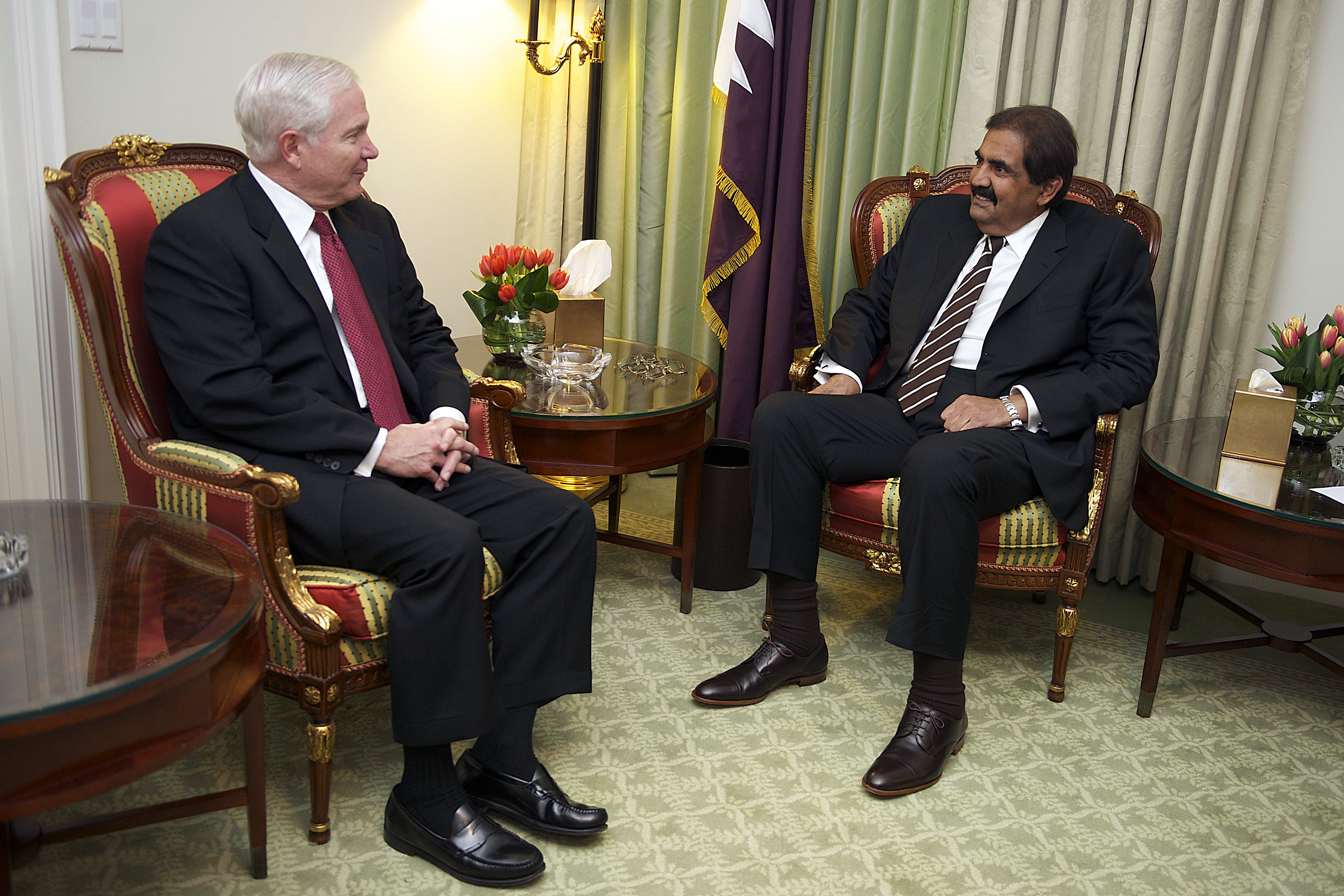

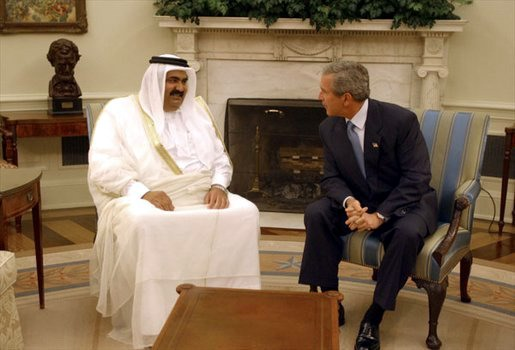

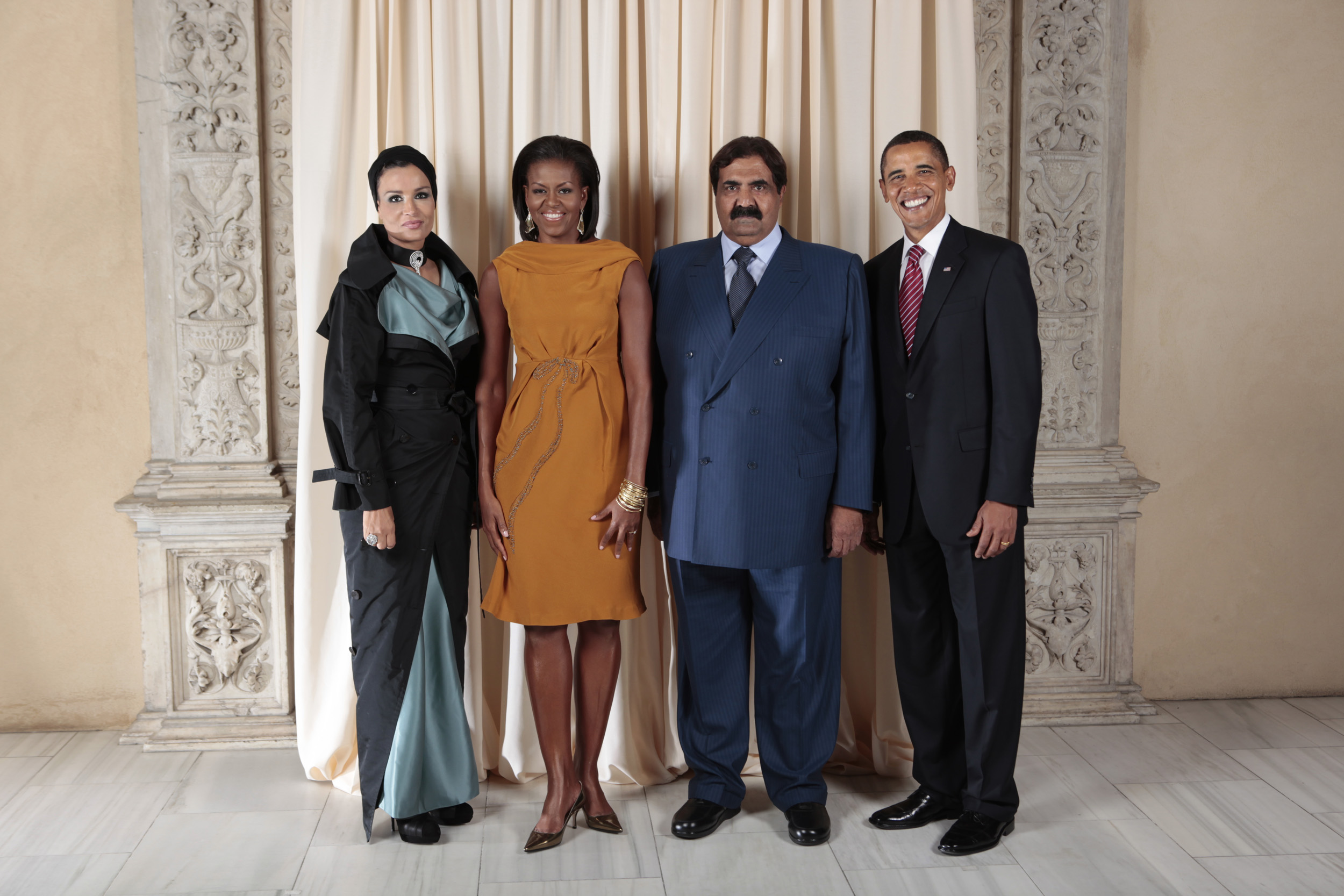

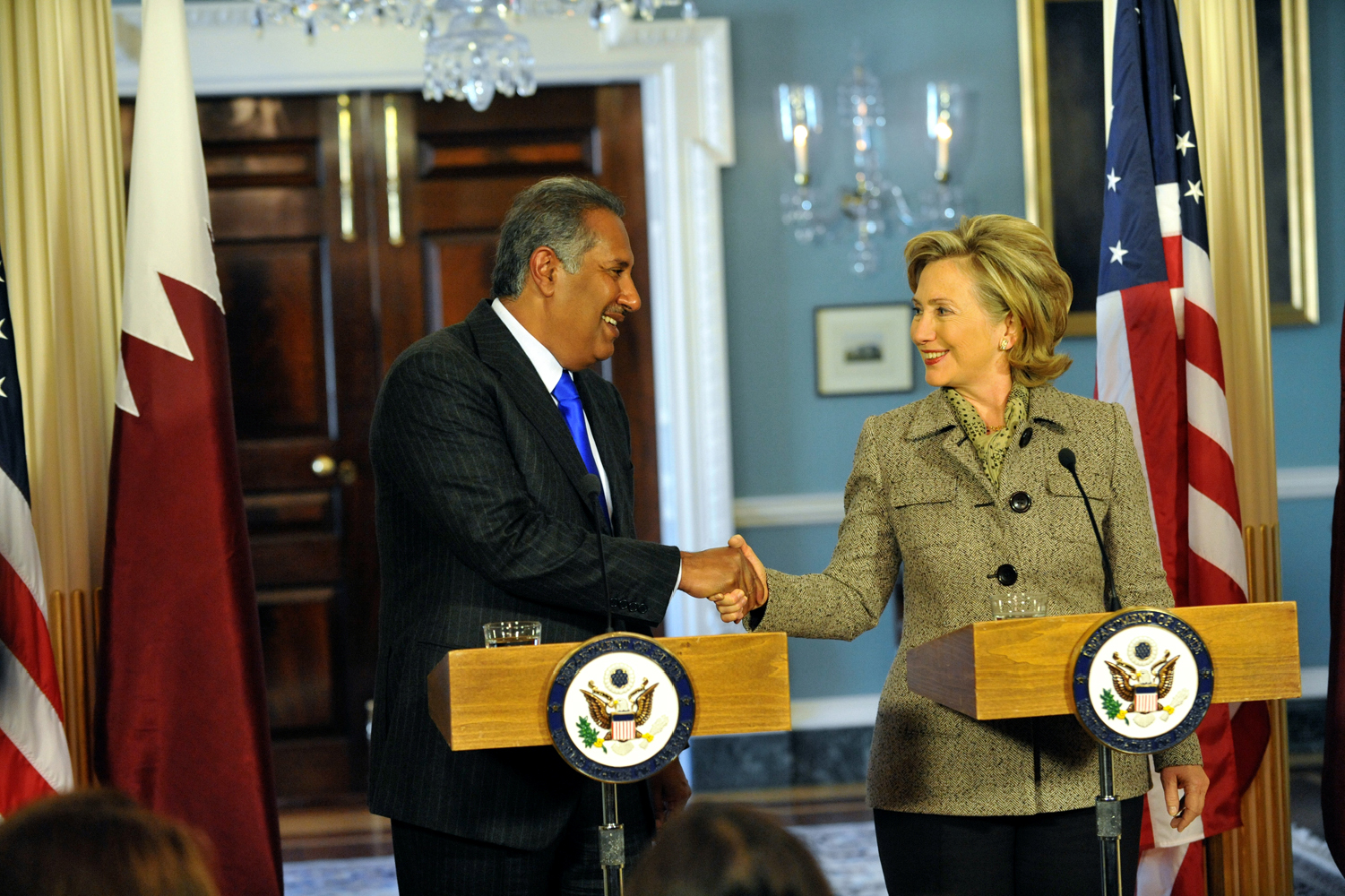

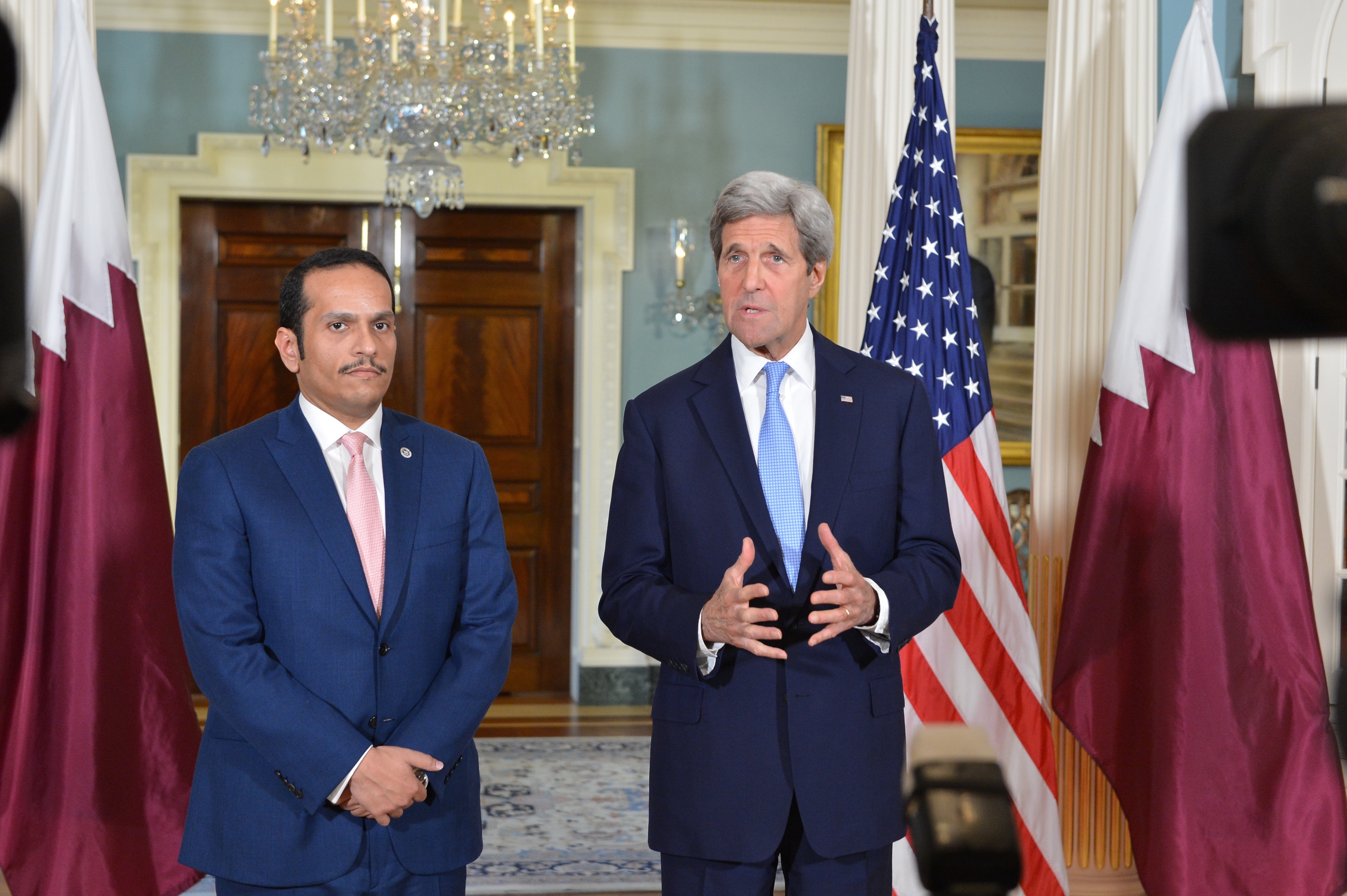

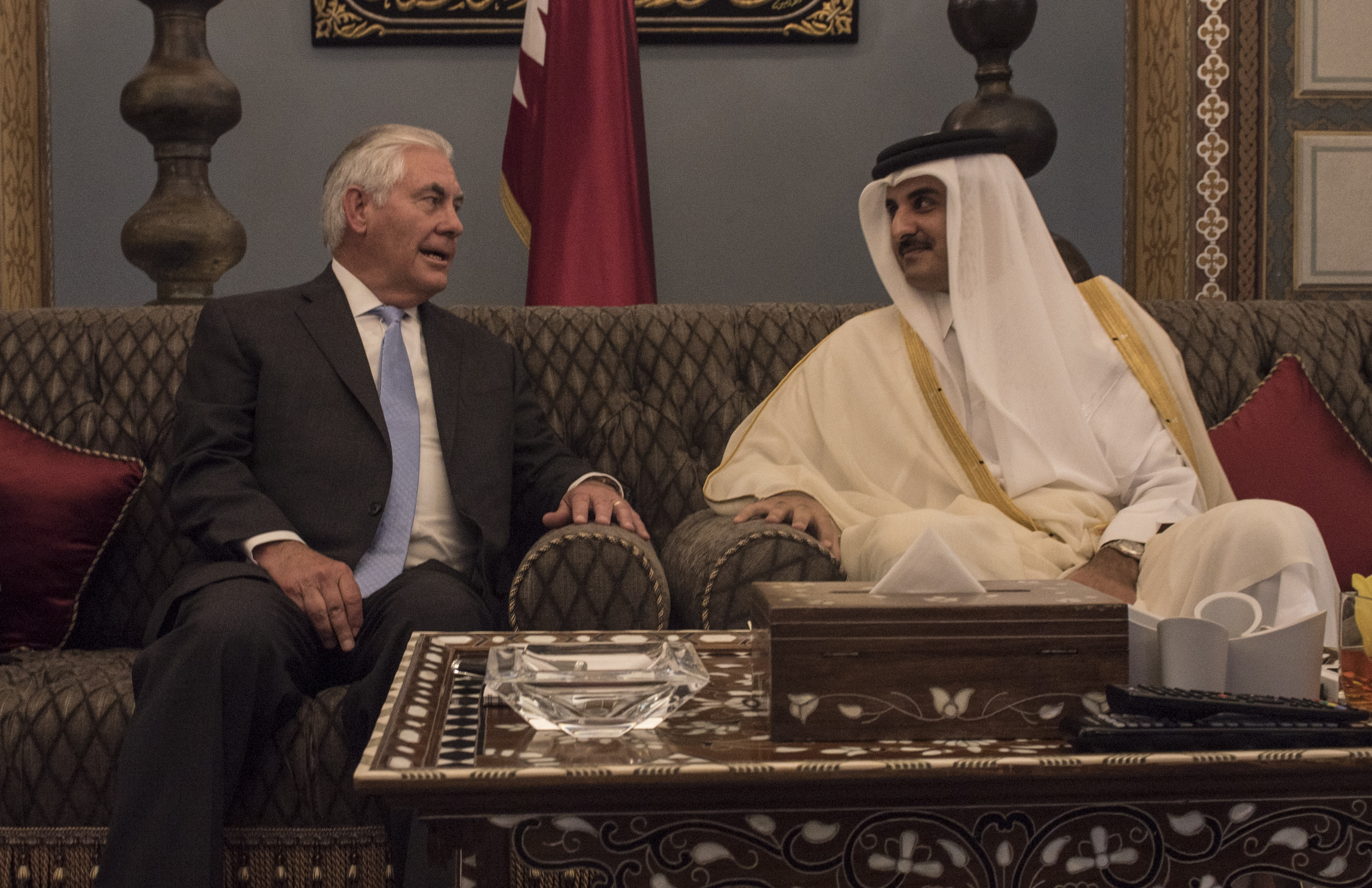

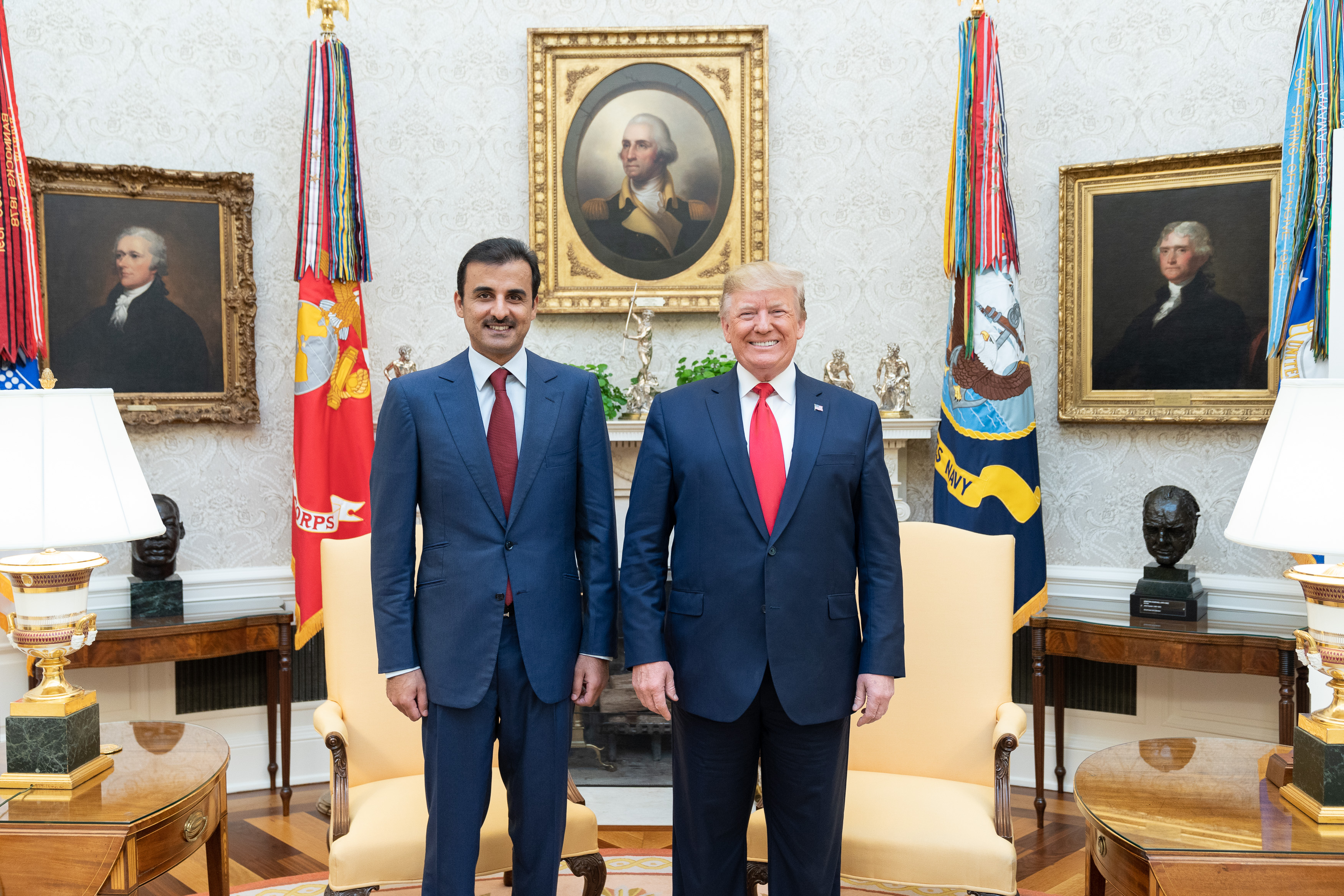

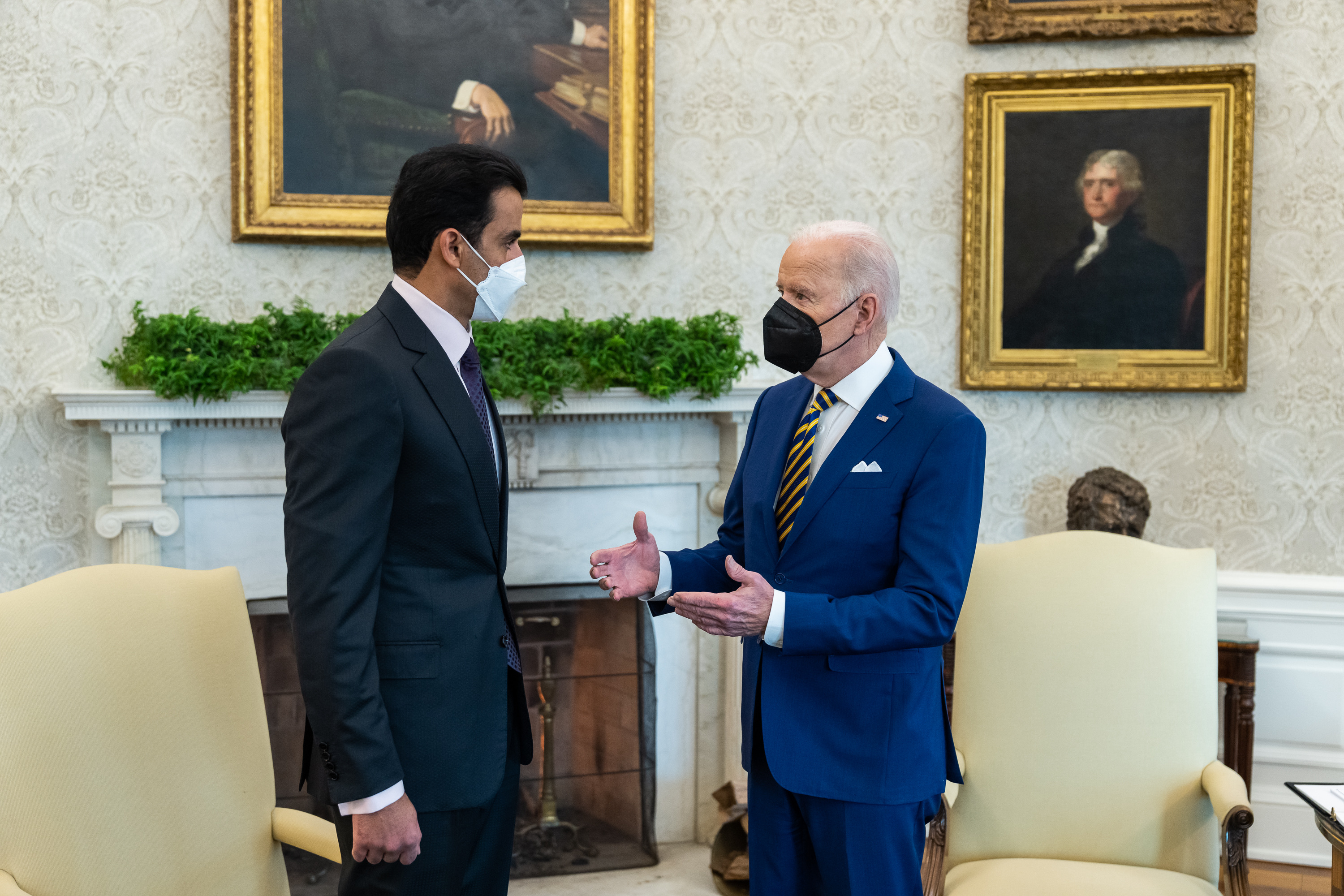

== Saudi Arabia ==
Table of Trips
Start	End	Guest	Title	Reason
January 30, 1957	February 8, 1957	Sa'ud ibn Abdilaziz	King	State visit to Washington, D.C.
February 13, 1962	February 14, 1962	Sa'ud ibn Abdilaziz	King	Informal visit. Arrived in U.S.November 22, 1961, for medical treatment in Boston; also visited Palm Beach.
June 21, 1966	June 23, 1966	Faisal I	King	State visit. In U.S. June 20–30; visited Williamsburg and New York City
May 27, 1971	May 30, 1971	Faisal I	King	Official visit. In U.S. May 24; visited San Francisco and Williamsburg.
October 27, 1978	October 27, 1978	Khalid	King	Private visit. Had luncheon with President Carter. Was receiving medical treatment at the Cleveland Clinic.
February 7, 1985	February 10, 1985	Fahd	King	State Visit.
November 15, 2008	November 14, 2008	Abdullah	King	Attended the G-20 Economic Summit meeting.
June 29, 2010	June 29, 2010	Abdullah	King	Working visit.
September 4, 2015	September 4, 2015	Salman	King	Official working visit.
March 19, 2018	March 24, 2018	Mohammed bin Salman	Crown Prince	Working Visit.

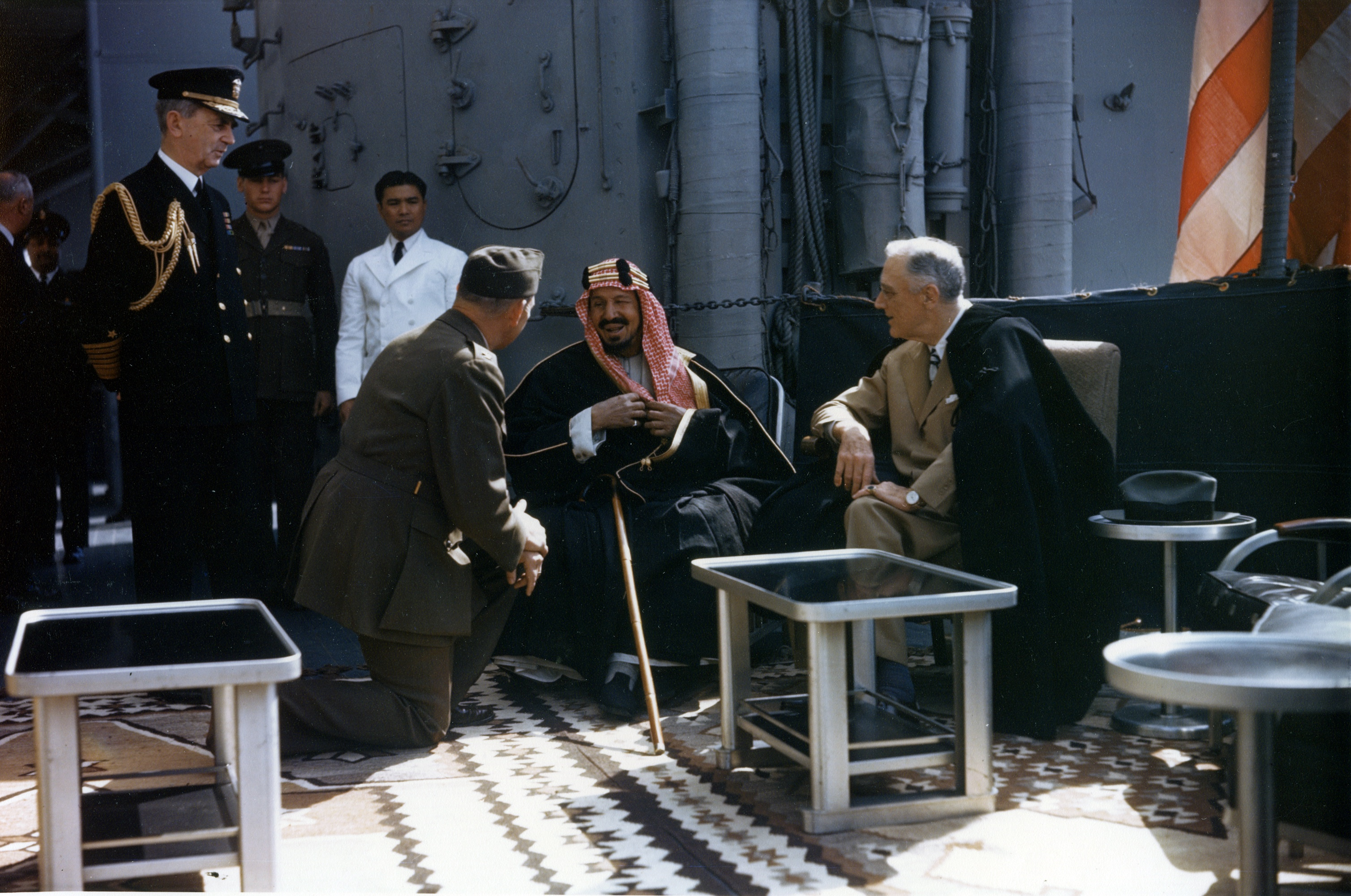

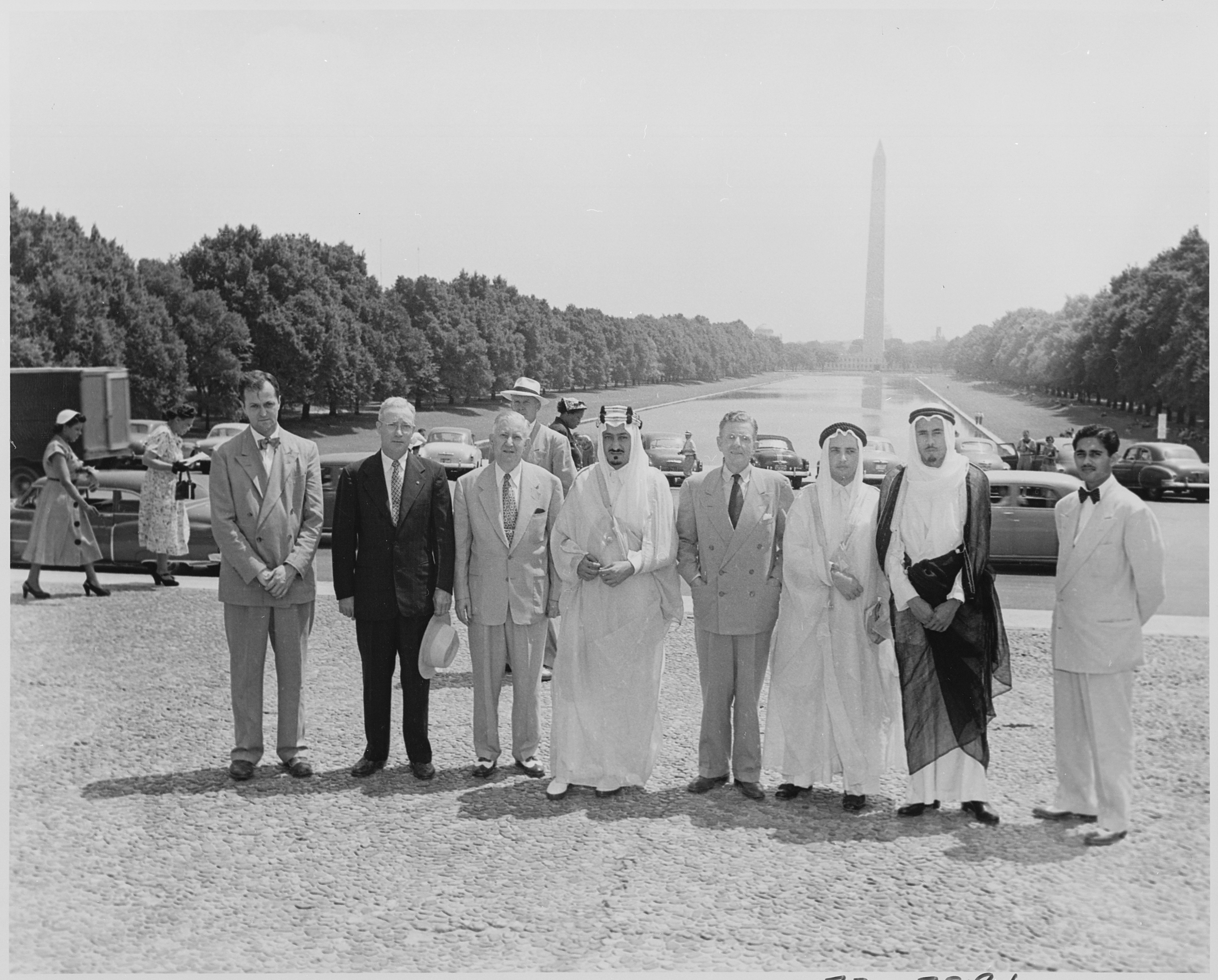

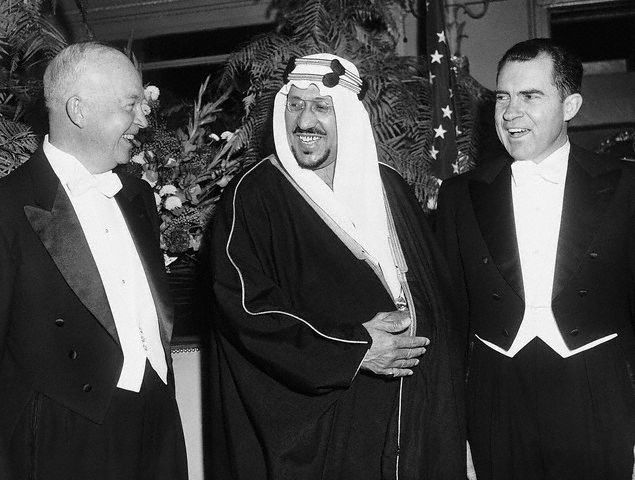

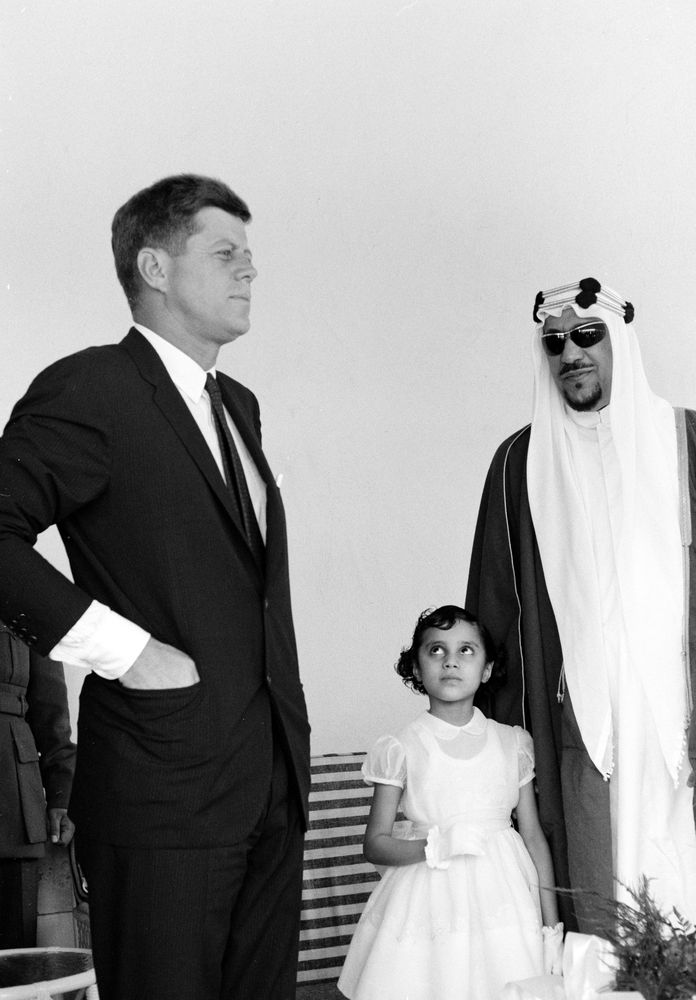

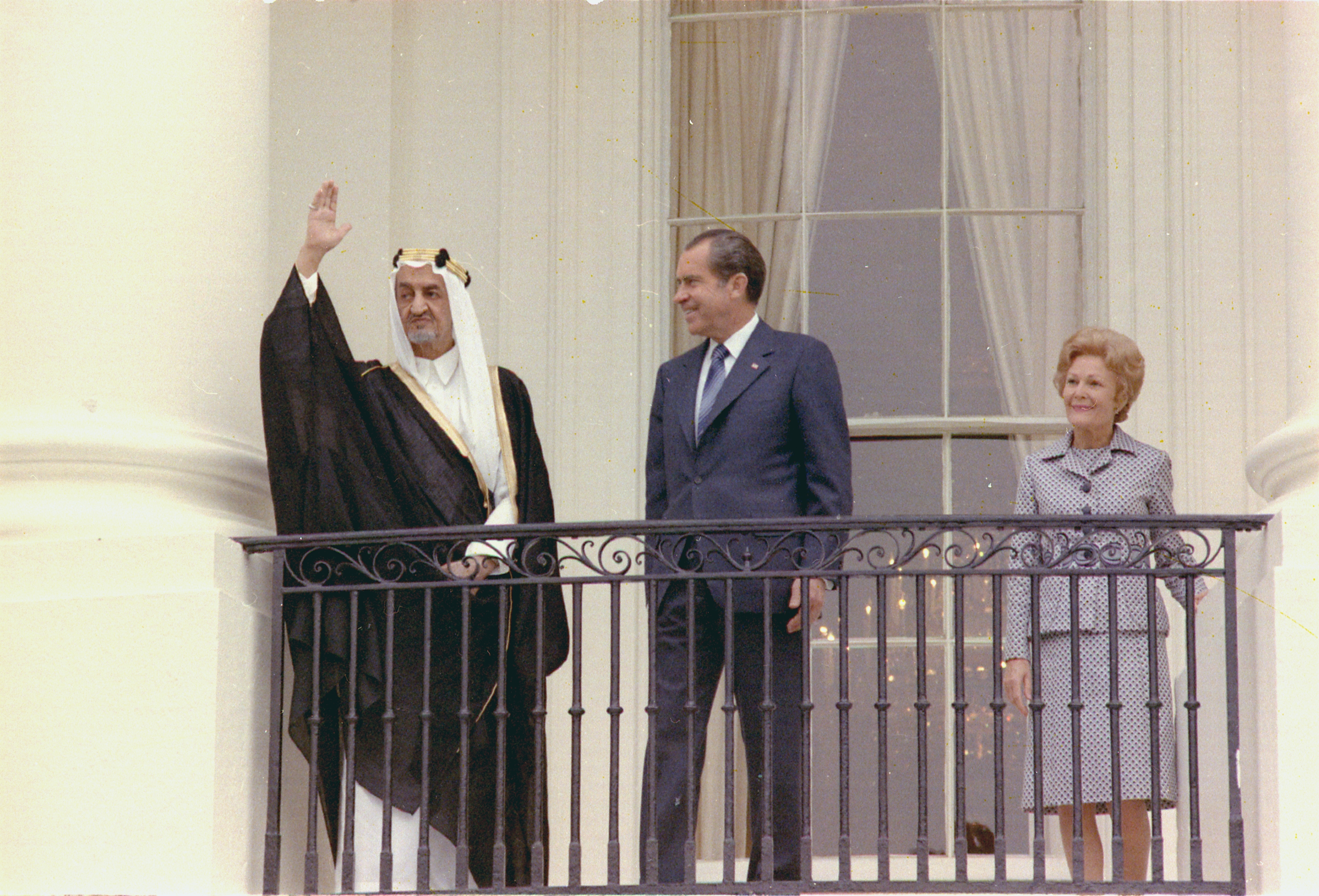

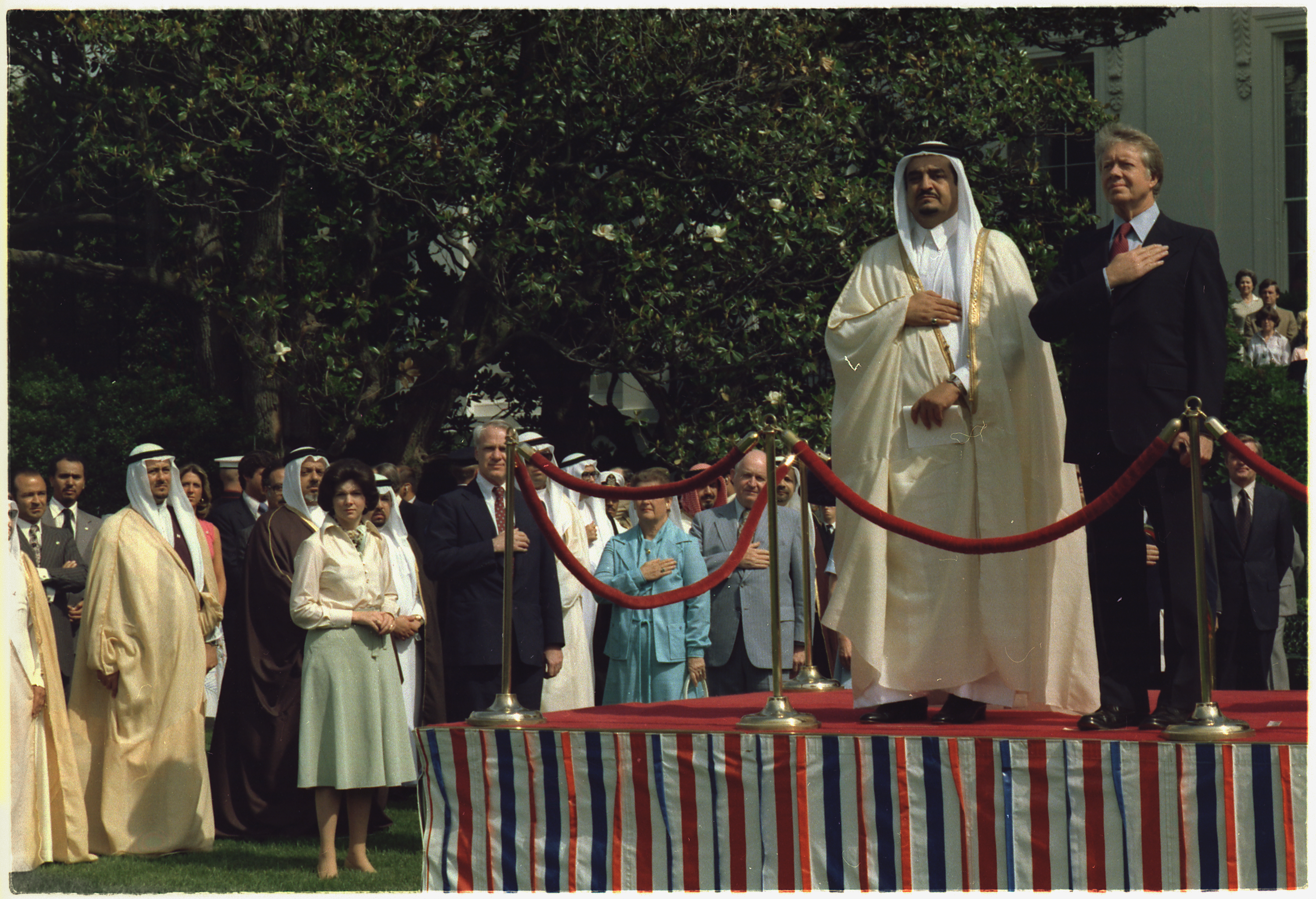

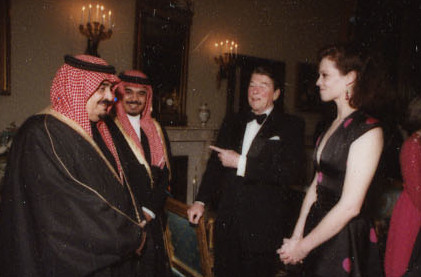

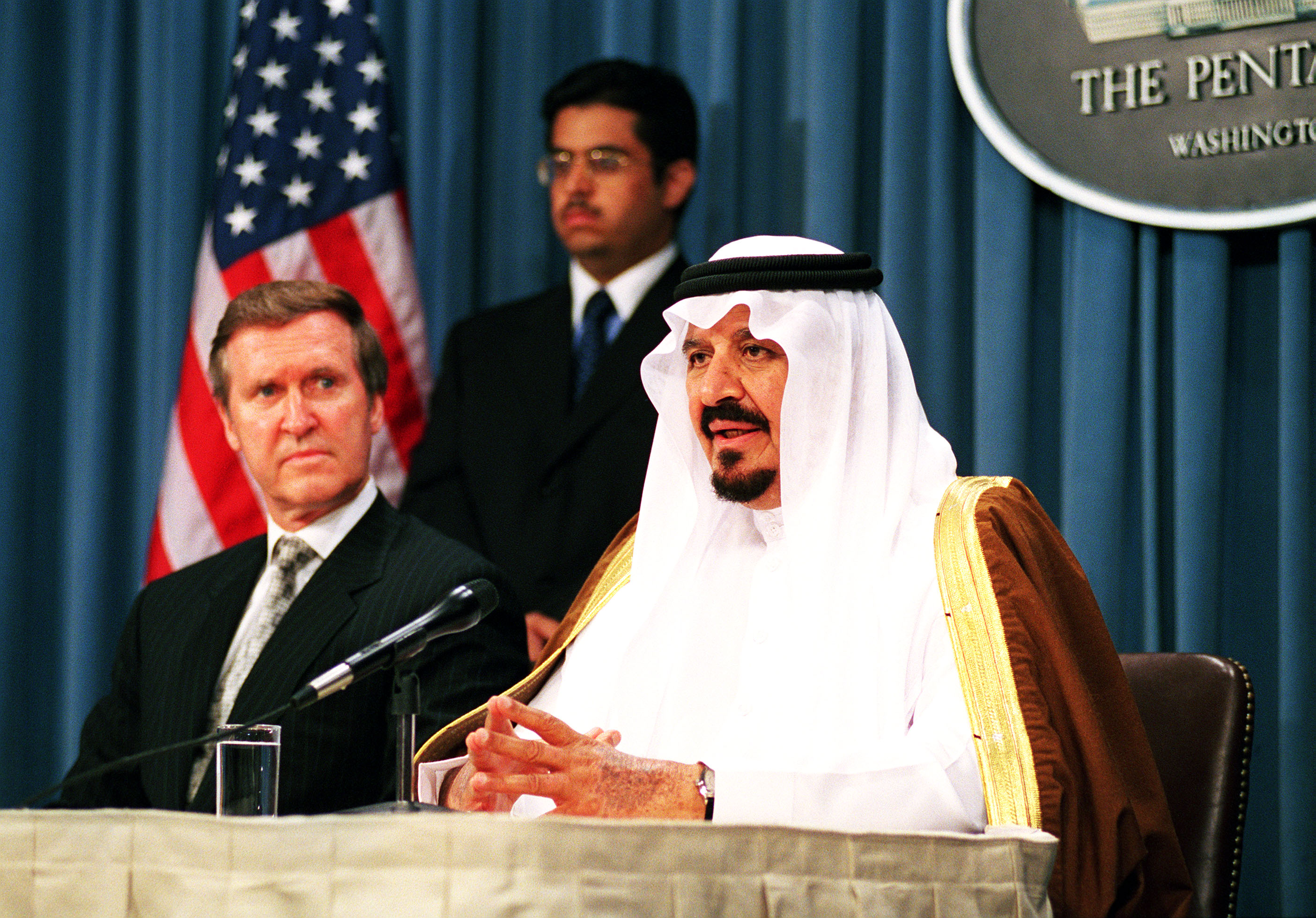

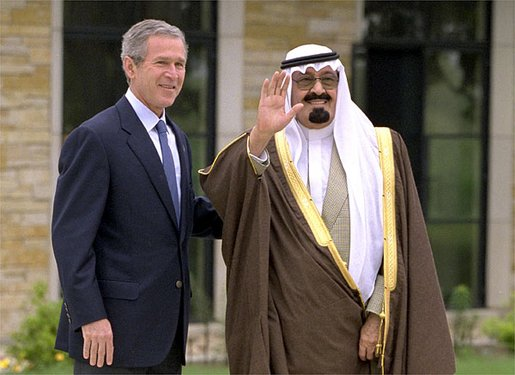

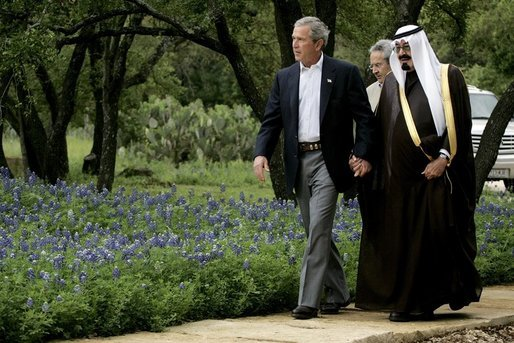

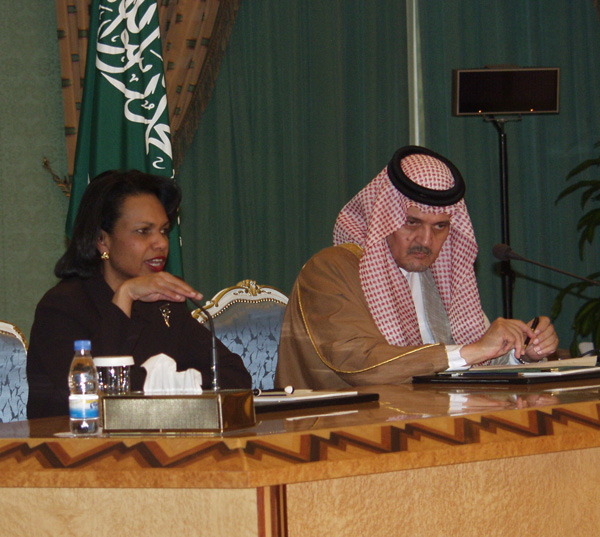

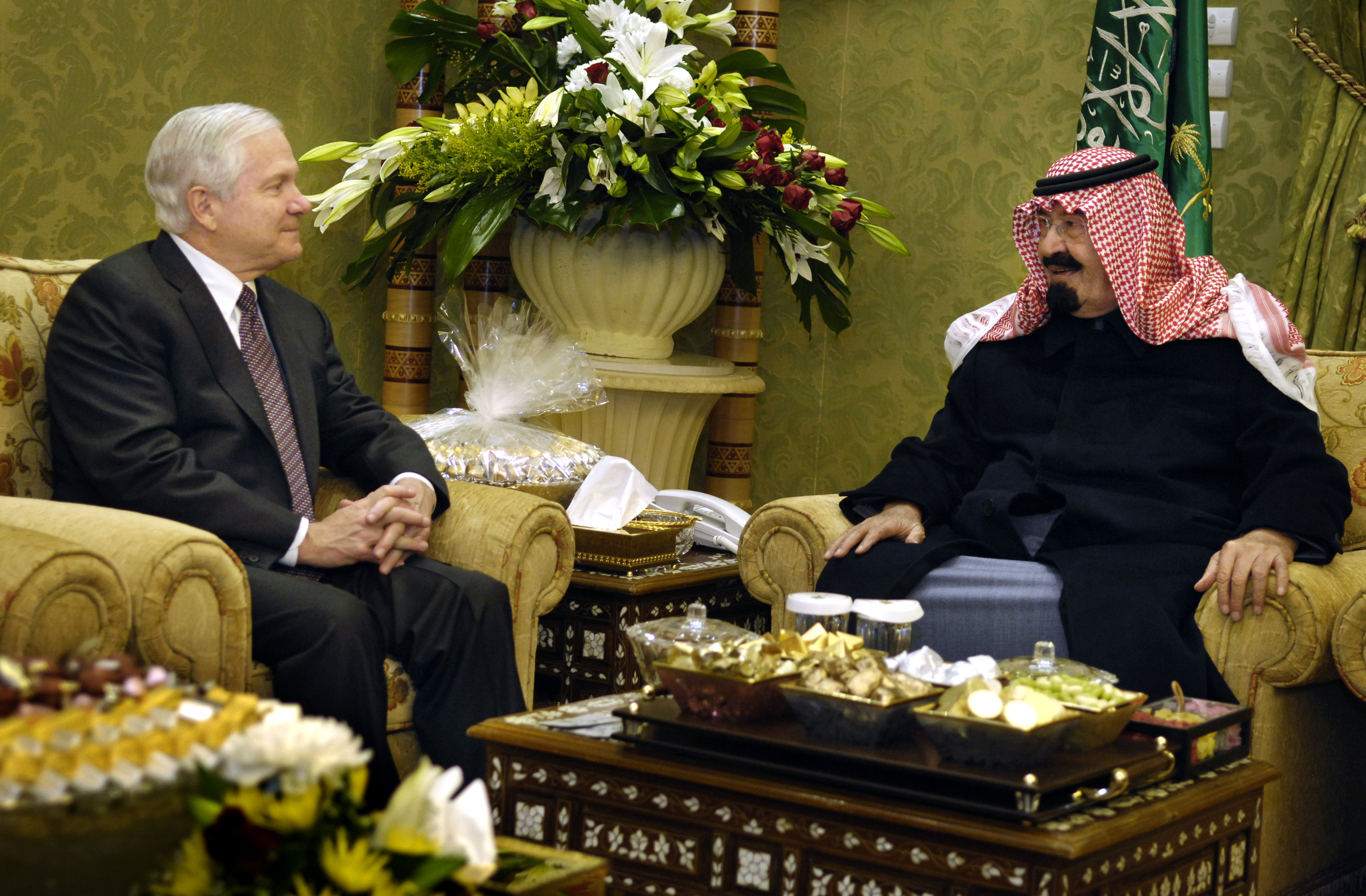

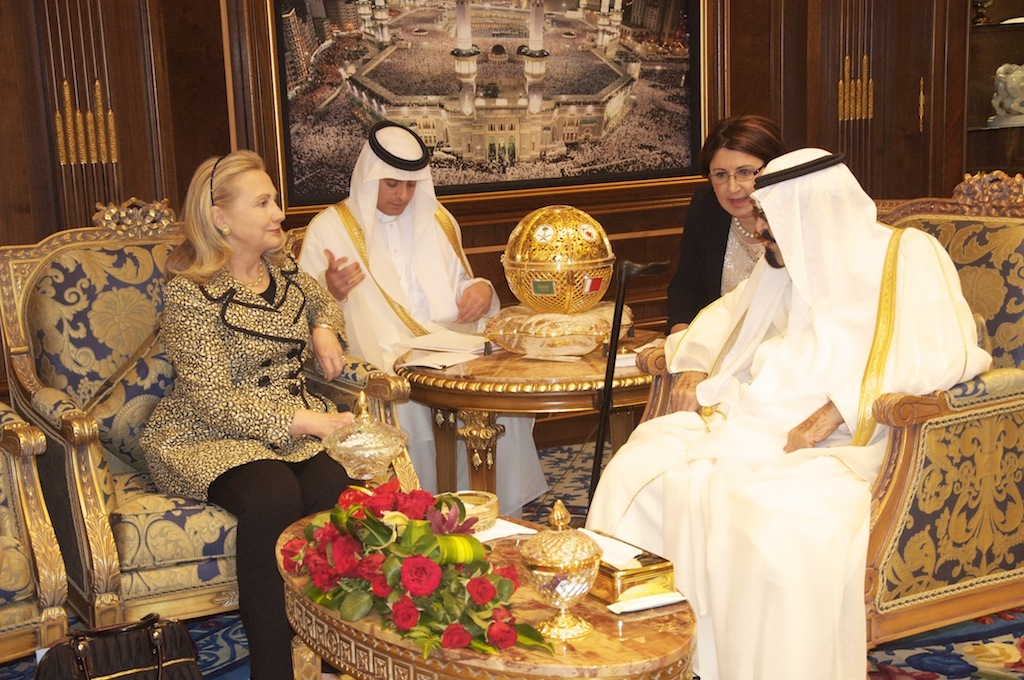

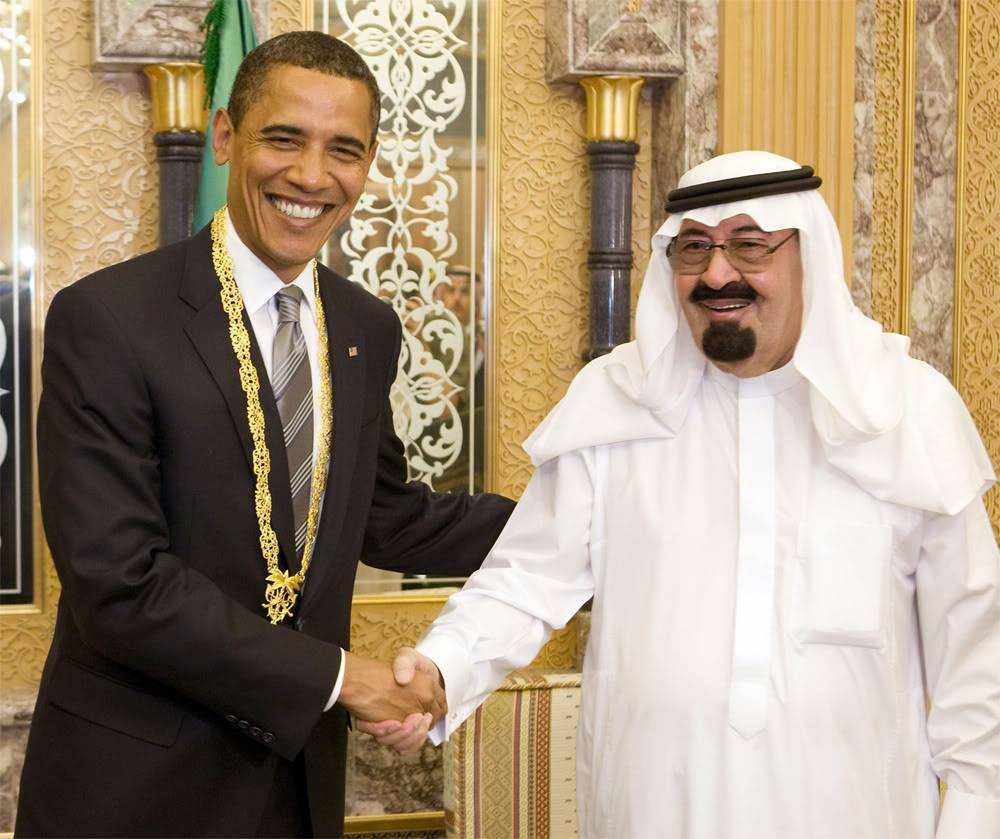

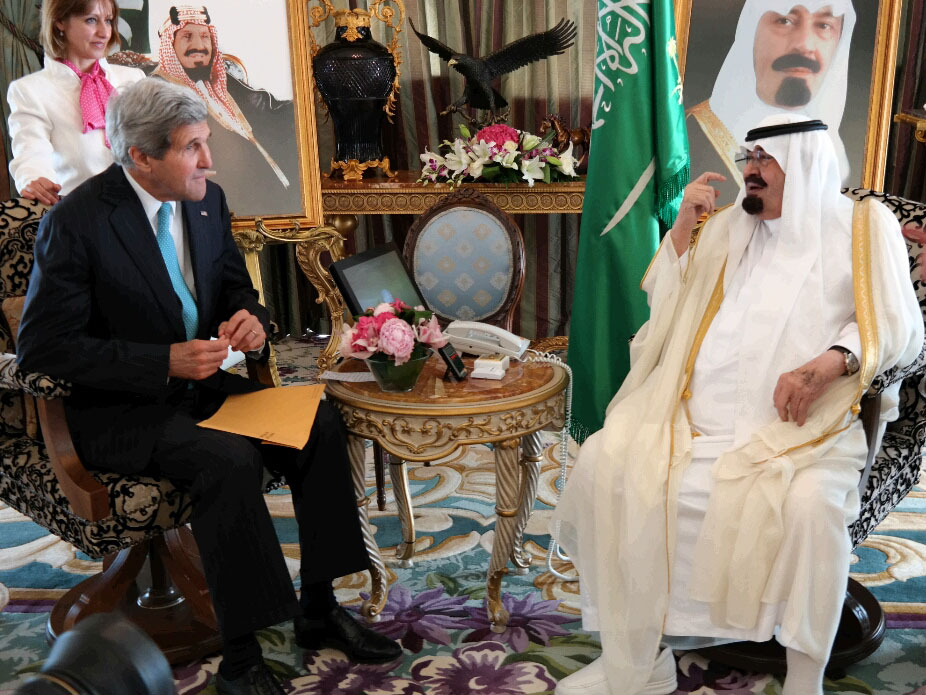

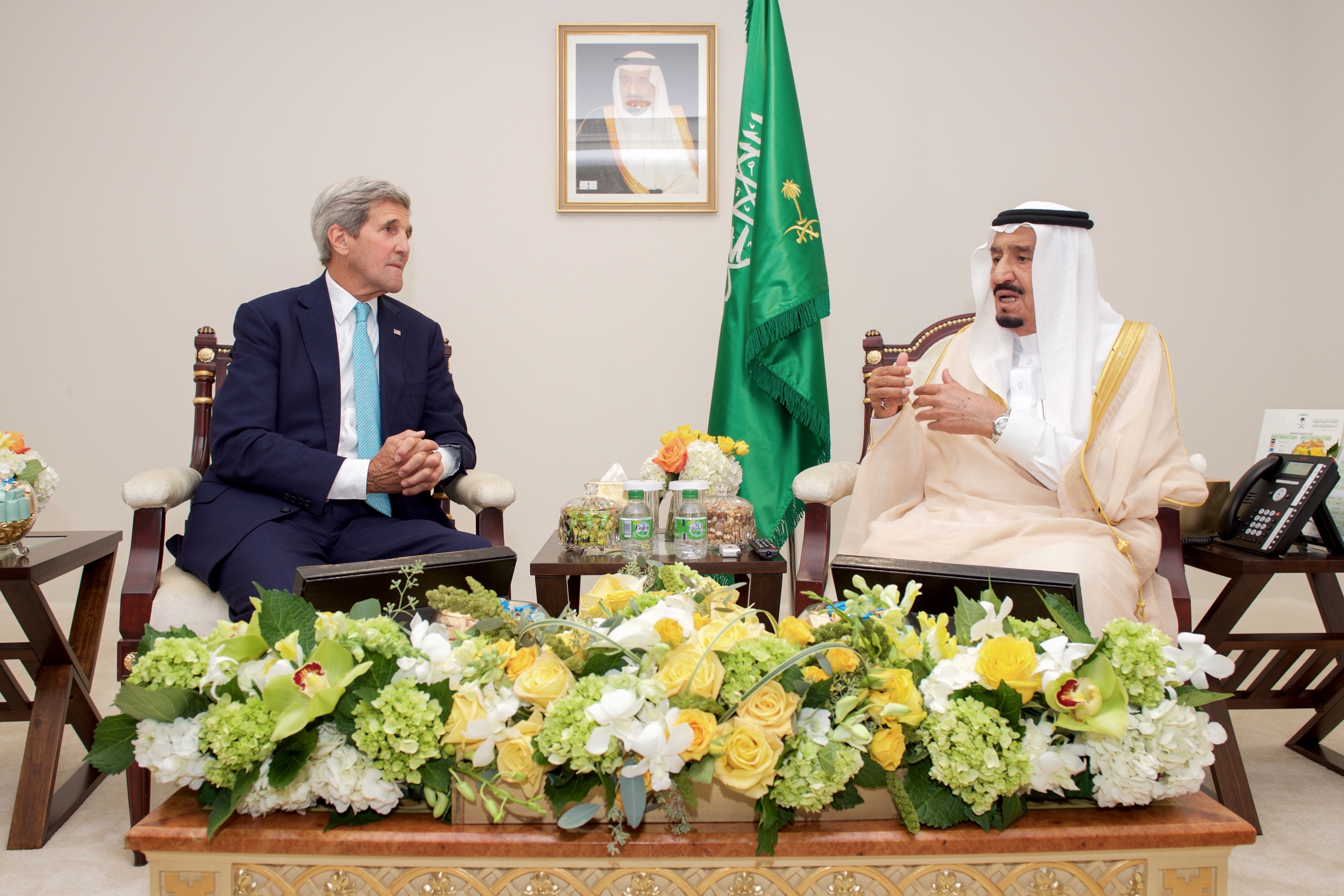

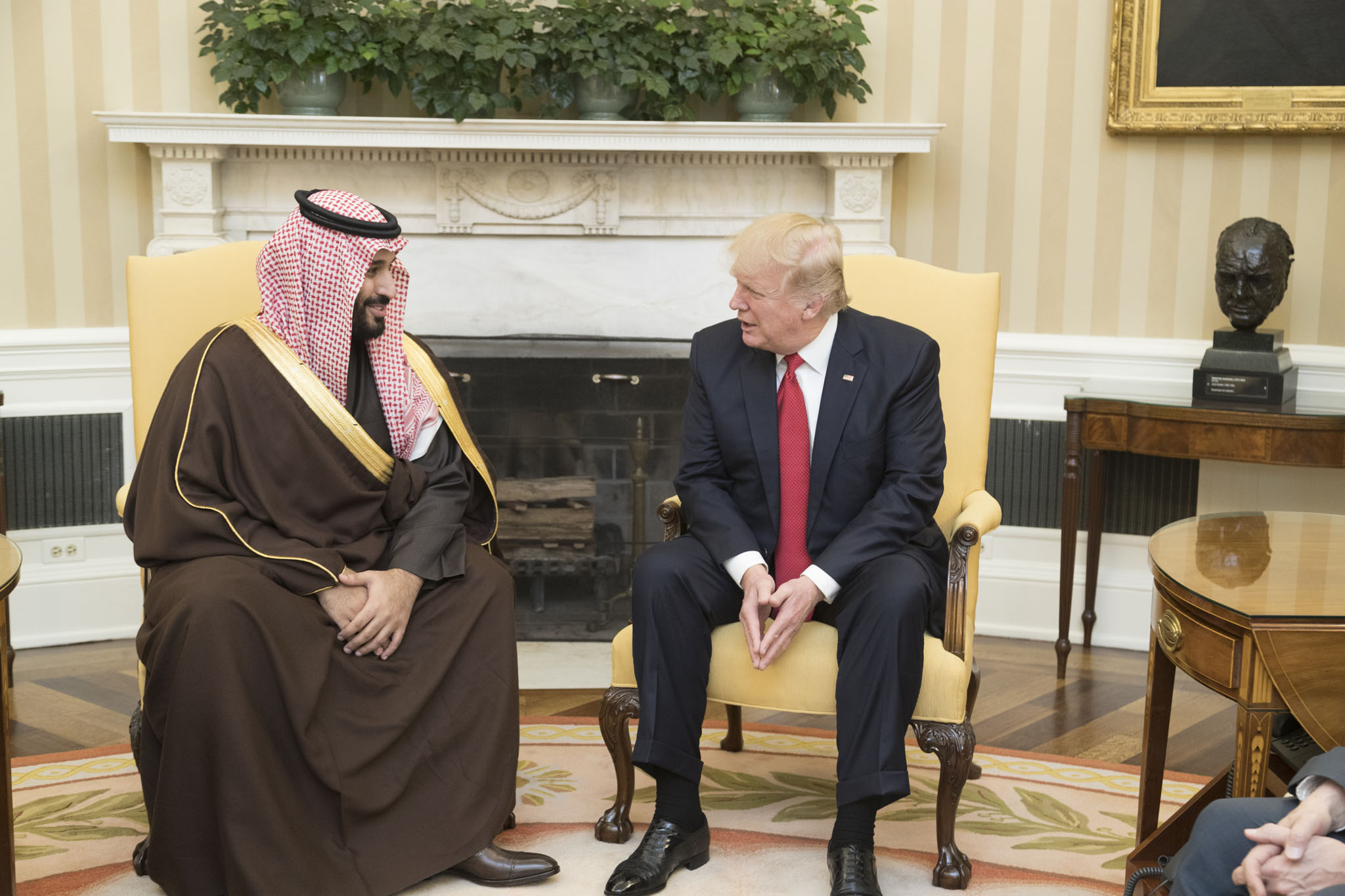

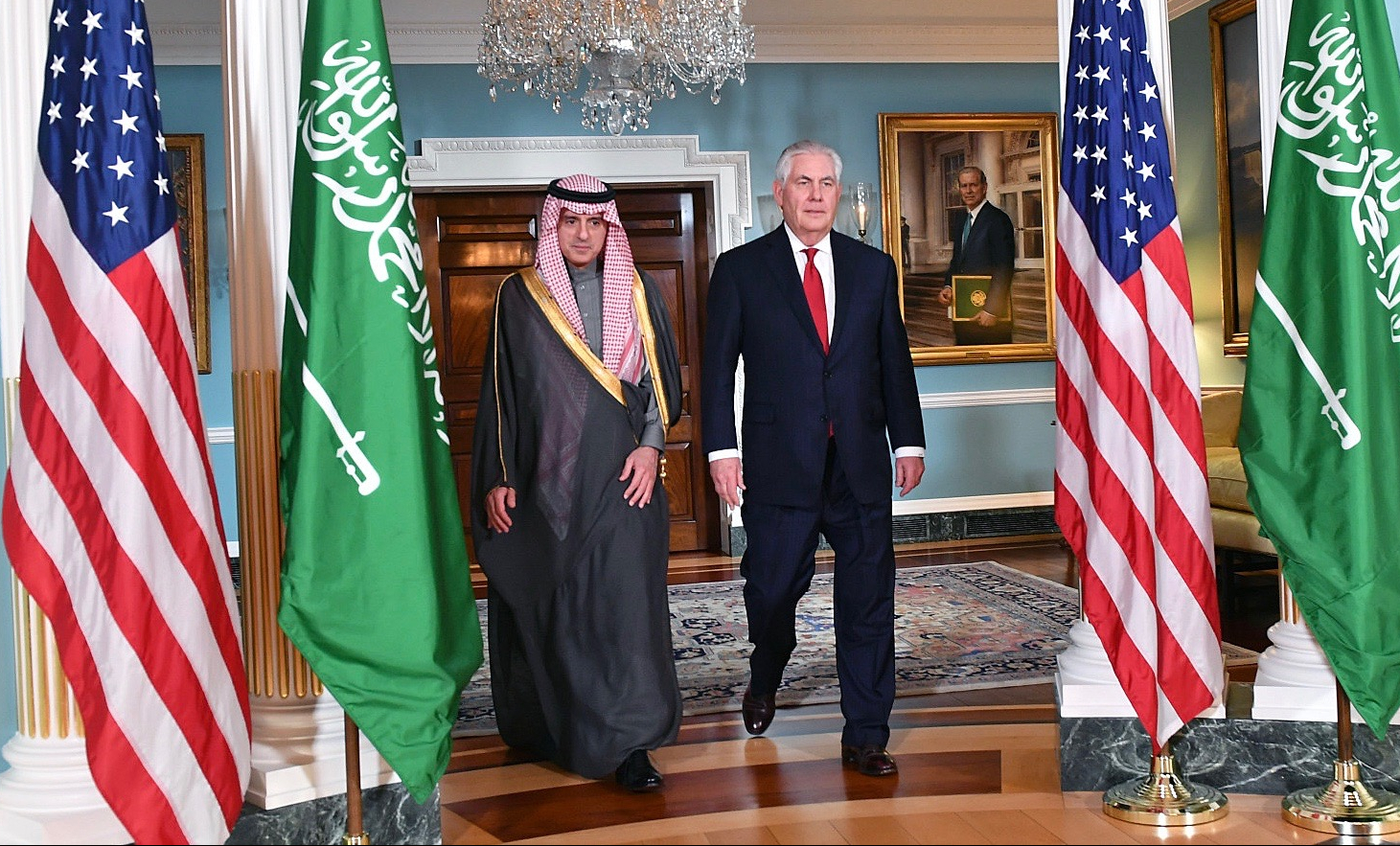

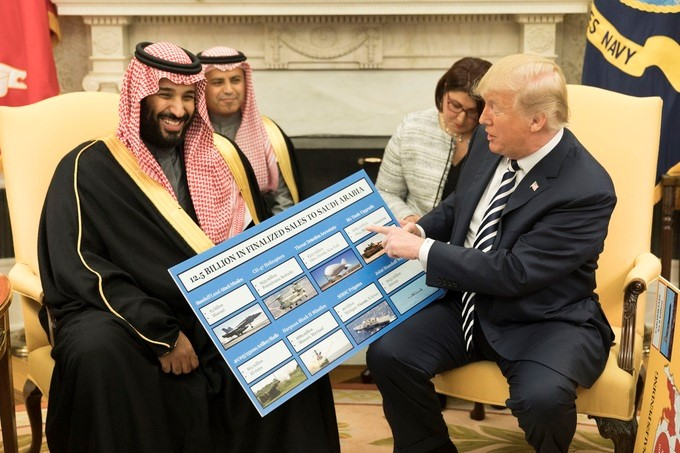

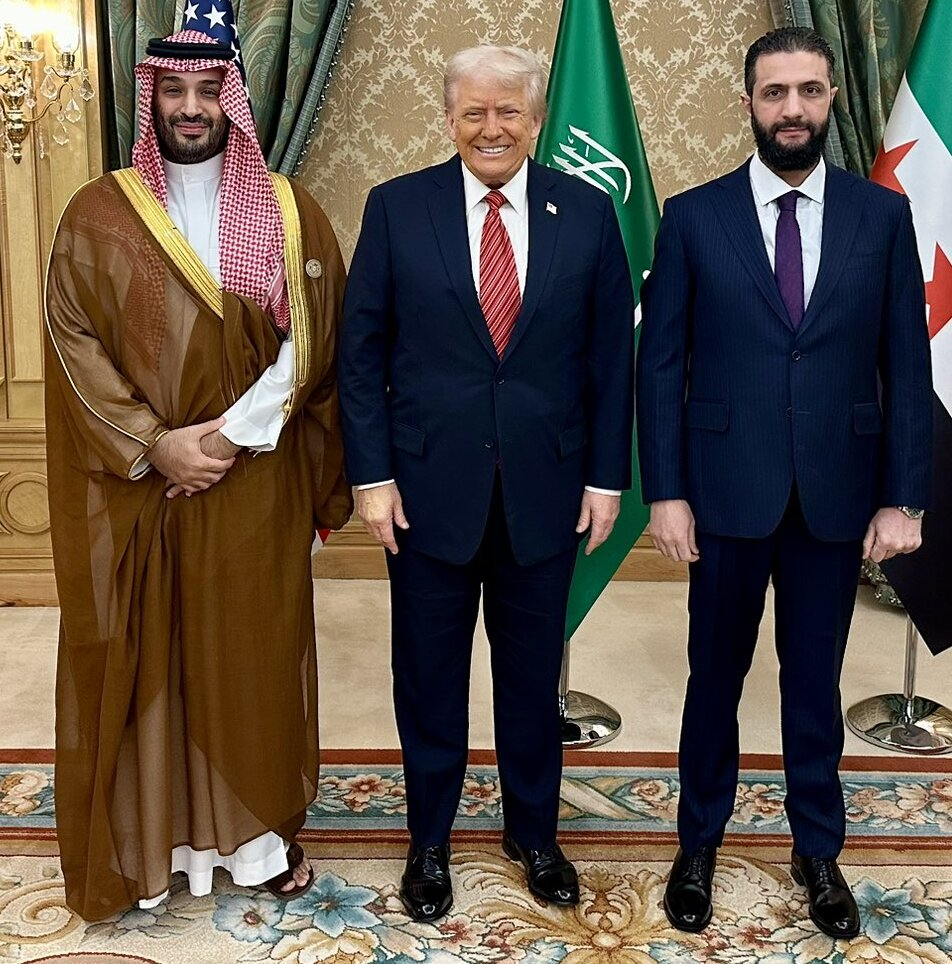

== Singapore ==
Table of Trips
Start	End	Guest	Title	Reason
October 17, 1967	October 19, 1967	Lee Kuan Yew	Prime Minister	Official visit. In U.S. October 16–27; visited Williamsburg, New York City, Boston, St. Louis, Chicago, San Francisco, and Los Angeles.
December 10, 1968	December 10, 1968	Lee Kuan Yew	Prime Minister	Informal visit. Arrived in U.S. November 14; visiting fellow at Harvard University's John F. Kennedy School of Government.
May 12, 1969	May 14, 1969	Lee Kuan Yew	Prime Minister	Private visit.
November 5, 1970	November 5, 1970	Lee Kuan Yew	Prime Minister	Private visit.
April 10, 1973	April 10, 1973	Lee Kuan Yew	Prime Minister	Private visit. In U.S. March 25 – April 11. Met with President Nixon April 10.
May 8, 1975	May 8, 1975	Lee Kuan Yew	Prime Minister	Private visit.
October 4, 1977	October 12, 1977	Lee Kuan Yew	Prime Minister	Official visit.
October 3, 1978	October 3, 1978	Lee Kuan Yew	Prime Minister	Private visit.
June 16, 1981	June 19, 1981	Lee Kuan Yew	Prime Minister	Private visit. Met with President Reagan
July 18, 1982	July 22, 1982	Lee Kuan Yew	Prime Minister	Private visit. Met with President Reagan
October 7, 1985	October 11, 1985	Lee Kuan Yew	Prime Minister	Official Visit.
April 13, 1988	April 13, 1988	Lee Kuan Yew	Prime Minister	Met with President Reagan during a private visit.
November 17, 1993	November 21, 1993	Goh Chok Tong	Prime Minister	Attended Asia-Pacific Economic Cooperation meeting in Seattle.
June 9, 2001	June 14, 2001	Goh Chok Tong	Prime Minister	Met with President Bush June 11 during a private visit.
May 6, 2003	May 6, 2003	Goh Chok Tong	Prime Minister	Working visit. Signed free-trade agreement.
May 3, 2004	May 7, 2004	Goh Chok Tong	Prime Minister	Working visit.
July 11, 2005	July 12, 2005	Lee Hsien Loong	Prime Minister	Working visit.
May 2, 2007	May 5, 2007	Lee Hsien Loong	Prime Minister	Working visit.
April 12, 2010	April 13, 2010	Lee Hsien Loong	Prime Minister	Attended the Nuclear Security Summit.
October 10, 2011	October 13, 2011	Lee Hsien Loong	Prime Minister	Attended the Asia-Pacific Economic Cooperation Summit at Honolulu and Kapolei, Hawaii.
April 2, 2013	April 3, 2013	Lee Hsien Loong	Prime Minister	Working visit.
February 16, 2016	February 18, 2016	Lee Hsien Loong	Prime Minister	Attended the ASEAN Leaders Summit at Sunnylands, California
March 31, 2016	April 1, 2016	Lee Hsien Loong	Prime Minister	Attended the Nuclear Security Summit.
August 2, 2016	August 2, 2016	Lee Hsien Loong	Prime Minister	State visit.
October 23, 2017	October 23, 2017	Lee Hsien Loong	Prime Minister	Official Working Visit.
March 29, 2022	March 29, 2022	Lee Hsien Loong	Prime Minister	Working Visit.
May 12, 2022	May 13, 2022	Lee Hsien Loong	Prime Minister	Attended the U.S.-ASEAN Summit.
November 12, 2023	November 17, 2023	Lee Hsien Loong	Prime Minister	Attended the APEC Leaders' Summit at San Francisco, California.

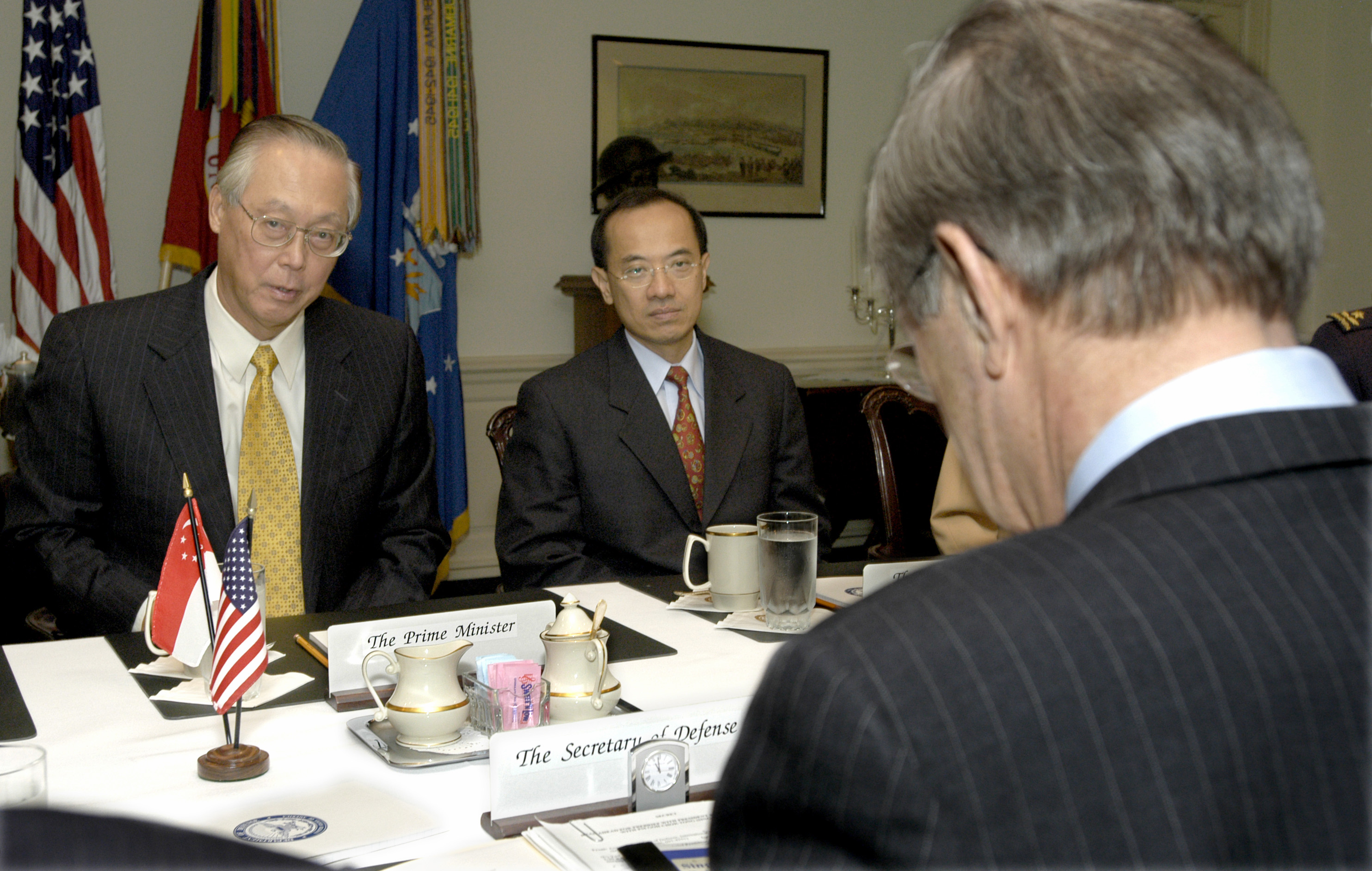

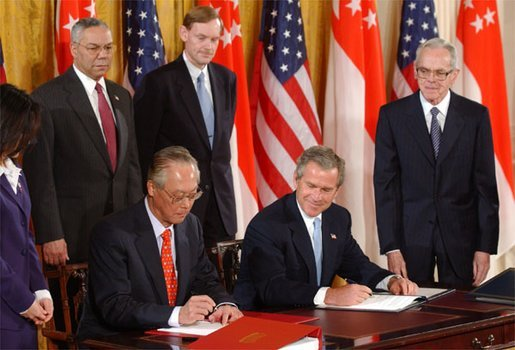

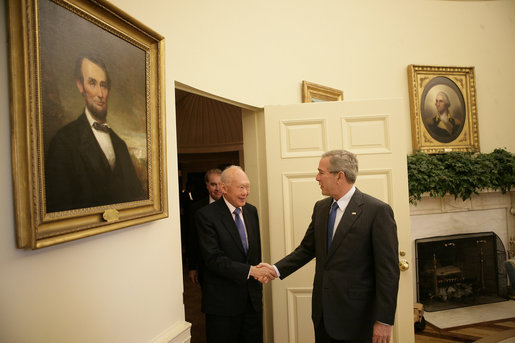

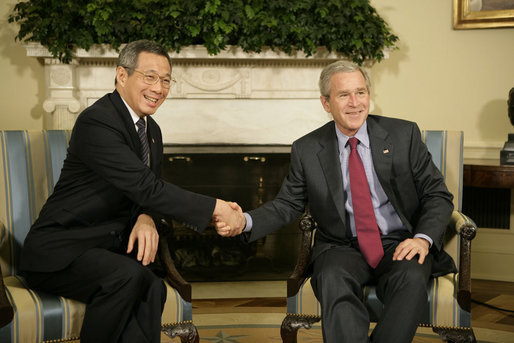

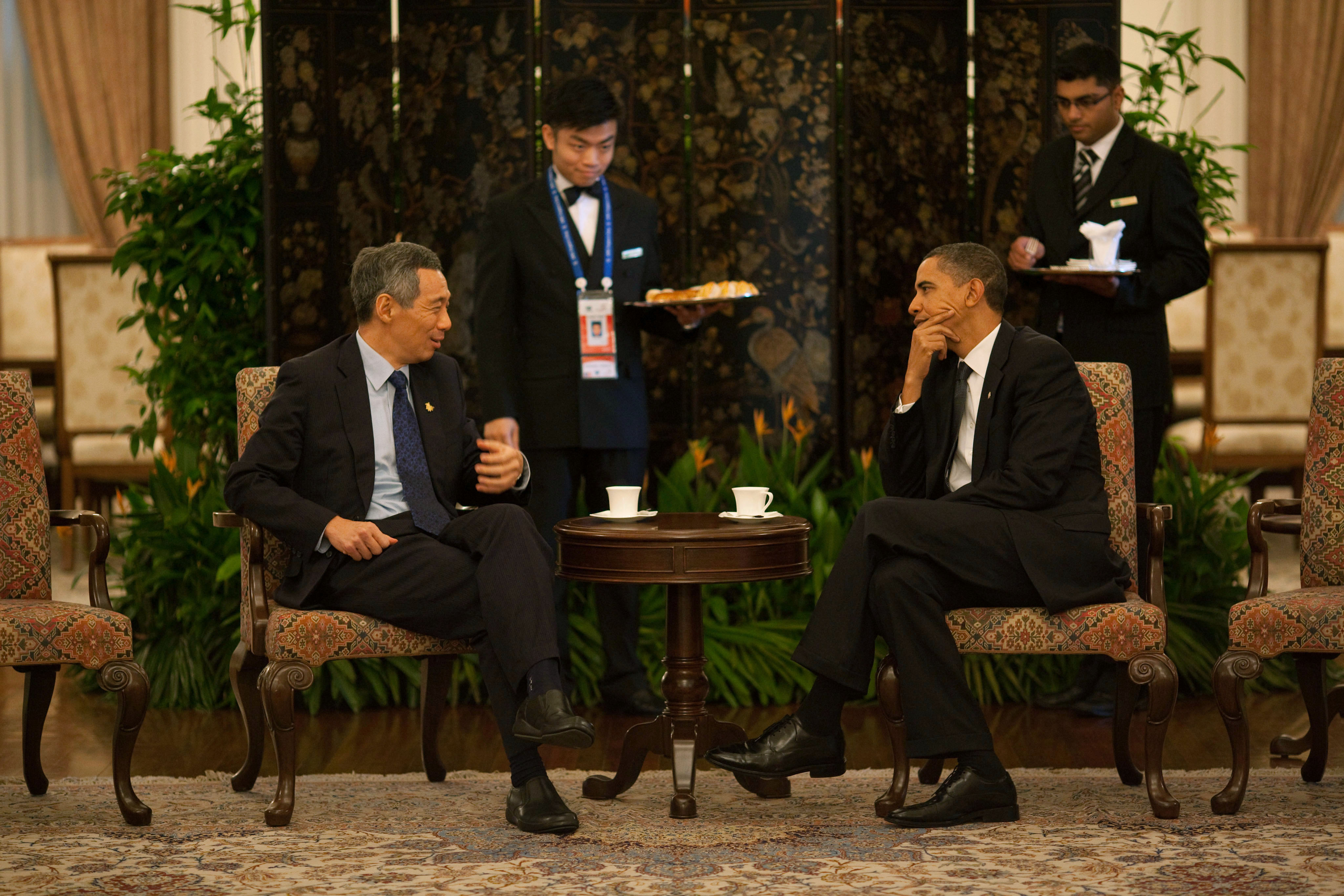

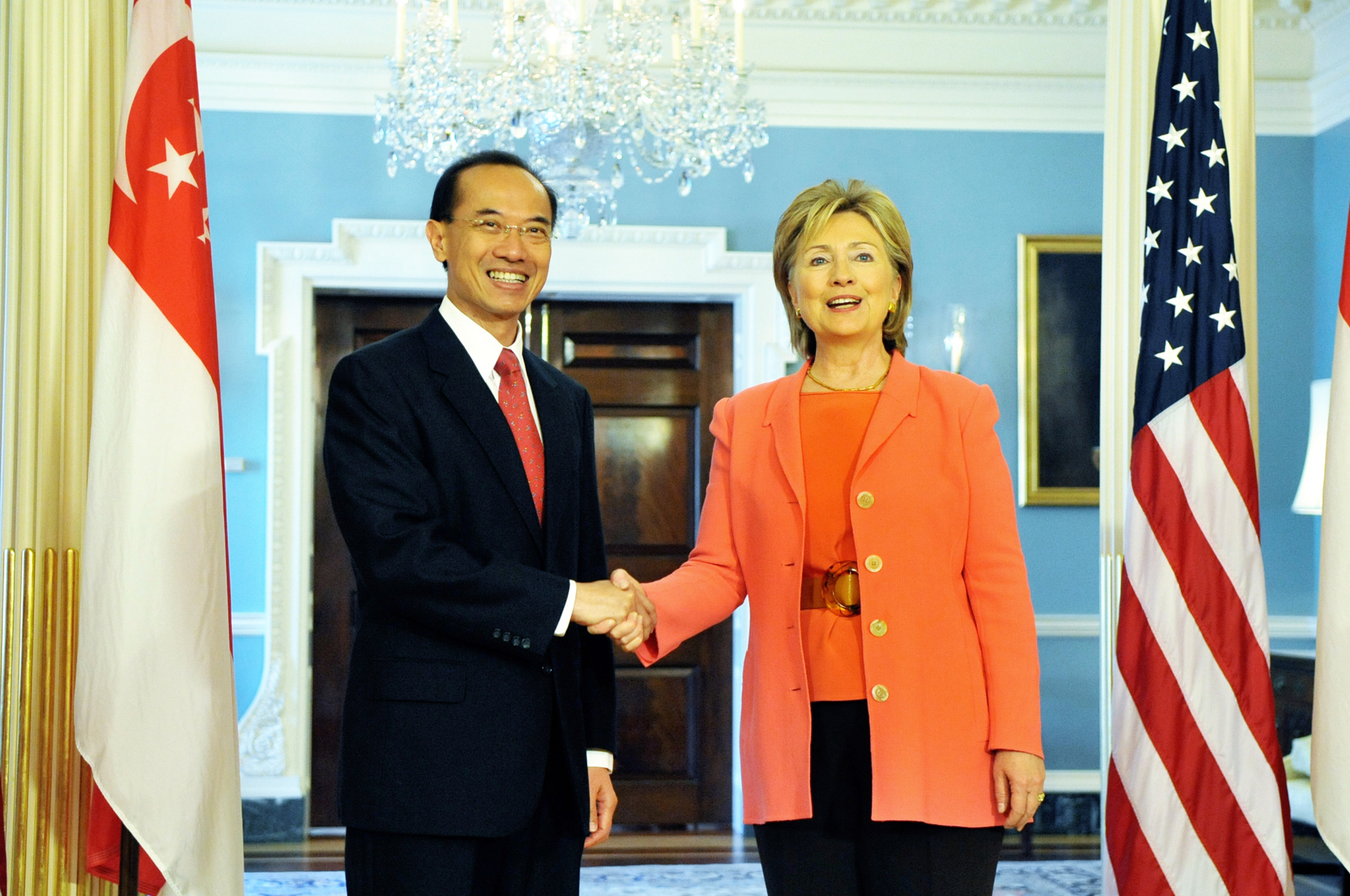

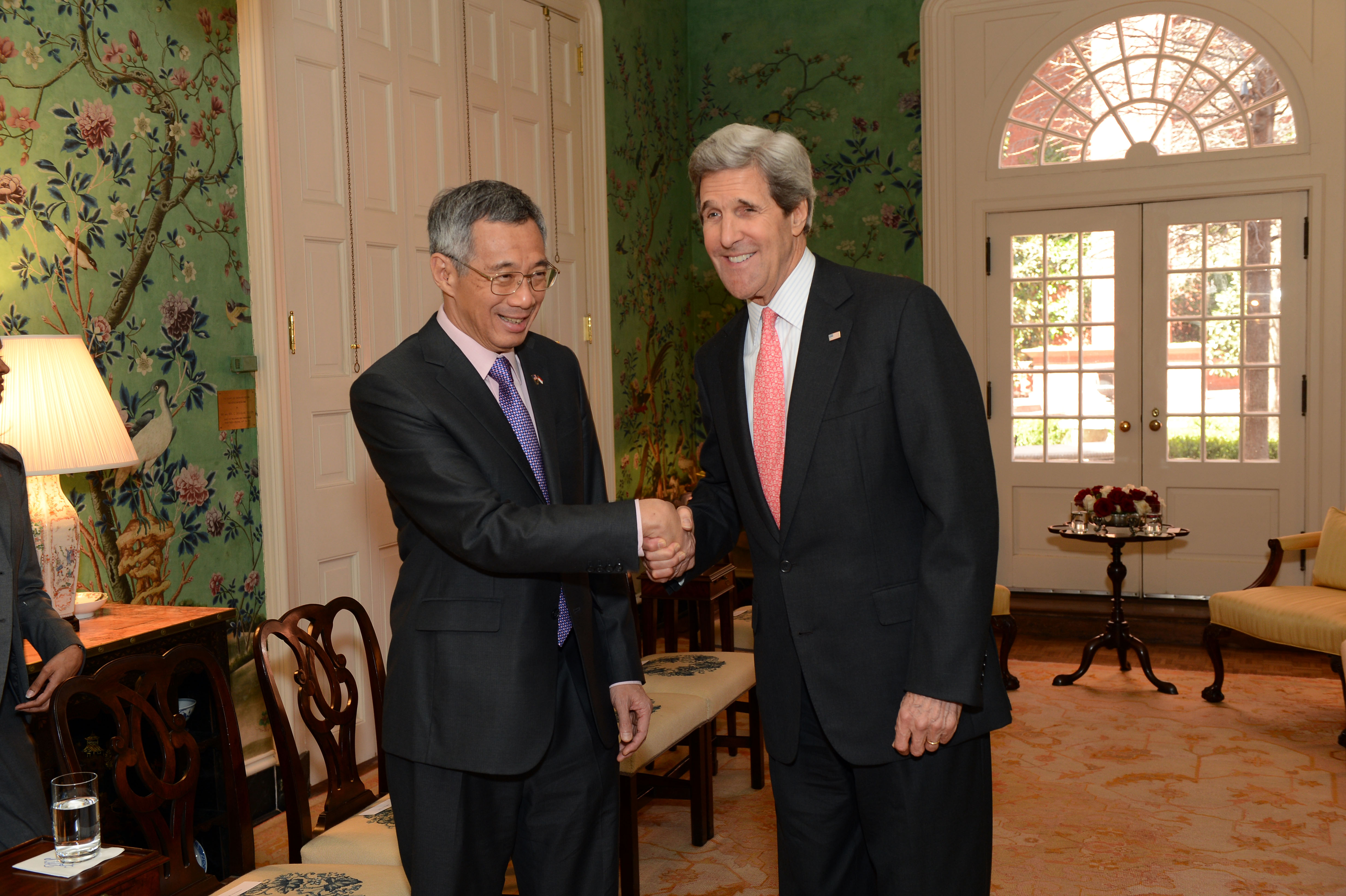

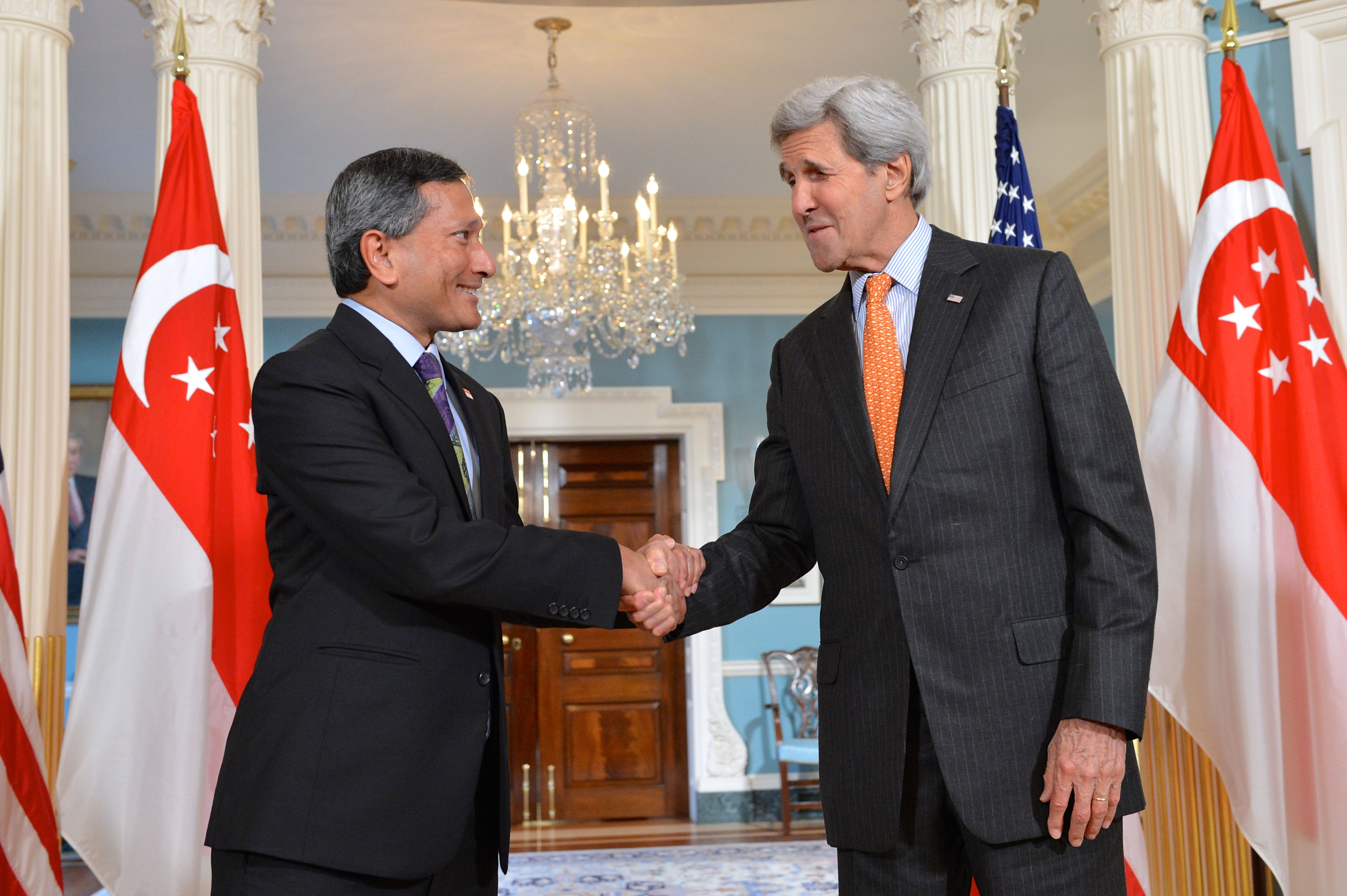

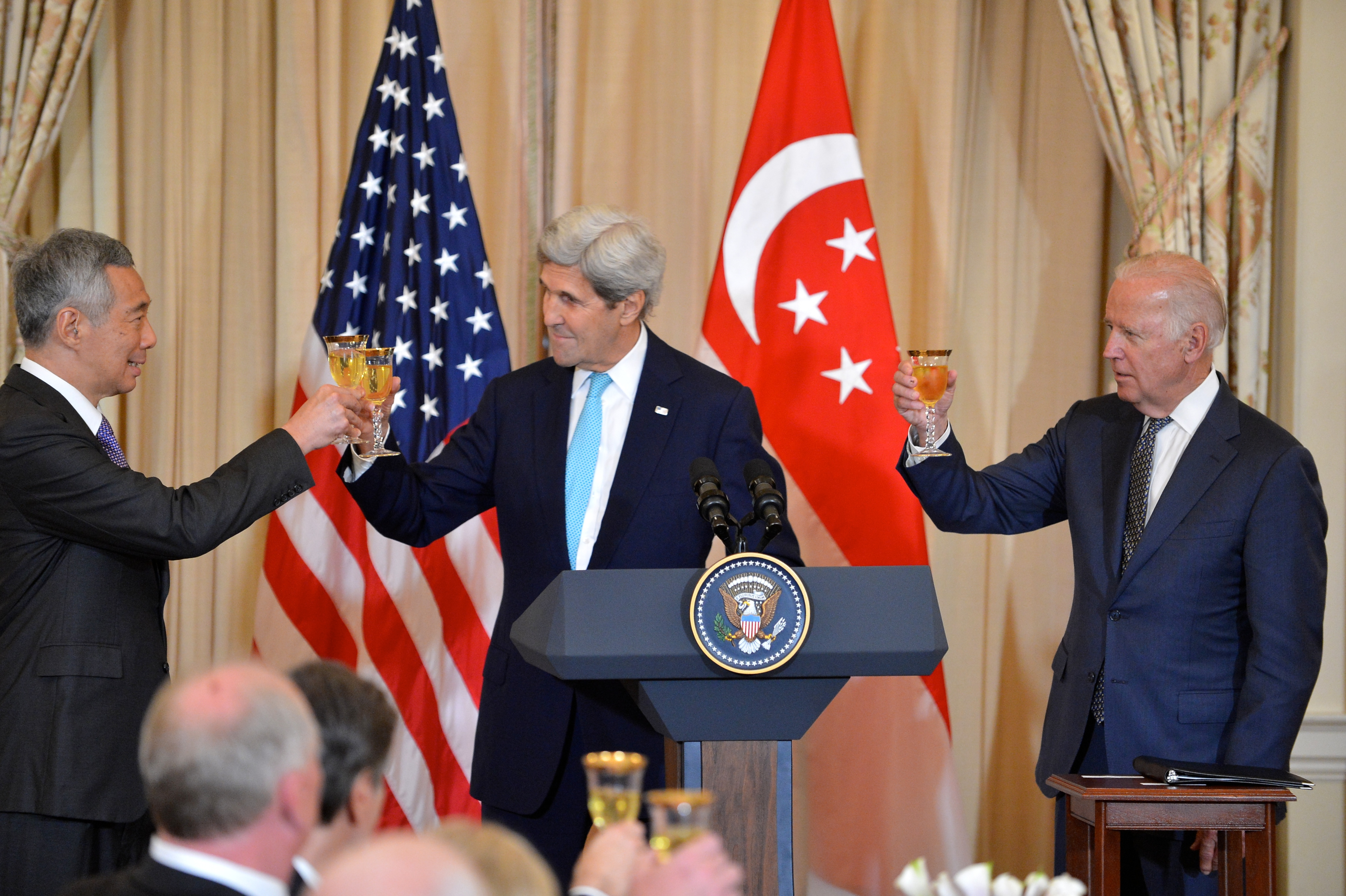

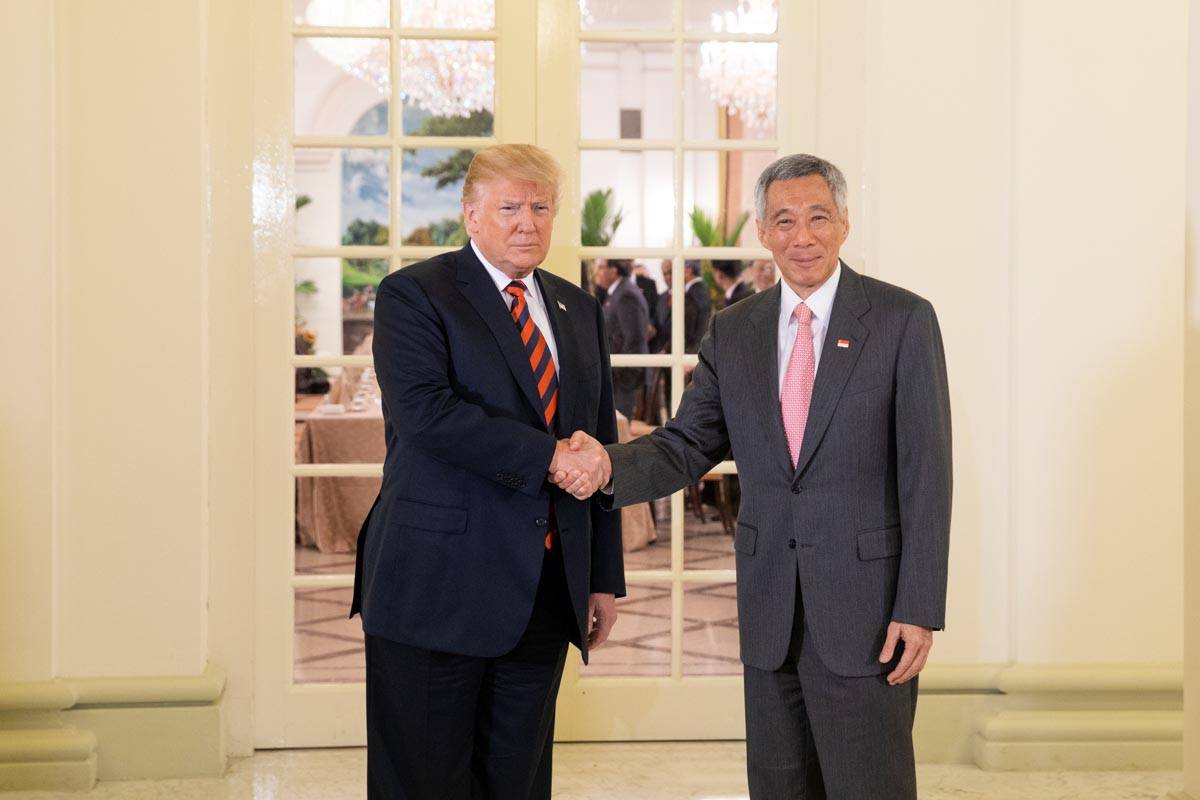

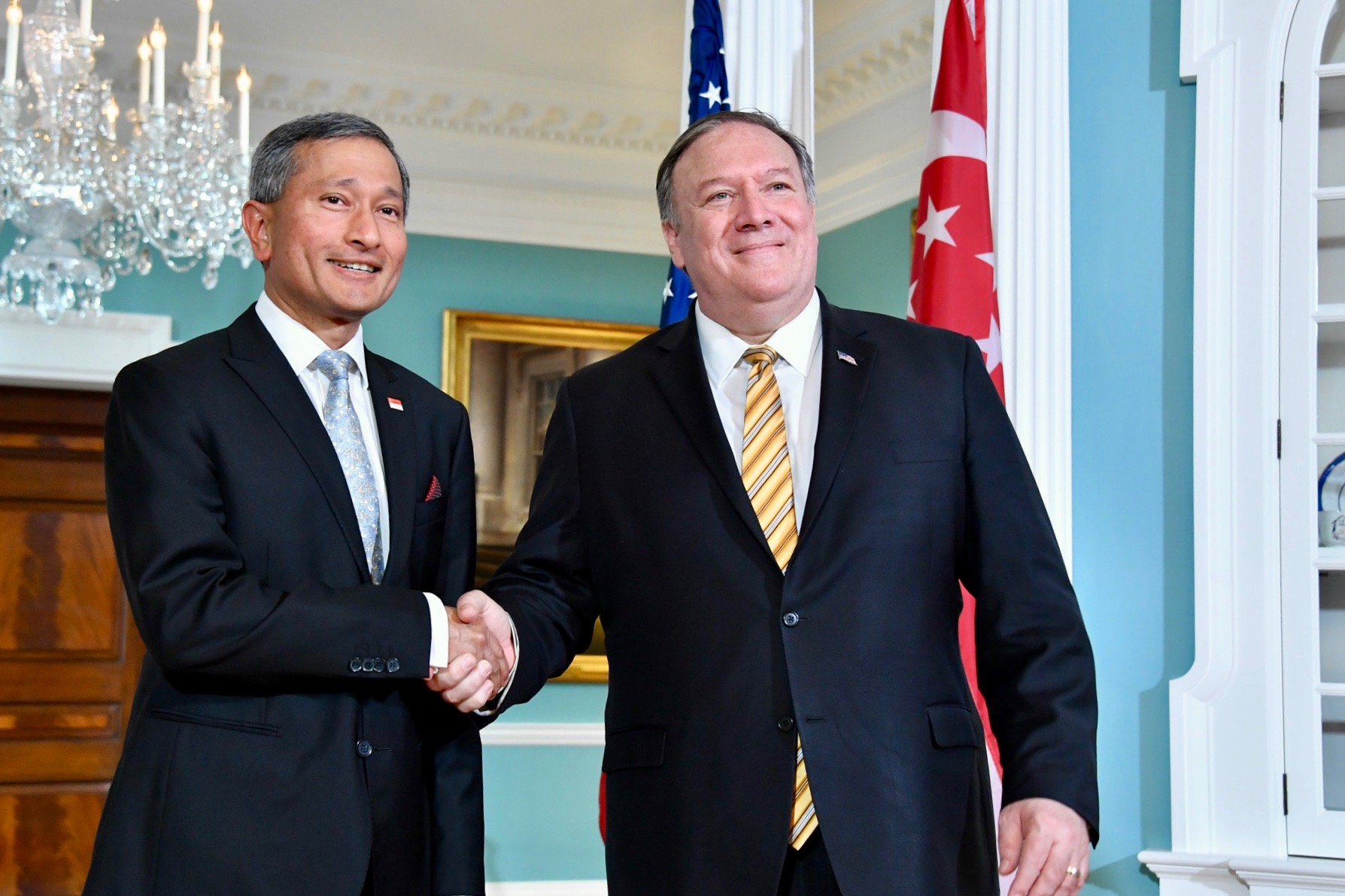

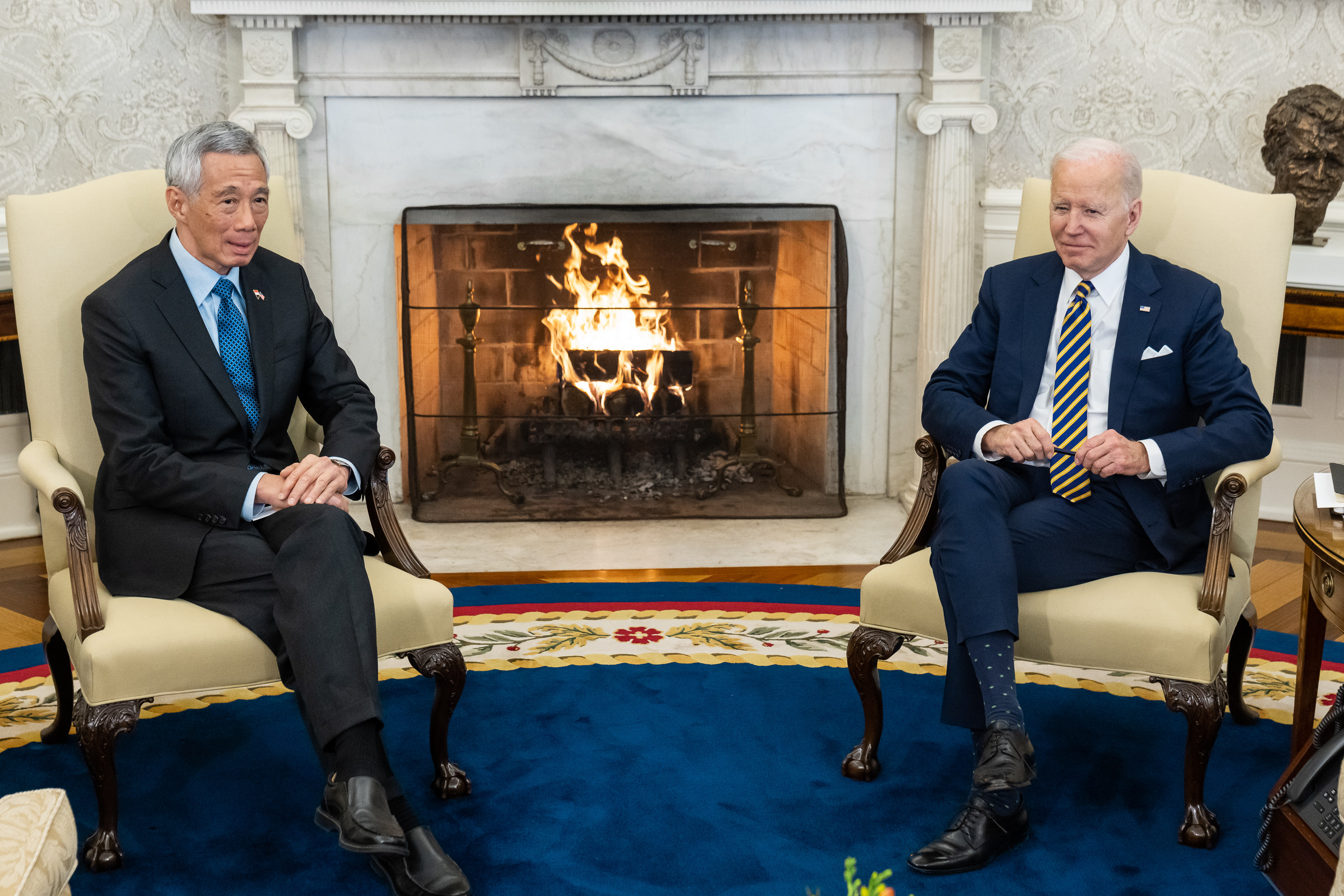

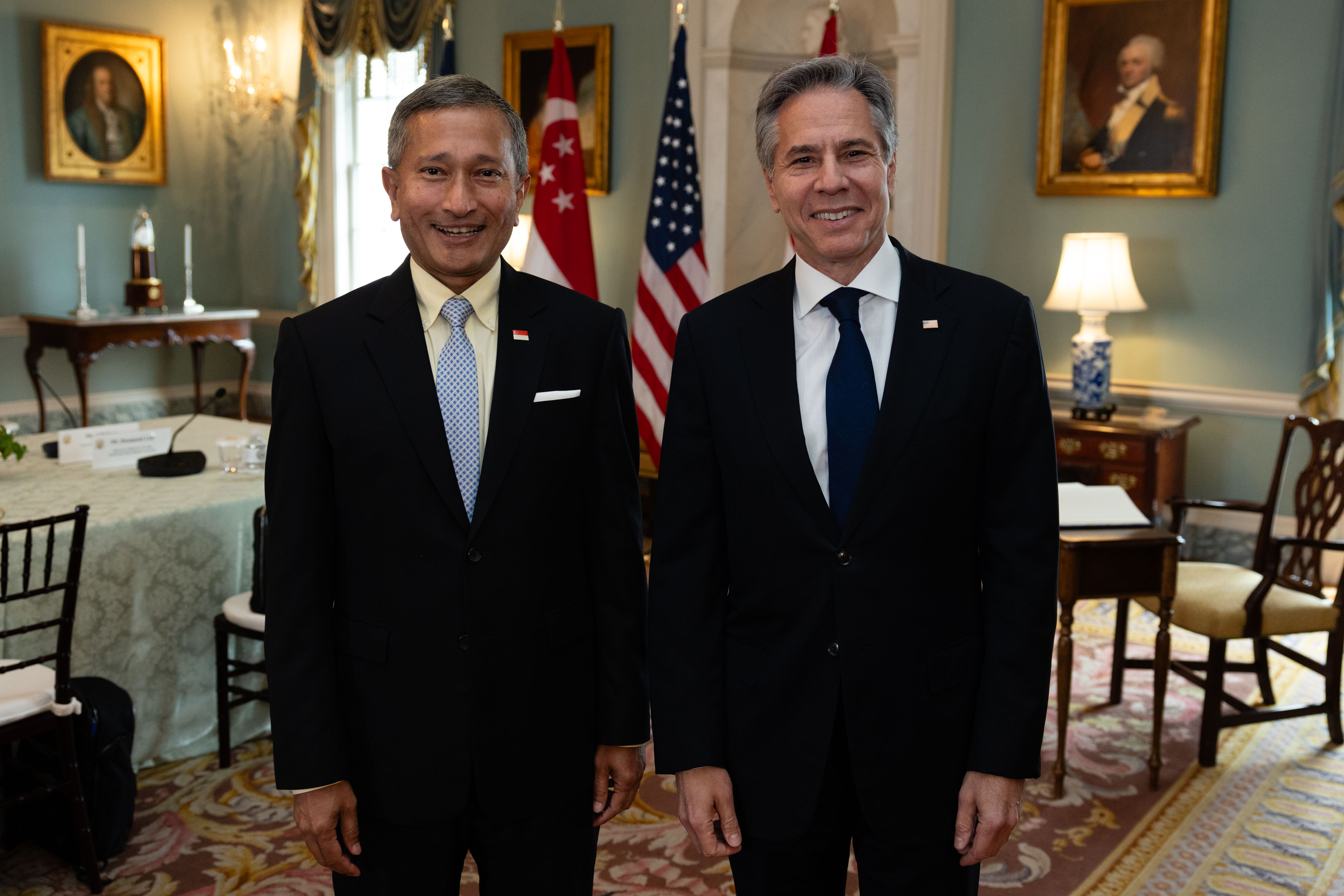

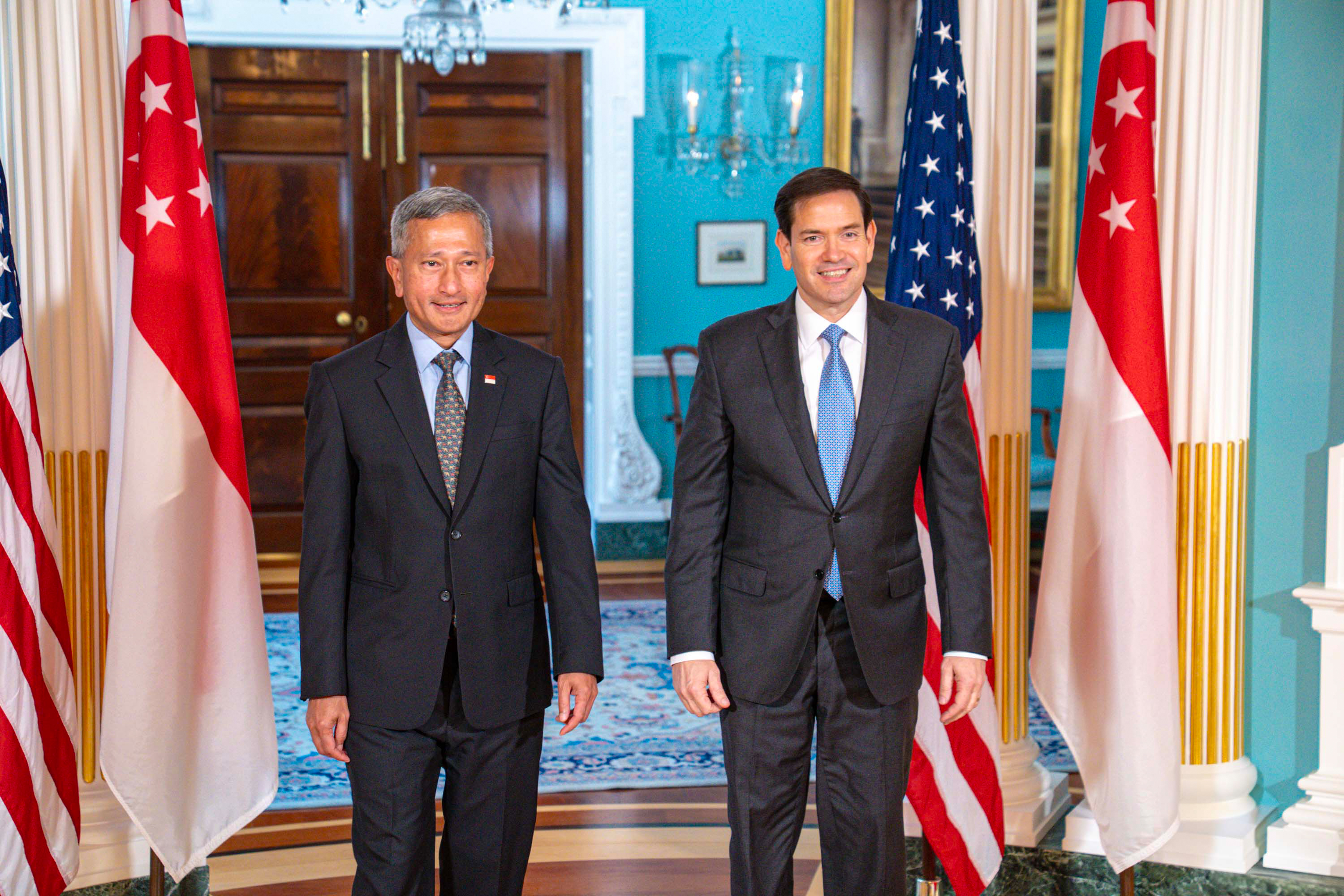

== Sri Lanka ==
Table of Trips
Start	End	Guest	Title	Reason
December 6, 1954	December 12, 1954	John Kotelawala	Prime Minister	Official visit. Afterwards visited Akron, Los Angeles, San Francisco, and Honolulu, Hawaii.
October 19, 1971	October 19, 1971	Sirimavo Bandaranaike	Prime Minister	Private visit to Washington, D.C. after attending session of the UN General Assembly.
April 10, 1983	April 14, 1983	Ranasinghe Premadasa	Prime Minister	Private visit. Met with President Reagan April 13.
June 17, 1984	June 20, 1984	Junius Richard Jayawardene	President	State visit. In U.S. June 16–23; visited Williamsburg, Santa Fe, Niagara Falls, and New York City.
July 29, 2002	July 25, 2002	Ranil Wickremasinghe	Prime Minister	Working visit.
November 2, 2003	November 2, 2003	Ranil Wickremasinghe	Prime Minister	Working visit.

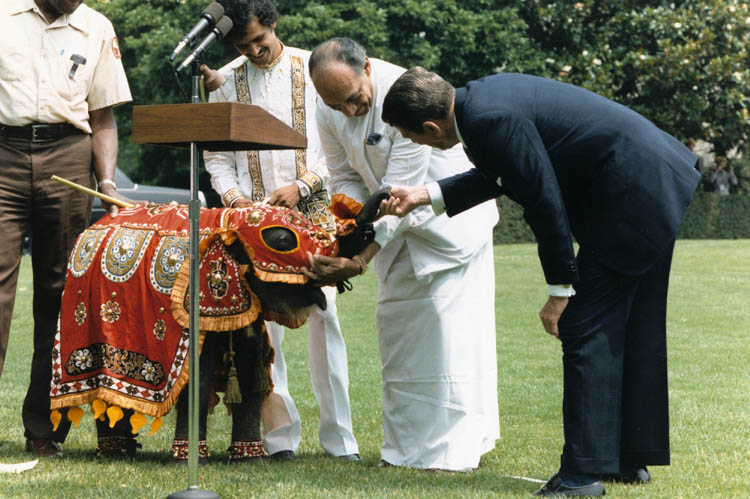

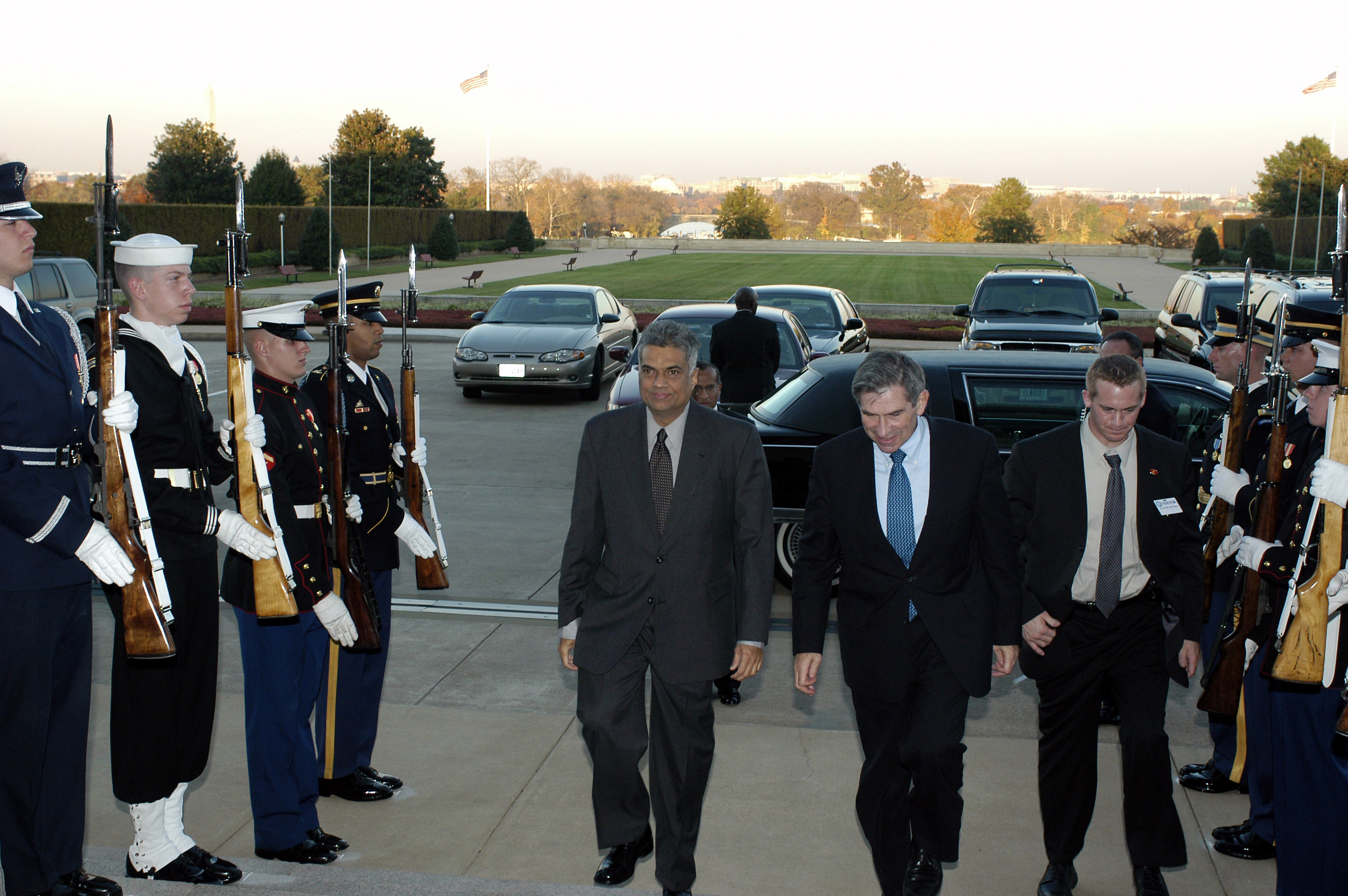

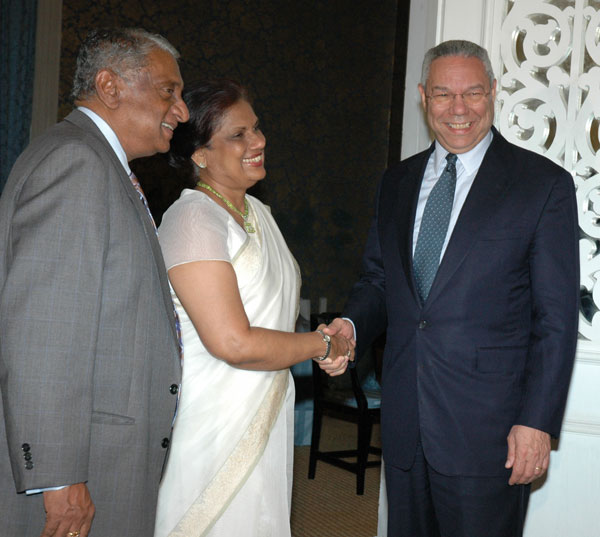

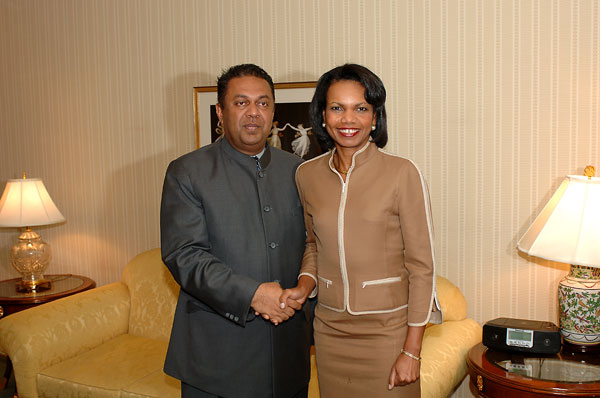

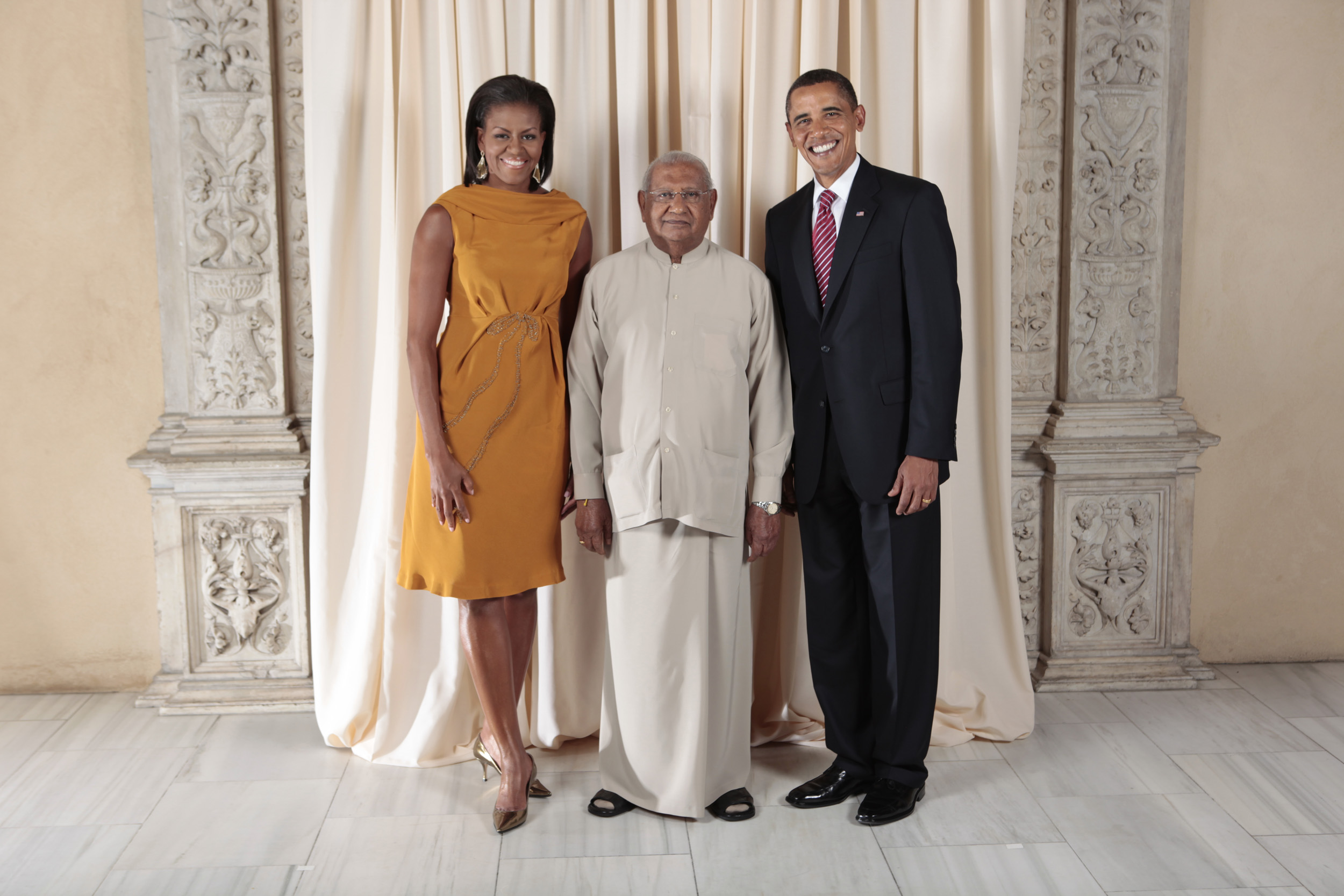

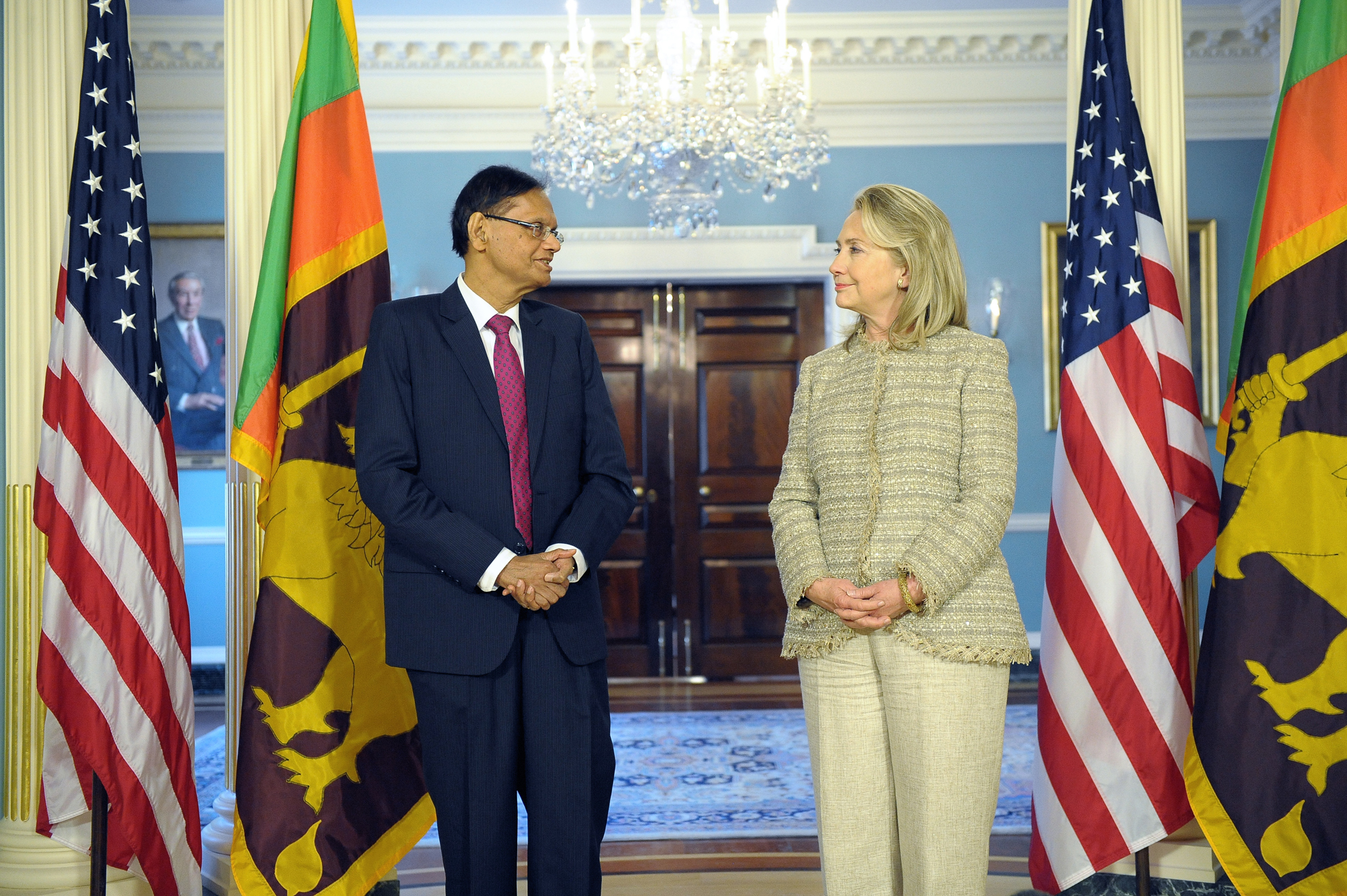

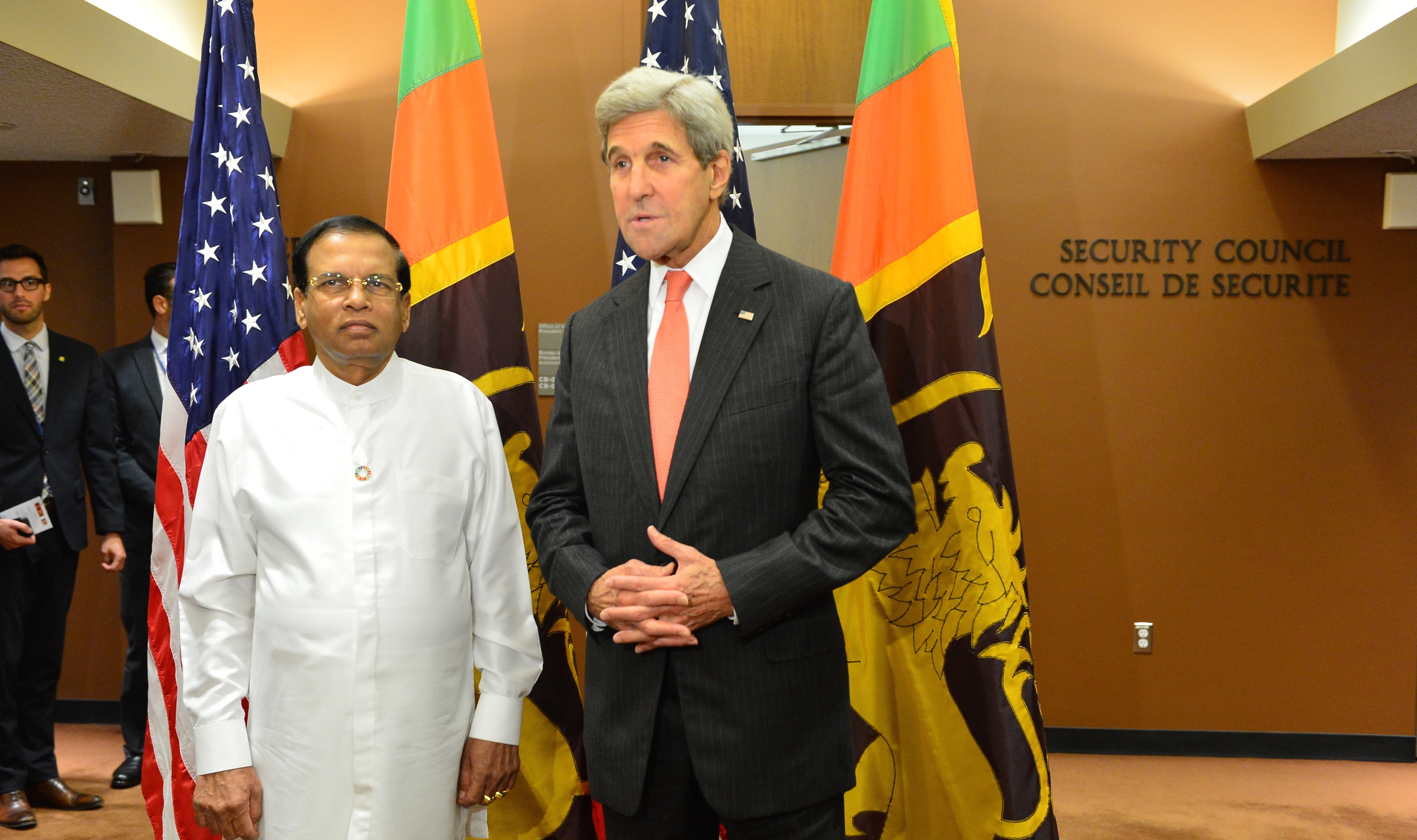

== Syria ==
Table of Trips
Start	End	Guest	Title	Reason
April 25, 1945	June 26, 1945	Fares al-Khoury	Prime Minister	Led Syrian delegation to the United Nations Conference in San Francisco.
November 8, 2025	November 10, 2025	Ahmed al-Sharaa	President	Official Visit.

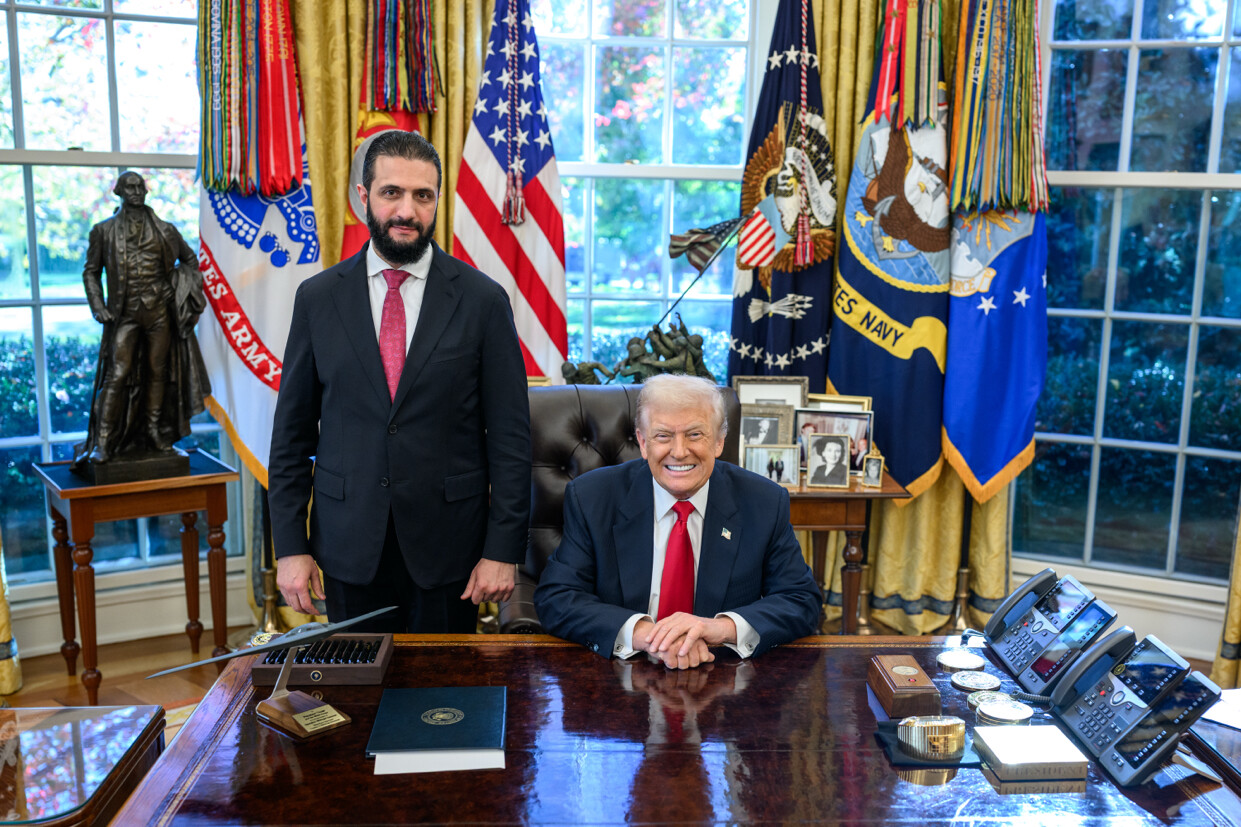

== Tajikistan ==
Table of Trips
Start	End	Guest	Title	Reason
April 23, 1999	April 25, 1999	Emomali Rahmonov	President	Attended NATO's 50th Anniversary Summit
December 8, 2002	December 10, 2002	Emomali Rahmonov	President	Working visit.
September 21, 2023	September 21, 2023	Emomali Rahmonov	President	Participated in C5+1 Presidential Summit Meeting with President Biden at the UN General Assembly in New York City.
November 5, 2025	November 6, 2025	Emomali Rahmonov	President	Participated in C5+1 Presidential Summit Meeting with President Trump at the White House.

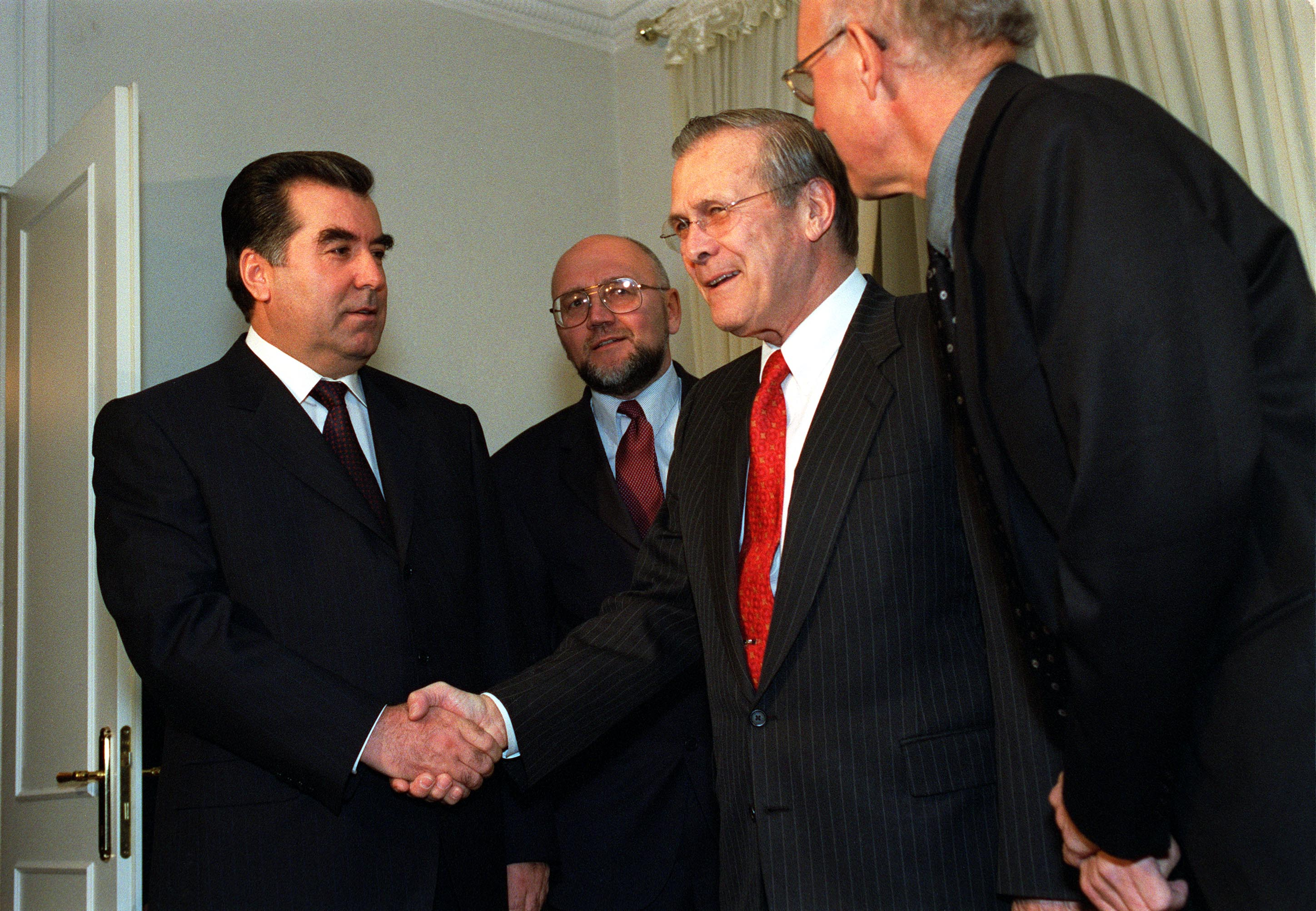

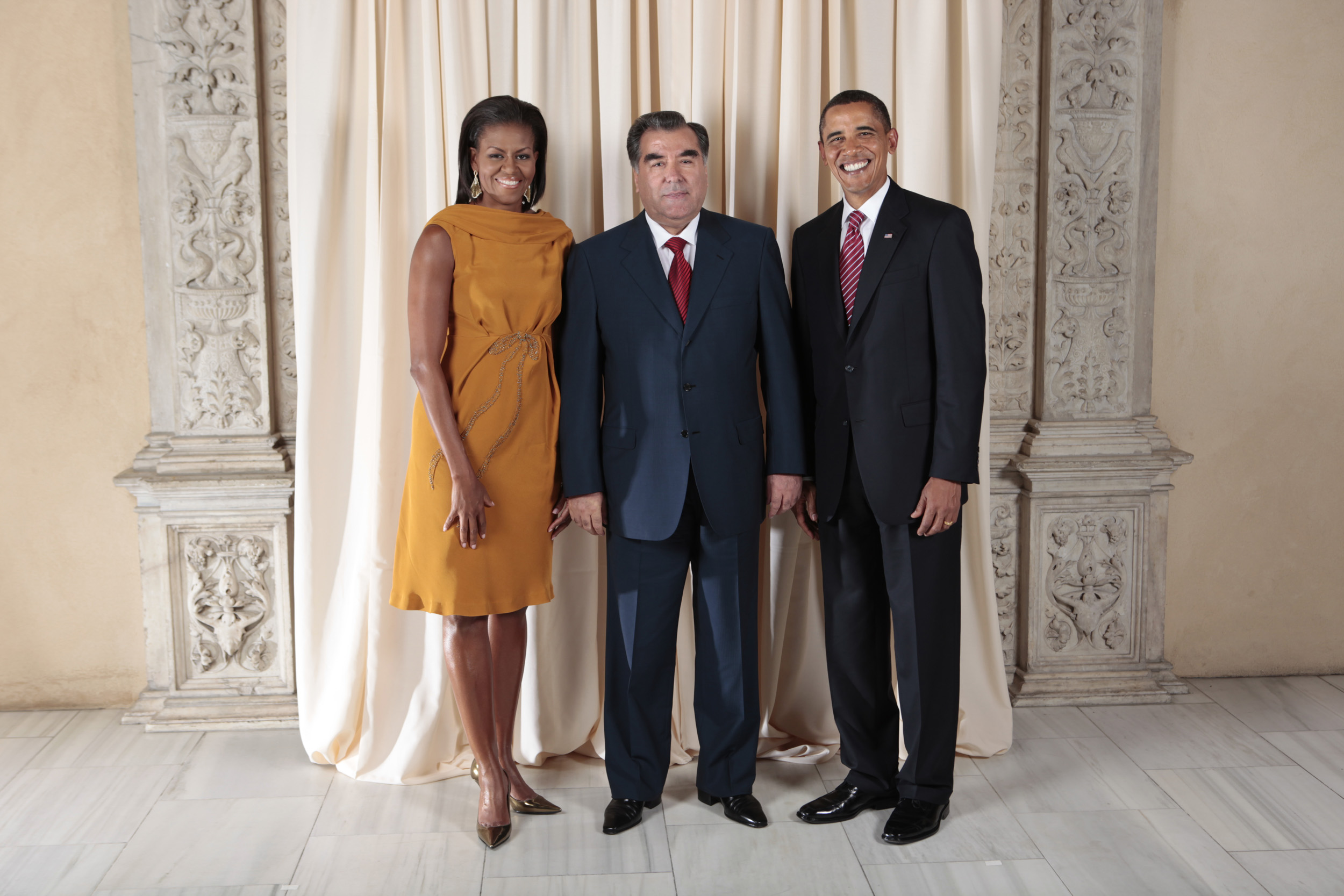

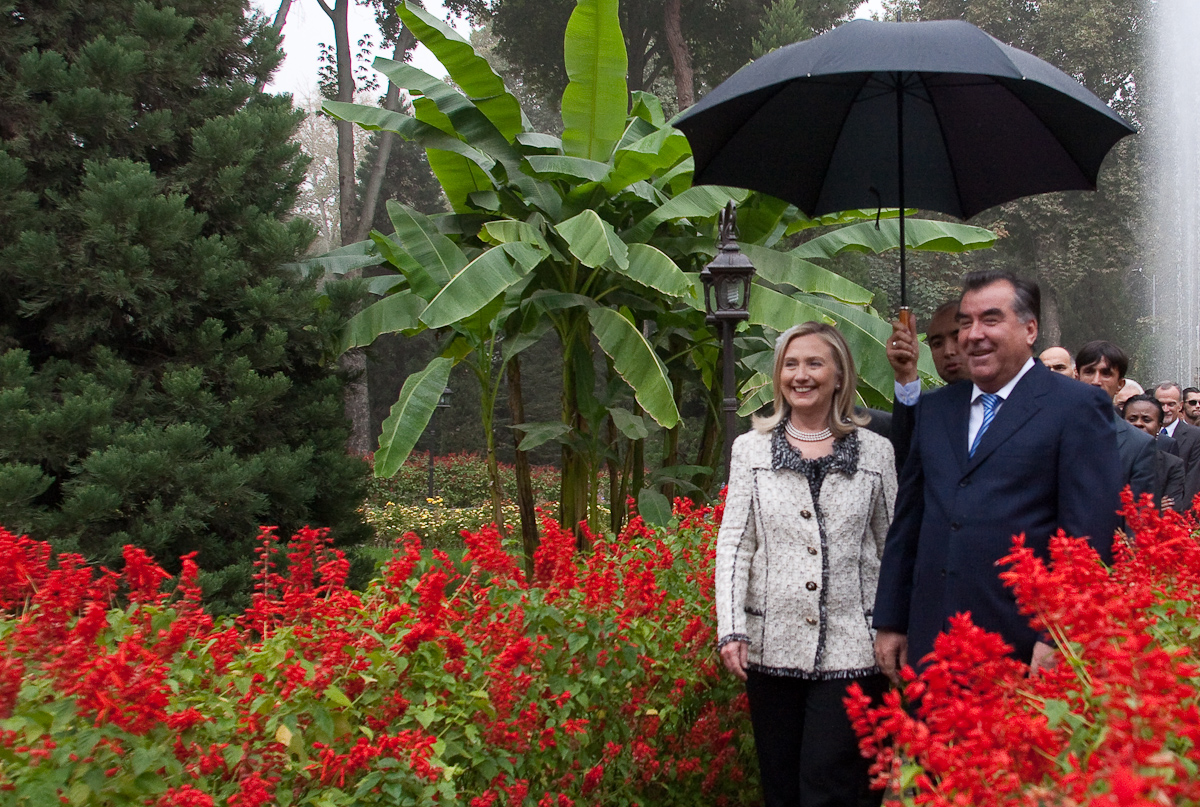

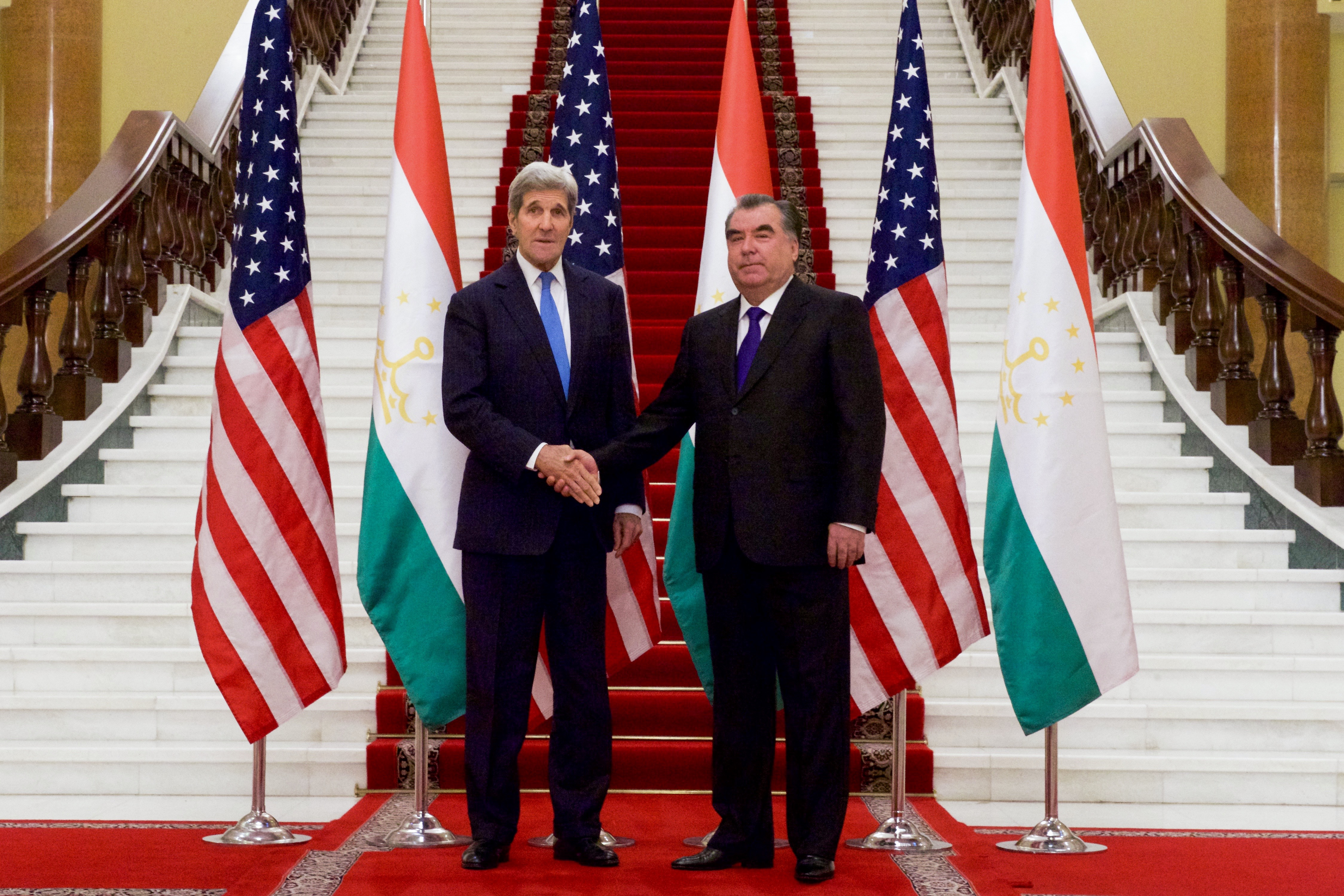

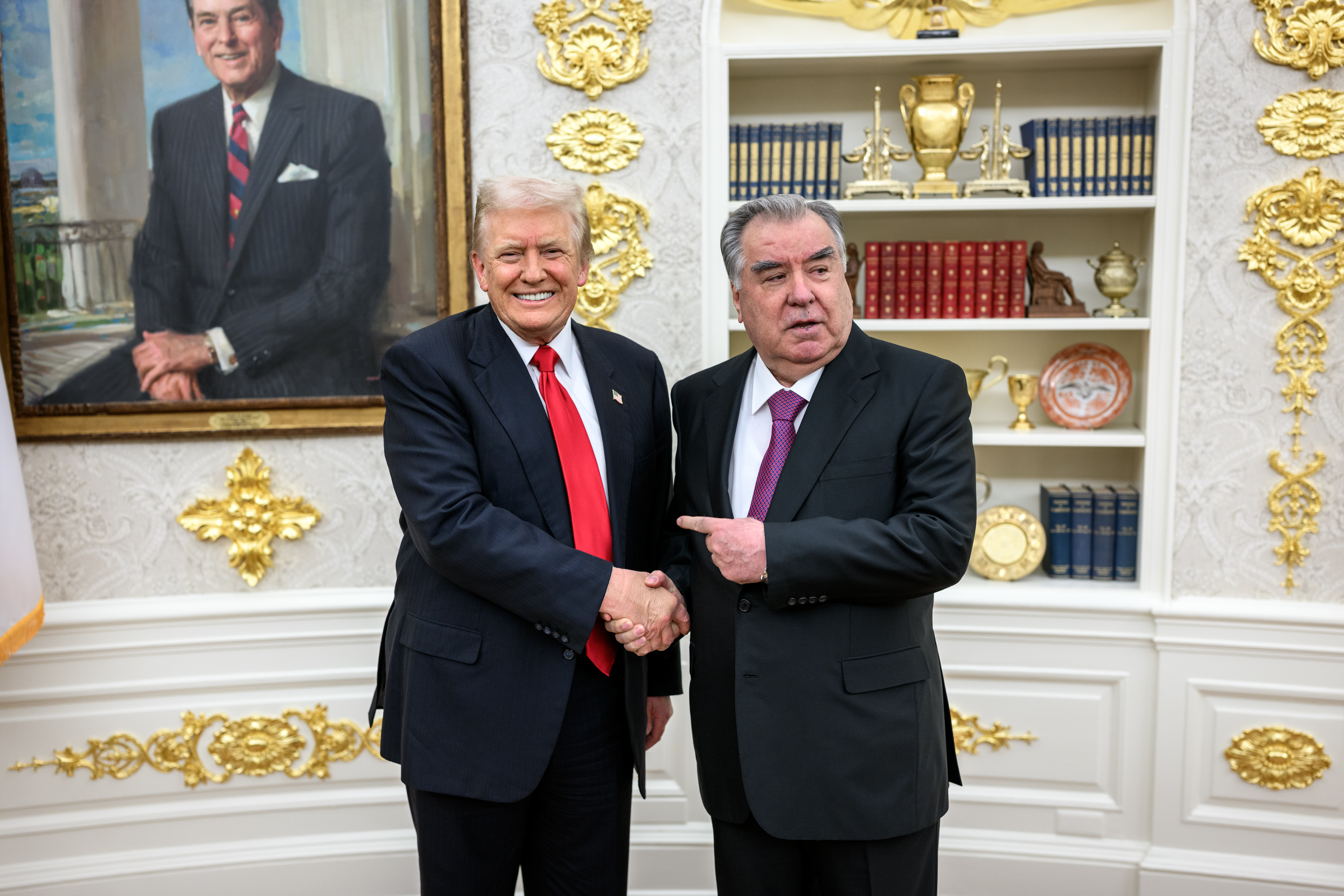

== Thailand ==
Table of Trips
Start	End	Guest	Title	Reason
April 28, 1931	May 1, 1931	Prajadhipok	King	Private visit to obtain medical treatment. In U.S. April 19 – July 28. Stayed at Ophir Hall, Purchase visited New York City and New London.
May 2, 1955	May 6, 1955	Phibun	Prime Minister	Official visit. In U.S. April 23 – May 1, visiting San Francisco, Detroit, Albany, New York City, West Point and Hyde Park, and Morrisville
June 28, 1960	July 2, 1960	Bhumibol Adulyadej	King	State visit. In U.S. June 14 – July 14, visited Honolulu, Hawaii, Los Angeles, Pittsburgh, Williamsburg, New York City, Boston, Knoxville, Colorado Springs, Yellowstone Park, and San Francisco.
June 27, 1967	June 29, 1967	Bhumibol Adulyadej	King	Official visit. In U.S. June 6–29; visited Honolulu, Hawaii, New York City, North Adams, Los Angeles, Tarrytown, and North Haven. Visited Canada June 20–24.
May 8, 1968	May 10, 1968	Thanom Kittikachorn	Prime Minister	Official visit. In U.S. May 2–13; visited Miami (private), Cape Kennedy, Lansing, and New York City. Private visit to Washington, D.C. and Los Angeles, May 11–13.
February 4, 1979	February 8, 1979	Kriangsak Chomanan	Prime Minister	Official visit. Afterwards visited New York City, Palm Springs, Los Angeles, and Honolulu, Hawaii. Departed February 16.
October 3, 1981	October 10, 1981	Prem Tinsulanonda	Prime Minister	Private visit. Met with President Reagan October 6.
April 12, 1984	April 14, 1984	Prem Tinsulanonda	Prime Minister	Official working visit. Private visit to New York City afterwards.
June 13, 1990	June 15, 1990	Chatichai Chunhawan	Prime Minister	Official working visit. Private visit to New York City afterwards.
December 15, 1991	December 17, 1991	Anand Panyarachun	Prime Minister	Official working visit. Later visited Los Angeles.
November 17, 1993	November 22, 1993	Chuan Leekpai	Prime Minister	Attended Asia-Pacific Economic Cooperation meeting in Seattle.
March 12, 1998	March 14, 1998	Chuan Leekpai	Prime Minister	Official Working Visit.
December 13, 2001	December 15, 2001	Thaksin Shinawatra	Prime Minister	Working Visit.
June 9, 2003	June 11, 2003	Thaksin Shinawatra	Prime Minister	Working Visit.
September 19, 2005	September 19, 2005	Thaksin Shinawatra	Prime Minister	Working Visit.
February 16, 2016	February 18, 2016	Prayut Chan-o-cha	Prime Minister	Attended the ASEAN Leaders Summit at Sunnylands, California
March 31, 2016	April 1, 2016	Prayut Chan-o-cha	Prime Minister	Attended the Nuclear Security Summit.
October 2, 2017	October 3, 2017	Prayut Chan-o-cha	Prime Minister	Official Working Visit.
May 12, 2022	May 13, 2022	Prayut Chan-o-cha	Prime Minister	Attended the U.S.-ASEAN Summit.
November 12, 2023	November 17, 2023	Srettha Thavisin	Prime Minister	Attended the APEC Leaders' Summit at San Francisco, California.

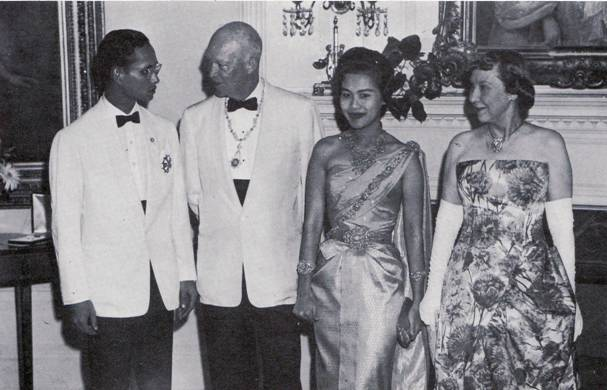

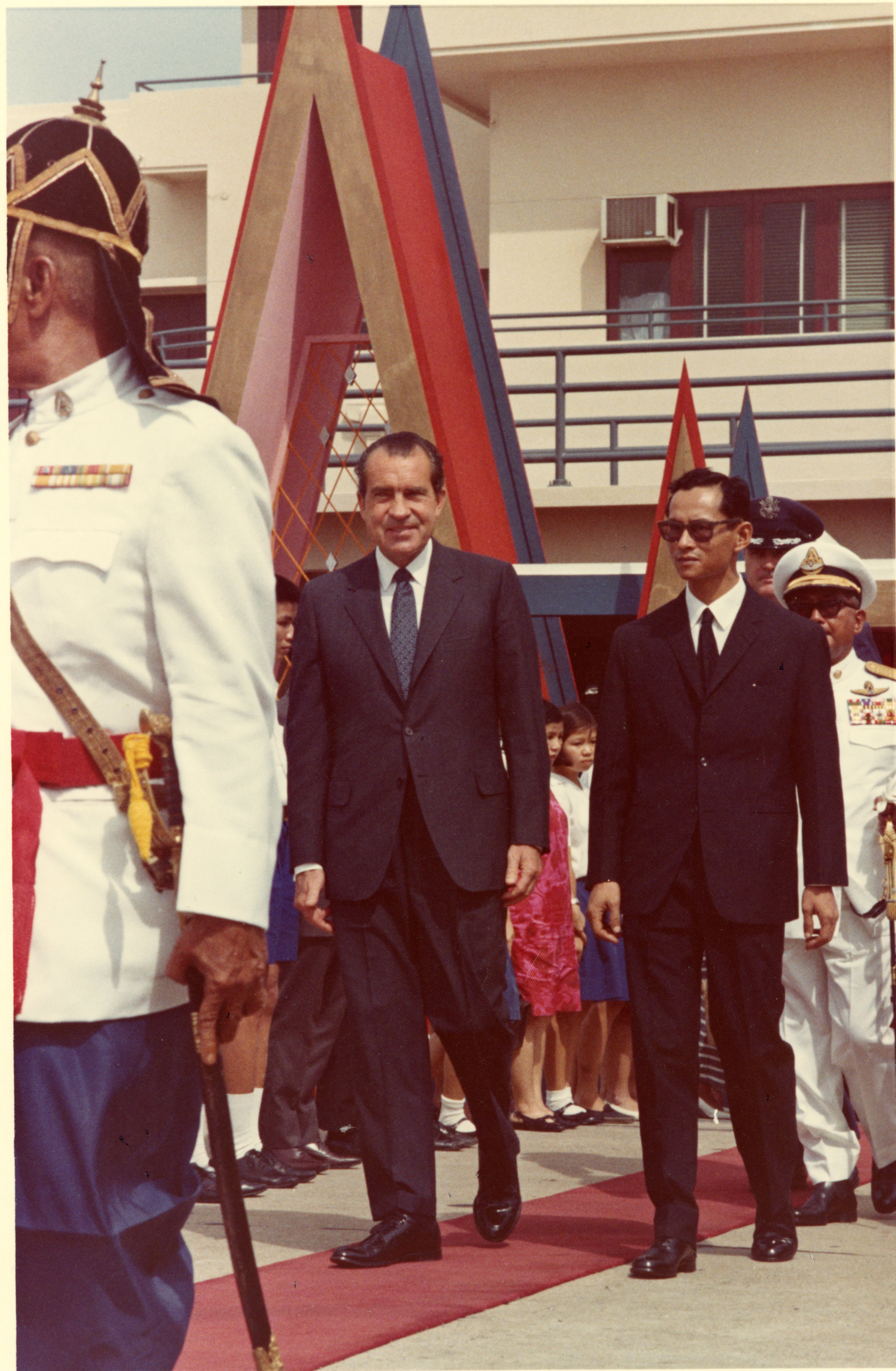

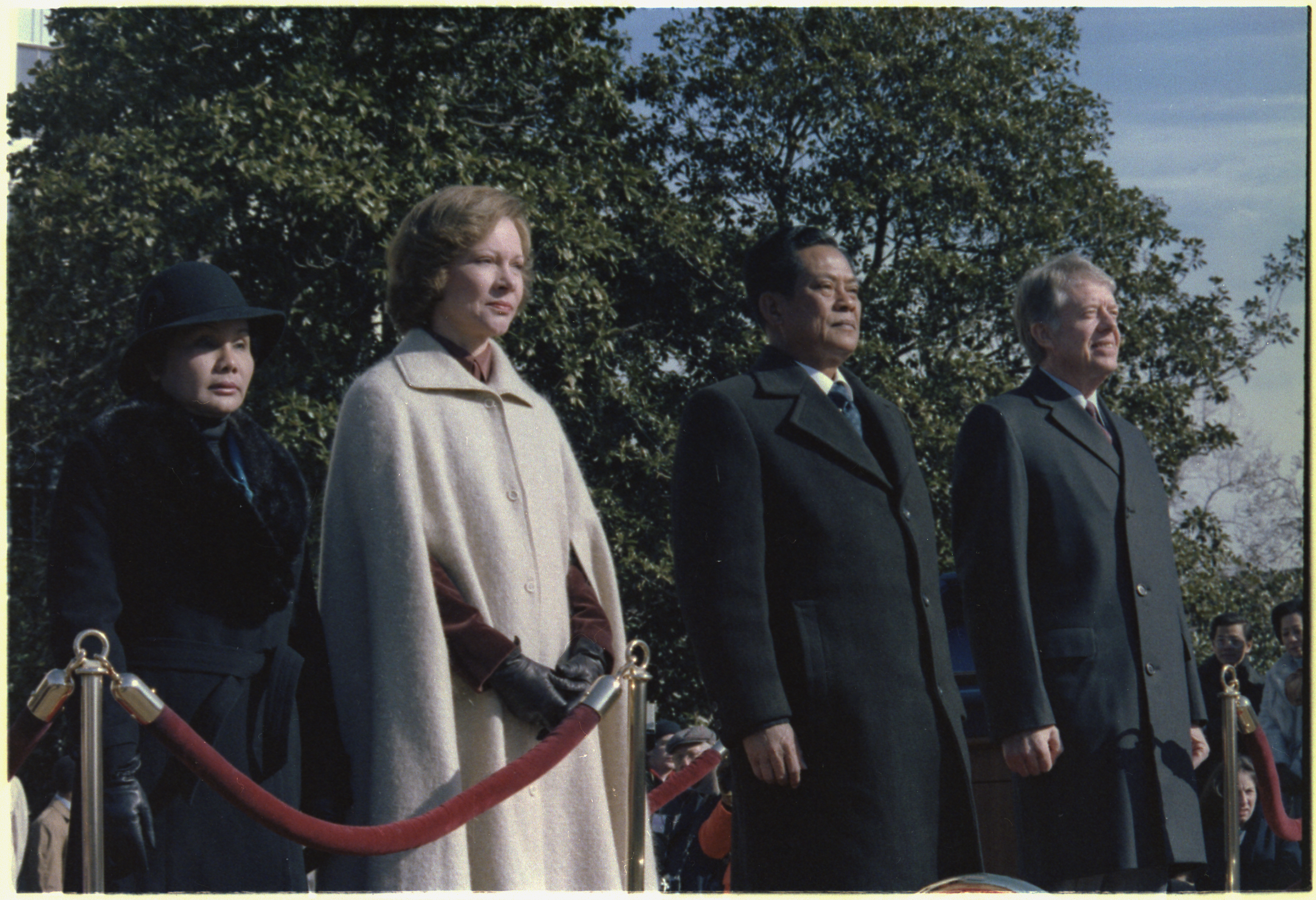

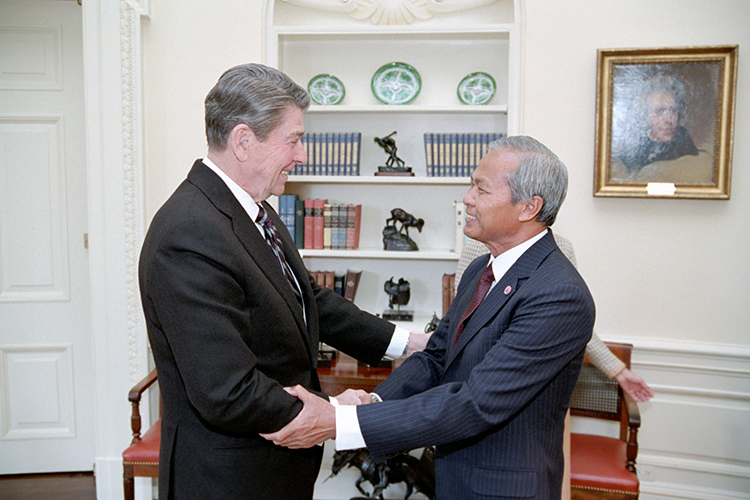

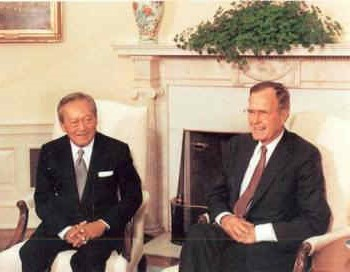

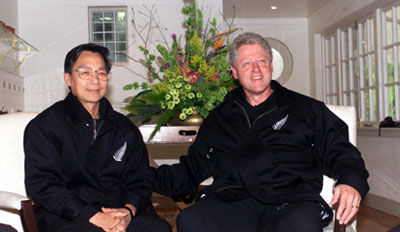

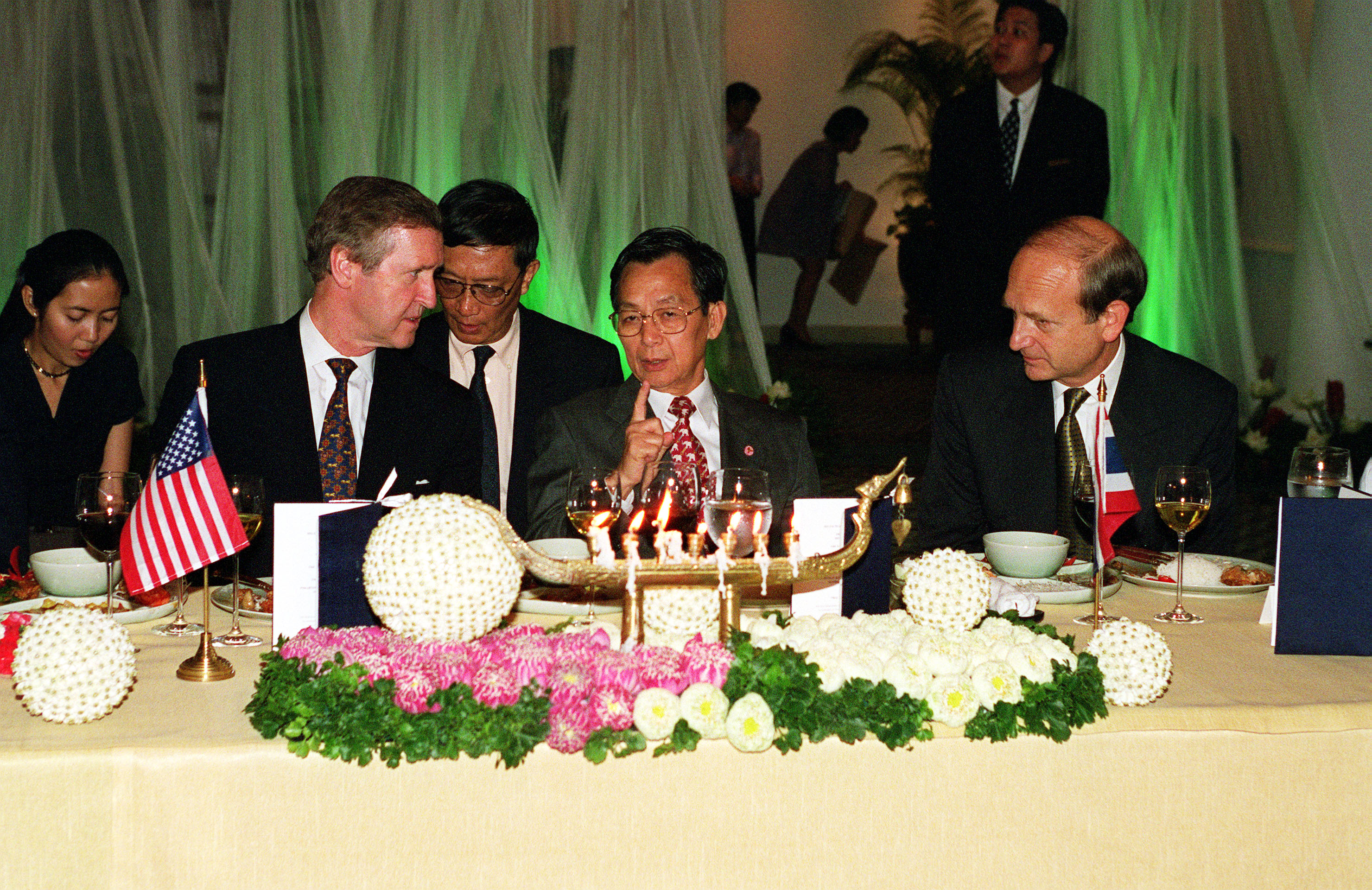

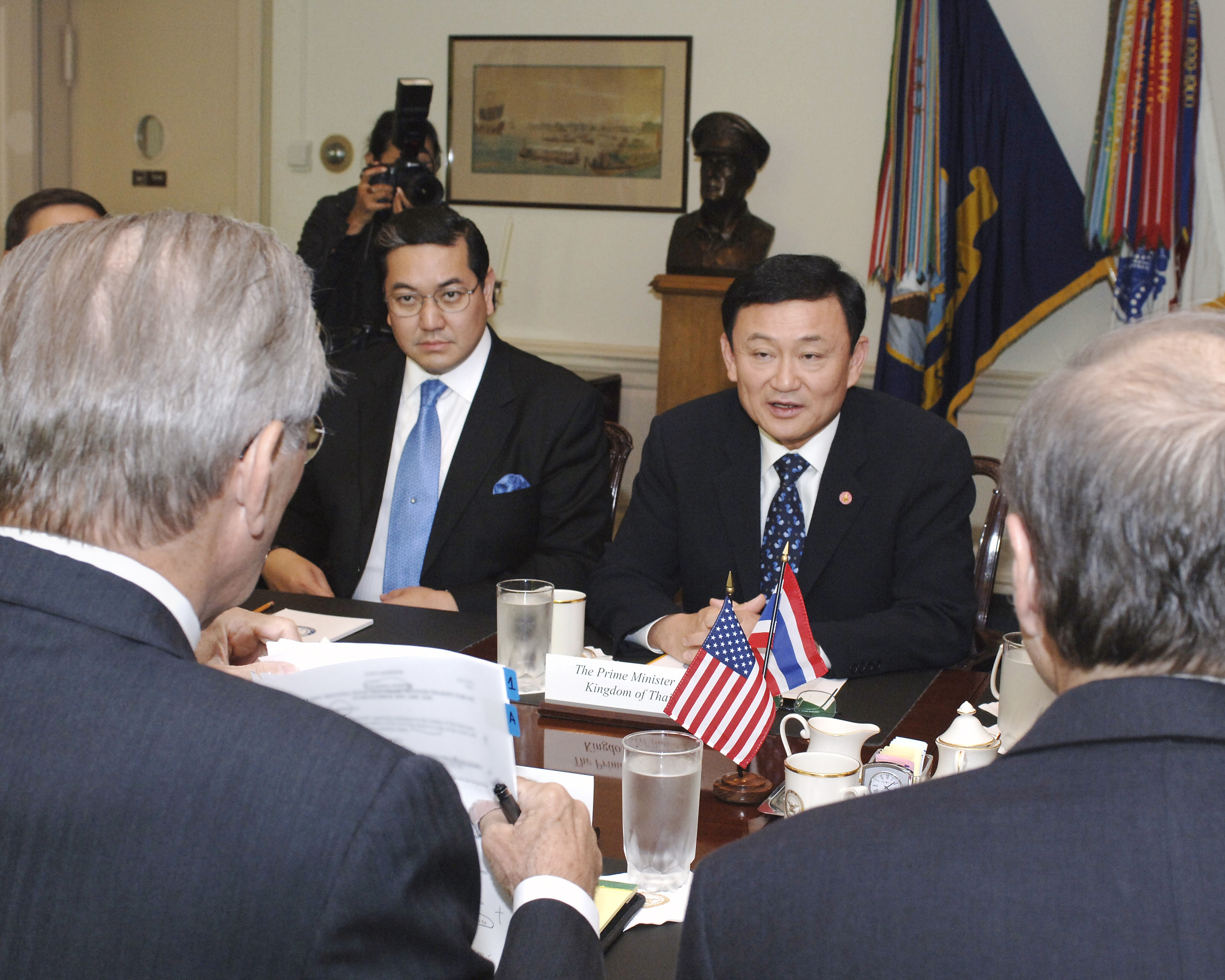

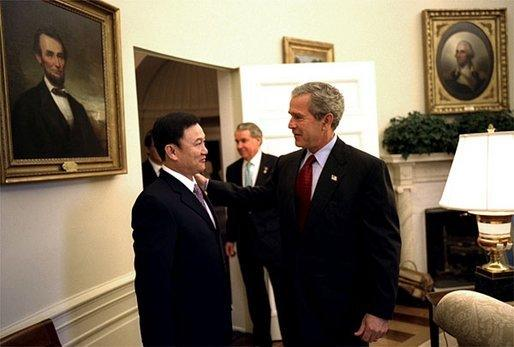

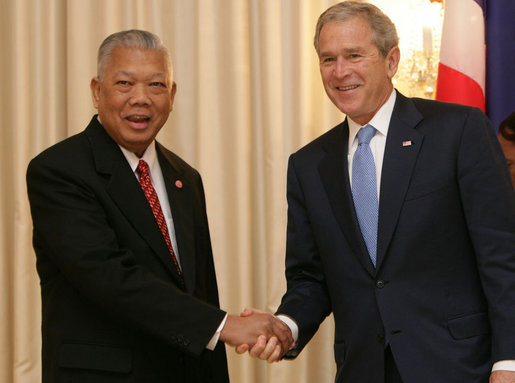

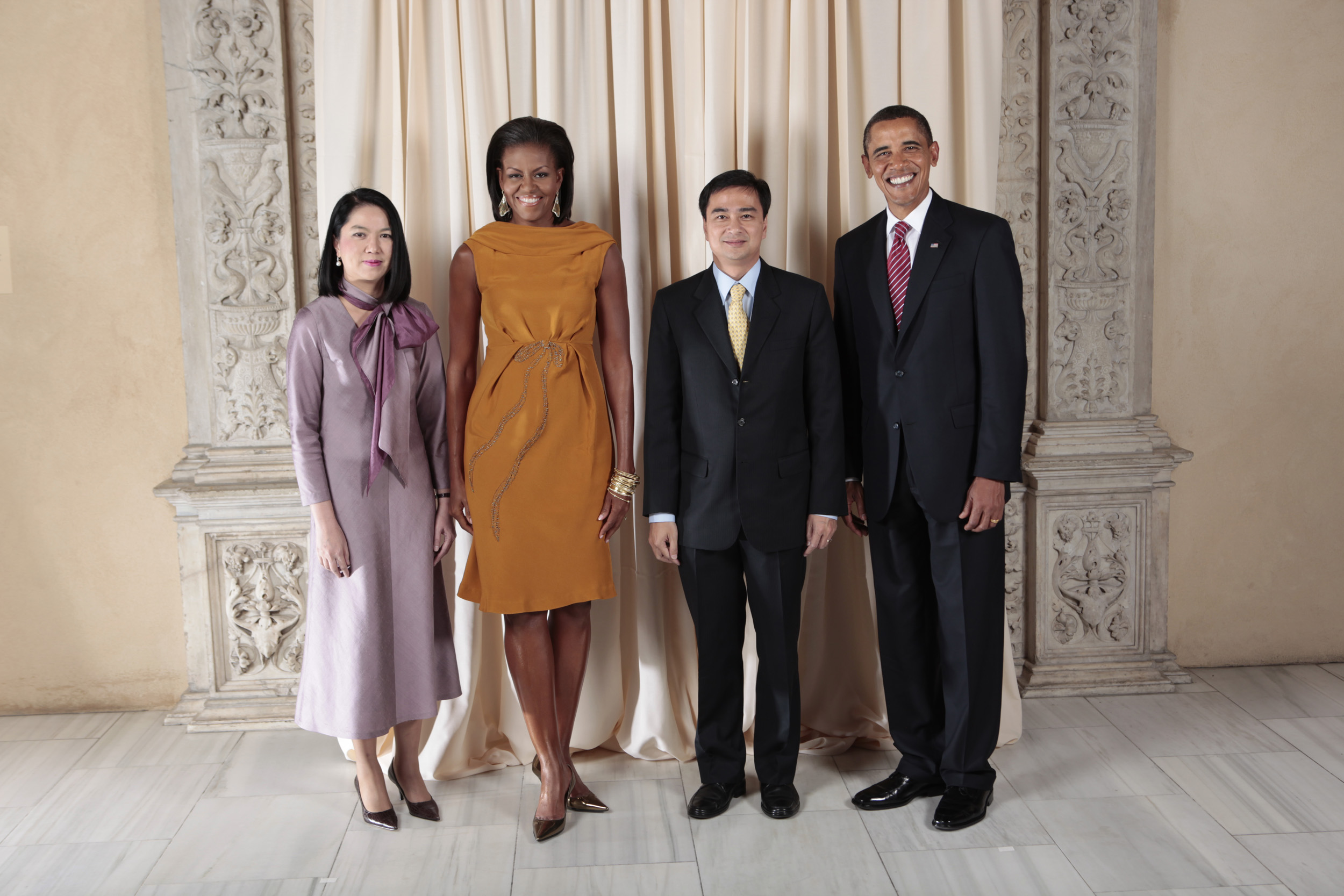

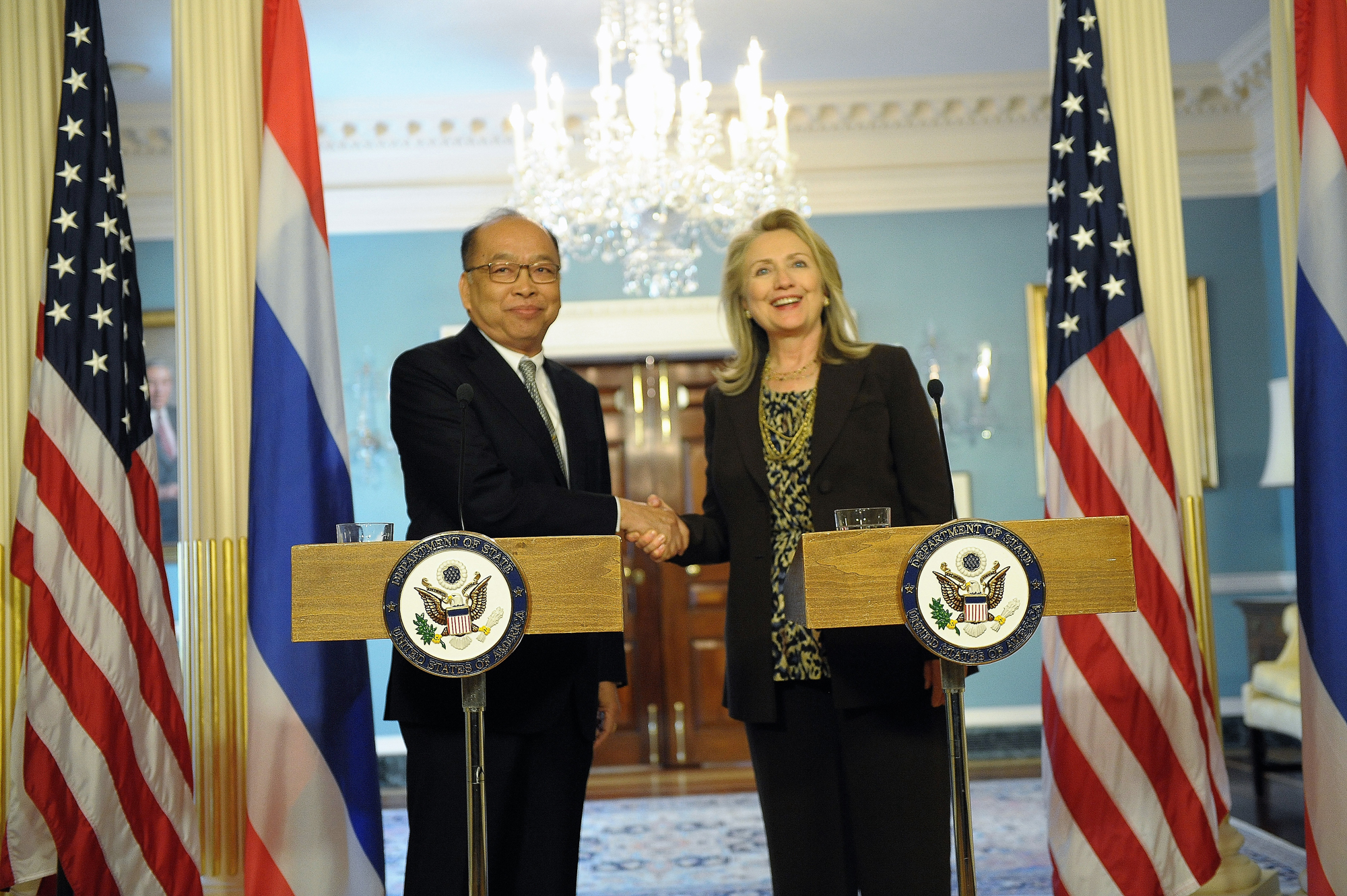

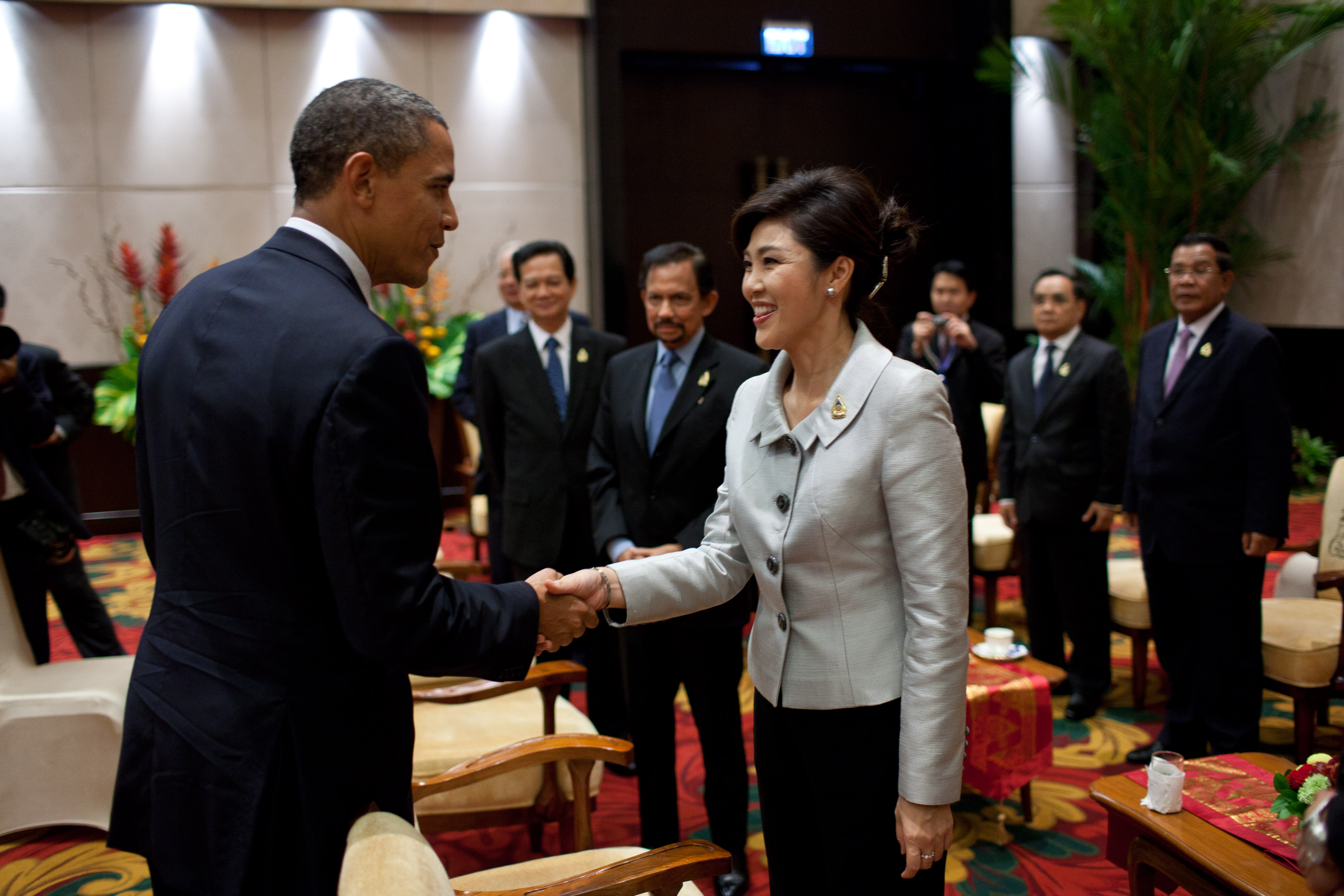

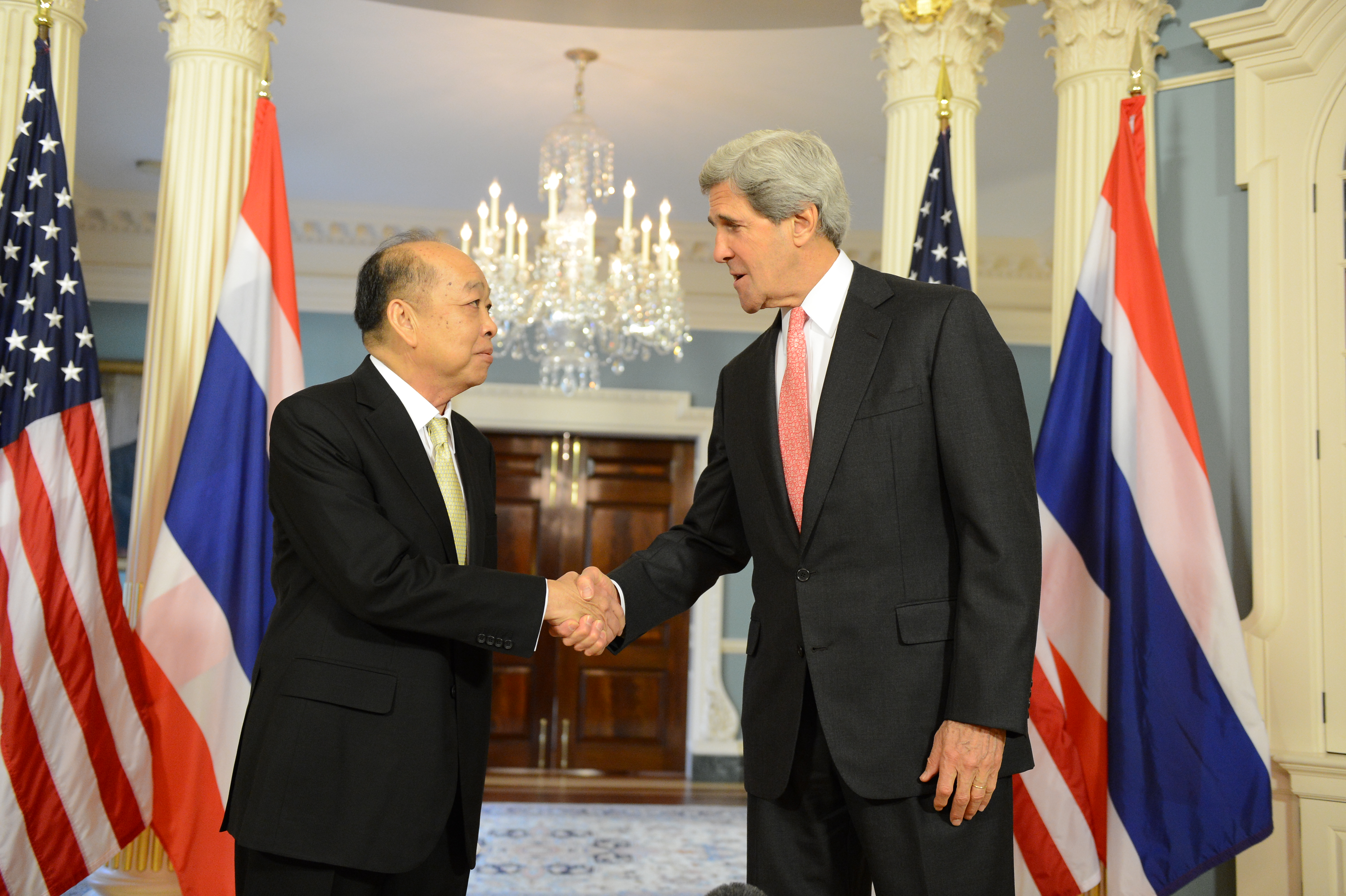

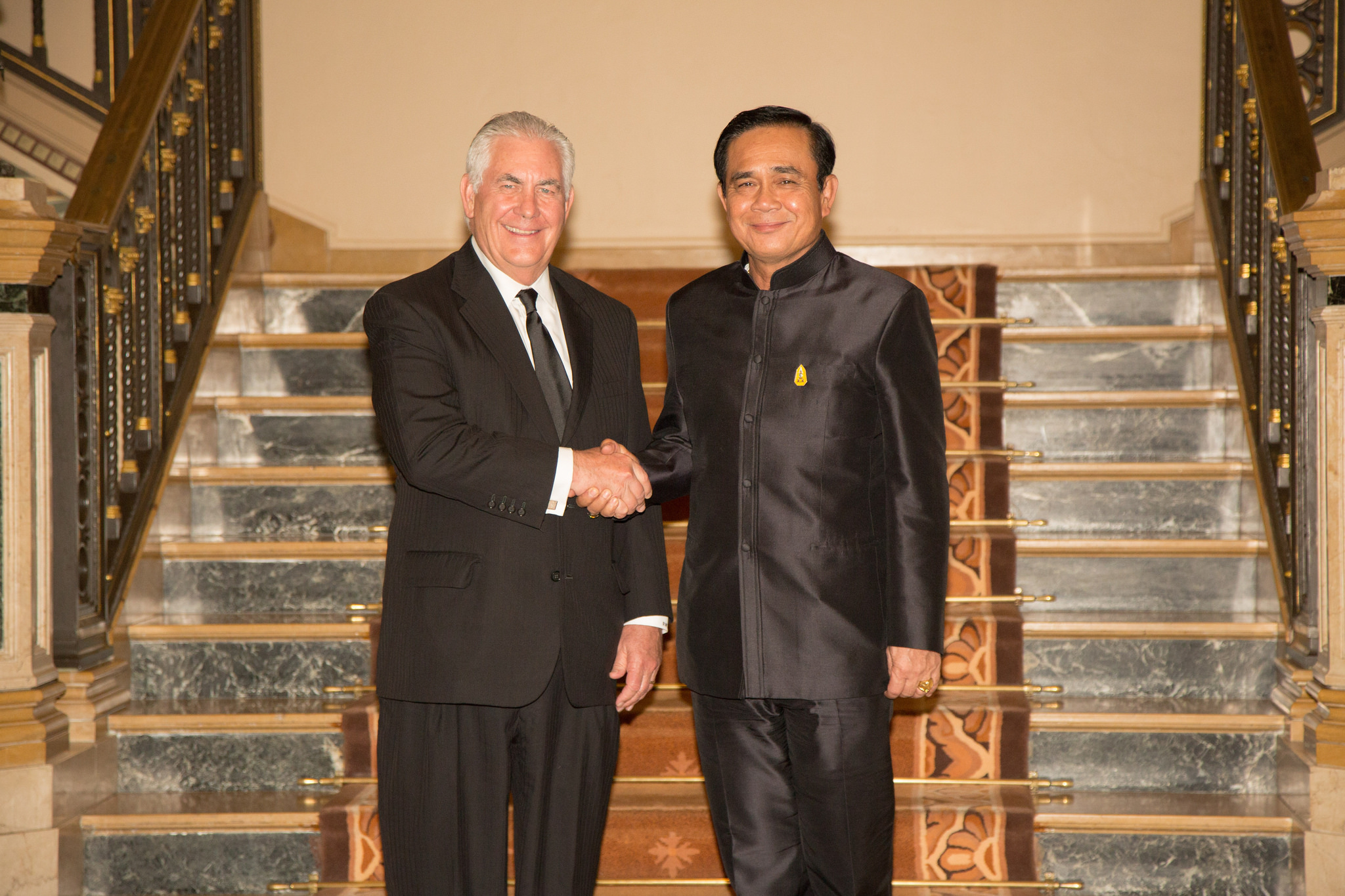

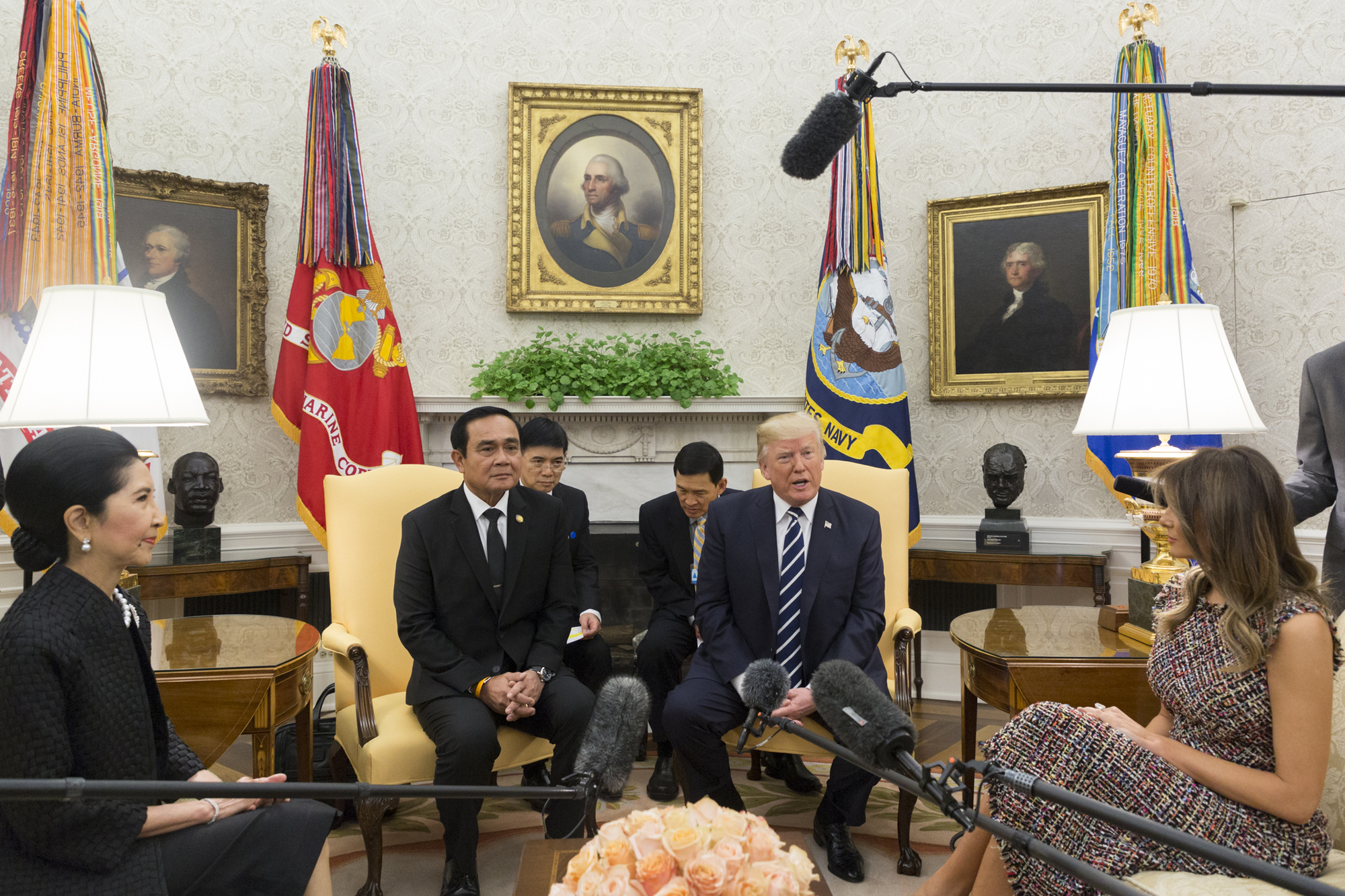

== Turkey ==
Table of Trips
Start	End	Guest	Title	Reason
January 27, 1954	January 30, 1954	Celal Bayar	Prime Minister	At the invitation of the President. Addressed U.S. Congress January 29. Afterwards visited Princeton, New York City, Cleveland and Toledo, Chicago, San Francisco, Los Angeles, Las Vegas, Dallas, and Raleigh.Private visit to New York City February 20.Departed U.S.February 27.
June 1, 1954	June 5, 1954	Adnan Menderes	Prime Minister	Official visit. Discussed economic and financial matters.
October 7, 1959	October 9, 1959	Adnan Menderes	Prime Minister	Attended CENTO Ministerial Meeting.
November 24, 1963	November 25, 1963	İsmet İnönü	Prime Minister	Attended funeral of President Kennedy.
June 22, 1964	June 23, 1964	İsmet İnönü	Prime Minister	Informal visit. In U.S. June 21. Visited Williamsburg and New York City.
April 3, 1967	April 5, 1967	Cevdet Sunay	President	State visit. In U.S. April 2–13; visited Philadelphia, Cape Kennedy, Palm Springs, Los Angeles, San Francisco, Kansas City, Chicago, Detroit, Lansing, Niagara Falls, and New York City.
March 31, 1969	April 1, 1969	Süleyman Demirel	Prime Minister	Attended funeral of former President Eisenhower; met with President Nixon April 1.
March 22, 1972	March 21, 1972	Nihat Erim	Prime Minister	official visit. In U.S. March 18–23. Also visited New York City.
May 30, 1978	May 31, 1978	Bülent Ecevit	Prime Minister	Attended NATO Summit conference.
April 1, 1985	April 5, 1985	Turgut Özal	Prime Minister	Official Working Visit.
February 2, 1987	February 8, 1987	Turgut Özal	Prime Minister	Private Visit. Met with President Reagan February 5.
June 26, 1988	June 30, 1988	Kenan Evren	President	State Visit; visited New York City, June 30 – July 3.
September 25, 1990	September 25, 1990	Turgut Özal	President	Met with President Bush during a private visit.
March 23, 1991	March 25, 1991	Turgut Özal	President	Met with President Bush during a private visit.
February 10, 1992	February 12, 1992	Süleyman Demirel	Prime Minister	Official working visit.
April 28, 1992	April 30, 1992	Turgut Özal	President	Met with President Bush during a private visit.
February 8, 1993	February 8, 1993	Turgut Özal	President	Met with President Clinton during a private visit. Arrived in the U.S. January 26; also visited Fort Lauderdale
October 14, 1993	October 18, 1993	Tansu Çiller	Prime Minister	Met with President Clinton during a private visit.
April 14, 1994	April 14, 1994	Tansu Çiller	Prime Minister	Met with President Clinton during a private visit.
April 18, 1995	April 20, 1995	Tansu Çiller	Prime Minister	Met with President Clinton during a private visit. Arrived in the U.S. April 17 in New York City. Later attended Houston International Festival.
October 18, 1995	October 18, 1995	Süleyman Demirel	President	Working visit.
March 27, 1996	March 30, 1996	Süleyman Demirel	President	Working visit.
December 18, 1997	December 21, 1997	Mesut Yılmaz	Prime Minister	Working visit.
April 23, 1999	April 25, 1999	Süleyman Demirel	President	Attended NATO's 50th Anniversary Summit
September 26, 1999	September 29, 1999	Bülent Ecevit	Prime Minister	Official working visit.
September 7, 2000	September 7, 2000	Ahmet Necdet Sezer	President	Met with President Clinton at the UN Millennium Summit in New York City.
January 14, 2002	January 18, 2002	Bülent Ecevit	Prime Minister	Working visit.
January 27, 2004	January 28, 2004	Recep Tayyip Erdoğan	Prime Minister	Working visit. Also visited New York City.
June 9, 2004	June 11, 2004	Recep Tayyip Erdoğan	Prime Minister	Met with President Bush during the G-8 Economic Summit at Sea Island. Attended the funeral of Former President Reagan.
June 7, 2005	June 8, 2005	Recep Tayyip Erdoğan	Prime Minister	Working visit.
September 30, 2006	October 2, 2006	Recep Tayyip Erdoğan	Prime Minister	Working visit.
November 4, 2007	November 5, 2007	Recep Tayyip Erdoğan	Prime Minister	Working visit.
January 7, 2008	January 8, 2008	Abdullah Gül	President	Working visit.
November 14, 2008	November 15, 2008	Recep Tayyip Erdoğan	Prime Minister	Attended the G-20 Economic Summit meeting.
September 24, 2009	September 25, 2009	Recep Tayyip Erdoğan	Prime Minister	Attended the G-20 Economic Summit meeting.
December 7, 2009	December 7, 2009	Recep Tayyip Erdoğan	Prime Minister	Working Visit.
April 12, 2010	April 13, 2010	Recep Tayyip Erdoğan	Prime Minister	Attended the Nuclear Security Summit.
September 20, 2011	September 20, 2011	Recep Tayyip Erdoğan	Prime Minister	Met with President Obama at the UN General Assembly in New York City.
May 20, 2012	May 21, 2012	Abdullah Gül	President	Working visit.
May 20, 2012	May 21, 2012	Abdullah Gül	President	Attended the NATO Summit meeting in Chicago.
March 31, 2016	April 1, 2016	Recep Tayyip Erdoğan	President	Attended the Nuclear Security Summit.
May 16, 2017	May 16, 2017	Recep Tayyip Erdoğan	President	Official Working Visit.
November 12, 2019	November 13, 2019	Recep Tayyip Erdoğan	President	Working Visit.
September 25, 2025	September 25, 2025	Recep Tayyip Erdoğan	President	Working Visit.

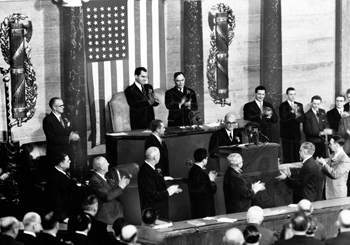

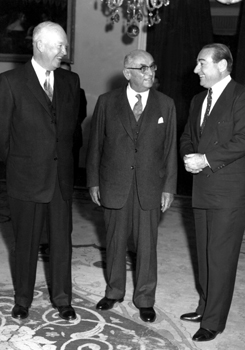

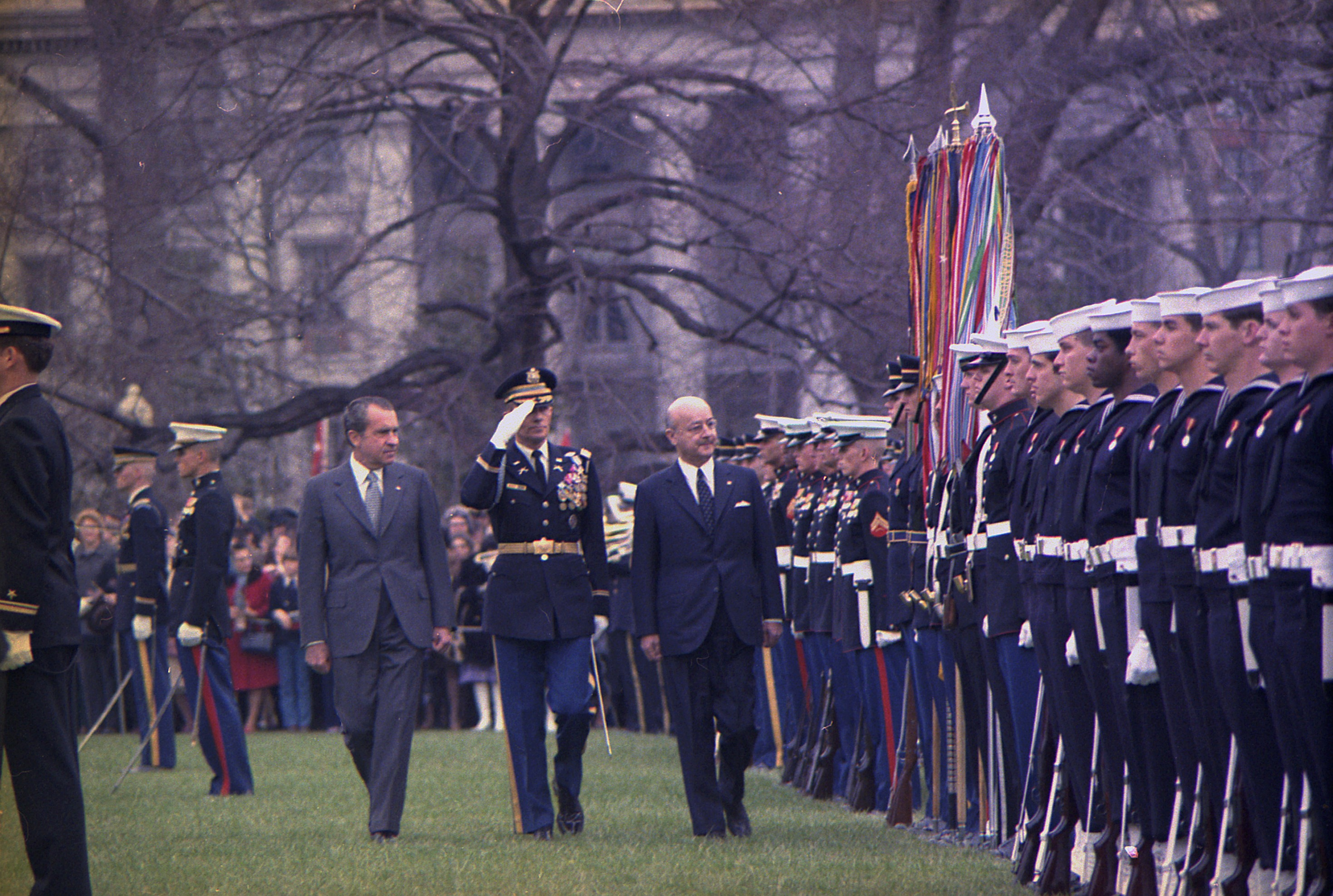

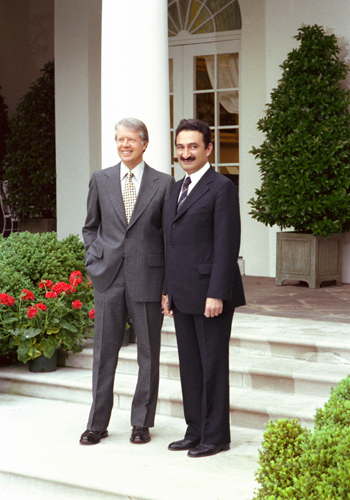

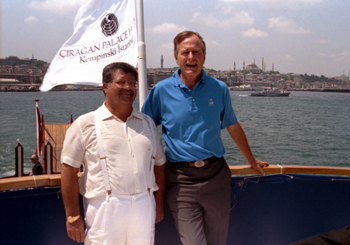

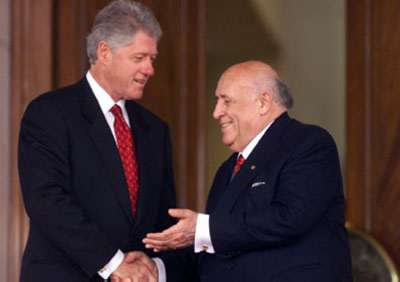

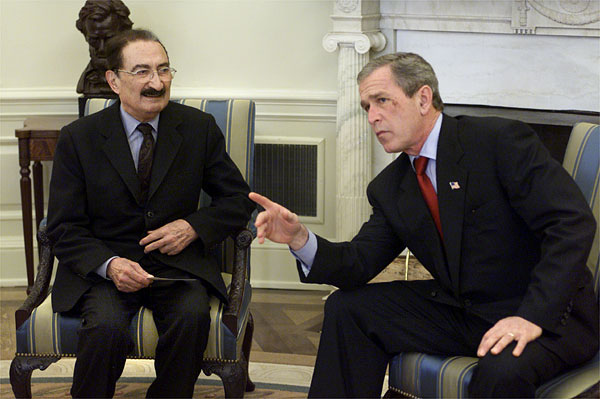

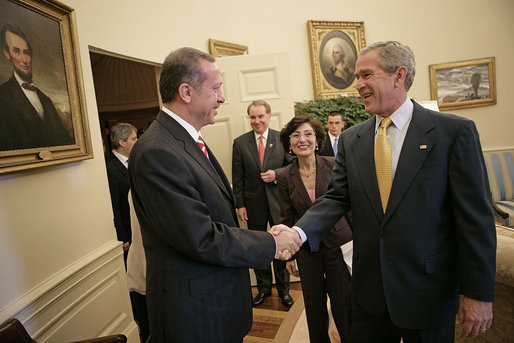

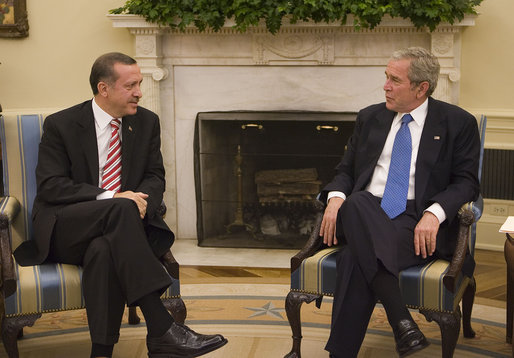

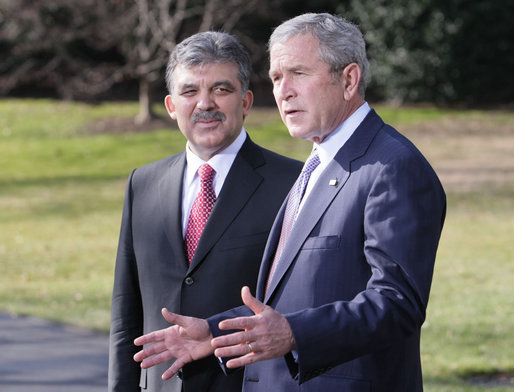

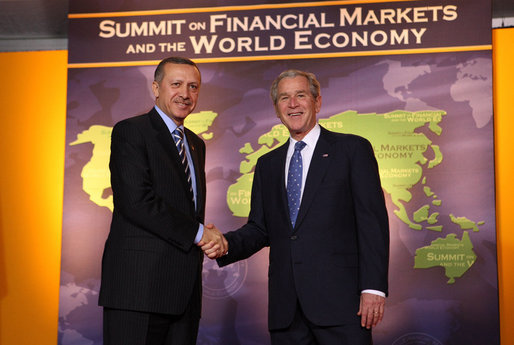

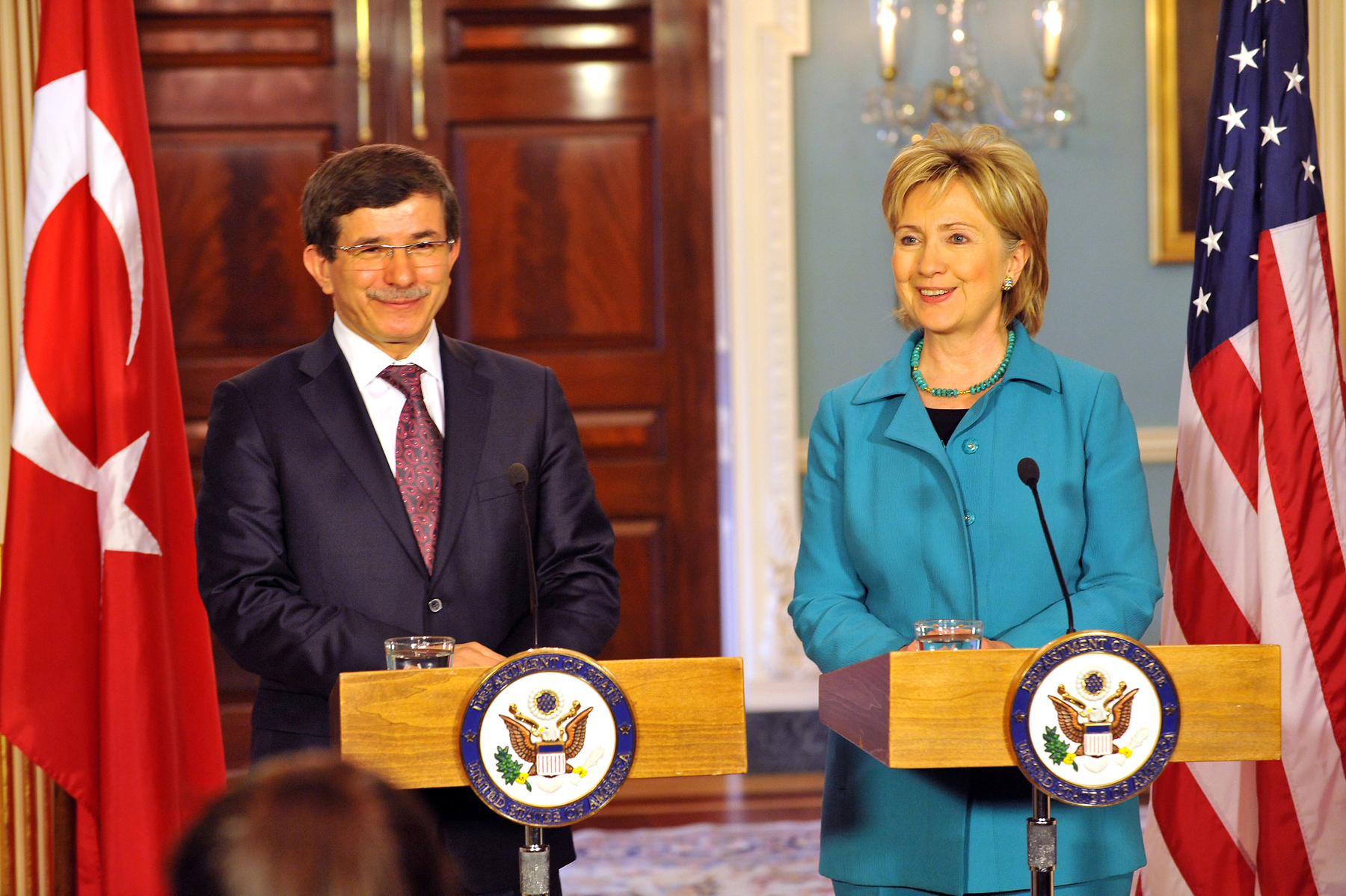

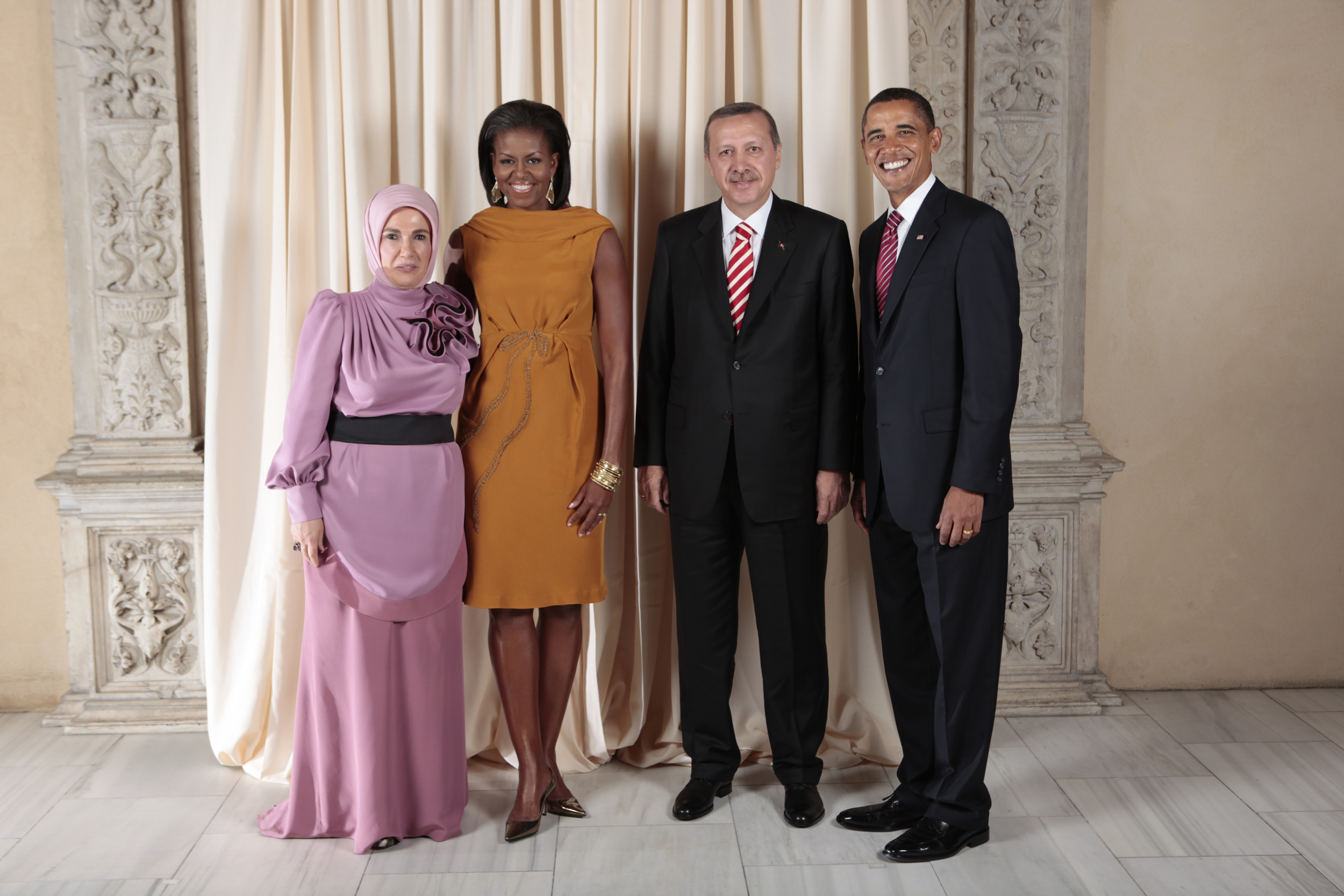

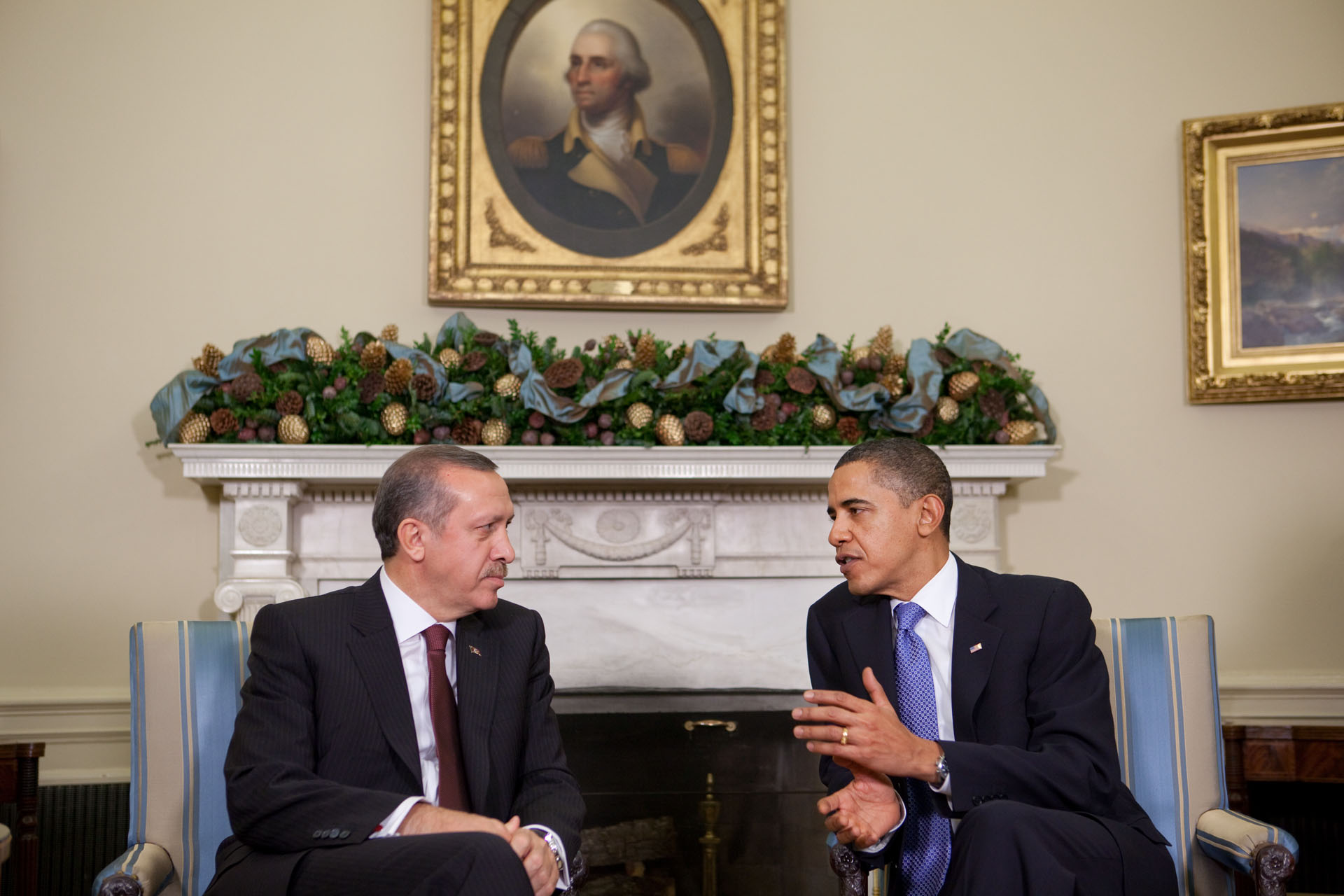

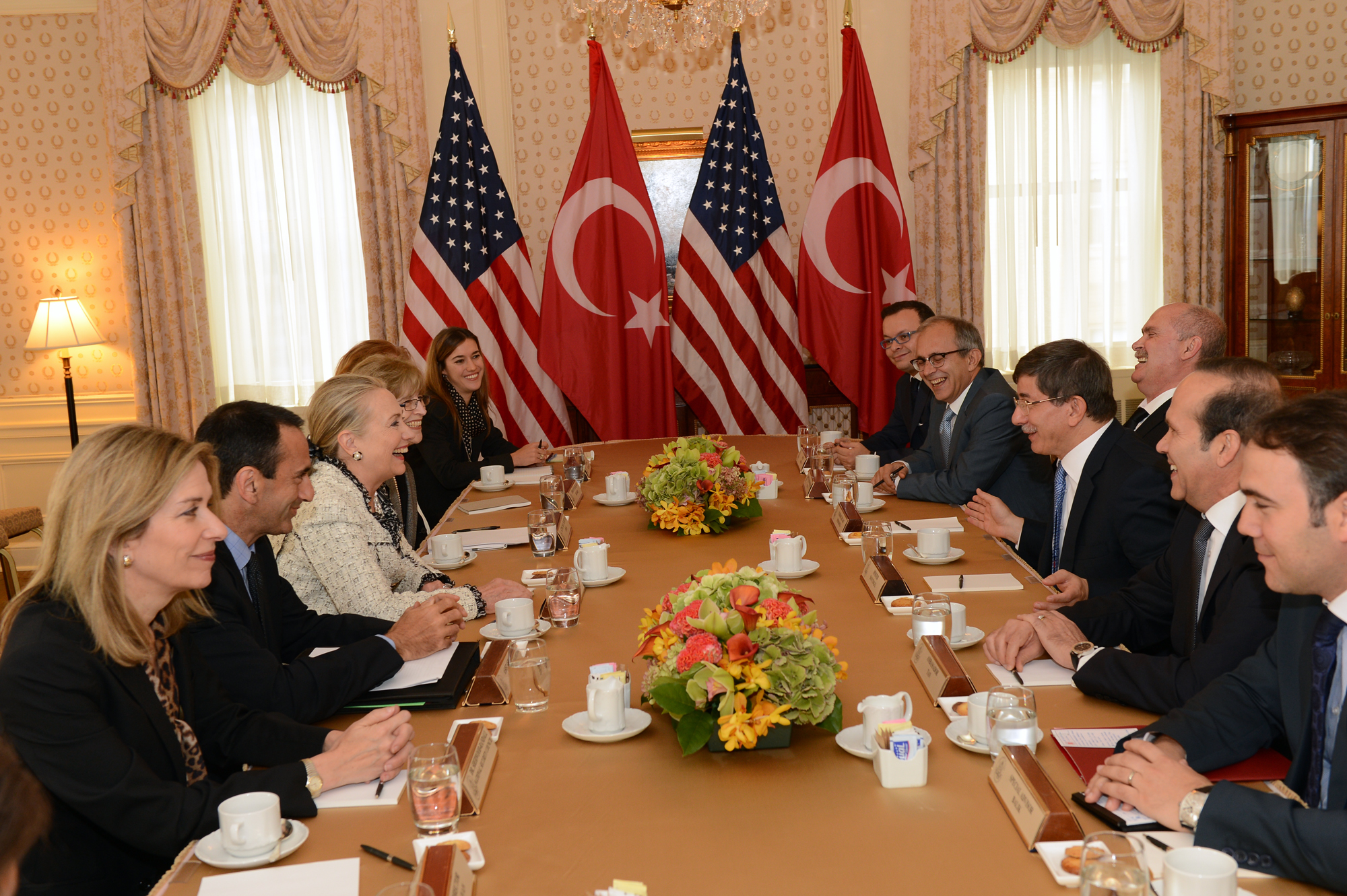

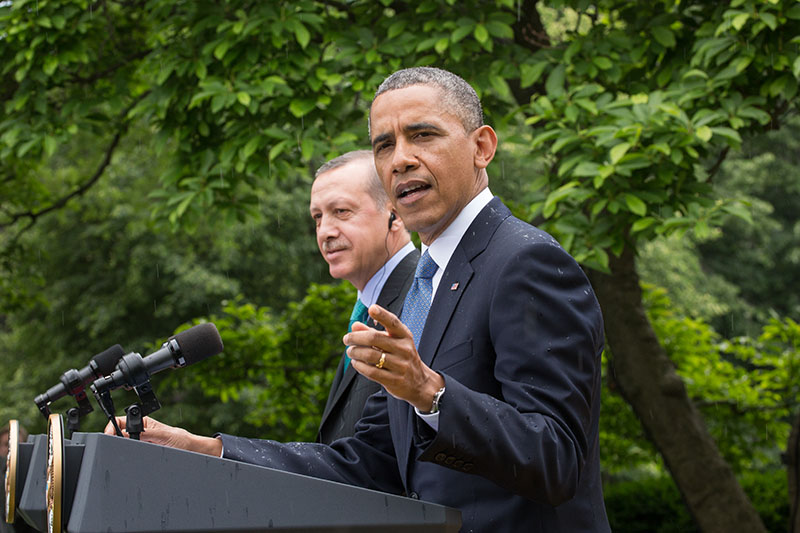

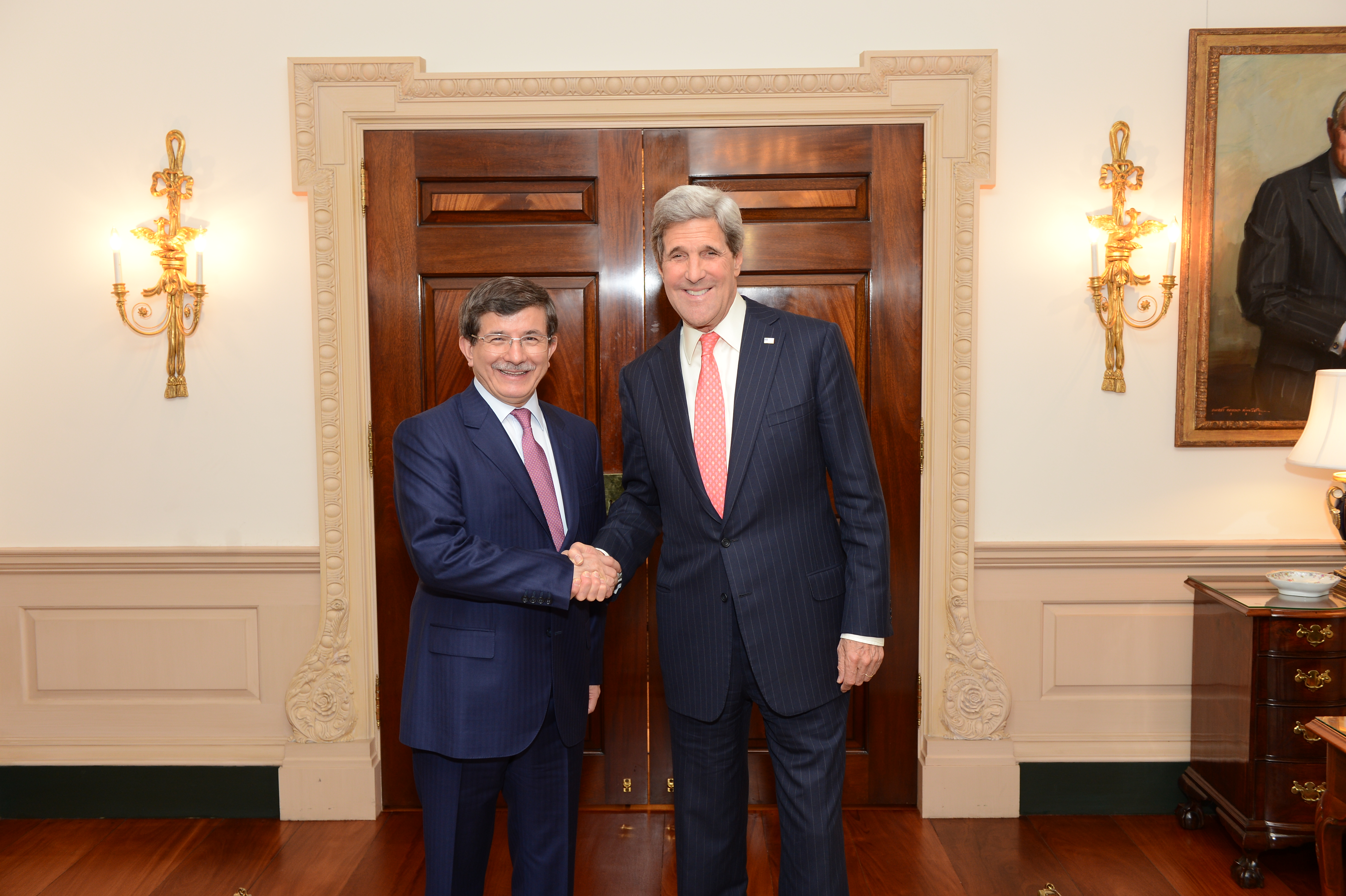

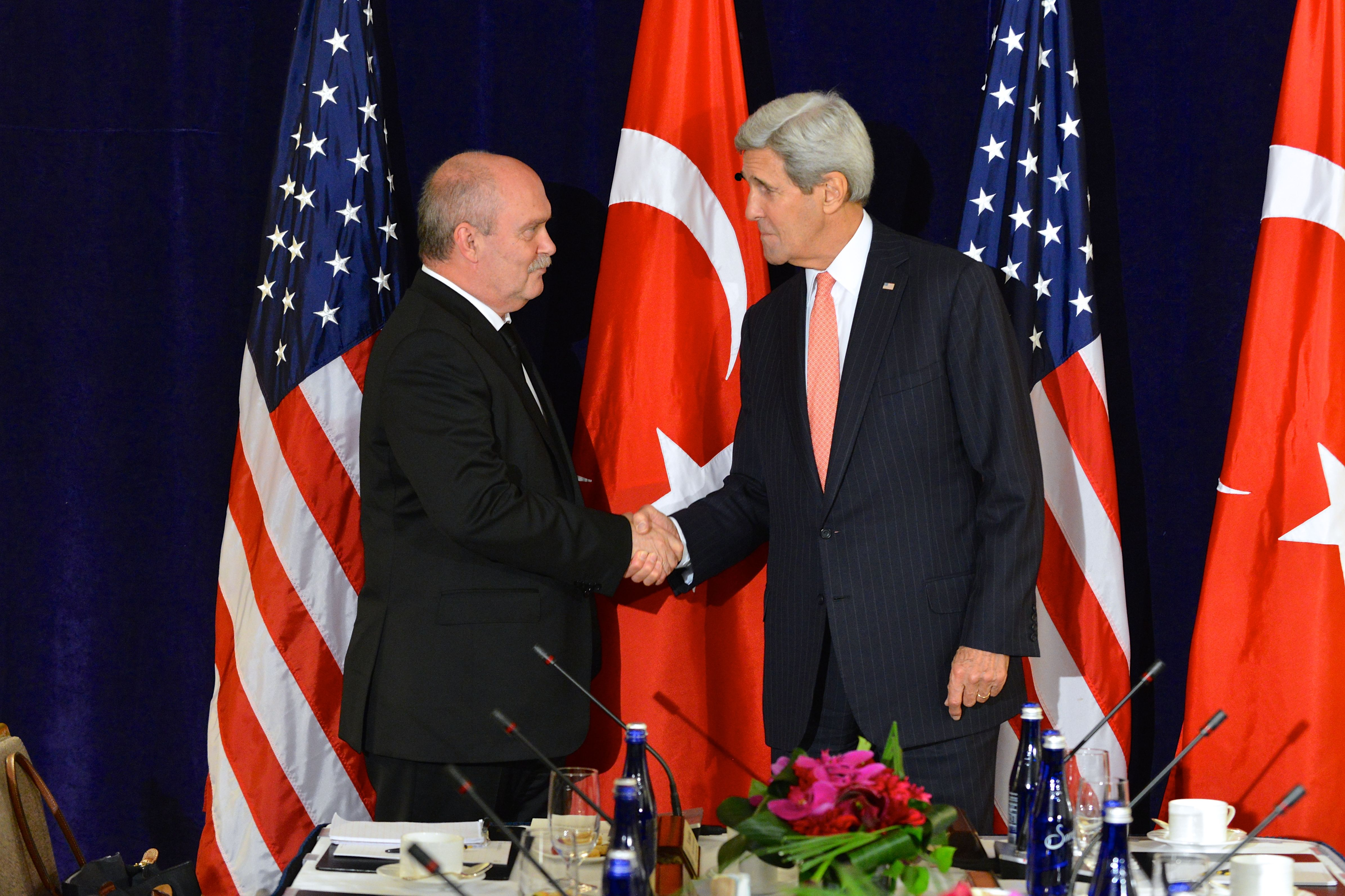

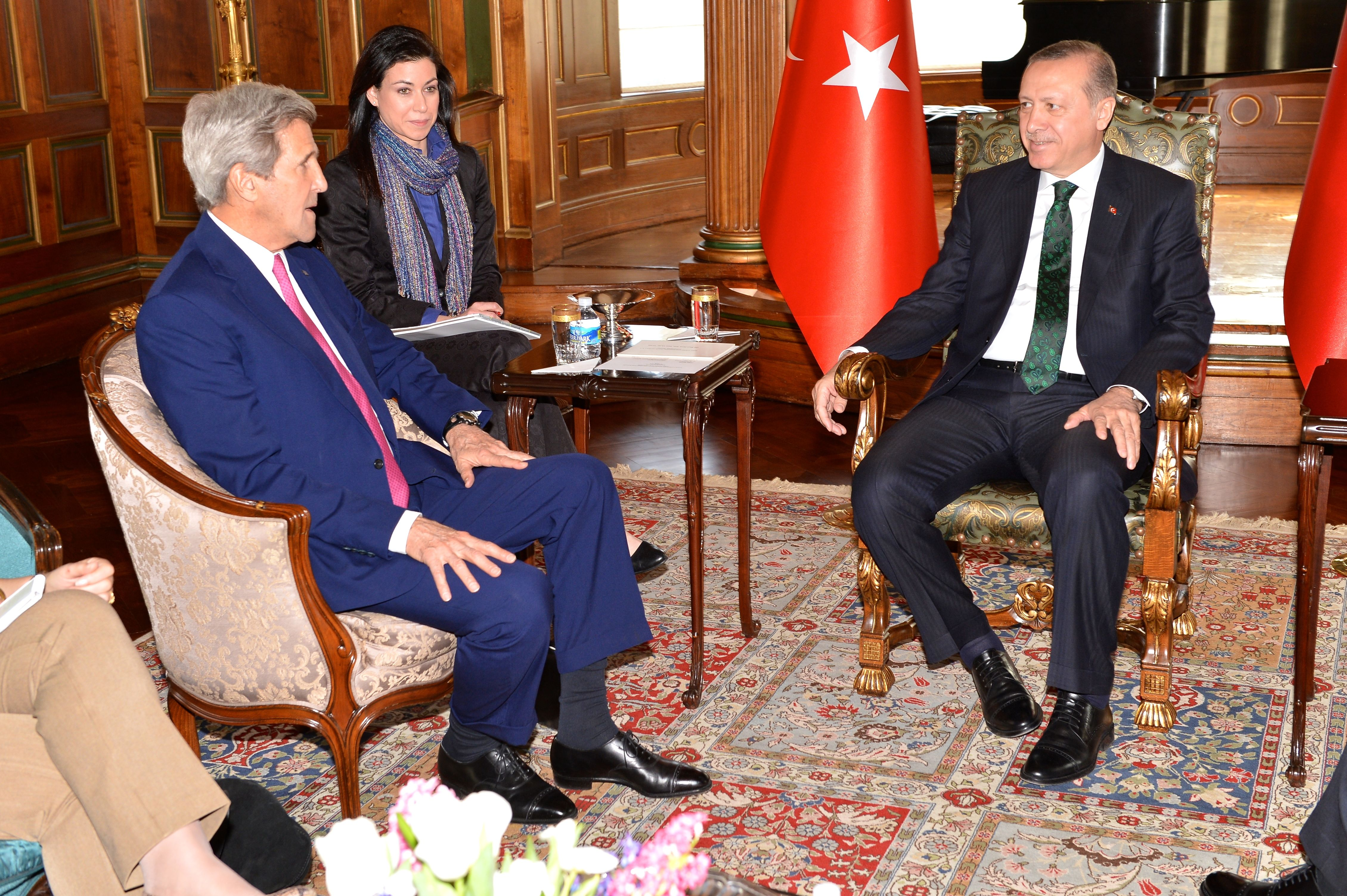

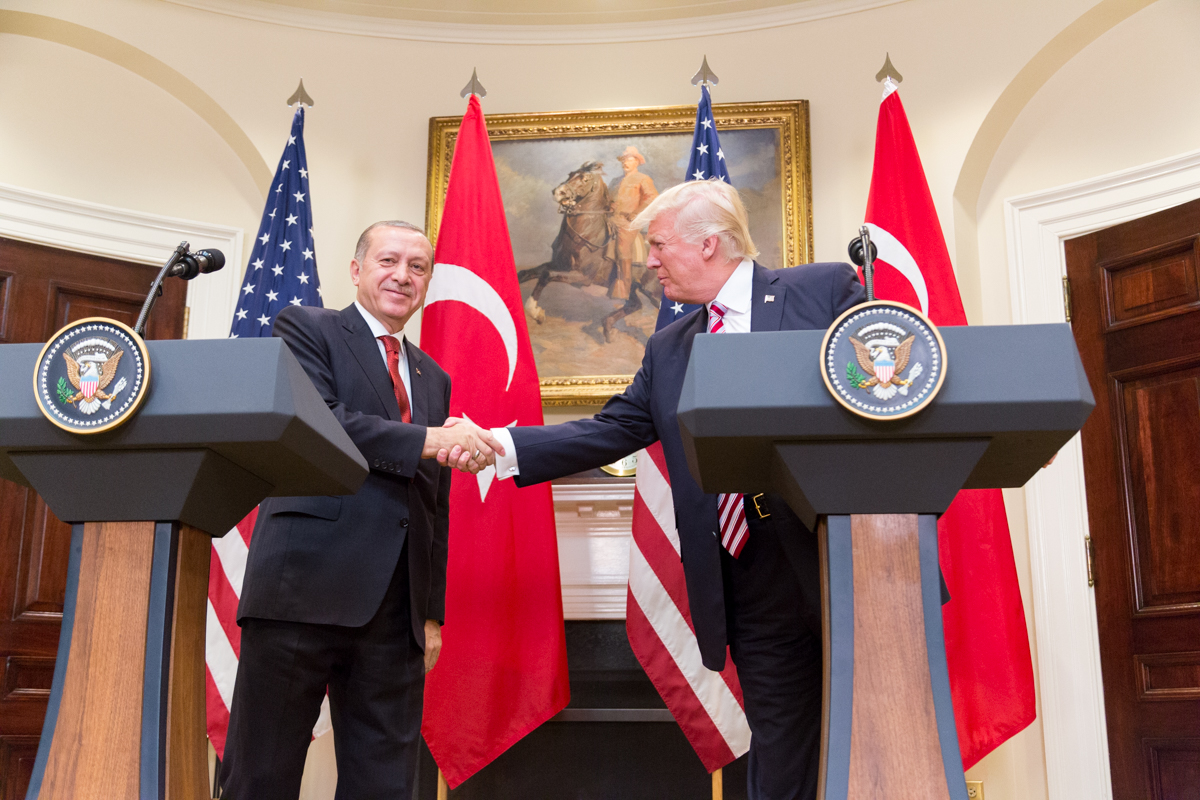

== Turkmenistan ==
Table of Trips
Start	End	Guest	Title	Reason
April 21, 1998	April 23, 1998	Saparmurat Niyazov	President	Working visit. Arrived in the U.S. April 20. Also visited New York City and Chicago. Departed the U.S. April 24.
September 21, 2023	September 21, 2023	Serdar Berdimuhamedow	President	Participated in C5+1 Presidential Summit Meeting with President Biden at the UN General Assembly in New York City.
November 5, 2025	November 7, 2025	Serdar Berdimuhamedow	President	Participated in C5+1 Presidential Summit Meeting with President Trump at the White House.

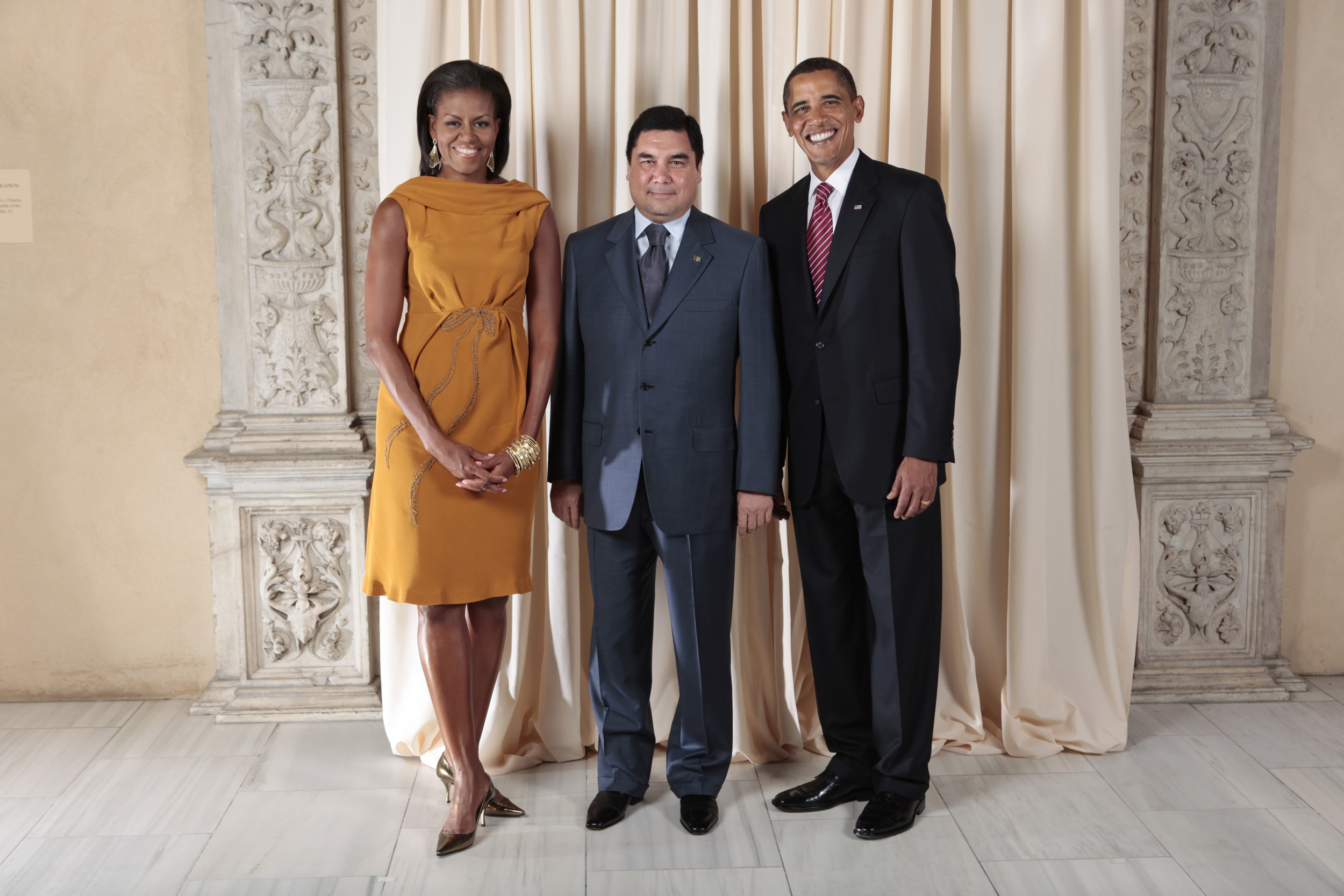

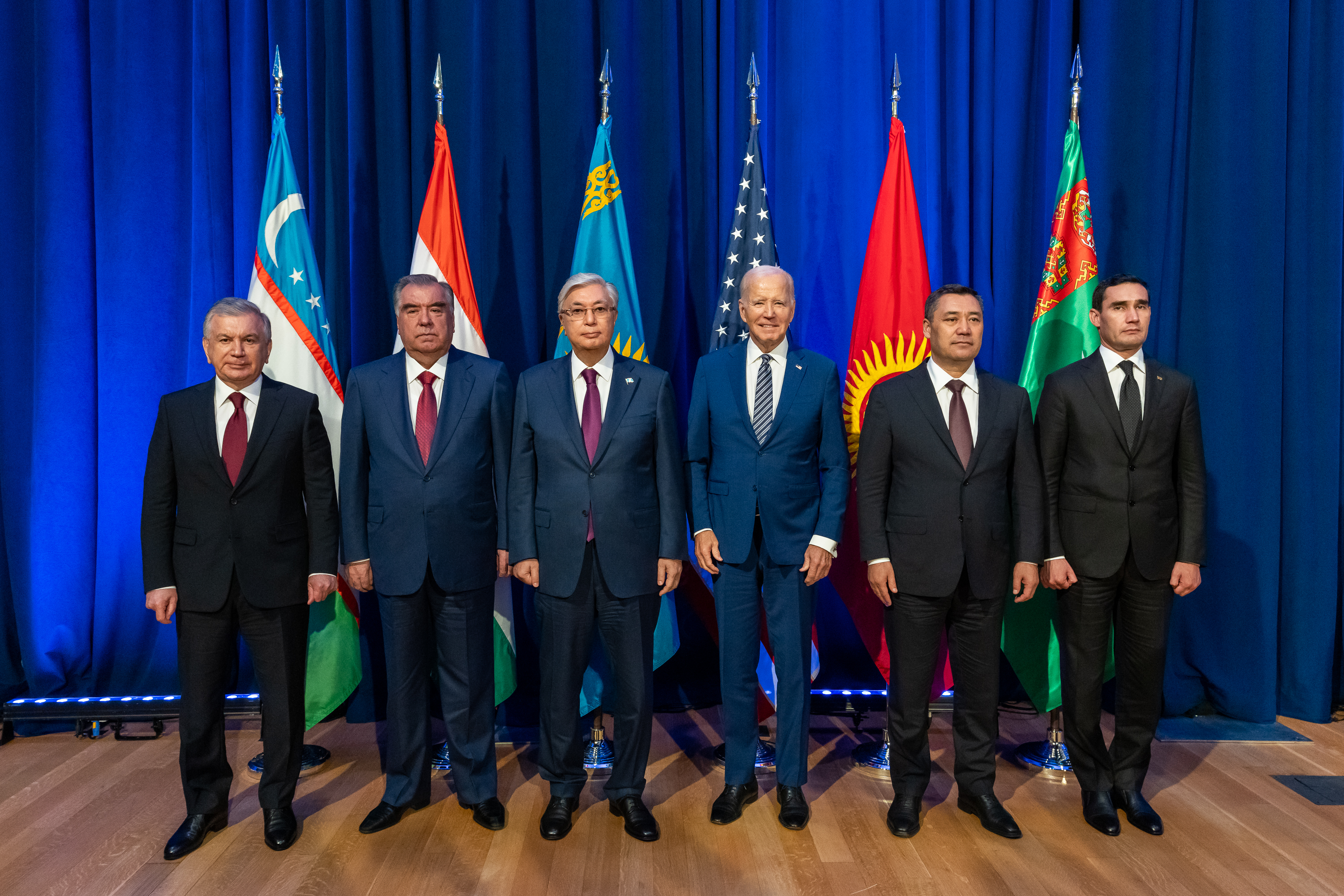

== United Arab Emirates ==
Table of Trips
Start	End	Guest	Title	Reason
September 23, 2024	September 23, 2024	Mohamed bin Zayed Al Nahyan	President	Official visit.

== Uzbekistan ==
Table of Trips
Start	End	Guest	Title	Reason
June 23, 1996	June 26, 1996	Islom Karimov	President	Inaugurated a new embassy during a private visit.
April 23, 1999	April 25, 1999	Islom Karimov	President	Attended NATO's 50th Anniversary Summit
March 11, 2002	March 13, 2002	Islom Karimov	President	Met with President Bush March 12 during a private visit. Also visited New York City.
May 17, 2018	May 18, 2018	Shavkat Mirziyoyev	President	Official Working Visit.
September 21, 2023	September 21, 2023	Shavkat Mirziyoyev	President	Participated in C5+1 Presidential Summit Meeting with President Biden at the UN General Assembly in New York City.
November 4, 2025	November 7, 2025	Shavkat Mirziyoyev	President	Participated in C5+1 Presidential Summit Meeting with President Trump at the White House.

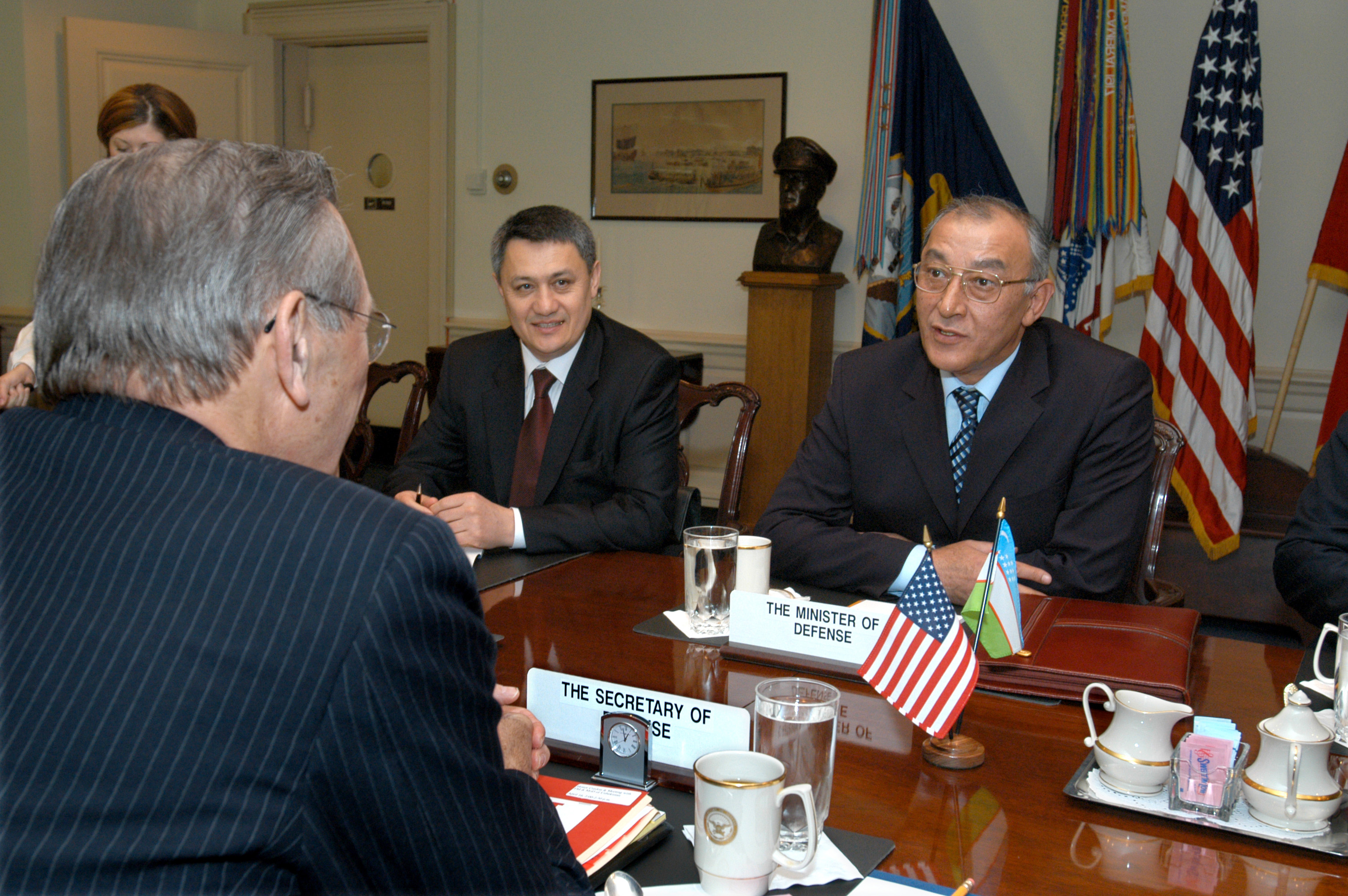

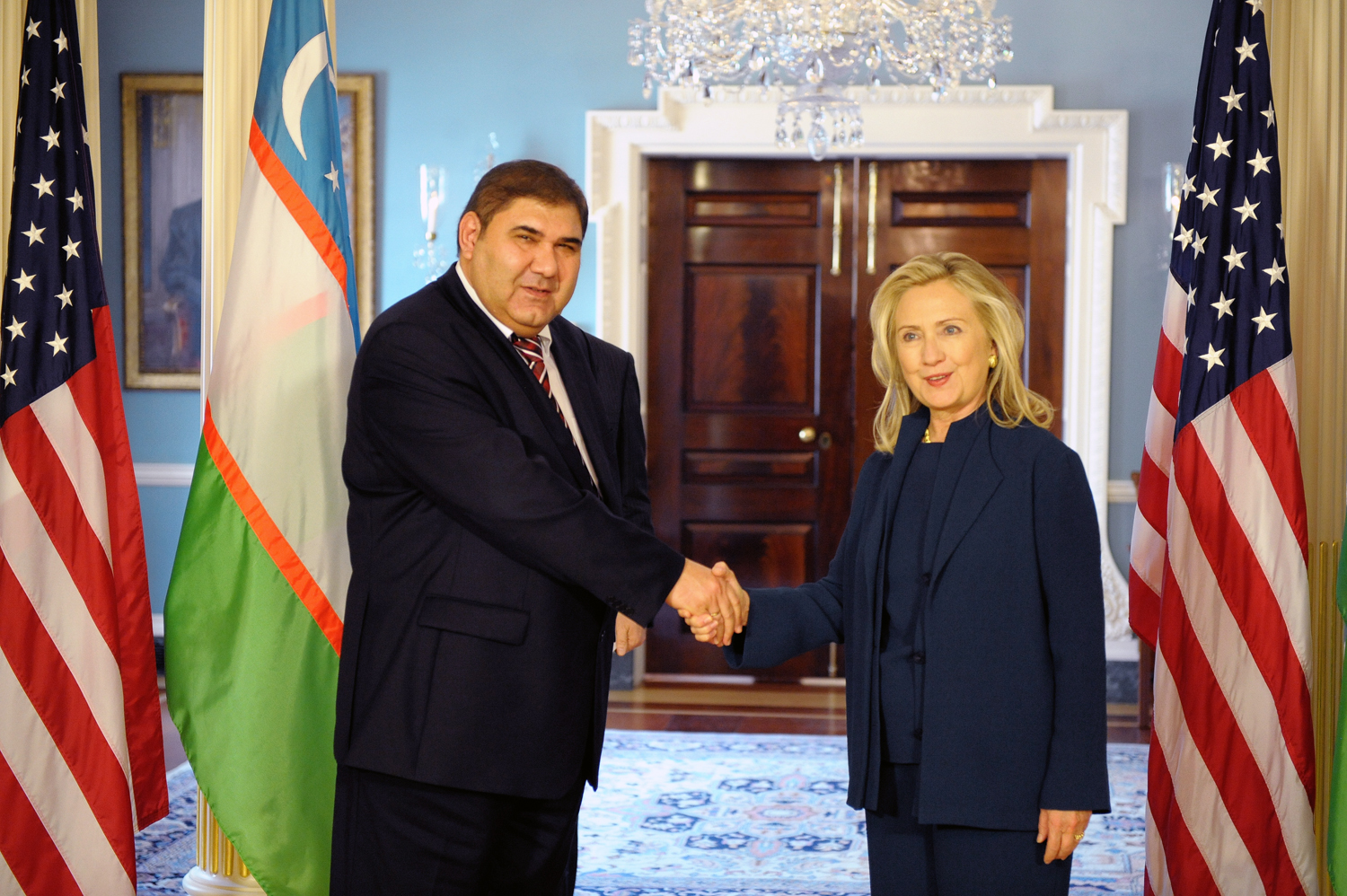

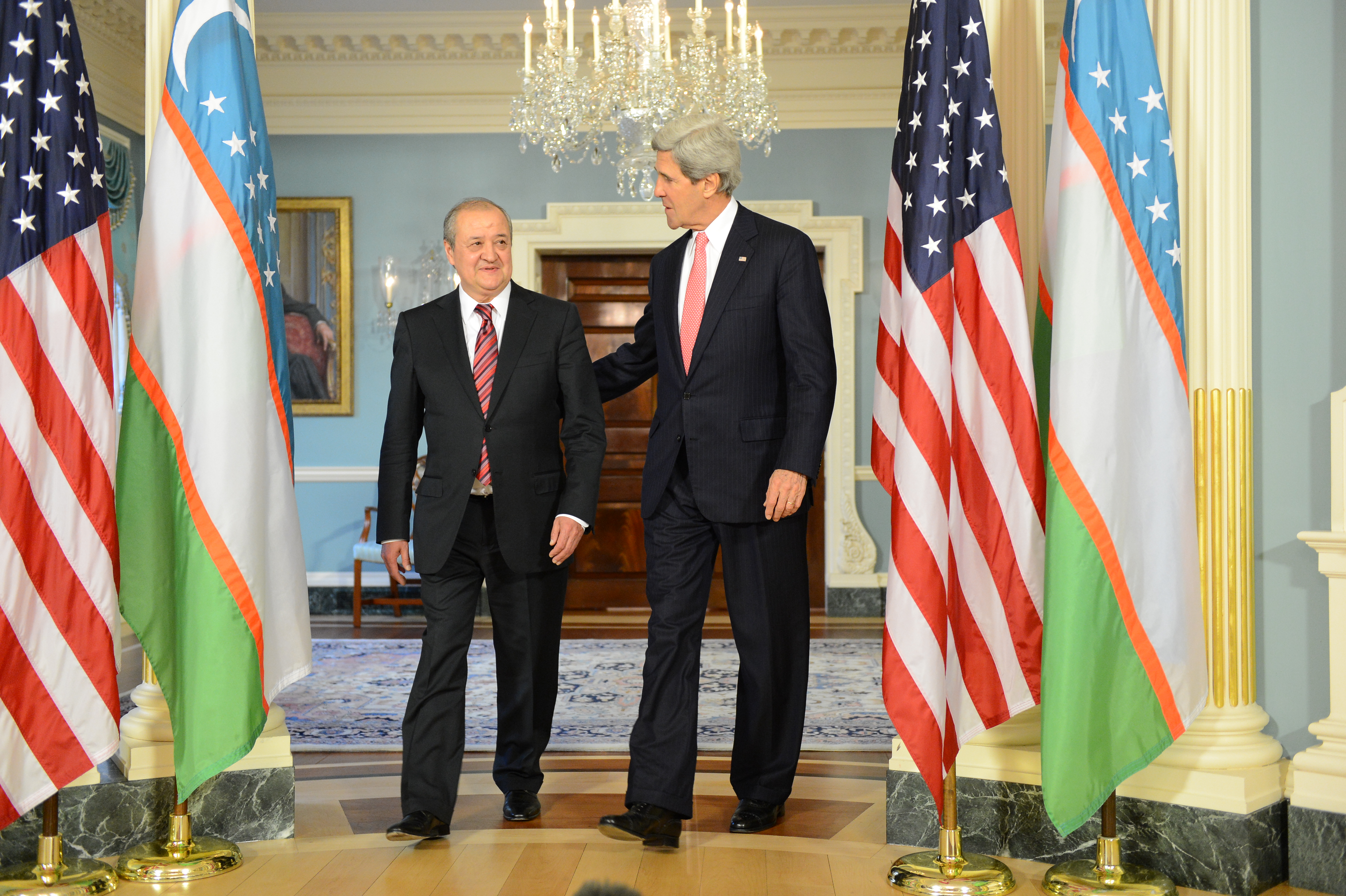

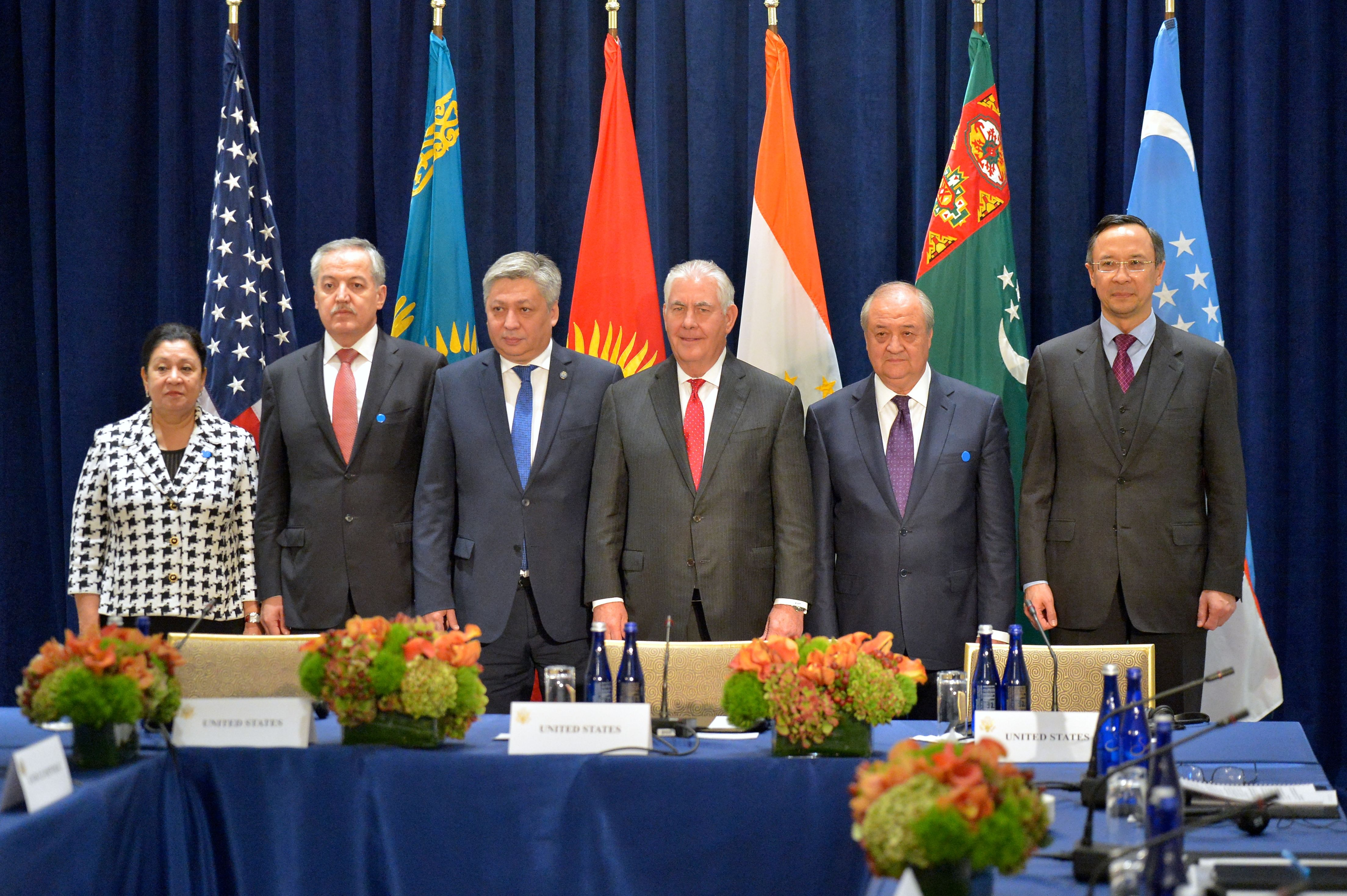

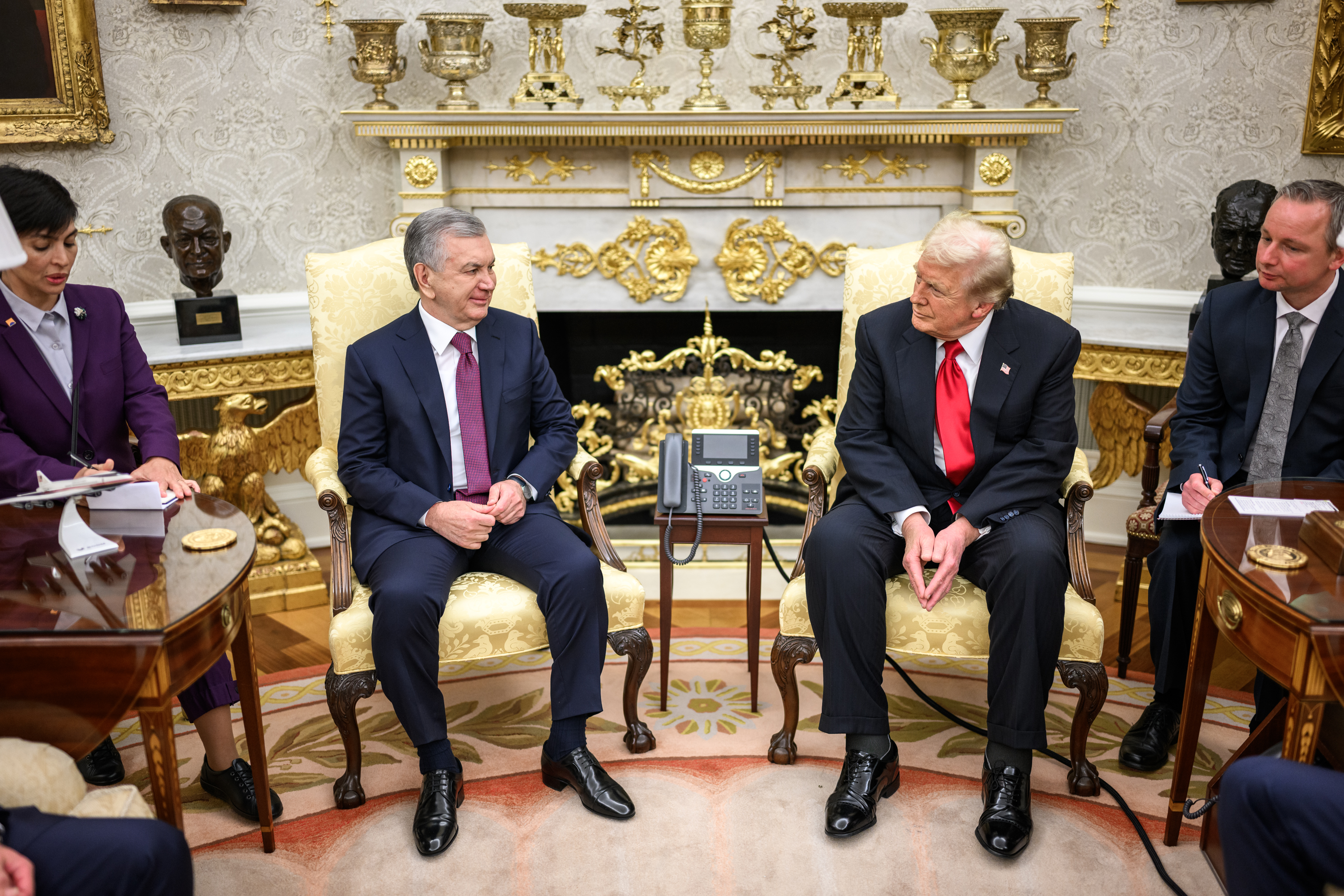

== Vietnam (Republic of) ==
Table of Trips
Start	End	Guest	Title	Reason
September 3, 1951	September 5, 1951	Trần Văn Hữu	Prime Minister	Attended the San Francisco Peace Conference.
May 8, 1957	May 12, 1957	Ngô Đình Diệm	President	State visit. In the U.S. May 5–21. Also visited Honolulu, Hawaii, San Francisco, New York City, Detroit and Lansing, Knoxville and Los Angeles. Addressed U.S.Congress May 9.
February 6, 1966	February 8, 1966	Nguyễn Văn Thiệu	President	Official visit. Conferred with President Johnson in Honolulu, Hawaii on military and economic assistance to Vietnam.
July 19, 1968	July 20, 1968	Nguyễn Văn Thiệu	President	Discussed military developments in Vietnam and political developments in Paris with President Johnson in Honolulu.
June 8, 1969	June 8, 1969	Nguyễn Văn Thiệu	President	Met with President Nixon at Midway Island.
April 2, 1973	April 7, 1973	Nguyễn Văn Thiệu	President	Official visit at San Clemente, and Washington, D.C.

== Vietnam (Socialist Republic of) ==
Table of Trips
Start	End	Guest	Title	Reason
October 25, 1995	October 25, 1995	Lê Đức Anh	President	Met with President Clinton and his wife in New York City on the occasion of coming to the United States to attend the 50th anniversary of the founding of the United Nations.
September 6, 2000	September 6, 2000	Trần Đức Lương	President	Met with President Clinton at the UN Millennium Summit in New York City.
June 21, 2005	June 21, 2005	Phan Văn Khải	Prime Minister	Working visit.
June 20, 2007	June 22, 2007	Nguyễn Minh Triết	President	Working visit.
June 22, 2008	June 25, 2008	Nguyễn Tấn Dũng	Prime Minister	Working visit.
April 12, 2010	April 13, 2010	Nguyễn Tấn Dũng	Prime Minister	Attended the Nuclear Security Summit
November 10, 2011	November 13, 2011	Trương Tấn Sang	President	Attended the Asia-Pacific Economic Cooperation Summit at Honolulu and Kapolei, Hawaii.
July 25, 2013	July 25, 2013	Trương Tấn Sang	President	Working visit.
February 16, 2016	February 18, 2016	Nguyễn Tấn Dũng	Prime Minister	Attended the ASEAN Leaders Summit at Sunnylands, California
May 31, 2017	May 31, 2017	Nguyễn Xuân Phúc	Prime Minister	Official Working Visit.
May 12, 2022	May 13, 2022	Phạm Minh Chính	Prime Minister	Attended the U.S.-ASEAN Summit.
September 25, 2024	September 25, 2024	Tô Lâm	General Secretary	Met with President Biden at the UN General Assembly in New York City.

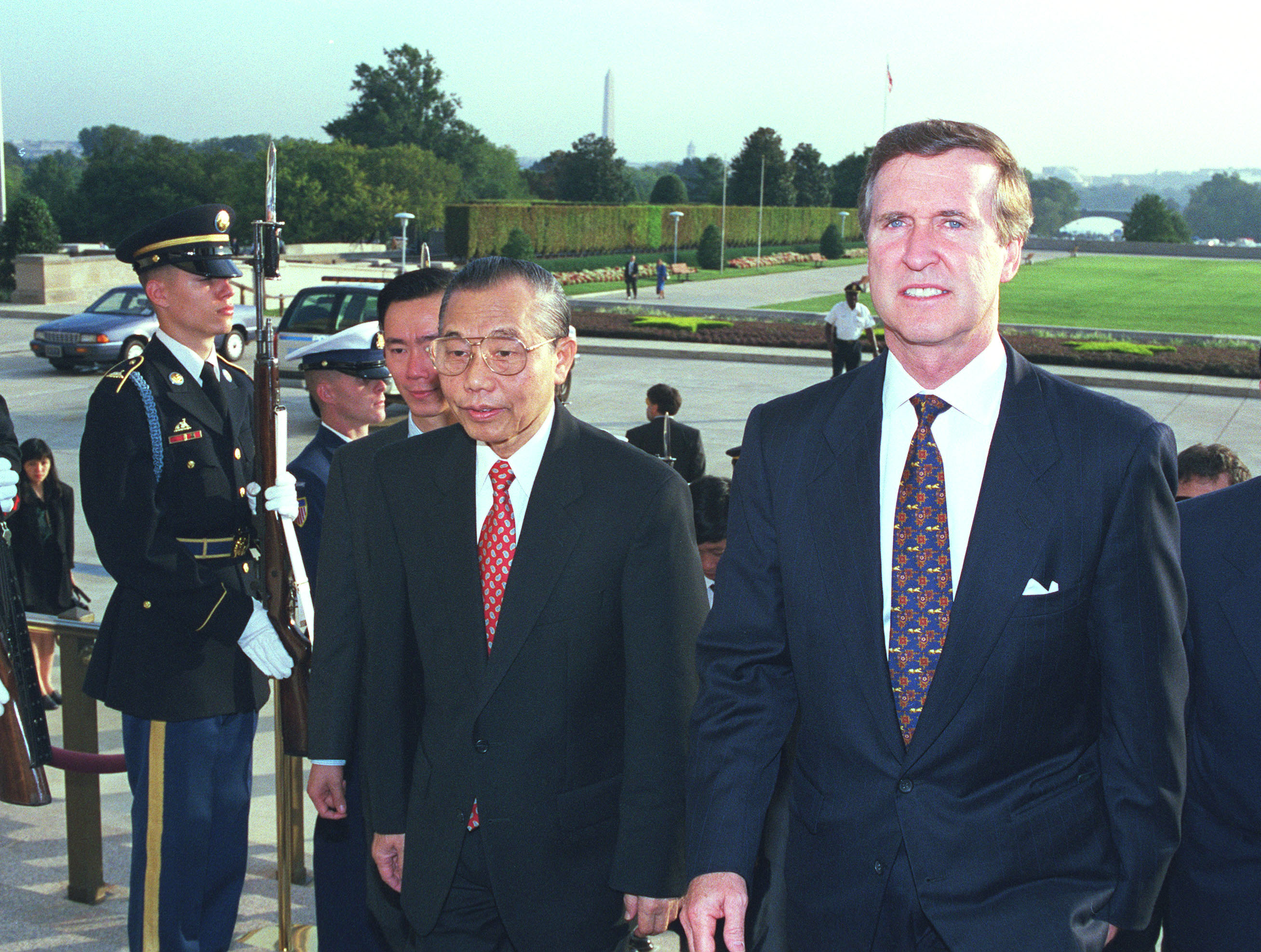

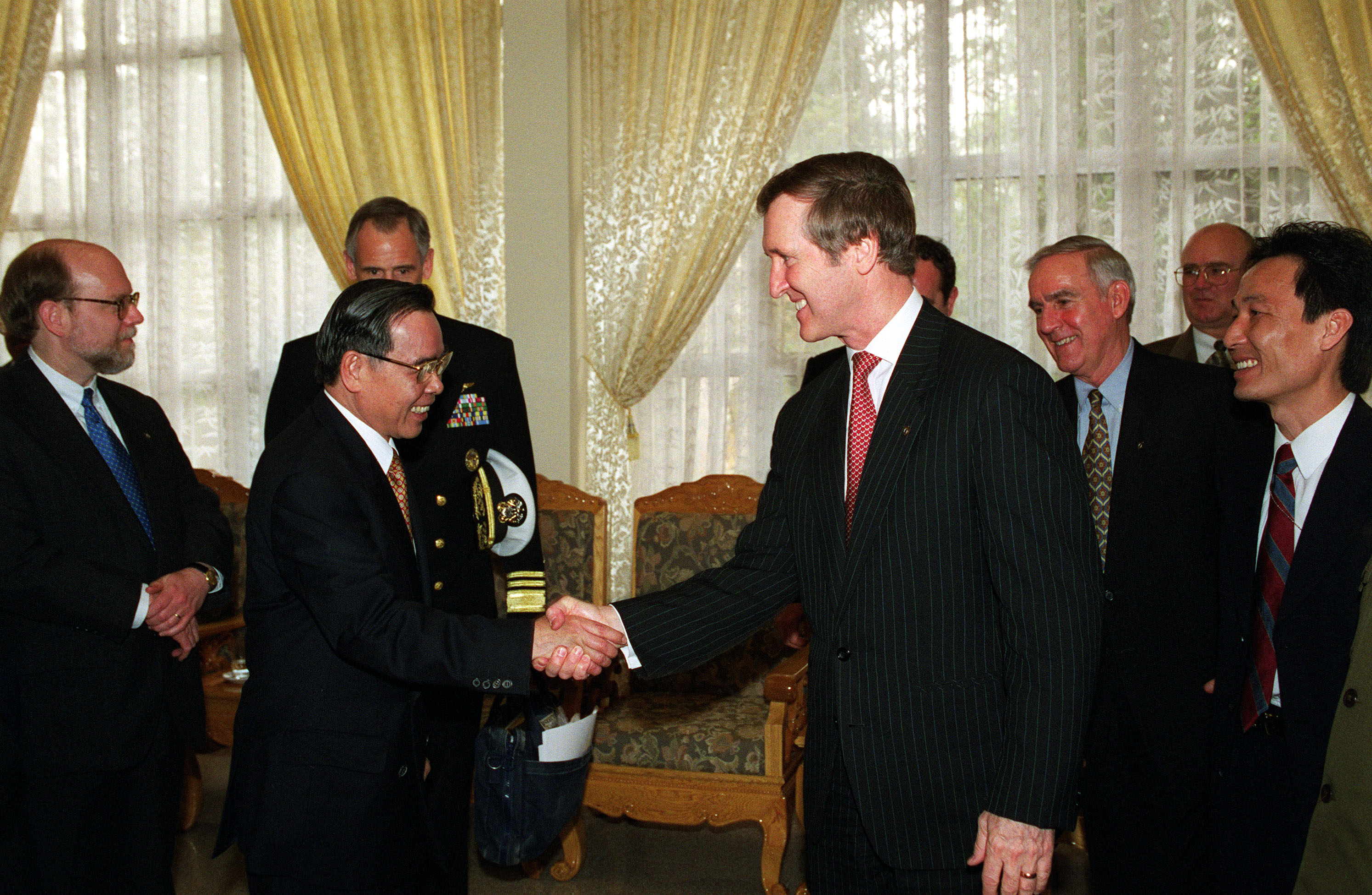

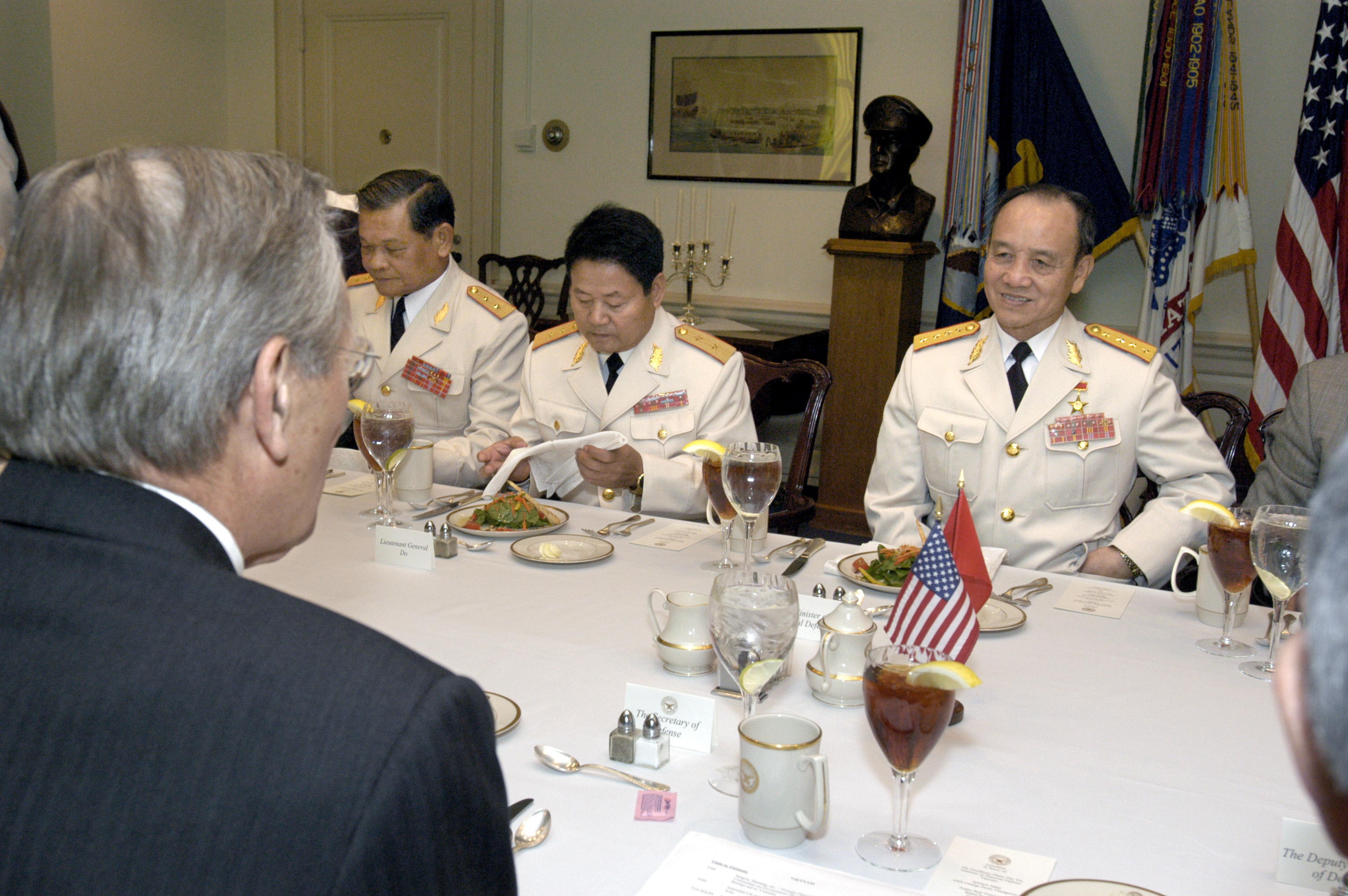

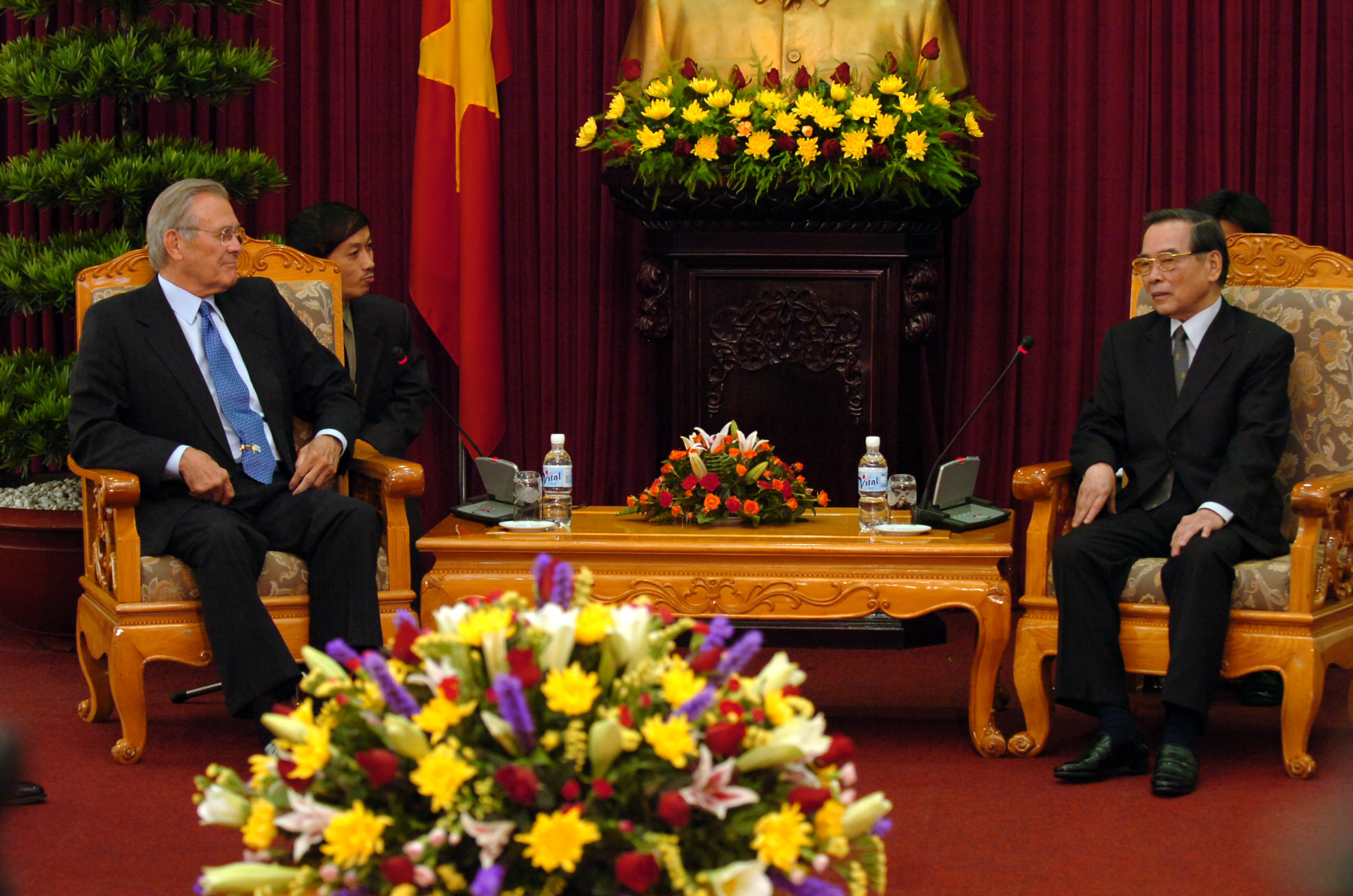

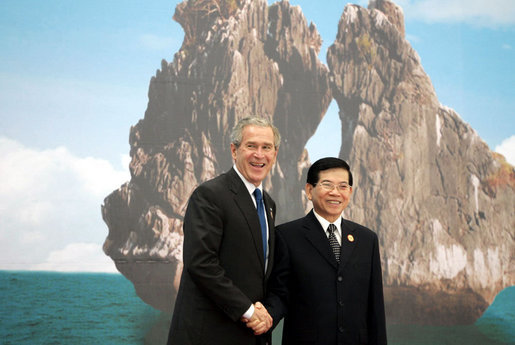

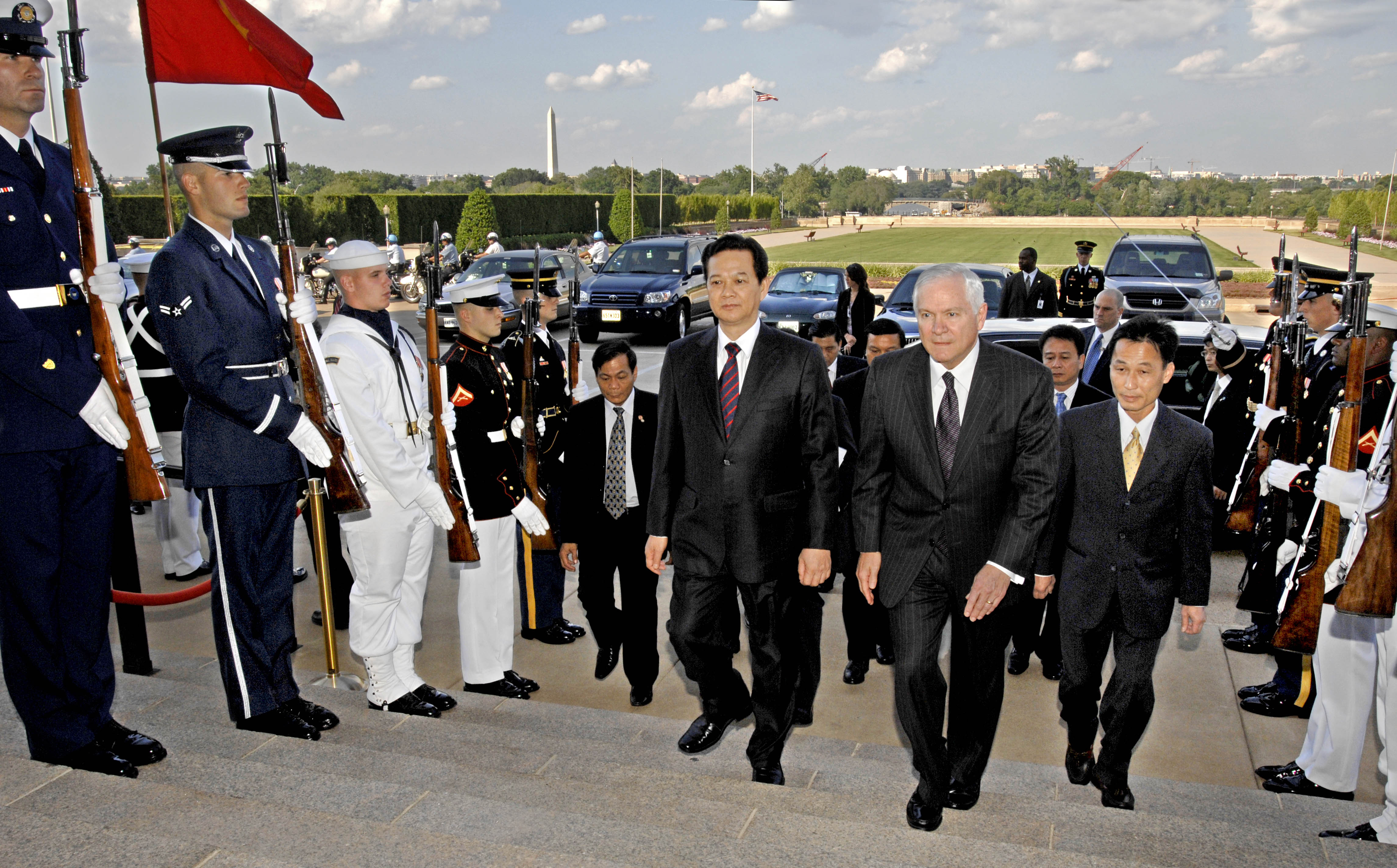

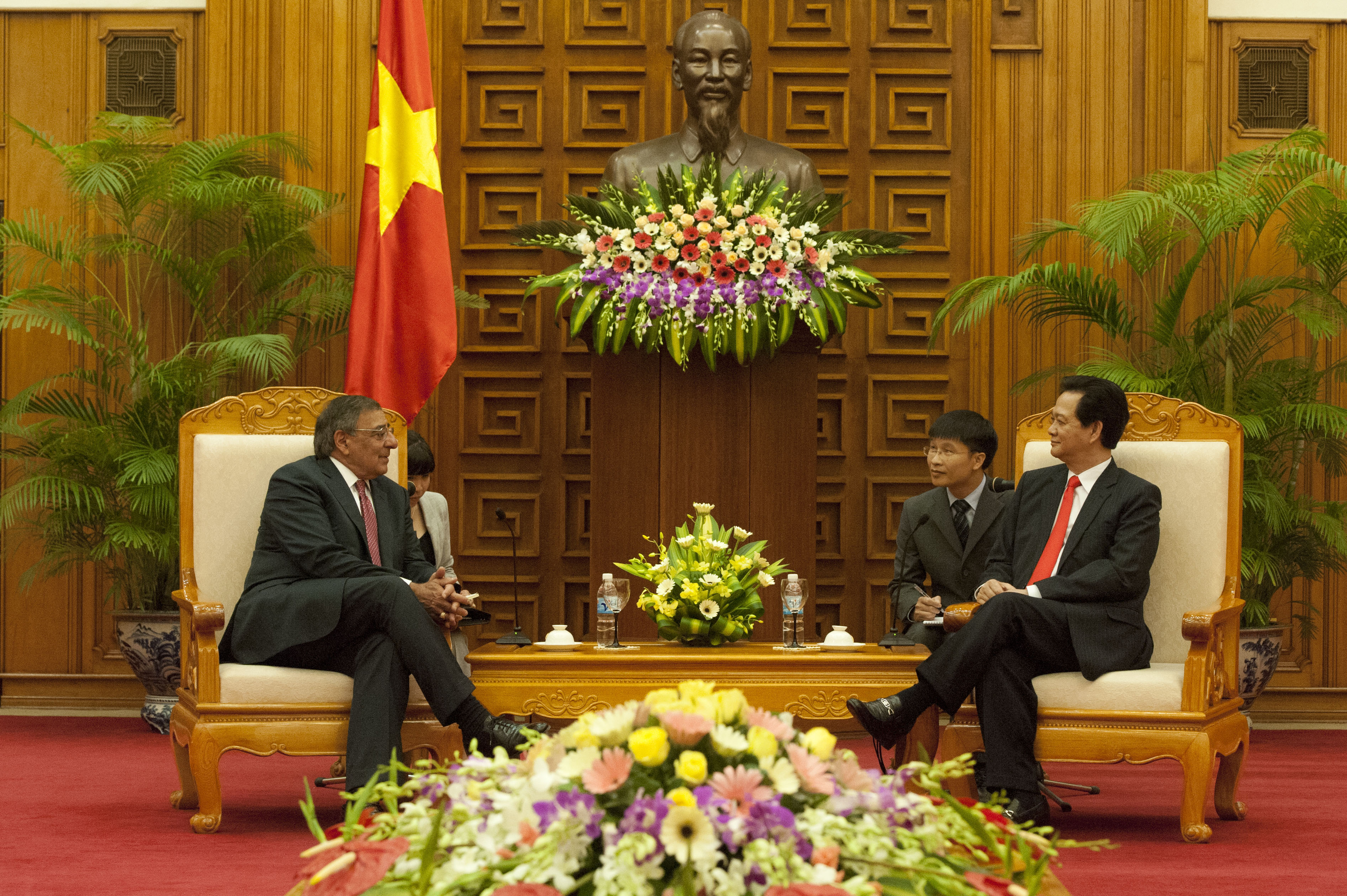

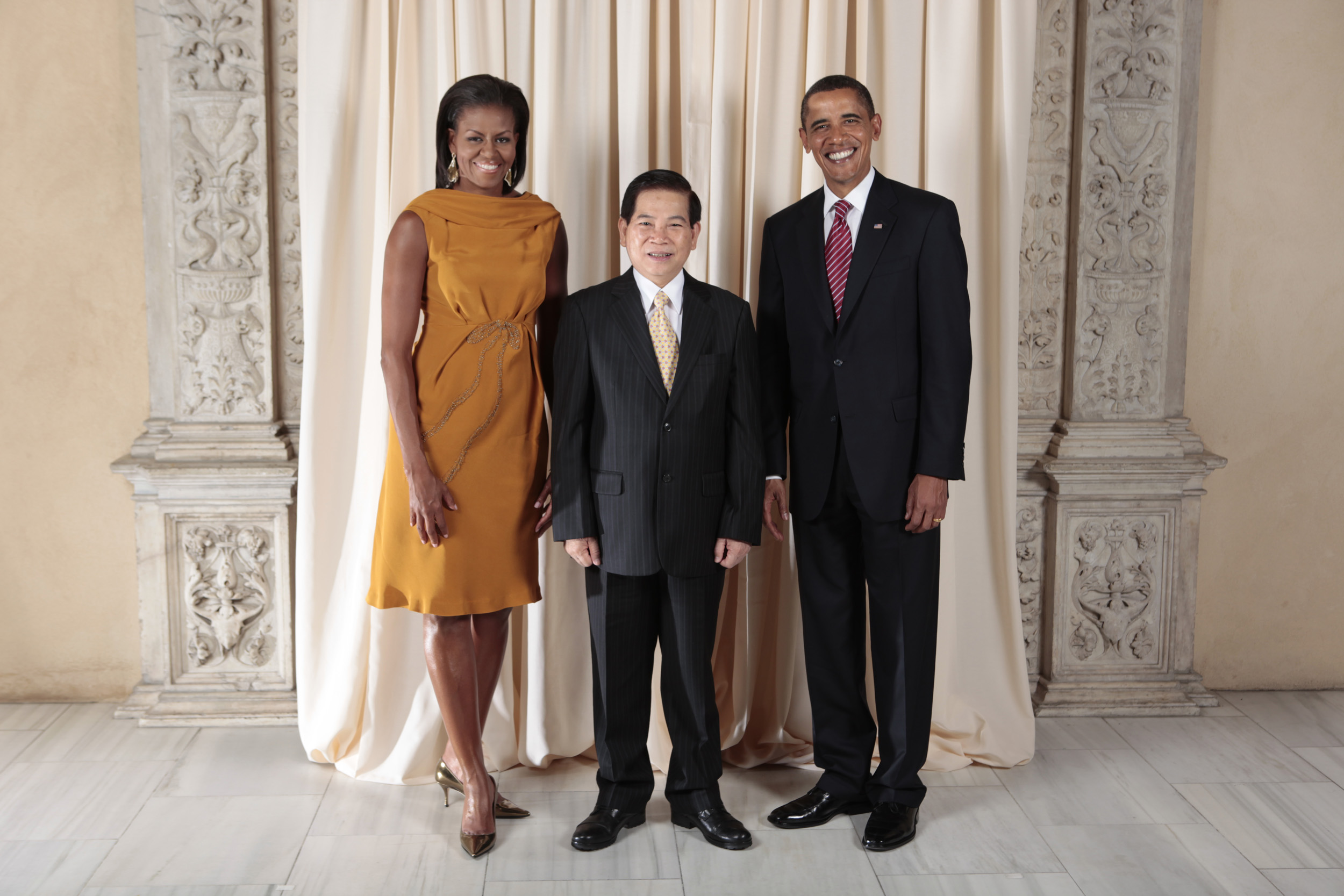

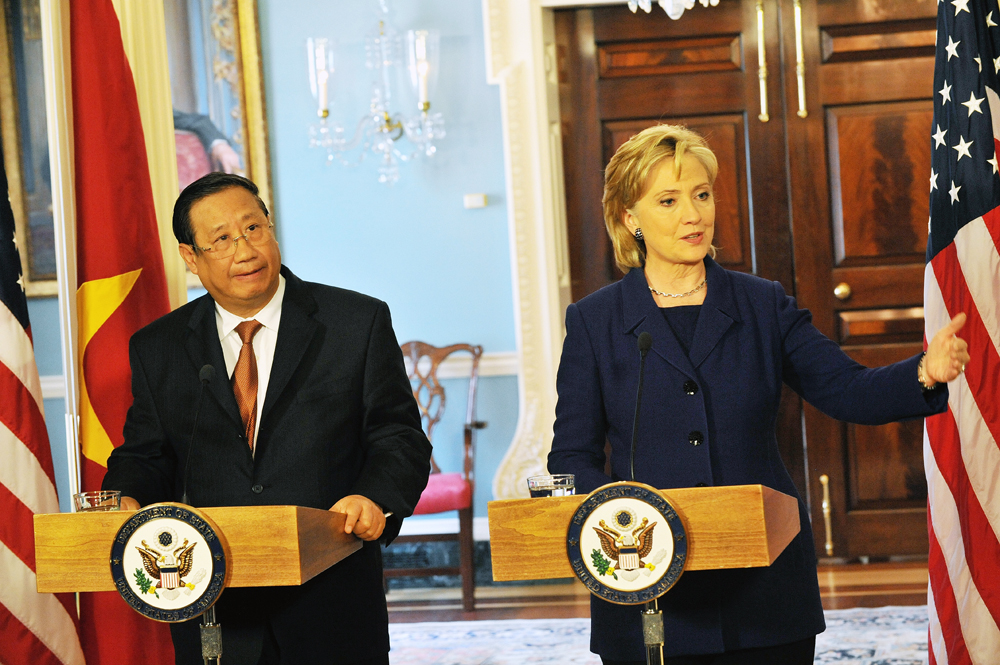

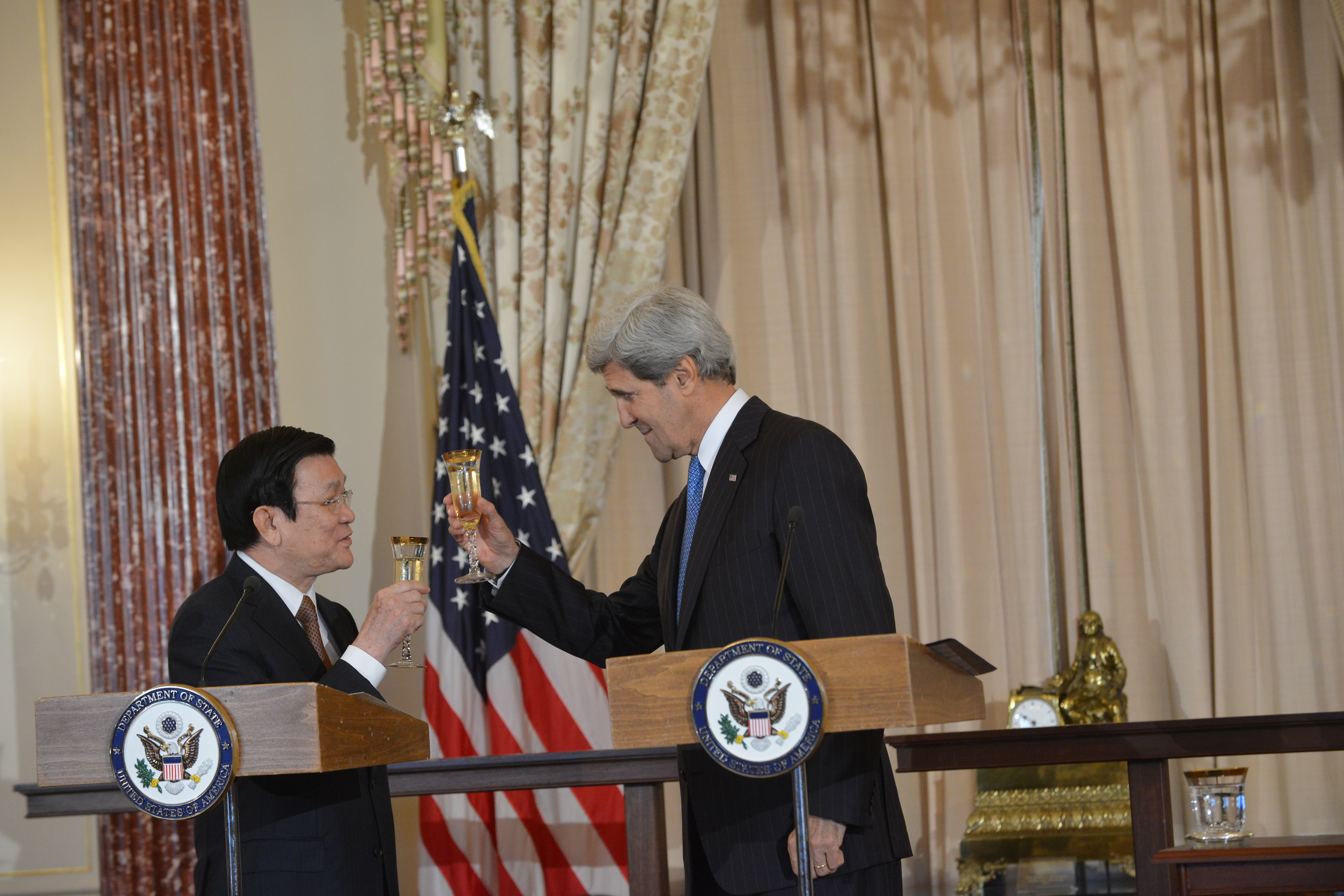

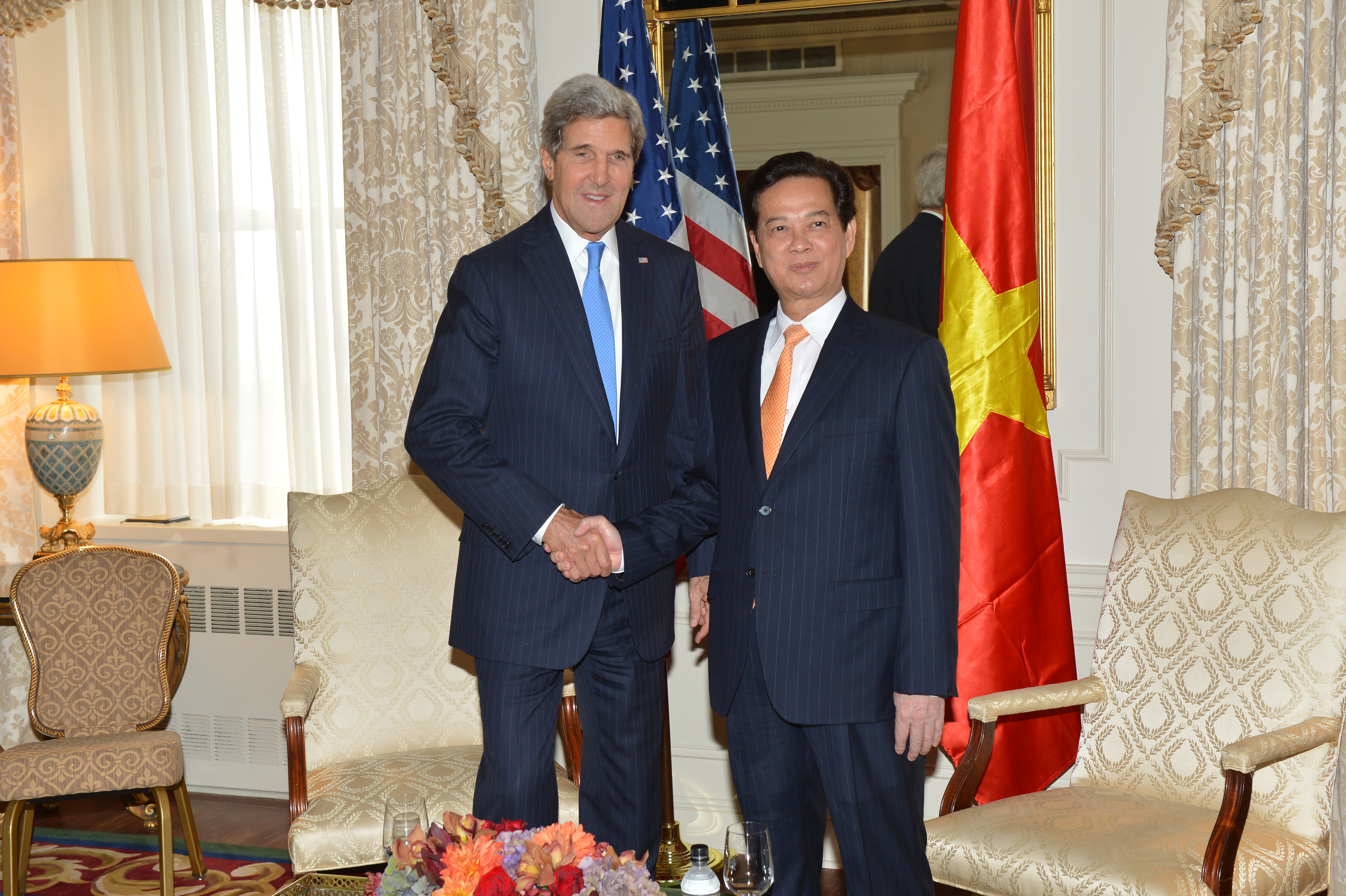

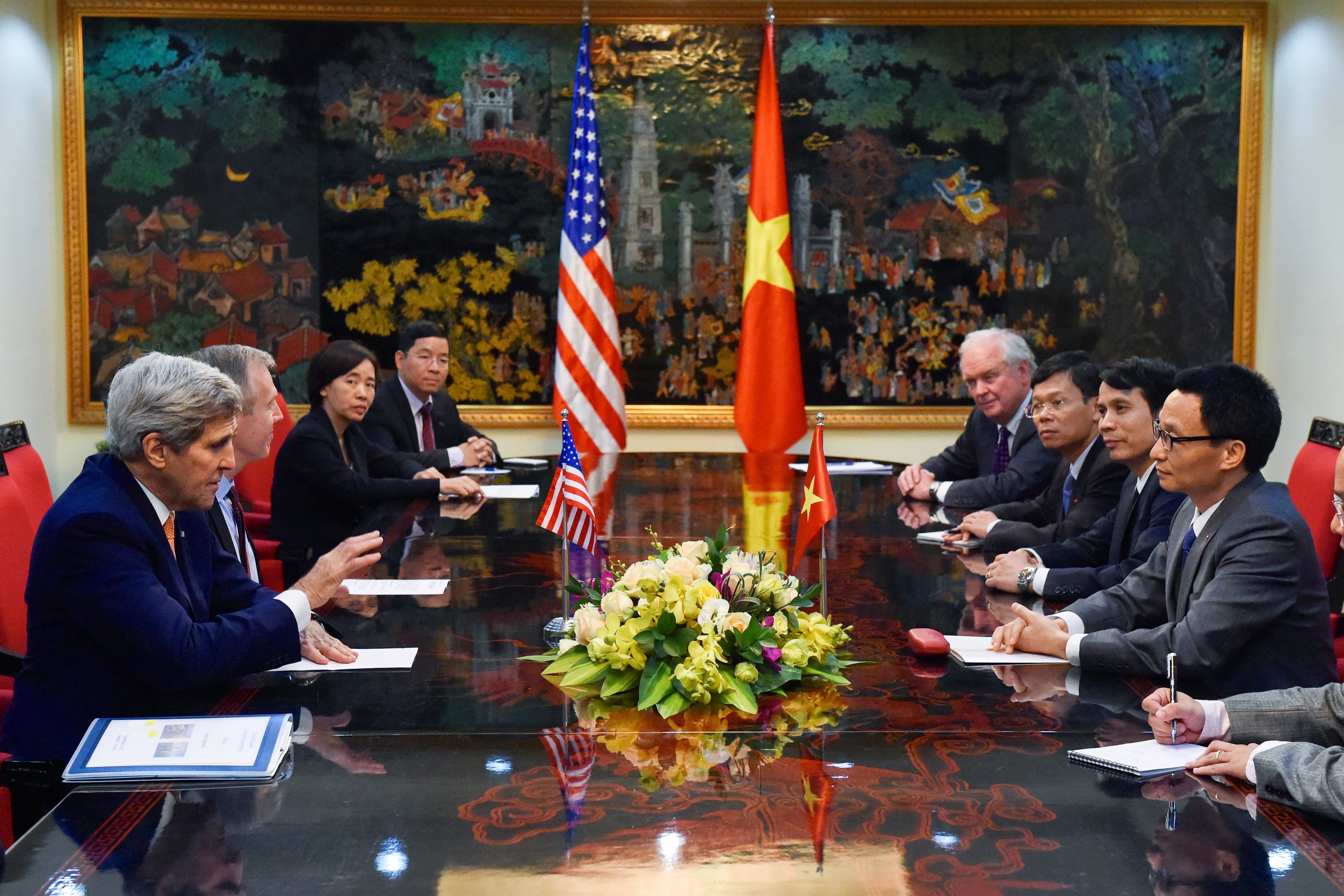

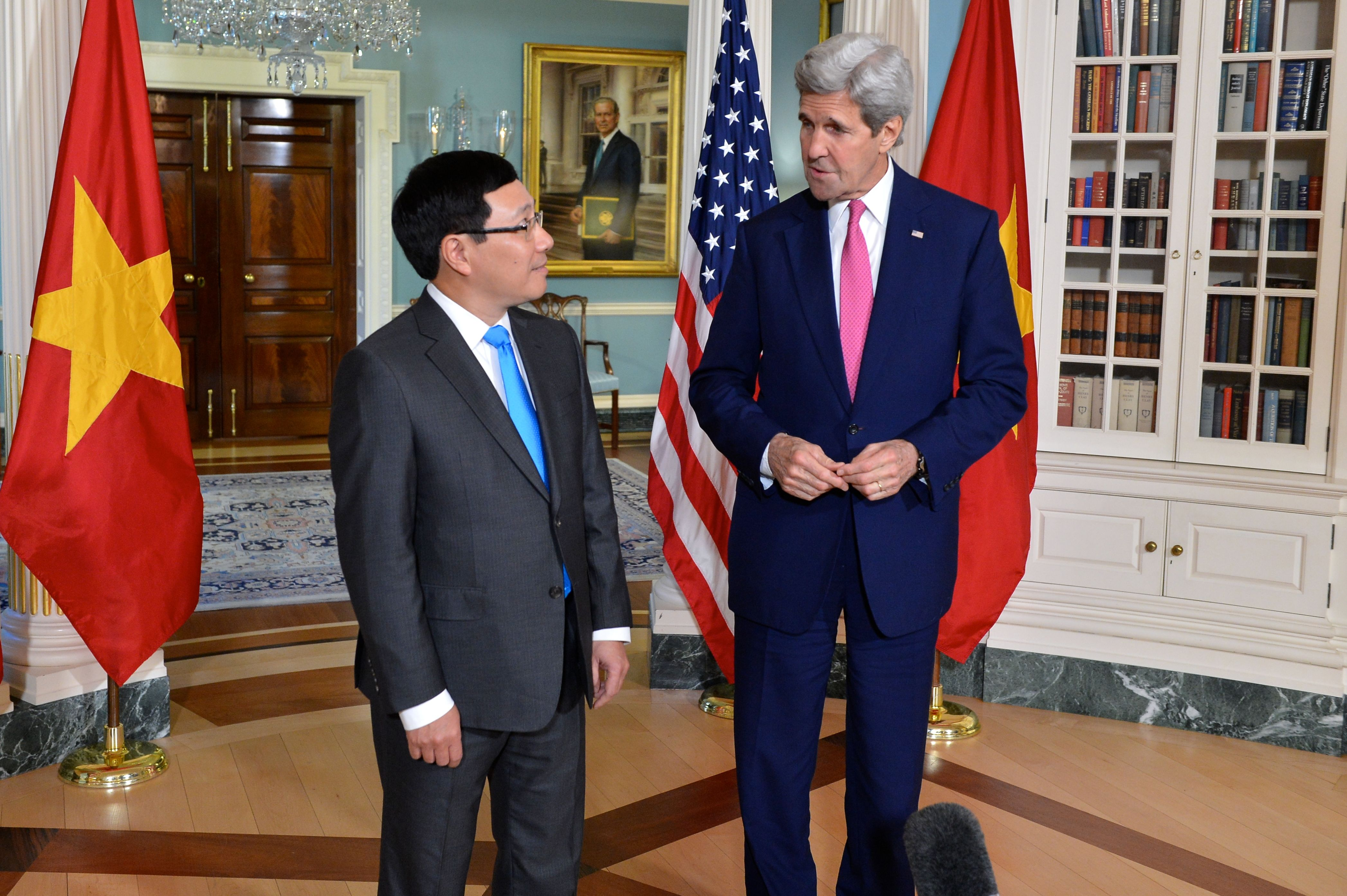

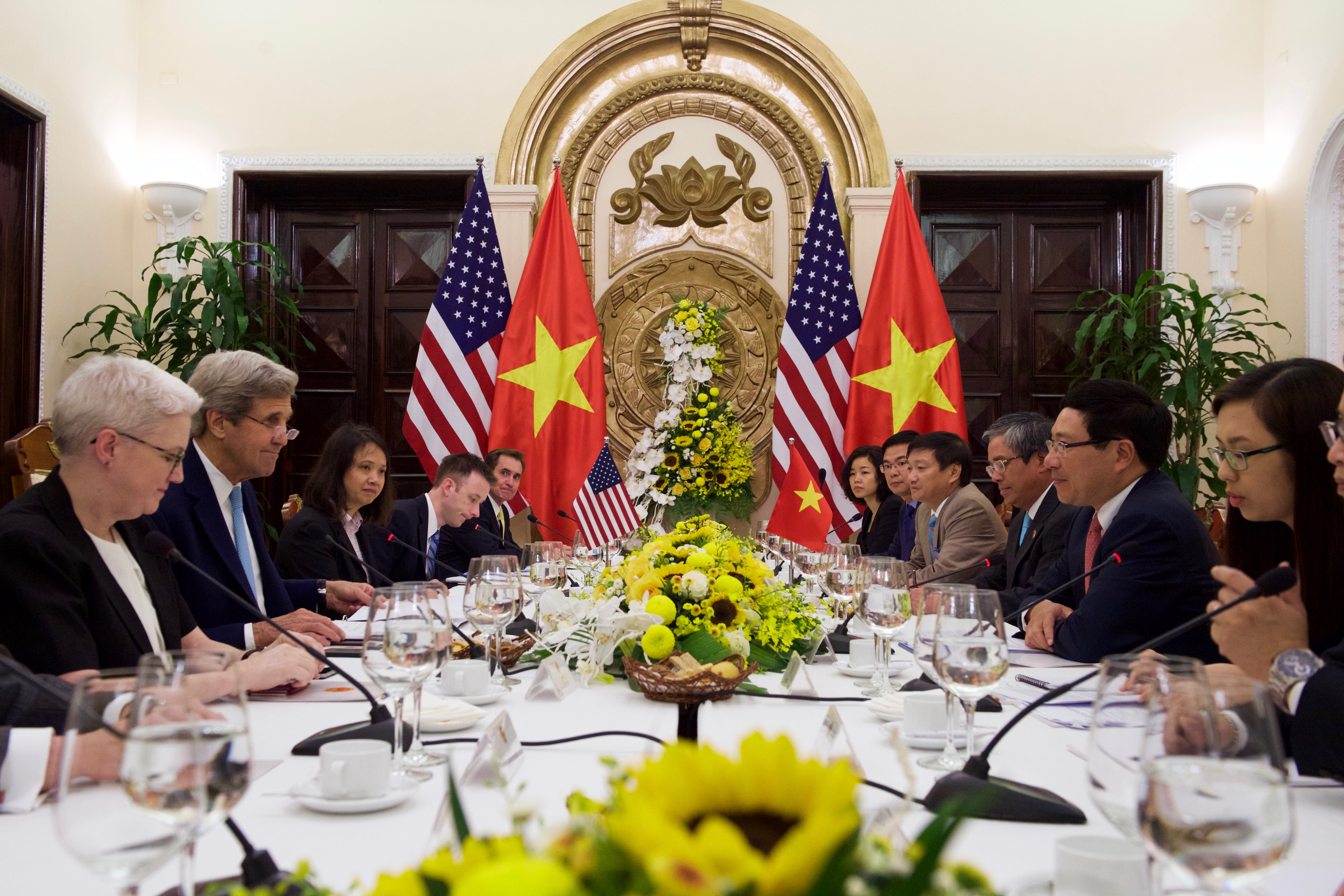

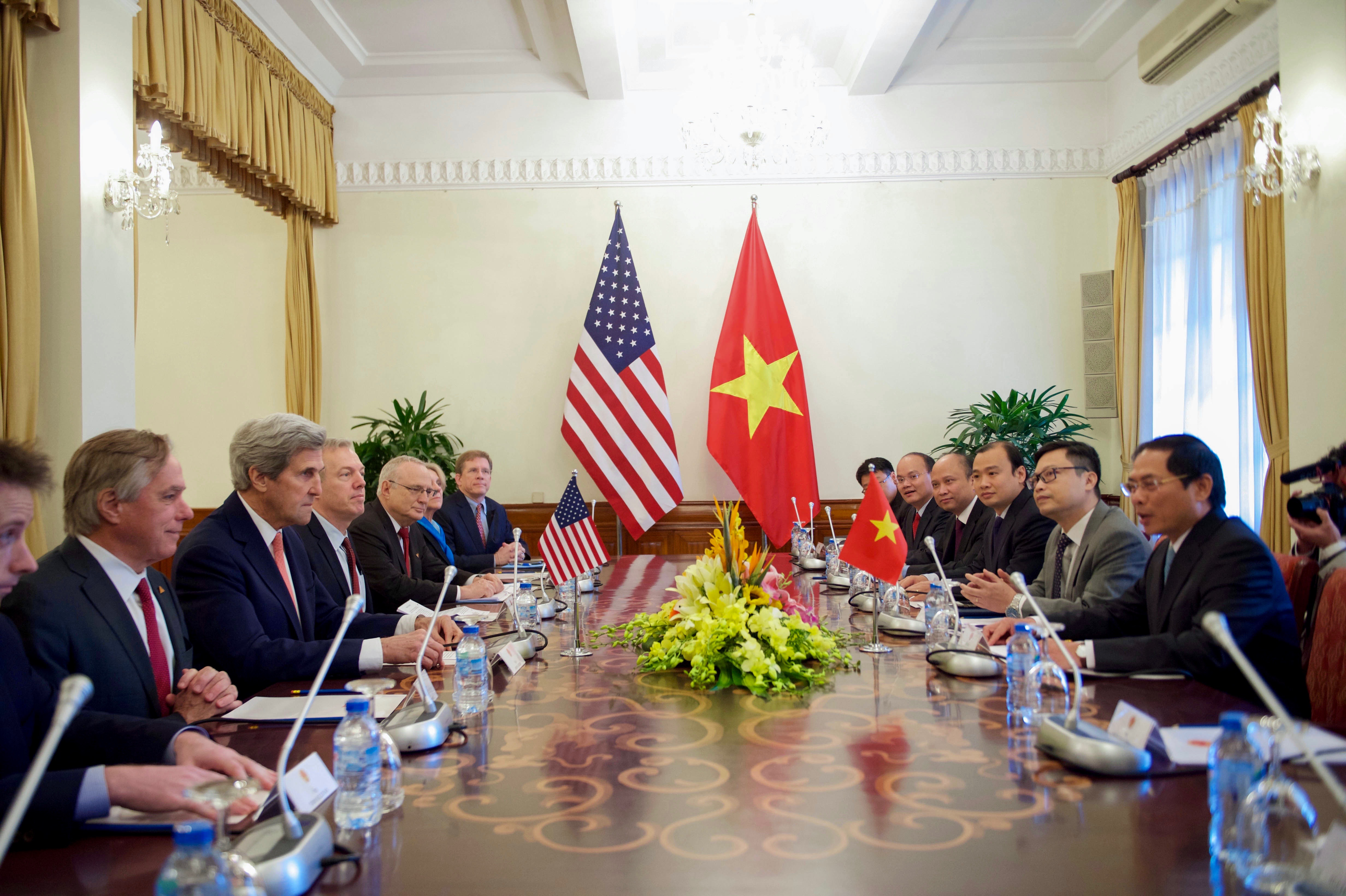

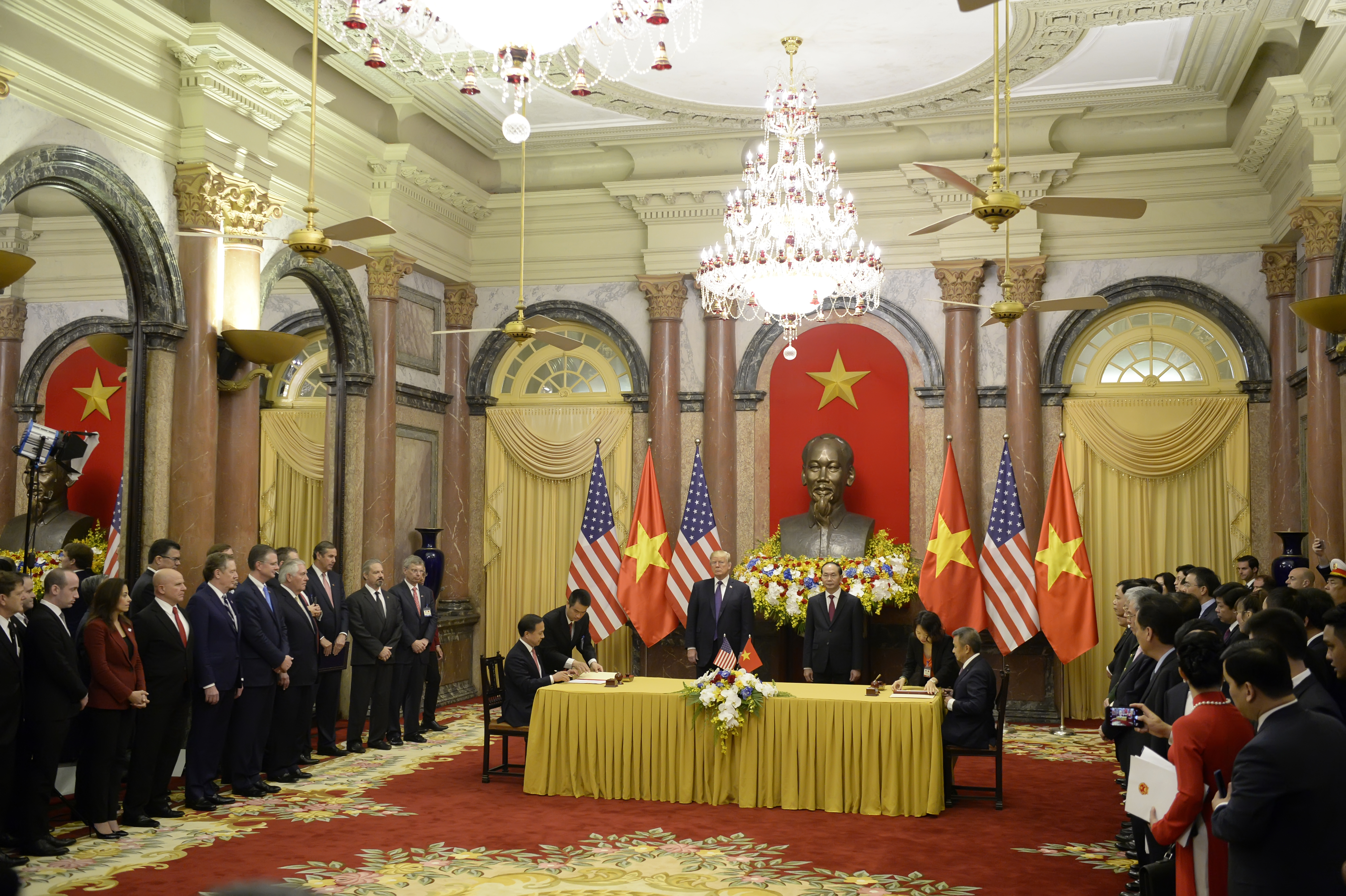

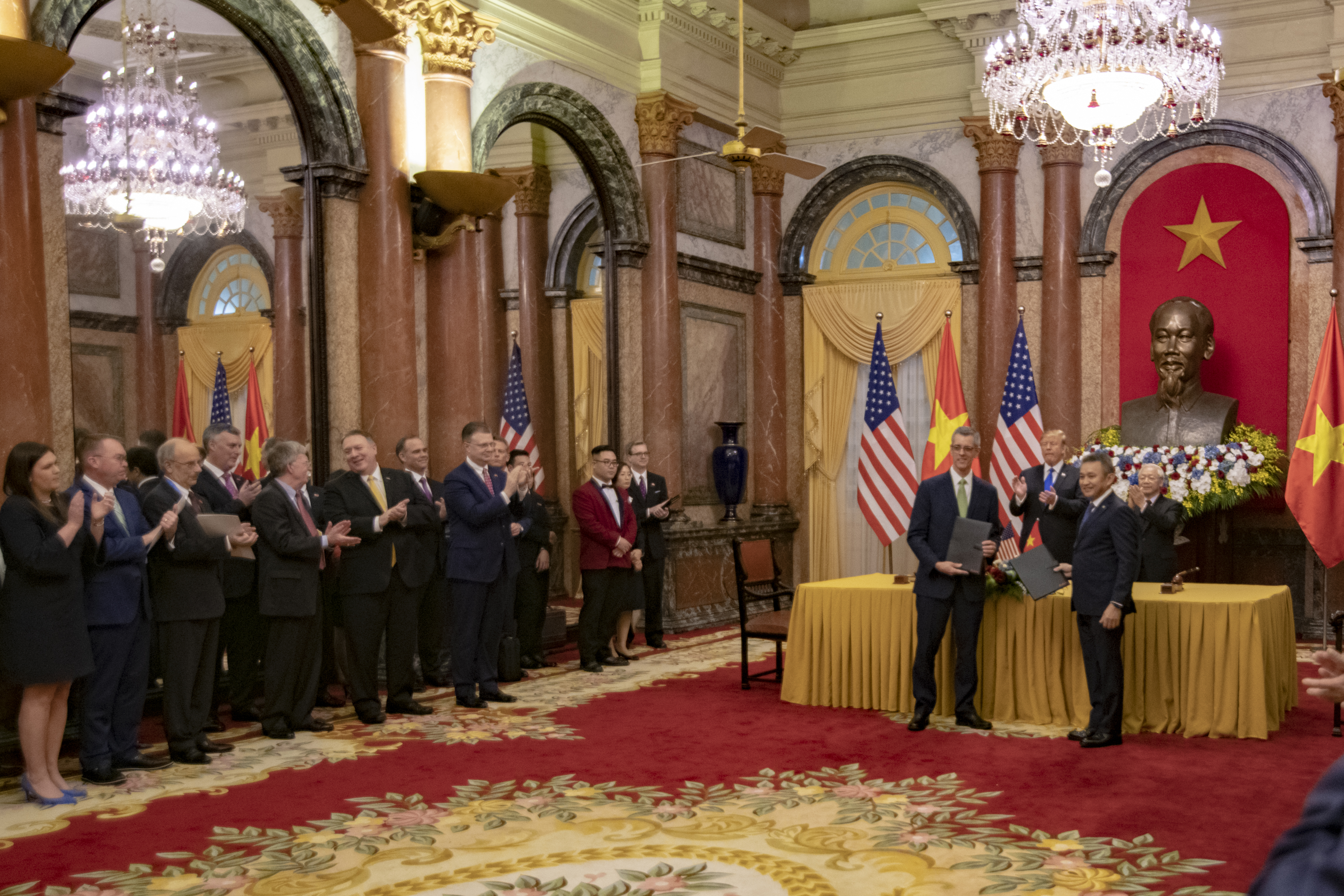

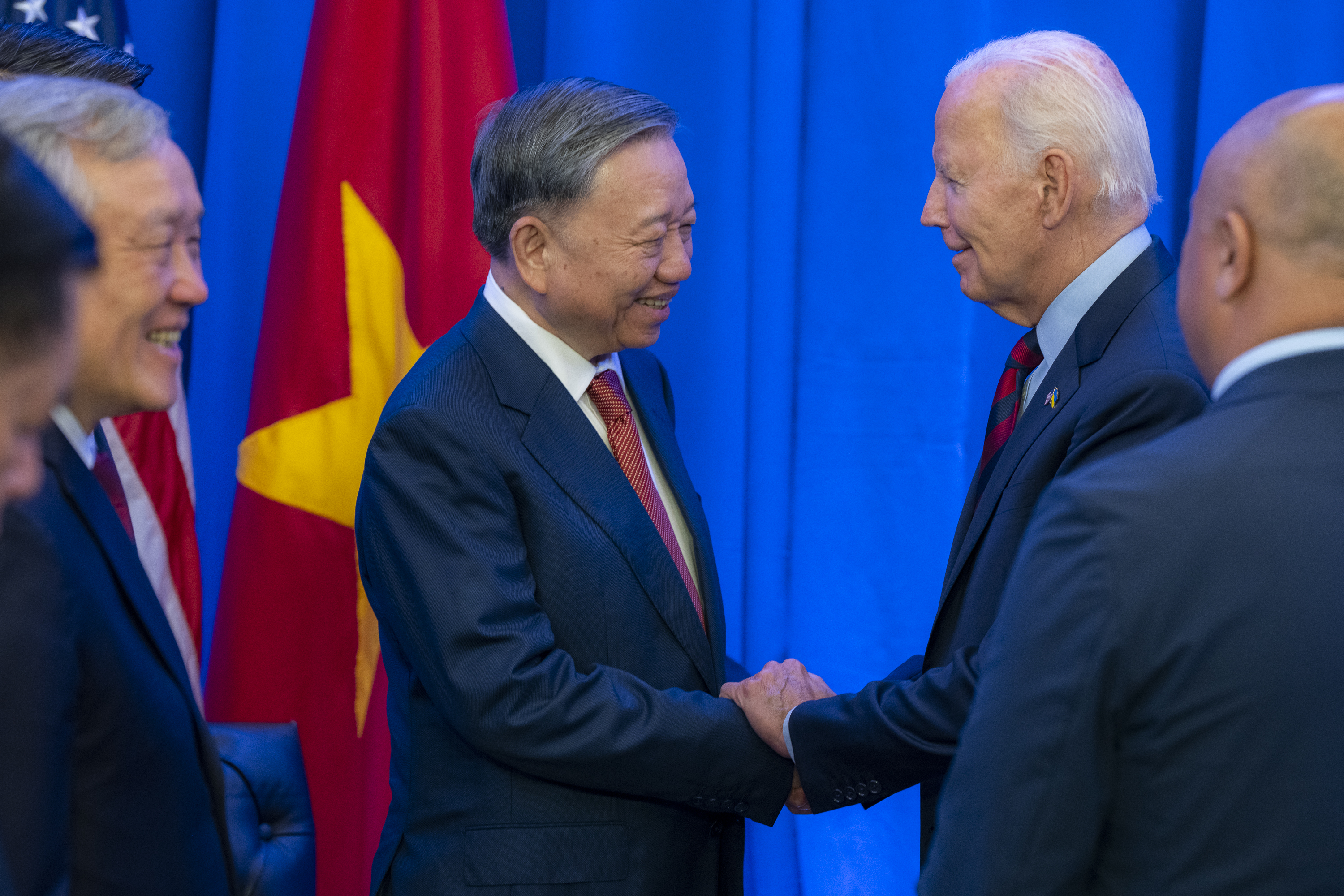

== Yemen ==
Table of Trips
Start	End	Guest	Title	Reason
January 23, 1990	January 26, 1990	Ali Abdullah Saleh	President	State Visit. Also visited New York City, San Francisco, and made a private visit to Dallas. Departed U.S. January 30.
April 2, 2000	April 4, 2000	Ali Abdullah Saleh	President	Working visit.
November 25, 2001	November 27, 2001	Ali Abdullah Saleh	President	Working visit.
June 7, 2004	June 11, 2004	Ali Abdullah Saleh	President	Working visit. Attended G-8 Economic Summit at Sea Island.
November 10, 2005	November 10, 2005	Ali Abdullah Saleh	President	Working visit.
April 29, 2007	May 2, 2007	Ali Abdullah Saleh	President	Working visit.
July 29, 2013	August 1, 2013	Abd Rabbuh Mansur Hadi	President	Working visit.

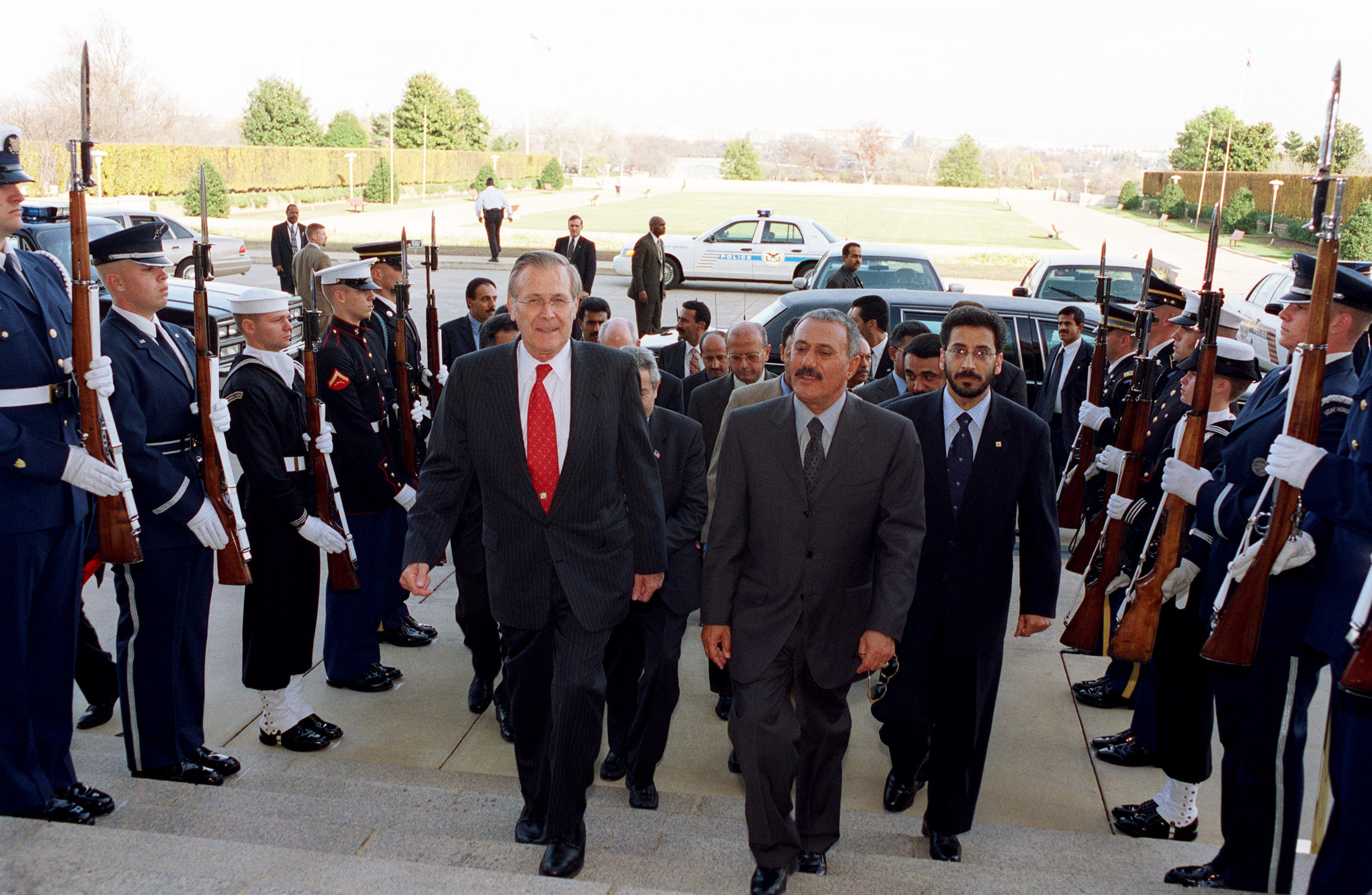

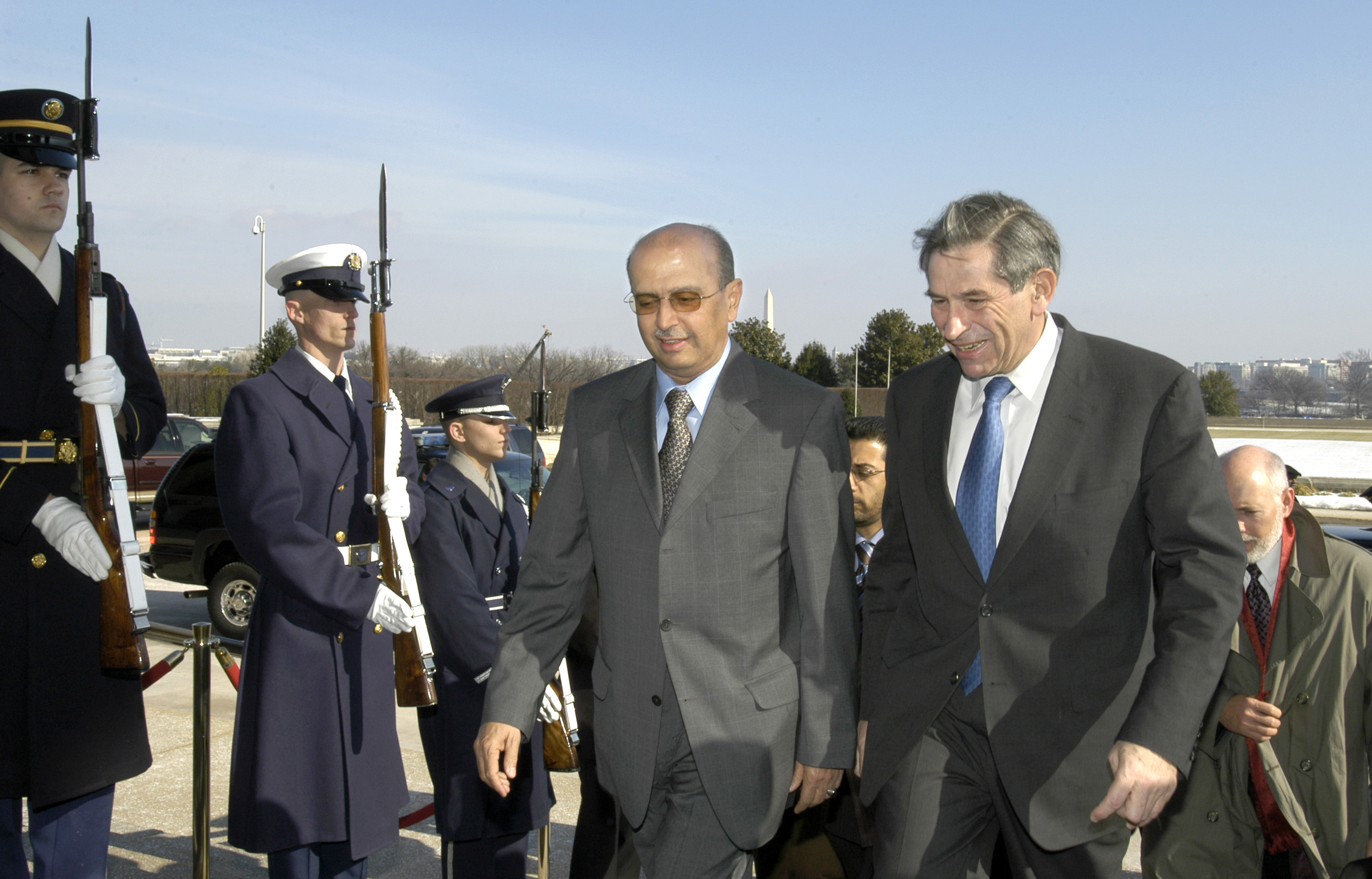

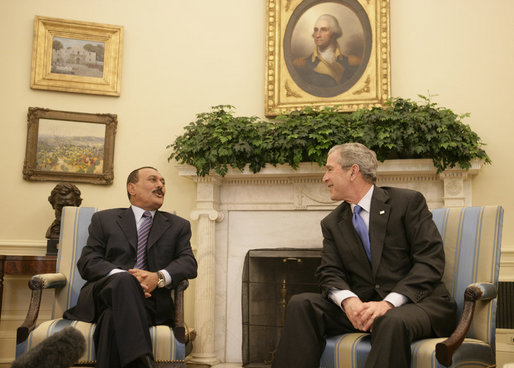

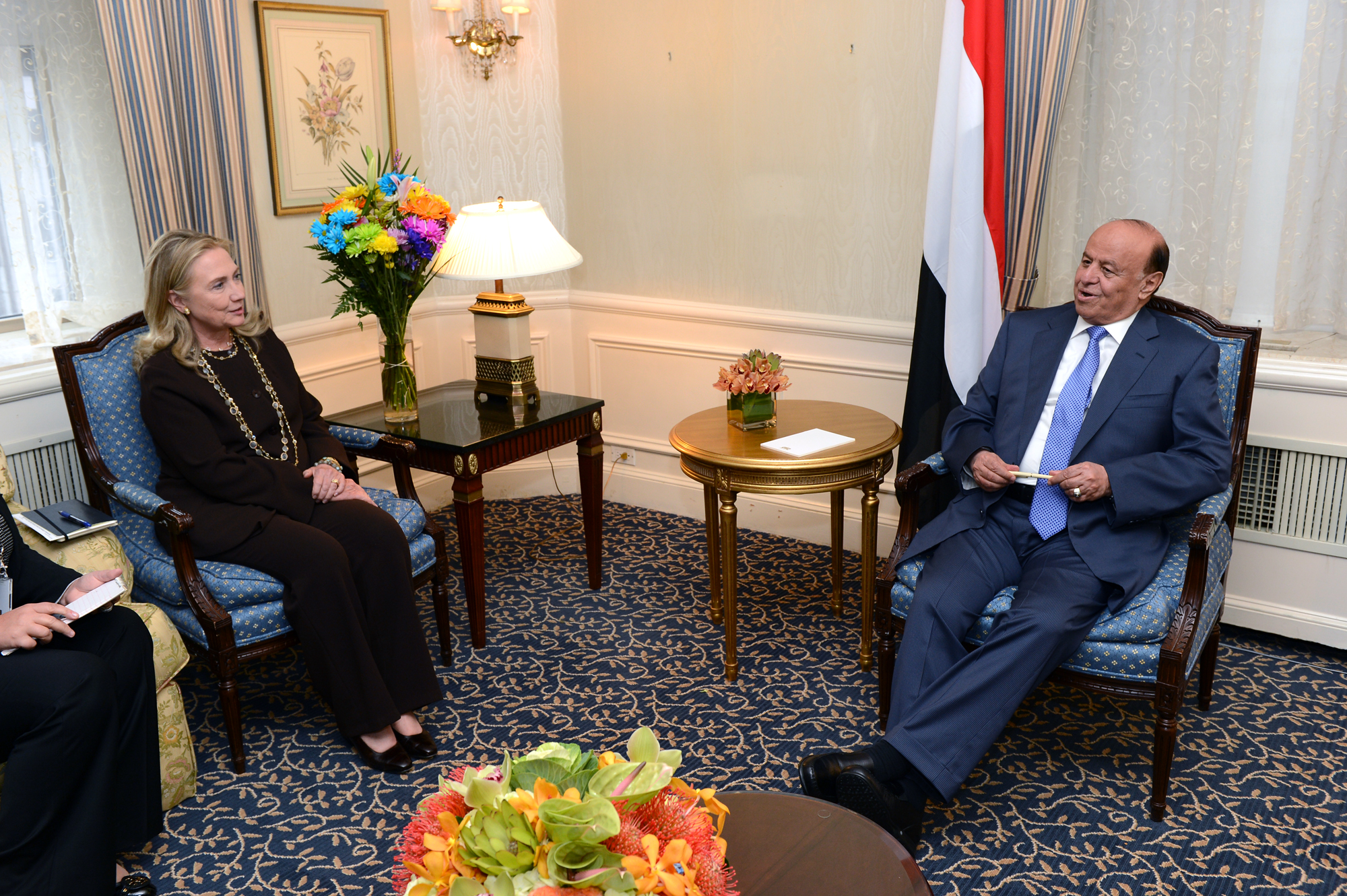

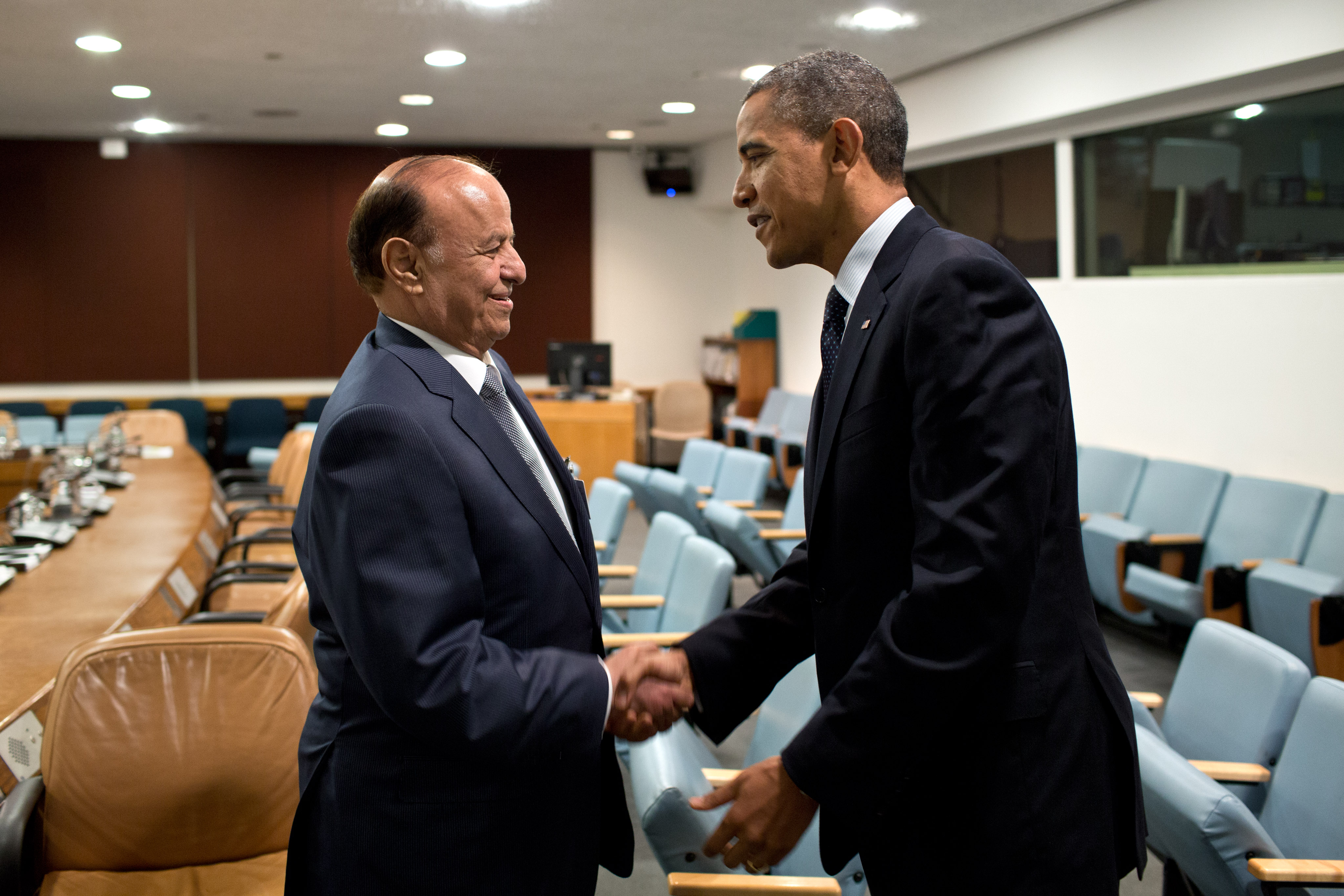

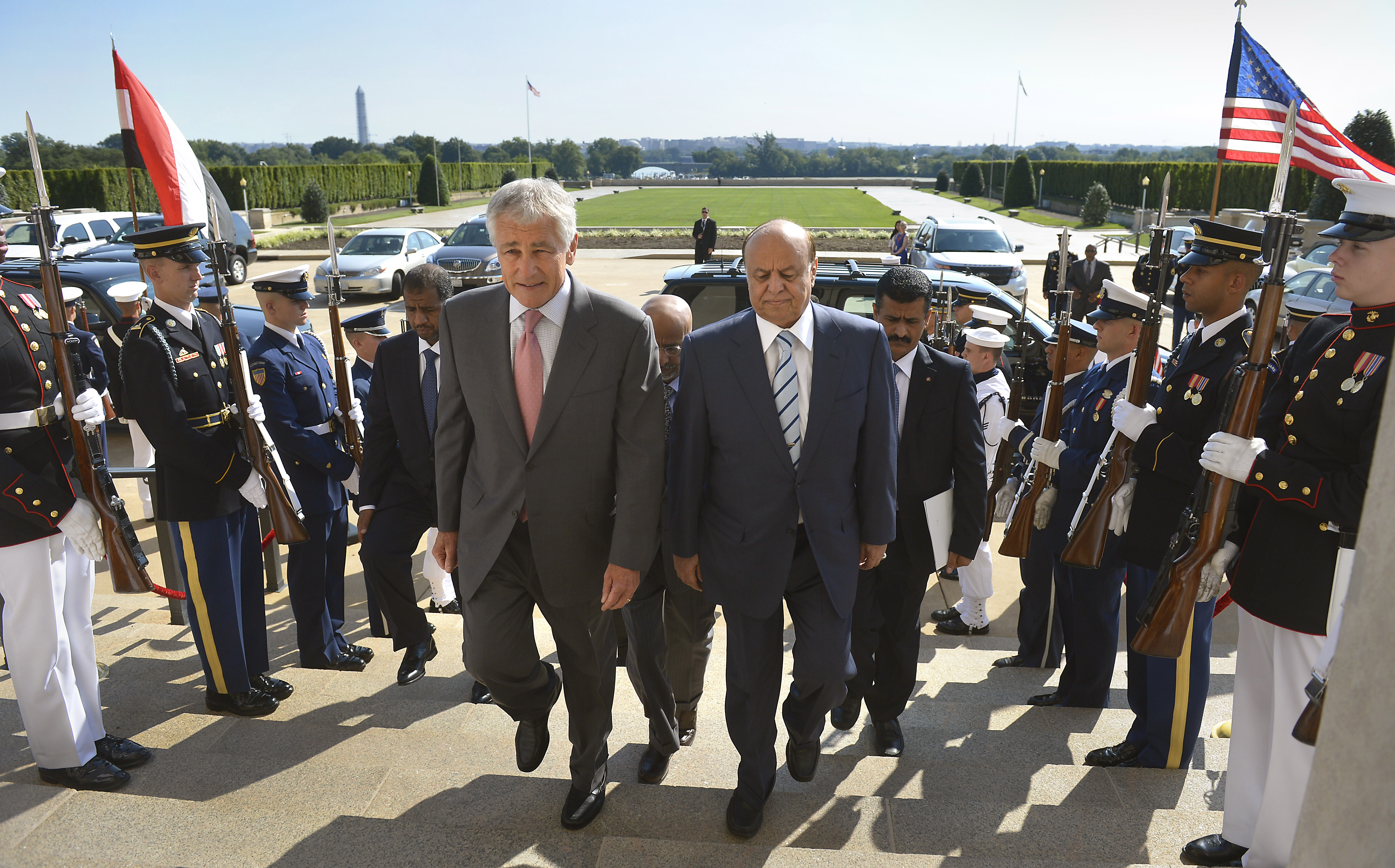

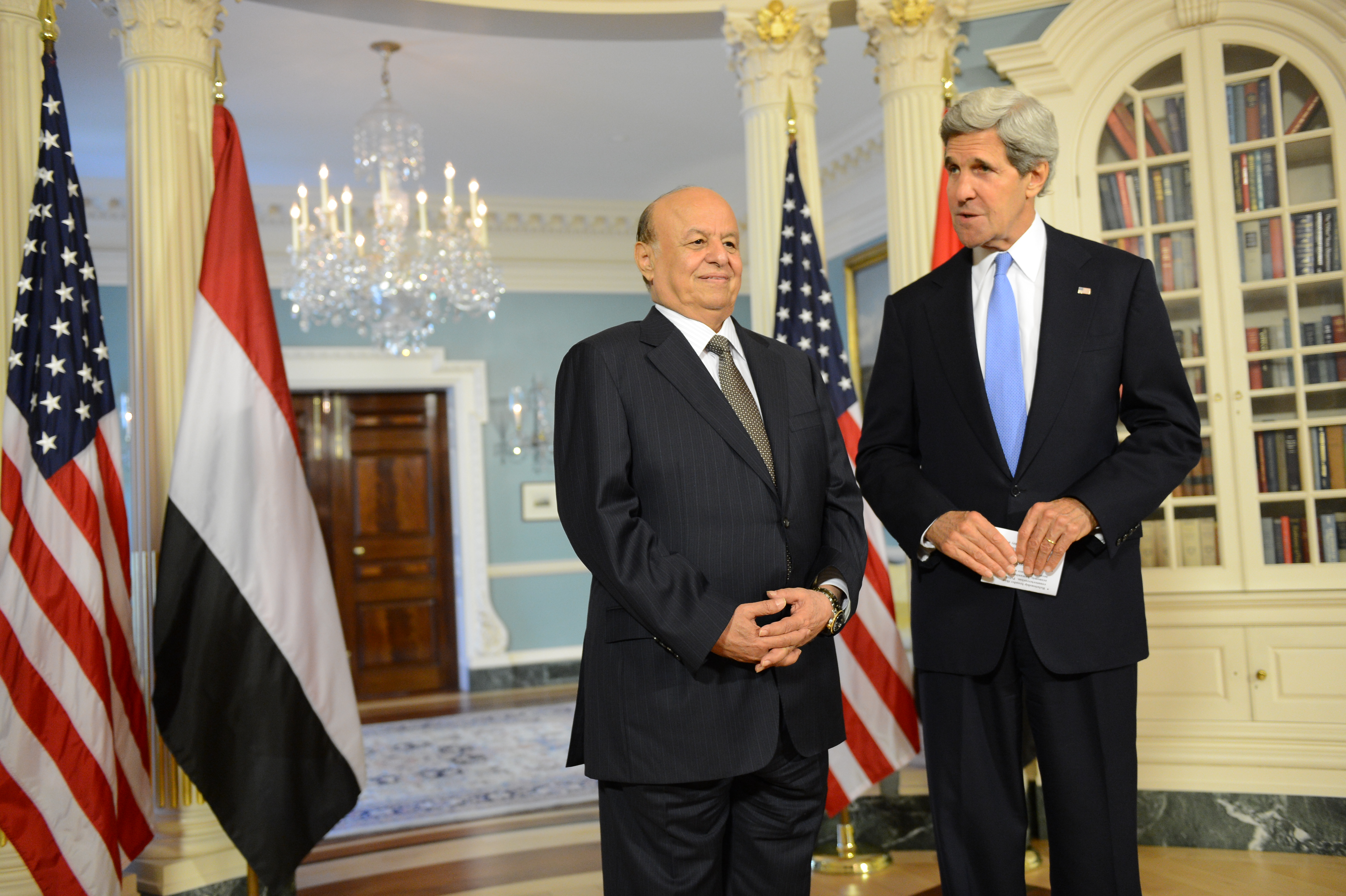

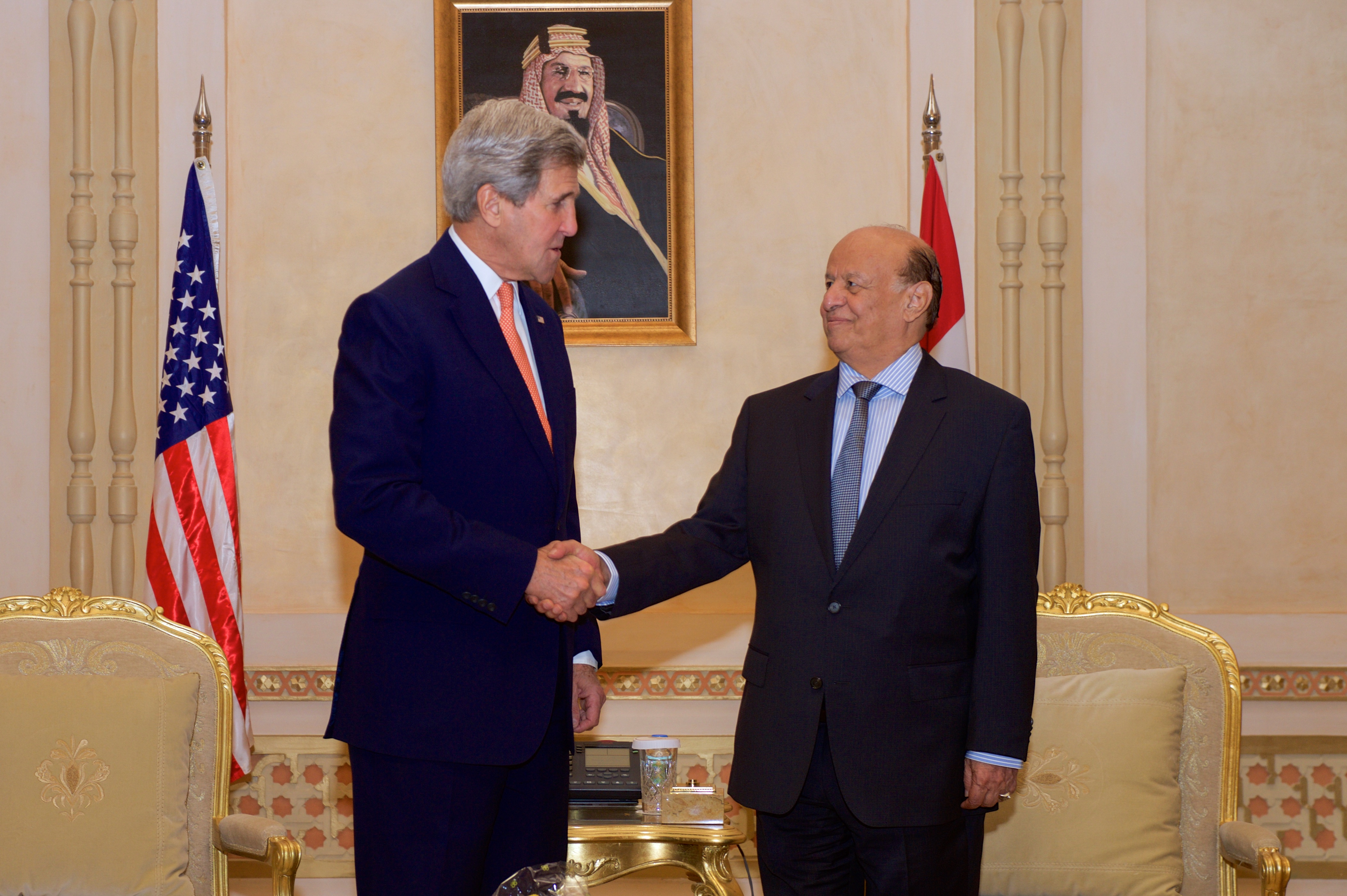

== See also ==
- Foreign policy of the United States
- Foreign relations of the United States
- List of international trips made by presidents of the United States
- List of diplomatic visits to the United States
- State visit
