= 2011 Miami Dolphins season =

46th season in franchise history

- General manager: Jeff Ireland
- Head coach: Tony Sparano (fired on December 12; 4–9 record); Todd Bowles (interim; 2–1 record)
- Home stadium: Sun Life Stadium

Results
- Record: 6–10
- Division place: 3rd AFC East
- Playoffs: Did not qualify
- Pro Bowlers: T Jake Long; WR Brandon Marshall; DT Paul Soliai

The 2011 season was the Miami Dolphins' 42nd in the National Football League (NFL), their 46th overall, and their fourth and final season under head coach Tony Sparano. The Dolphins made their first-round selection with the 15th pick of the 2011 NFL draft on Florida center Mike Pouncey. The team lost each of their first seven games but went 6–3 in their final nine to finish with an overall 6–10 record. However, this result failed to improve on their record from 2010, and Sparano was fired on December 12. Assistant head coach and secondary coach Todd Bowles served as interim head coach for the final three games.

== Offseason ==
=== 2011 NFL draft ===
DraftKing.com, NFLMocks.com, and The Palm Beach Post predicted that the Dolphins would use their first round pick to choose Gabe Carimi, a left tackle for the Wisconsin Badgers who won the 2010 Outland Trophy as the nation's top collegiate interior lineman, and was a Consensus All-American. Charles Davis of NFL.com predicted they would draft Mark Ingram II from the University of Alabama.

2011 Miami Dolphins draft
Round	Pick	Player	Position	College	Notes
1	15	Mike Pouncey *	C	Florida	
2	62	Daniel Thomas	RB	Kansas State	Pick from DEN (Note: The Dolphins traded its second-round selection (#46 overall) and a 2010 second-round selection to the Denver Broncos in exchange for WR Brandon Marshall.) (Note: The Dolphins traded its third-round selection (#79 overall), fifth-round selection (#146 overall) and a seventh-round selection (#217 overall) to the Washington Redskins in exchange for a second-round selection (#62 overall).)
4	111	Edmond Gates	WR	Abilene Christian	
6	174	Charles Clay	FB/TE	Tulsa	Pick from GB (Note: The Dolphins traded its sixth-round selection (#179 overall) and seventh-round selection (#218 overall) to the Green Bay Packers for their sixth-round selection (#174 overall) and seventh-round selection (#231 overall).)
7	231	Frank Kearse	DT	Alabama A&M	Pick from JAC (Note: The Dolphins acquired this seventh-round selection (#218 overall) in a May 2010 trade that sent G Justin Smiley to the Jacksonville Jaguars.)
7	235	Jimmy Wilson	CB	Montana	Compensatory (Note: Compensatory selection)
Made roster † Pro Football Hall of Fame * Made at least one Pro Bowl during career

=== Personnel changes ===
Brian Daboll joined the team as offensive coordinator. Karl Dorrell moved to quarterbacks coach from wide receivers coach. Jeff Nixon wasadded as the running backs coach. Steve Bush moved to wide receivers coach from offensive quality control. Ike Hilliard was added as an assistant wide receivers coach. Dan Campbell moved to tight ends coach from intern. Bryan Cox was added as a defensive pass rush coach.

=== Roster changes ===
==== Re-signings ====
- March 4 — Re-signed guard Richie Incognito three years
- July 30 — Re-signed defensive end Tony McDaniel two years
- August 5 — Re-signed offensive tackle Nate Garner, running back Lex Hilliard, offensive tackle Lydon Murtha, running back Kory Sheets

==== Signings ====
- July 26 — Signed quarterback Pat Devlin
- July 29 — Signed linebacker Kevin Burnett
- July 30 — Signed linebacker Jason Trusnik, quarterback Matt Moore
- July 31 — Signed defensive end Ronald Fields
- August 1 — Signed offensive tackle Marc Colombo
- August 2 — Signed linebacker Jason Taylor
- August 5 — Signed quarterback Kevin O'Connell
- August 6 — Signed offensive tackle Ray Willis
- August 9 — Signed linebacker David Nixon, cornerback K.J. Gerard
- August 15 — Signed wide receiver John Matthews, linebacker Marvin Mitchell
- August 22 — Signed guard Tyler Donohue
- August 23 — Signed running back Larry Johnson
- August 29 — Signed safety Gerald Alexander
- September 4 — Signed tight end Will Yeatman
- September 5 — Signed tight end Dante Rosario and center/guard Ryan Cook
- September 8 — Signed running back Larry Johnson
- September 14 — Signed cornerback Will Allen
- September 20 — Signed defensive end Igor Olshansky and cornerback Nate Jones
- September 28 — Signed running back Steve Slaton
- October 6 — Signed quarterback Sage Rosenfels

==== Departures ====
- July 29 — UFA quarterback Tyler Thigpen, UFA quarterback Chad Pennington
- August 2 — UFA running back Ronnie Brown, Released linebacker Channing Crowder
- August 3 — Terminated the contract of linebacker Tim Dobbins
- August 8 — UFA running back Ricky Williams
- August 15 — Waived wide receiver Brooks Foster
- August 23 — Waived running back Kory Sheets
- August 26 — Waived corner back K.J. Gerard, defensive tackle Johnny Jones, corner back Jose Perez
- August 27 — Waived/Injured linebacker Mike Rivera
- August 30 — Waived tackle Tyler Donahue
- September 2 — Waived tight end Dedrick Epps and wide receiver John Matthews. Terminated contract of safety Gerald Alexander.
- September 3 — Waived quarterback Kevin O'Connell, safety Mark Restelli, cornerback Vincent Agnew, tight end Brett Brackett, wide receiver Patrick Carter, guard Garrett Chisolm, quarterback Pat Devlin, linebacker Jonathan Freeny, running back Nic Grigsby, tackle D.J. Jones, tackle Matt Kopa, wide receiver Phillip Livas, cornerback Nate Ness, linebacker David Nixon, wide receiver Julius Pruitt, linebacker Robert Rose, tight end Mickey Shuler, and linebacker Quinton Spears. Terminated contracts with corner back Will Allen, nose tackle Ronald Fields, running back Larry Johnson, full back Lousaka Polite, and tackle Ray Willis.
- September 4 — Waived defensive tackle Frank Kearse
- September 5 — Released linebacker A.J. Edds and terminated the contract of center Joe Berger
- September 8 — Waived guard Ray Feinga
- September 13 — Terminated the contract of corner back Benny Sapp
- September 20 — Terminated the contracts of running back Larry Johnson and tight end Dante Rosario
- September 28 — Cut defensive end Ryan Baker

==== Trades ====
- July 29 — Traded reserve safety Jonathon Amaya and an exchange of undisclosed draft picks for running back Reggie Bush

=== Team captains ===
The team voted the following as their 2011 team captains.

Offense

- Chad Henne
- Jake Long

Defense

- Yeremiah Bell
- Karlos Dansby

Special teams

Head coach Tony Sparano decided that the special teams captain would be selected on week to week basis.

== Staff ==
Miami Dolphins 2011 staff
Front office: Chairman/managing general partner – Stephen Ross; Vice chairman/partner – Jorge Perez; Vice chairman – Don Shula; CEO – Mike Dee; General manager – Jeff Ireland; Senior vice president of football operations – Dawn Aponte; Director of player personnel – Brian Gaine; Director of college scouting – Chris Grier; Assistant director of pro scouting – Chris Shea; Head coaches: Interim head coach/secondary – Todd Bowles; Offensive coaches: Offensive coordinator – Brian Daboll; Quarterbacks – Karl Dorrell; Running backs – Jeff Nixon; Wide receivers – Steve Bush; Assistant wide receivers – Ike Hilliard; Tight ends – Dan Campbell; Offensive line – Dave DeGuglielmo; Offensive quality control – Tony Sparano, Jr.	Defensive coaches: Defensive coordinator – Mike Nolan; Defensive line – Kacy Rodgers; Pass rush – Bryan Cox; Linebackers – Bill Sheridan; Assistant linebackers – David Corrao; Assistant secondary – Joe Danna; Special teams coaches: Special teams coordinator – Darren Rizzi; Assistant special teams – Dave Fipp; Strength and conditioning: Head strength and conditioning – Darren Krein; Assistant strength and conditioning – David Puloka

== Final roster ==
2011 Miami Dolphins roster
Quarterbacks (QB): 9 Pat Devlin; 6 J. P. Losman; 8 Matt Moore; Running backs (RB): 22 Reggie Bush; 31 Charles Clay FB; 26 Lex Hilliard FB; 38 Richard Medlin; 23 Steve Slaton; 33 Daniel Thomas; Wide receivers (WR): 15 Davone Bess PR; 10 Clyde Gates KR; 82 Brian Hartline; 19 Brandon Marshall; 11 Julius Pruitt; Tight ends (TE): 80 Anthony Fasano; 88 Jeron Mastrud; 89 Will Yeatman	Offensive linemen (OL): 61 Will Barker T; 72 Vernon Carey G; 71 Marc Colombo T; 62 Ryan Cook G; 69 Ray Feinga G; 75 Nate Garner G/T; 68 Richie Incognito G; 74 John Jerry G/T; 51 Mike Pouncey C; Defensive linemen (DL): 90 Ryan Baker DE; 70 Kendall Langford DE; 78 Tony McDaniel NT; 97 Phillip Merling DE; 98 Jared Odrick DE; 94 Randy Starks DE; 96 Paul Soliai NT	Linebackers (LB): 59 Ikaika Alama-Francis OLB; 56 Kevin Burnett ILB; 58 Karlos Dansby ILB; 50 Marvin Mitchell ILB; 53 Austin Spitler ILB; 99 Jason Taylor OLB; 93 Jason Trusnik OLB; 91 Cameron Wake OLB; Defensive backs (DB): 25 Will Allen CB; 37 Yeremiah Bell SS; 28 Nolan Carroll CB; 30 Chris Clemons FS; 29 Tyrone Culver S; 21 Vontae Davis CB; 20 Reshad Jones FS; 24 Sean Smith CB; 27 Jimmy Wilson CB; Special teams (ST): 5 Dan Carpenter K; 92 John Denney LS; 2 Brandon Fields P	Practice squad: 95 Isaako Aaitui NT; 43 Vince Agnew CB; 4 McLeod Bethel-Thompson QB; 32 Marcus Brown CB; 49 Jonathan Freeny LB; 81 Chris Hogan WR; 41 Ian Johnson RB; 40 Anderson Russell S; Reserve: 7 Chad Henne QB (IR); 77 Jake Long T (IR); 55 Koa Misi OLB (IR); 14 Marlon Moore WR (IR); 76 Lydon Murtha T (IR); 18 Roberto Wallace WR (IR); Rookies in italics 53 active, 6 reserve, 8 practice squad

== Schedule ==
=== Preseason ===
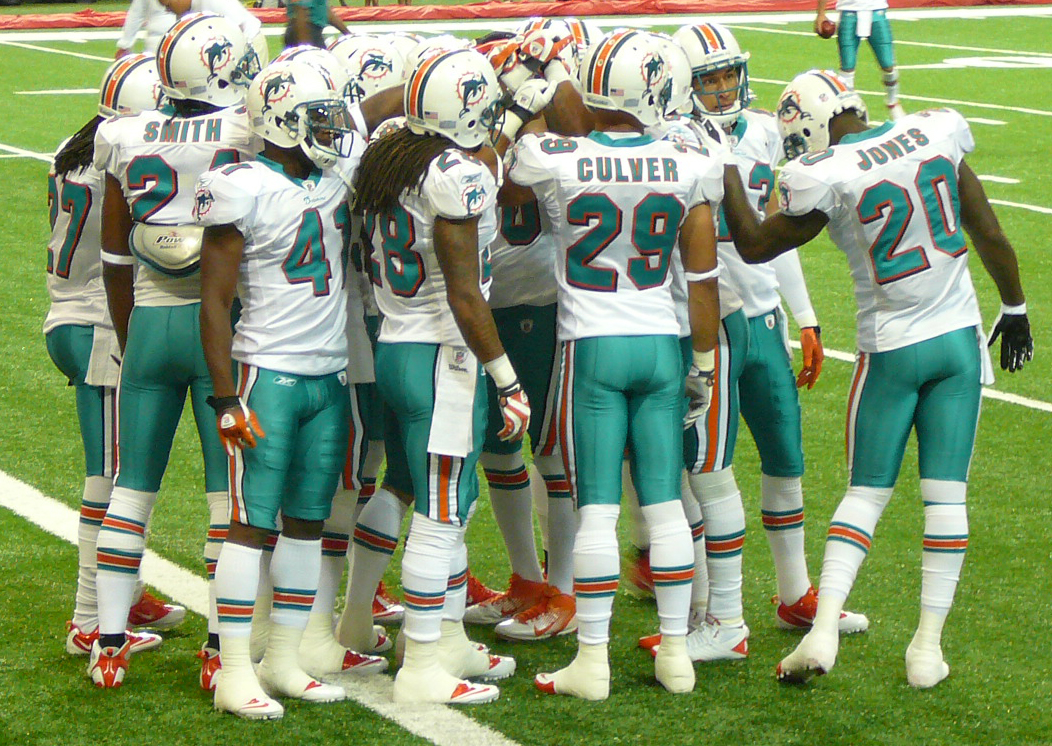
The Dolphins' defensive backs huddle during the preseason opener in Atlanta.

Week	Date	Opponent	Result	Record	Game site	NFL.com recap
1	August 12	at Atlanta Falcons	W 28–23	1–0	Georgia Dome	Recap
2	August 19	Carolina Panthers	W 20–10	2–0	Sun Life Stadium	Recap
3	August 27	at Tampa Bay Buccaneers	L 13–17	2–1	Raymond James Stadium	Recap
4	September 1	Dallas Cowboys	W 17–3	3–1	Sun Life Stadium	Recap

=== Regular season ===
Week	Date	Opponent	Result	Record	Game site	NFL.com recap
1	September 12	New England Patriots	L 24–38	0–1	Sun Life Stadium	Recap
2	September 18	Houston Texans	L 13–23	0–2	Sun Life Stadium	Recap
3	September 25	at Cleveland Browns	L 16–17	0–3	Cleveland Browns Stadium	Recap
4	October 2	at San Diego Chargers	L 16–26	0–4	Qualcomm Stadium	Recap
5	Bye					
6	October 17	at New York Jets	L 6–24	0–5	MetLife Stadium	Recap
7	October 23	Denver Broncos	L 15–18 (OT)	0–6	Sun Life Stadium	Recap
8	October 30	at New York Giants	L 17–20	0–7	MetLife Stadium	Recap
9	November 6	at Kansas City Chiefs	W 31–3	1–7	Arrowhead Stadium	Recap
10	November 13	Washington Redskins	W 20–9	2–7	Sun Life Stadium	Recap
11	November 20	Buffalo Bills	W 35–8	3–7	Sun Life Stadium	Recap
12	November 24	at Dallas Cowboys	L 19–20	3–8	Cowboys Stadium	Recap
13	December 4	Oakland Raiders	W 34–14	4–8	Sun Life Stadium	Recap
14	December 11	Philadelphia Eagles	L 10–26	4–9	Sun Life Stadium	Recap
15	December 18	at Buffalo Bills	W 30–23	5–9	Ralph Wilson Stadium	Recap
16	December 24	at New England Patriots	L 24–27	5–10	Gillette Stadium	Recap
17	January 1	New York Jets	W 19–17	6–10	Sun Life Stadium	Recap

=== Game summaries ===
==== Week 1: vs. New England Patriots ====
Week One: New England Patriots at Miami Dolphins – Game summary

Quarter	1	2	3	4	Total
Patriots	7	7	14	10	38
Dolphins	7	0	10	7	24

at Sun Life Stadium, Miami Gardens, Florida

- Date: September 12
- Game time: 7:00 p.m. EDT
- Game weather: 82 °F or 27.8 °C, partly cloudy
- Game attendance: 66,860
- Referee: Pete Morelli
- TV announcers (ESPN): Mike Tirico, Jon Gruden & Ron Jaworski, Suzy Kolber & Wendi Nix

Game information

First quarter

- MIA – Chad Henne 9-yard run (Dan Carpenter kick), Dolphins 7–0, Drive: 12 plays, 84 yards, 7:18.
- NE – BenJarvus Green-Ellis 4-yard run (Stephen Gostkowski kick), Tied 7–7, Drive: 6 plays, 78 yards, 3:28.

Second quarter

- NE – Rob Gronkowski 10-yard reception from Tom Brady (Stephen Gostkowski kick), Patriots 14–7, Drive: 7 plays, 65 yards, 2:54

Third quarter

- MIA – Brian Hartline 10-yard reception from Chad Henne (Dan Carpenter kick), Tied 14–14, Drive: 2 plays, 9 yards, 0:44
- NE – Wes Welker 2-yard reception from Tom Brady (Stephen Gostkowski kick), Patriots 21–14, Drive: 10 plays, 73 yards, 4:06
- MIA – Dan Carpenter 20-yard field goal, Patriots 21–17, Drive: 10 plays, 87 yards, 4:47.
- NE – Aaron Hernandez 1-yard reception from Tom Brady (Stephen Gostkowski kick), Patriots 28–17, Drive: 8 plays, 78 yards, 3:26

Fourth quarter

- NE – Stephen Gostkowski 20-yard field goal, Patriots 31–17, Drive: 9 plays, 62 yards, 3:35.
- NE – Wes Welker 99-yard reception from Tom Brady (Stephen Gostkowski kick), Patriots 38–17, Drive: 1 plays, 99 yards, 0:13
- MIA – Reggie Bush 2-yard reception from Chad Henne (Dan Carpenter kick), Patriots 38–24, Drive: 8 plays, 74 yards, 2:05

Top passers

- NE – Tom Brady – 32/48, 517 yards, 4 TDs
- MIA – Chad Henne – 30/49, 416 yards, 2 TDs

Top rushers

- NE – Danny Woodhead – 14 rushes, 69 yards
- MIA – Chad Henne – 7 rushes, 59 yards, 1 TD

Top receivers

- NE – Wes Welker – 8 receptions, 160 yards, 2 TDs
- MIA – Brandon Marshall – 7 receptions, 139 yards

Top tacklers

- NE – Devin McCourty – 10 tackles, 1 assist
- MIA – Reshad Jones – 8 tackles, 4 assists

The Dolphins began their 2011 campaign at home, for a Week 1 AFC East duel with the New England Patriots in the first game of Monday Night Football's doubleheader. Miami delivered the game's opening splash with a 9-yard touchdown run from quarterback Chad Henne. The Patriots answered with running back BenJarvus Green-Ellis getting a 4-yard touchdown run. New England took the lead in the second quarter as quarterback Tom Brady completed a 10-yard touchdown pass to tight end Rob Gronkowski.

The Dolphins struck back in the third quarter as Henne found wide receiver Brian Hartline on a 10-yard touchdown pass, but New England came right back with Brady completing a 2-yard touchdown pass to wide receiver Wes Welker. Miami replied with a 20-yard field goal from kicker Dan Carpenter, but the Patriots came right back with Brady completing a 1-yard touchdown pass to tight end Aaron Hernandez. New England added onto their in the fourth quarter as kicker Stephen Gostkowski got a 20-yard field goal, followed by Brady completing a 99-yard touchdown pass to Welker. The Dolphins would close out the game with Henne finding running back Reggie Bush on a 2-yard touchdown pass.

With the loss, Miami began their season at 0–1.

==== Week 2: vs. Houston Texans ====
Week Two: Houston Texans at Miami Dolphins – Game summary

Quarter	1	2	3	4	Total
Texans	6	10	0	7	23
Dolphins	3	0	7	3	13

at Sun Life Stadium, Miami Gardens, Florida

- Date: September 18
- Game time: 4:15 p.m. EDT
- Game weather: 87 °F or 30.6 °C, sunny
- Game attendance: 51,032
- Referee: John Parry
- TV announcers (CBS): Ian Eagle and Dan Fouts

Game information

First quarter

Second quarter

Third quarter

Fourth quarter

Top passers

- HOU – Matt Schaub 21/29 230 Yds 2 TD
- MIA – Chad Henne 12/30 170 Yds 1 TD 1 Int.

Top rushers

- HOU – Ben Tate 23 Rushes 103 Yds 4.5 Avg 16
- MIA – Daniel Thomas 18 Rushes 107 Yds. 5.9 Avg 14

Top receivers

- HOU – Andre Johnson 7 Rec 93 Yds 13.3 Avg 43 Lng 1 TD
- MIA – Brandon Marshall 6 Rec 79 Yds 13.2 Avg 29 Lng 1 TD

Top tacklers

- HOU – Brian Cushing 7 Tack 3 Ast
- MIA – Randy Starks 6 Tack 0 Ast

With the loss, the Dolphins dropped to 0–2.

==== Week 3: at Cleveland Browns ====
Week Three: Miami Dolphins at Cleveland Browns – Game summary

Quarter	1	2	3	4	Total
Dolphins	7	3	3	3	16
Browns	0	7	3	7	17

at Cleveland Browns Stadium, Cleveland, Ohio

- Date: September 25
- Game time: 1:00 p.m. EDT
- Game weather: 70 °F or 21.1 °C, sunny
- Game attendance: 66,651
- Referee: Walt Anderson
- TV announcers (CBS): Don Criqui and Randy Cross

Game information

First quarter

- MIA (8:09) – Daniel Thomas 10 yd pass from Chad Henne (Dan Carpenter kick). (MIA 7-0) Drive: 4 plays, 43 yds, 1:56

Second quarter

- CLE (7:16) – Joshua Cribbs 33 yd pass from Colt McCoy (Phil Dawson kick). (Tied 7-7) Drive: 6 plays, 59 yds, 2:43
- MIA (0:27) – Dan Carpenter 23 yd field goal. (MIA 10-7) Drive: 11 plays, 75 yds, 3:38

Third quarter

- CLE (10:37) – Phil Dawson 30 yd field goal. (Tied 10-10) Drive: 9 plays, 68 yds, 4:23
- MIA (2:29) – Dan Carpenter 41 yd field goal. (MIA 13-10) Drive: 14 plays, 70 yds, 8:08

Fourth quarter

- MIA (3:23) – Dan Carpenter 38 yd field goal. (MIA 16-10) Drive: 8 plays, 39 yds, 2:57
- CLE (0:43) – Mohamed Massaquoi 14 yd pass from Colt McCoy (Phil Dawson kick) (CLE 17-16) Drive: 13 plays, 80 yds, 2:40

Top passers

- MIA – Chad Henne 19/29, 255 yds, 1 TD, 1 INT
- CLE – Colt McCoy 19/39, 210 yds, 2 TD, 1 INT

Top rushers

- MIA – Daniel Thomas 23 carr, 95 yds
- CLE – Montario Hardesty 14 carr, 67 yds

Top receivers

- MIA – Brian Hartline 4 rec, 87 yds
- CLE – Benjamin Watson 5 rec, 64 yds

Top tacklers

- MIA – Will Allen 5 tackles
- CLE – Ahtyba Rubin 8 tackles, 1.5 sacks

With the loss, the Dolphins fell to 0–3.

==== Week 4: at San Diego Chargers ====
Week Four: Miami Dolphins at San Diego Chargers – Game summary

Quarter	1	2	3	4	Total
Dolphins	7	3	3	3	16
Chargers	7	6	10	3	26

at Qualcomm Stadium, San Diego, California

- Date: October 2
- Game time: 4:15 p.m. EDT/1:15 p.m. PDT
- Game weather: 84 °F or 28.9 °C, sunny
- Game attendance: 63,002
- Referee: Jeff Triplette
- TV announcers (CBS): Ian Eagle and Dan Fouts

Game information

First quarter

Second quarter

Third quarter

Fourth quarter

Top passers

- MIA – Matt More
- SD – Philp Rivers

Top rushers

- MIA –
- SD –

Top receivers

- MIA –
- SD –

Top tacklers

- MIA –
- SD –

With the loss, the Dolphins went into their bye week 0–4.

==== Week 6: at New York Jets ====
Week Six: Miami Dolphins at New York Jets – Game summary

Quarter	1	2	3	4	Total
Dolphins	3	3	0	0	6
Jets	7	7	3	7	24

at MetLife Stadium, East Rutherford, New Jersey

- Date: October 17
- Game time: 8:30 p.m. EDT
- Game weather: 62 °F or 16.7 °C, clear
- Game attendance: 78,912
- Referee: Tony Corrente
- TV announcers (ESPN): Mike Tirico, Ron Jaworski, Jon Gruden and Suzy Kolber

Game information

First quarter

Second quarter

Third quarter

Fourth quarter

Top passers

- MIA – Matt Moore- 16/34, 204, 2INT
- NYJ – Mark Sanchez- 14/25, 201 yards, 1TD

Top rushers

- MIA – Reggie Bush- 10 rushes, 71 yards
- NYJ – Shonn Greene- 21 rushes, 74 yards

Top receivers

- MIA – Brandon Marshall- 6 receptions, 106 yards
- NYJ – Santonio Holmes- 3 receptions, 63 yards, 1TD

Top tacklers

- MIA – Yeremiah Bell- 7 tackles
- NYJ – Jim Leonhard- 7 tackles
  Calvin Pace- 7 tackles, 2 sacks, 1 tackle for loss

With the loss, the Dolphins fell to 0–5.

==== Week 7: vs. Denver Broncos ====
Week Seven: Denver Broncos at Miami Dolphins – Game summary

Quarter	1	2	3	4	OT	Total
Broncos	0	0	0	15	3	18
Dolphins	0	6	0	9	0	15

at Sun Life Stadium, Miami Gardens, Florida

- Date: October 23
- Game time: 1:00 p.m. EDT
- Game weather: 77 °F or 25 °C, sunny
- Game attendance: 63,800
- Referee: Clete Blakeman
- TV announcers (CBS): Kevin Harlan and Solomon Wilcots

Game information

First quarter

Second quarter

Third quarter

Fourth quarter

Top passers

- DEN –
- MIA –

Top rushers

- DEN –
- MIA –

Top receivers

- DEN –
- MIA –

Top tacklers

- DEN –
- MIA –

The Broncos overcame a 15–0 fourth-quarter deficit and won on a game-winning field goal in overtime. With the loss, the Dolphins fell to 0–6 and recorded their first home loss to the Broncos in eight meetings.

==== Week 8: at New York Giants ====
Week Eight: Miami Dolphins at New York Giants – Game summary

Quarter	1	2	3	4	Total
Dolphins	7	7	3	0	17
Giants	3	7	0	10	20

at MetLife Stadium, East Rutherford, New Jersey

- Date: October 30
- Game time: 1:00 p.m. EDT
- Game weather: 45 °F or 7.2 °C, sunny
- Game attendance: 79,302
- Referee: Ron Winter
- TV announcers (CBS): Greg Gumbel and Dan Dierdorf

Game information

First quarter

Second quarter

Third quarter

Fourth quarter

Top passers

- MIA –
- NYG –

Top rushers

- MIA –
- NYG –

Top receivers

- MIA –
- NYG –

Top tacklers

- MIA –
- NYG –

With the loss, the Dolphins fell to 0–7.

==== Week 9: at Kansas City Chiefs ====
Week Nine: Miami Dolphins at Kansas City Chiefs – Game summary

Quarter	1	2	3	4	Total
Dolphins	7	7	14	3	31
Chiefs	3	0	0	0	3

at Arrowhead Stadium, Kansas City, Missouri

- Date: November 6
- Game time: 1:00 p.m. EST/12:00 p.m. CST
- Game weather: 62 °F or 16.7 °C, cloudy
- Game attendance: 72,263
- Referee: Walt Anderson
- TV announcers (CBS): Kevin Harlan and Solomon Wilcots

Game information

First quarter

Second quarter

Third quarter

Fourth quarter

Top passers

- MIA –
- KC –

Top rushers

- MIA –
- KC –

Top receivers

- MIA –
- KC –

Top tacklers

- MIA –
- KC –

With the win, the Dolphins improved to 1–7 and made the Colts the only winless team.

==== Week 10: vs. Washington Redskins ====
Week Ten: Washington Redskins at Miami Dolphins – Game summary

Quarter	1	2	3	4	Total
Redskins	3	3	3	0	9
Dolphins	7	3	3	7	20

at Sun Life Stadium, Miami Gardens, Florida

- Date: November 13
- Game time: 1:00 p.m. EST
- Game weather: 79 °F or 26.1 °C, mostly cloudy
- Game attendance: 57,007
- Referee: Carl Cheffers
- TV announcers (Fox): Chris Myers & Tim Ryan

Game information

First quarter

Second quarter

Third quarter

Fourth quarter

Top passers

- WAS –
- MIA –

Top rushers

- WAS –
- MIA –

Top receivers

- WAS –
- MIA –

Top tacklers

- WAS –
- MIA –

With the win, the Dolphins improved to 2–7.

==== Week 11: vs. Buffalo Bills ====
Week Eleven: Buffalo Bills at Miami Dolphins – Game summary

Quarter	1	2	3	4	Total
Bills	3	3	0	2	8
Dolphins	14	14	7	0	35

at Sun Life Stadium, Miami Gardens, Florida

- Date: November 20
- Game time: 1:00 p.m. EST
- Game weather: 80 °F or 26.7 °C, mostly cloudy
- Game attendance: 57,531
- Referee: Walt Coleman
- TV announcers (CBS): Marv Albert and Rich Gannon

Game information

First quarter

- BUF – Dave Rayner 30-yard field goal, Bills 3–0, Drive: 9 plays, 70 yards, 4:47.
- MIA – Anthony Fasano 10-yard reception from Matt Moore (Shayne Graham kick), Dolphins 7–3, Drive: 12 plays, 87 yards, 6:45
- MIA – Reggie Bush 5-yard run (Shayne Graham kick), Dolphins 14–3, Drive: 4 plays, 59 yards, 1:40.

Second quarter

- MIA – Charles Clay 12-yard reception from Matt Moore (Shayne Graham kick), Dolphins 21–3, Drive: 5 plays, 23 yards, 2:09
- MIA – Davone Bess 4-yard reception from Matt Moore (Shayne Graham kick), Dolphins 28–3, Drive: 5 plays, 4 yards, 0:32
- BUF – Dave Rayner 56-yard field goal, Dolphins 28–6, Drive: 8 plays, 39 yards, 1:36.

Third quarter

- MIA – Lex Hilliard recovered blocked punt in the end zone (Shayne Graham kick), Dolphins 35–6

Fourth quarter

- BUF – Daniel Thomas tackled in end zone by Kelvin Sheppard, Safety

Top passers

- BUF –
- MIA –

Top rushers

- BUF –
- MIA –

Top receivers

- BUF –
- MIA –

Top tacklers

- BUF –
- MIA –

Coming off their win over the Redskins, the Dolphins stayed at home for a Week 11 AFC East showdown with the Buffalo Bills. Miami trailed early in the first quarter as Bills kicker Dave Rayner made a 30-yard field goal, yet the Dolphins immediately answered with quarterback Matt Moore finding tight end Anthony Fasano on a 1-yard touchdown pass, followed by a 5-yard touchdown run from running back Reggie Bush. Miami would add onto their lead in the second quarter with Moore connecting with fullback Charles Clay on a 12-yard touchdown pass, followed by wide receiver Davone Bess on a 4-yard touchdown pass. Buffalo would close out the half with Rayner booting a 56-yard field goal.

The Dolphins continued their dominating day in the third quarter with running back Lex Hilliard recovering a blocked punt in the endzone for a touchdown (the team's first TD off of a blocked punt since 1990). The Bills tried to rally as linebacker Kelvin Sheppard tackled rookie running back Daniel Thomas in the endzone for a safety, but Miami's lead proved to be too much to overcome.

With the win, the Dolphins improved to 3–7.

This game also marked the first time since 1990 that Miami allowed 10 points or fewer in three straight games. They became the third team in NFL history to win 3 straight after starting the season at least 0–7 (1978 Cardinals and 1986 Colts).

==== Week 12: at Dallas Cowboys ====
Thanksgiving Day game

Week Twelve: Miami Dolphins at Dallas Cowboys – Game summary

Quarter	1	2	3	4	Total
Dolphins	3	3	10	3	19
Cowboys	0	10	0	10	20

at Cowboys Stadium, Arlington, Texas

- Date: November 24
- Game time: 4:15 p.m. EST/3:15 p.m. CST
- Game weather: Played indoors (retractable roof closed)
- Game attendance: 87,418
- Referee: Pete Morelli
- TV announcers (CBS): Jim Nantz & Phil Simms

Game information

First quarter

Second quarter

Third quarter

Fourth quarter

Top passers

- MIA –
- DAL –

Top rushers

- MIA –
- DAL –

Top receivers

- MIA –
- DAL –

Top tacklers

- MIA –
- DAL –

Coming off their win over the Bills, the Dolphins flew to Cowboys Stadium for a Week 12 interconference duel with the Dallas Cowboys on Thanksgiving. Miami delivered the game's opening punch in the first quarter with a 26-yard field goal from kicker Shayne Graham, but the Cowboys answered in the second quarter with kicker Dan Bailey getting a 32-yard field goal, followed by quarterback Tony Romo completing a 5-yard touchdown pass to wide receiver Laurent Robinson. The Dolphins would close out the half with a 28-yard field goal from Graham.

Miami would regain the lead in the third quarter with a 27-yard field goal from Graham, followed by quarterback Matt Moore finding wide receiver Brandon Marshall on a 35-yard field goal. Dallas struck back in the fourth quarter with Romo completing an 18-yard touchdown pass to Robinson. The Dolphins would reply with a 23-yard field goal from Graham, but the Cowboys got the last laugh with Bailey nailing the game-winning 28-yard field goal.

With the loss, Miami fell to 3–8.

==== Week 13: vs. Oakland Raiders ====
Week Thirteen: Oakland Raiders at Miami Dolphins – Game summary

Quarter	1	2	3	4	Total
Raiders	0	0	0	14	14
Dolphins	6	7	21	0	34

at Sun Life Stadium, Miami Gardens, Florida

- Date: December 4
- Game time: 1:00 p.m. EST
- Game weather: 80 °F or 26.7 °C, sunny
- Game attendance: 57,225
- Referee: Mike Carey
- TV announcers (CBS): Greg Gumbel & Dan Dierdorf

Game information

First quarter

Second quarter

Third quarter

Fourth quarter

Top passers

- OAK –
- MIA –

Top rushers

- OAK –
- MIA –

Top receivers

- OAK –
- MIA –

Top tacklers

- OAK –
- MIA –

With the win, the Dolphins improved to 4–8.

==== Week 14: vs. Philadelphia Eagles ====
Week Fourteen: Philadelphia Eagles at Miami Dolphins – Game summary

Quarter	1	2	3	4	Total
Eagles	0	24	0	2	26
Dolphins	7	0	3	0	10

at Sun Life Stadium, Miami Gardens, Florida

- Date: December 11
- Game time: 1:00 p.m. EST
- Game weather: 75 °F or 23.9 °C, cloudy
- Game attendance: 67,823
- Referee: Ron Winter
- TV announcers (Fox): Chris Myers, Tim Ryan and Jaime Maggio

Game information

First quarter

Second quarter

Third quarter

Fourth quarter

Top passers

- PHI –
- MIA –

Top rushers

- PHI –
- MIA –

Top receivers

- PHI –
- MIA –

Top tacklers

- PHI –
- MIA –

With the loss, the Dolphins dropped to 4–9, and were officially eliminated from postseason contention. One day later (December 12), head coach Tony Sparano was fired and replaced by assistant coach Todd Bowles on an interim basis for the remainder of the season.

==== Week 15: at Buffalo Bills ====
Week Fifteen: Miami Dolphins at Buffalo Bills – Game summary

Quarter	1	2	3	4	Total
Dolphins	0	13	7	10	30
Bills	7	0	0	16	23

at Ralph Wilson Stadium, Orchard Park, New York

- Date: December 18
- Game time: 1:00 p.m. EST
- Game weather: 31 °F or −0.6 °C, cloudy/snow
- Game attendance: 60,988
- Referee: John Parry
- TV announcers (CBS): Kevin Harlan and Solomon Wilcots

Game information

First quarter

Second quarter

Third quarter

Fourth quarter

Top passers

- MIA –
- BUF –

Top rushers

- MIA –
- BUF –

Top receivers

- MIA –
- BUF –

Top tacklers

- MIA –
- BUF –

==== Week 16: at New England Patriots ====
Week Sixteen: Miami Dolphins at New England Patriots – Game summary

Quarter	1	2	3	4	Total
Dolphins	3	14	0	7	24
Patriots	0	0	17	10	27

at Gillette Stadium, Foxborough, Massachusetts

- Date: December 24
- Game time: 1:00 p.m. EST
- Game weather: 30 °F or −1.1 °C, sunny and cold
- Game attendance: 68,756
- Referee: Alberto Riveron
- TV announcers (CBS): Ian Eagle and Dan Fouts

Game information

First quarter

Second quarter

Third quarter

Fourth quarter

Top passers

- MIA –
- NE –

Top rushers

- MIA –
- NE –

Top receivers

- MIA –
- NE –

Top tacklers

- MIA –
- NE –

==== Week 17: vs. New York Jets ====
Week Seventeen: New York Jets at Miami Dolphins – Game summary

Quarter	1	2	3	4	Total
Jets	7	3	0	7	17
Dolphins	3	3	0	13	19

at Sun Life Stadium, Miami Gardens, Florida

- Date: January 1
- Game time: 1:00 p.m. EST
- Game weather: 78 °F or 25.6 °C, sunny
- Game attendance: 65,811
- Referee: Jerome Boger
- TV announcers (CBS): Greg Gumbel & Dan Dierdorf

Game information

First quarter

Second quarter

Third quarter

Fourth quarter

Top passers

- NYJ – Mark Sanchez 21/32, 207 yds, 2 TDs
- MIA – Matt Moore 22/32, 135 yds, 1 TD

Top rushers

- NYJ – L. Tomlinson 11 rushes, 56 yds
- MIA – Steve Slaton 11 rushes, 55 yds

Top receivers

- NYJ – Jeremy Kerley 4 receptions, 71 yds
- MIA – Brandon Marshall 5 receptions, 50 yds

Top tacklers

- NYJ –
- MIA –

The Dolphins closed out their season with a 19–17 win over the Jets that knocked the Jets out of playoff contention. The Dolphins intercepted Mark Sanchez three times and limited him to 235 passing yards. The win was the 400th in Miami Dolphins franchise history and the final game for Jason Taylor, held to one tackle in the game; he recovered what was initially ruled a fumble by the Jets and raced to a touchdown, but the score was nullified when the ball was ruled down by contact.

== Standings ==
AFC East
	W	L	T	PCT	DIV	CONF	PF	PA	STK
^{(1)} New England Patriots	13	3	0	.813	5–1	10–2	513	342	W8
New York Jets	8	8	0	.500	3–3	6–6	377	363	L3
Miami Dolphins	6	10	0	.375	3–3	5–7	329	313	W1
Buffalo Bills	6	10	0	.375	1–5	4–8	372	434	L1
