= 2013 Miami Dolphins season =

48th season in franchise history

- Owner: Stephen M. Ross
- General manager: Jeff Ireland
- Head coach: Joe Philbin
- Home stadium: Sun Life Stadium

Results
- Record: 8–8
- Division place: 3rd AFC East
- Playoffs: Did not qualify
- Pro Bowlers: 4: P Brandon Fields; CB Brent Grimes; C Mike Pouncey; DE Cameron Wake

Uniform
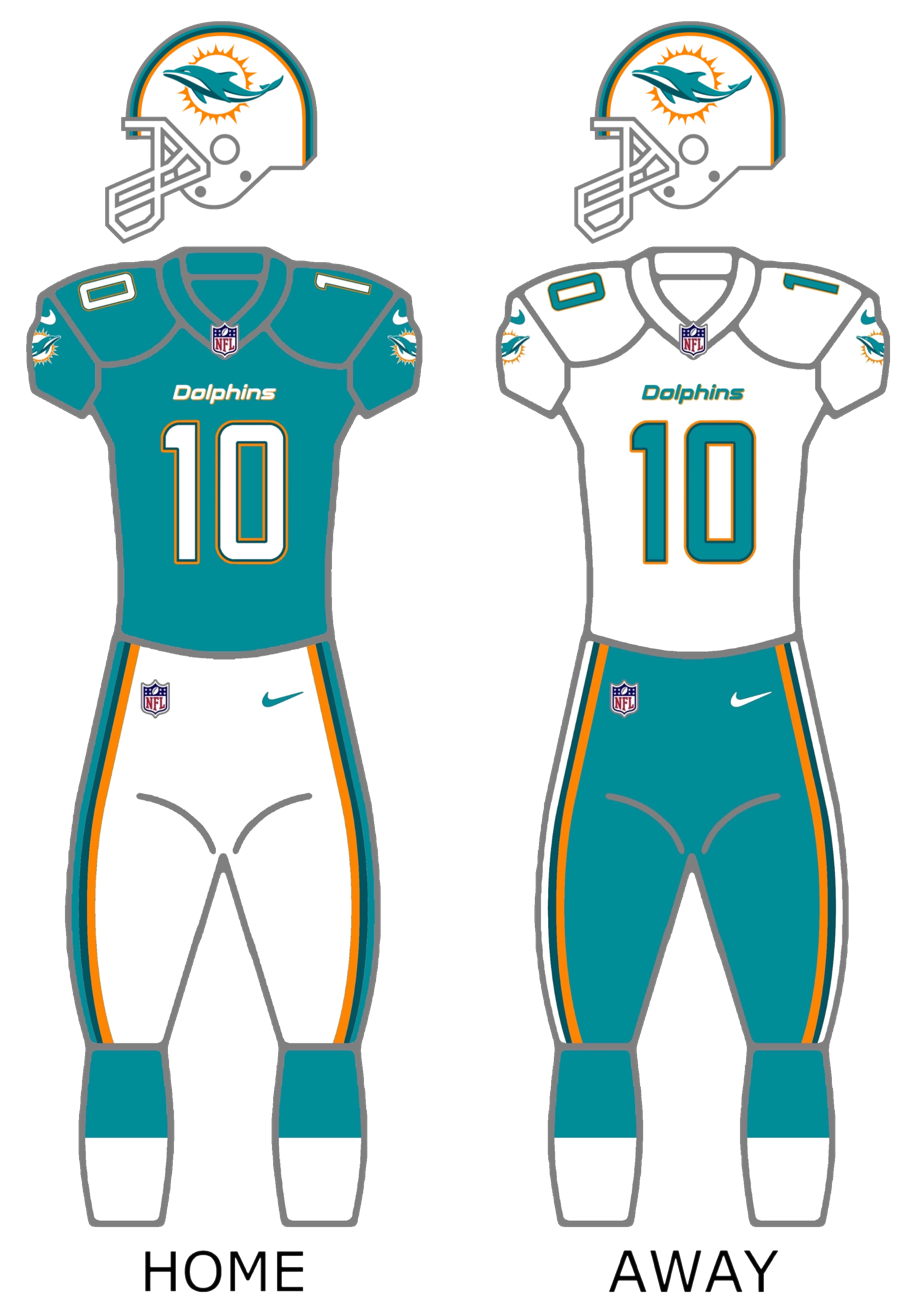

The 2013 season was the Miami Dolphins' 44th in the National Football league (NFL) and their 48th overall. The season concluded with the Dolphins finishing third in the AFC East division with an 8–8 record, and no postseason play for the fifth consecutive season. The Dolphins allowed a league-high 58 sacks.

The Dolphins entered the season under second-year head coach Joe Philbin.

== Personnel changes ==
=== Logo change ===
During the 2012 season, speculation about the Dolphins updating their current logo, which was introduced during the 1997 season, began during a conference call with season-ticket holders; as owner Stephen Ross and CEO Mike Dee eagerly agreed with a fan on the potential changing of the logo. On December 26, 2012, via Dolphins CEO Mike Dee's Twitter account, Dee unofficially announced that a logo change would take place, but the team was still considering different designs; and an official announcement would be provided sometime before the 2013 NFL draft.

On March 27, 2013, following an accidental leaking of the new Dolphins logo on NFL.com, Dee confirmed in a press conference that the leaked image, as seen on NFL.com, was in fact the new official logo. This announcement came almost a month premature to the scheduled release date of the logo on April 25.

== Roster changes ==
=== Signings ===
Pos.	Player	2012 Team	Contract
WR	Mike Wallace	Pittsburgh Steelers	5 years, $60 million
LB	Dannell Ellerbe	Baltimore Ravens	5 years, $35 million
LB	Philip Wheeler	Oakland Raiders	5 years, $26 million
WR	Brandon Gibson	St. Louis Rams	3 years, $9.7 million
CB	Brent Grimes	Atlanta Falcons	1 year, $5.5 million
TE	Dustin Keller	New York Jets	1 year, $4.2 million
OT	Tyson Clabo	Atlanta Falcons	1 year, $3.5 million
DE	Nathan Williams	Minnesota Vikings	

=== Re-Signings ===
Pos.	Player	Contract
OT	Nate Garner	3 years, $4.8 million
FS	Chris Clemons	1 year, $2.7 million
WR	Julius Pruitt	2 year, $1 million

=== Departures ===
Pos.	Player	2013 Team
OT	Jake Long	St. Louis Rams
CB	Sean Smith	Kansas City Chiefs
RB	Reggie Bush	Detroit Lions
LB	Kevin Burnett	Oakland Raiders
LB	Karlos Dansby	Arizona Cardinals
DE	Randy Starks	Cleveland Browns
TE	Anthony Fasano	Kansas City Chiefs
DE	Tony McDaniel	Seattle Seahawks
K	Nate Kaeding	Tampa Bay Buccaneers

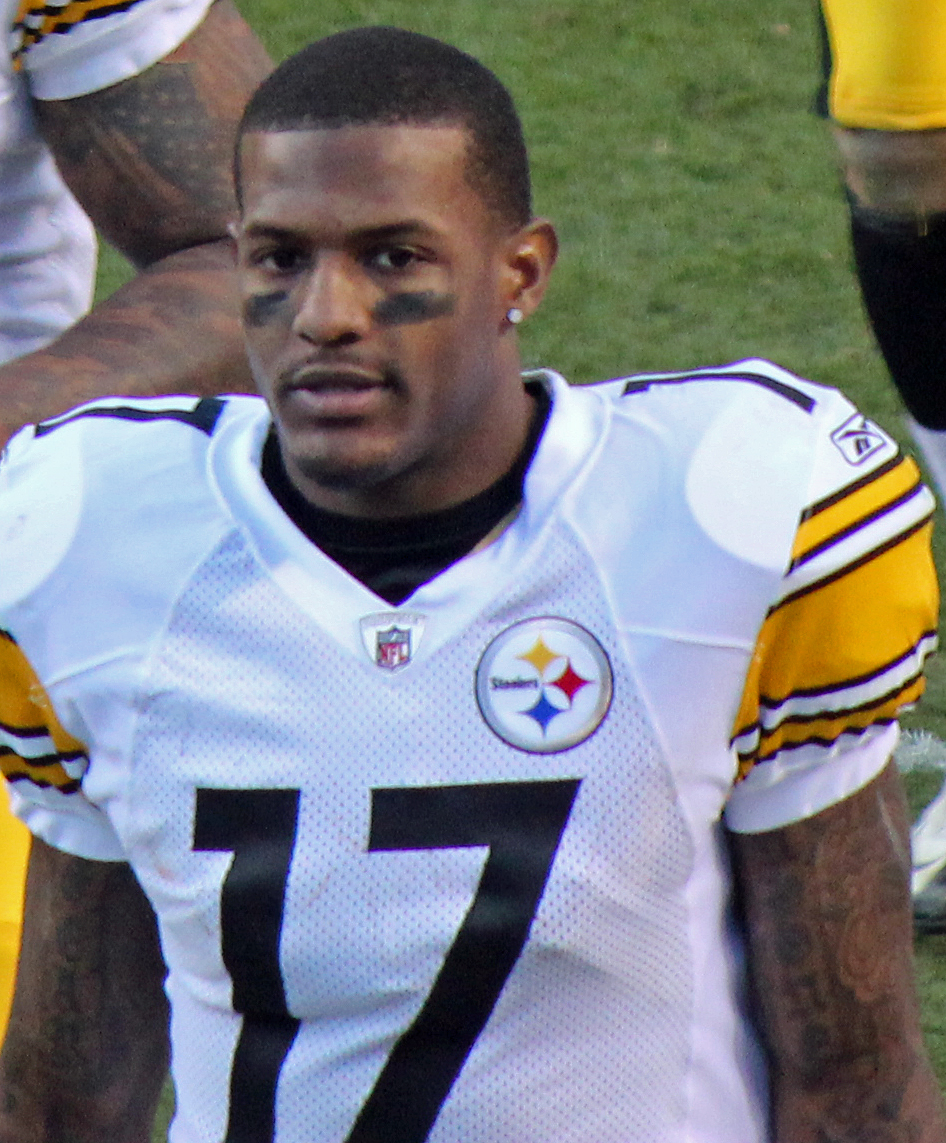
The Dolphins acquired Mike Wallace, who was viewed as the top free agent by analysts

The Miami Dolphins entered the 2013 off-season with an estimated $45 million in salary cap space, third most among other teams, to retain the contracts of impending unrestricted free agents: running back Reggie Bush, safety Chris Clemons, tight end Anthony Fasano, wide receiver Brian Hartline, offensive tackle Jake Long, quarterback Matt Moore, cornerback Sean Smith and defensive tackle Randy Starks. As well as any future free agent signings, and 2013 NFL draft picks.

On March 4, 2013, the Dolphins placed their franchise tag on defensive tackle Randy Starks, and Starks signed the franchise tender on March 20. The move kept Starks from becoming an unrestricted free agent and guaranteed him $8.45 million from the $3.72 million earned during the 2012 season.

On March 8, 2013, coming off his best career season, wide receiver Brian Hartline signed a new five-year contract for an estimated $31 million to remain with the Dolphins. Hartline's agent Drew Rosenhaus believed Hartline could have received more money in the open market, but decided to take a discount to remain a Dolphin. Shortly after, it was reported that quarterback Matt Moore signed a new two-year contract for an estimated $8 million, and should continue to play a backup role behind second year quarterback Ryan Tannehill.

When the NFL free agency period began at 4 p.m. EST on March 12, 2013, former Pittsburgh Steelers wide receiver Mike Wallace, who was viewed as the top free agent prospect of the 2013 offseason by many analysts, signed a five-year contract for an estimated $60 million. The Dolphins signed former Baltimore Ravens linebacker Dannell Ellerbe to a five-year deal worth an estimated $35 million, and former Oakland Raiders linebacker Philip Wheeler to a five-year deal worth an estimated $26 million. Subsequently, Miami released veteran linebackers Karlos Dansby and Kevin Burnett. While safety Chris Clemons re-signed a one-year contract to remain a Dolphin, and unrestricted free agent Anthony Fasano, who had spent the last five seasons in Miami, signed a four-year deal with the Kansas City Chiefs.

On March 13, 2013, it was reported that Reggie Bush had signed a four-year $16 million contract to play for the Detroit Lions.

On March 15, 2013, cornerback Sean Smith decided to part ways from the Dolphins and signed a new three-year contract with the Kansas City Chiefs. Former New York Jets tight end Dustin Keller signed a new one-year contract, worth an estimated $4.25 million, and former St. Louis Rams wide receiver Brandon Gibson signed a new three-year contract with the Dolphins.

Former Dolphins 2008 first round draft pick, offensive tackle Jake Long, after courting offers from various teams, signed a new four-year contract, worth an estimated $34 million, with the St. Louis Rams on March 18, 2013.

On March 30, 2013, cornerback Brent Grimes signed a one-year $5.5 million year with the Dolphins.

On October 22, 2013, the Dolphins acquired offensive tackle Bryant McKinnie from the Baltimore Ravens for a conditional late round pick.

== 2013 draft class ==
The 2013 National Football League Draft was held from April 25–27 in the Radio City Music Hall in New York City.

Round	Selection	Player	Position	College	Ref	Notes
1	3	Dion Jordan	Defensive end	Oregon		^{[a]}
2	54	Jamar Taylor	Cornerback	Boise State		^{[a]} ^{[b]}
3	77	Dallas Thomas	Guard	Tennessee		
3	93	Will Davis	Cornerback	Utah State		^{[c]}
4	104	Jelani Jenkins	Linebacker	Florida		^{[d]}
4	106	Dion Sims	Tight end	Michigan St.		^{[c]}
5	164	Mike Gillislee	Running back	Florida		^{[c]} ^{[d]}
5	166	Caleb Sturgis	Placekicker	Florida		^{[e]}
7	250	Don Jones	Strong safety	Arkansas State		^{[c]} ^{[d]} ^{[e]}

Notes

^{^[a]} The Dolphins traded their first- (No. 12 overall) and original second- (No. 42 overall) round selections to the Oakland Raiders in exchange for the Raiders' first-round selection (No. 3 overall).
^{^[b]} The Dolphins acquired this second-round selection in a trade that sent cornerback Vontae Davis to the Indianapolis Colts.
^{^[c]} The Dolphins previously acquired an additional third-round selection — No. 82 overall — as part of a March 2012 trade that sent wide receiver Brandon Marshall to the Chicago Bears. The Dolphins later traded the No. 82 selection to the New Orleans Saints in exchange for two fourth-round selections from the Saints — Nos. 106 and 109 overall. The No. 109 selection, along with the Dolphins' original fifth-round selection (No. 146 overall) and one of their seventh-round selections (No. 224 overall — previously acquired in a July 2012 trade that sent guard Ryan Cook to the Dallas Cowboys), were traded to the Green Bay Packers in exchange for one of the Packers' third-round selections (No. 93 overall).
^{^[d]} The Dolphins acquired these fourth- and fifth-round selections in a trade that sent wide receiver Davone Bess the team's original fourth- and seventh-round selections (Nos. 111 and 217 overall, respectively) to the Cleveland Browns.
^{^[e]} Compensatory selection.

The Dolphins did not have a selection in the sixth round. The team traded their sixth-round selection (No. 180 overall) along with fourth- and sixth-round selections from the 2012 NFL draft to the San Francisco 49ers in exchange for the 49ers' 2012 fourth-round selection.

== Staff ==
2013 Miami Dolphins staff
Front office: Chairman/managing general partner – Stephen Ross; Vice chairman/partner – Jorge Perez; Vice chairman – Don Shula; President/CEO – Tom Garfinkel; General manager – Jeff Ireland; Assistant general manager – Brian Gaine; Executive vice president of football administration – Dawn Aponte; Director of college scouting – Chris Grier; Assistant director of college scouting – Joe Schoen; Director of pro scouting – Anthony Hunt; Assistant director of pro scouting – Chris Shea; Head coaches: Head coach – Joe Philbin; Offensive coaches: Offensive coordinator – Mike Sherman; Quarterbacks – Zac Taylor; Assistant quarterbacks – Ben Johnson; Running backs – Jeff Nixon; Wide receivers – Ken O'Keefe; Assistant wide receivers – Phil McGeoghan; Tight ends – Dan Campbell; Offensive line – Jim Turner; Assistant offensive line – Chris Mosley	Defensive coaches: Defensive coordinator – Kevin Coyle; Defensive line – Kacy Rodgers; Assistant defensive line – Charlie Bullen; Linebackers – George Edwards; Defensive quality control/assistant linebackers – David Corrao; Defensive backs – Lou Anarumo; Assistant defensive backs – Blue Adams; Special teams coaches: Special teams coordinator – Darren Rizzi; Assistant special teams coordinator – Marwan Maalouf; Strength and conditioning: Head strength and conditioning – Darren Krein; Assistant strength and conditioning – David Puloka

== Final roster ==
2013 Miami Dolphins roster
Quarterbacks (QB): 7 Pat Devlin; 8 Matt Moore; 17 Ryan Tannehill; Running backs (RB): 23 Mike Gillislee; 26 Lamar Miller; 34 Marcus Thigpen; 33 Daniel Thomas; Wide receivers (WR): 82 Brian Hartline; 18 Rishard Matthews; 14 Marlon Moore; 11 Mike Wallace; Tight ends (TE): 42 Charles Clay; 84 Michael Egnew; 80 Dion Sims	Offensive linemen (OL): 66 David Arkin G; 65 Sam Brenner G; 77 Tyson Clabo T; 75 Nate Garner C/G; 74 John Jerry G; 78 Bryant McKinnie T; 51 Mike Pouncey C; 70 Dallas Thomas G; 62 Danny Watkins G; Defensive linemen (DL): 90 A. J. Francis DT; 95 Dion Jordan DE; 98 Jared Odrick DE/DT; 79 Derrick Shelby DE; 96 Paul Soliai DT; 94 Randy Starks DT; 50 Olivier Vernon DE; 91 Cameron Wake DE	Linebackers (LB): 59 Dannell Ellerbe MLB; 56 Jonathan Freeny OLB; 53 Jelani Jenkins OLB; 55 Koa Misi OLB; 45 Austin Spitler MLB; 93 Jason Trusnik OLB; 52 Philip Wheeler OLB; Defensive backs (DB): 37 Jalil Brown CB; 28 Nolan Carroll CB; 30 Chris Clemons SS; 29 Will Davis CB; 21 Brent Grimes CB; 36 Don Jones FS; 20 Reshad Jones FS; 44 Jordan Kovacs SS; 41 Chris Owens CB; 22 Jamar Taylor CB; 31 Michael Thomas FS; 27 Jimmy Wilson SS; Special teams (ST): 92 John Denney LS; 2 Brandon Fields P; 9 Caleb Sturgis K	Practice squad: 97 Isaako Aaitui DT; 15 Reggie Dunn WR; 57 Josh Kaddu LB; 32 Cameron Marshall RB; 86 Kyle Miller TE; 40 Emmanuel Ogbuehi; 87 Ryan Spadola WR; 76 Jason Weaver T; Reserve: 19 Armon Binns WR (IR); 10 Brandon Gibson WR (IR); 68 Richie Incognito G (Susp.); 81 Dustin Keller TE (IR); 71 Jonathan Martin T (NF-Ill.); 24 Dimitri Patterson CB (IR); 25 R. J. Stanford CB (IR); 72 Will Yeatman T (IR); Rookies in italics 53 active, 8 reserve, 8 practice squad

== Schedule ==
=== Preseason ===
Week	Date	Opponent	Result	Record	Game site	NFL.com recap
HOF	August 4	Dallas Cowboys	**L** 20–24	0–1	Fawcett Stadium (Canton, Ohio)	Recap
1	August 9	at Jacksonville Jaguars	**W** 27–3	1–1	EverBank Field	Recap
2	August 17	at Houston Texans	**L** 17–24	1–2	Reliant Stadium	Recap
3	August 24	Tampa Bay Buccaneers	**L** 16–17	1–3	Sun Life Stadium	Recap
4	August 29	New Orleans Saints	**W** 24–21	2–3	Sun Life Stadium	Recap

=== Regular season ===
Week	Date	Opponent	Result	Record	Game site	NFL.com recap
1	September 8	at Cleveland Browns	**W** 23–10	1–0	FirstEnergy Stadium	Recap
2	September 15	at Indianapolis Colts	**W** 24–20	2–0	Lucas Oil Stadium	Recap
3	September 22	Atlanta Falcons	**W** 27–23	3–0	Sun Life Stadium	Recap
4	September 30	at New Orleans Saints	**L** 17–38	3–1	Mercedes-Benz Superdome	Recap
5	October 6	Baltimore Ravens	**L** 23–26	3–2	Sun Life Stadium	Recap
6	Bye					
7	October 20	**Buffalo Bills**	**L** 21–23	3–3	Sun Life Stadium	Recap
8	October 27	at **New England Patriots**	**L** 17–27	3–4	Gillette Stadium	Recap
9	October 31	Cincinnati Bengals	**W** 22–20 (OT)	4–4	Sun Life Stadium	Recap
10	November 11	at Tampa Bay Buccaneers	**L** 19–22	4–5	Raymond James Stadium	Recap
11	November 17	San Diego Chargers	**W** 20–16	5–5	Sun Life Stadium	Recap
12	November 24	Carolina Panthers	**L** 16–20	5–6	Sun Life Stadium	Recap
13	December 1	at **New York Jets**	**W** 23–3	6–6	MetLife Stadium	Recap
14	December 8	at Pittsburgh Steelers	**W** 34–28	7–6	Heinz Field	Recap
15	December 15	**New England Patriots**	**W** 24–20	8–6	Sun Life Stadium	Recap
16	December 22	at **Buffalo Bills**	**L** 0–19	8–7	Ralph Wilson Stadium	Recap
17	December 29	**New York Jets**	**L** 7–20	8–8	Sun Life Stadium	Recap

Note: Intra-division opponents are in bold text.

=== Game summaries ===
==== Week 1: at Cleveland Browns ====
Week One: Miami Dolphins at Cleveland Browns – Game summary

Quarter	1	2	3	4	Total
**Dolphins**	3	3	7	10	**23**
Browns	0	7	3	0	**10**

at FirstEnergy Stadium, Cleveland, Ohio

- Date: September 8
- Game time: 1:00 p.m. EDT
- Game weather: 70 °F (21 °C), sunny
- Game attendance: 71,513
- Referee: Mike Carey
- TV announcers (CBS): Kevin Harlan and Solomon Wilcots
- Recap, Game book

Game information

**First quarter**

- MIA – Caleb Sturgis 45-yard field goal, 1:29. Dolphins 3–0. **Drive: 15 plays, 58 yards, 7:17.**

**Second quarter**

- MIA – Caleb Sturgis 49-yard field goal, 13:37. Dolphins 6–0. **Drive: 4 plays, −4 yards, 1:33.**
- CLE – Jordan Cameron 7-yard pass from Brandon Weeden (Billy Cundiff kick), 0:28. Browns 7–6. **Drive: 11 plays, 56 yards, 3:45.**

**Third quarter**

- MIA – Brian Hartline 34-yard pass from Ryan Tannehill (Caleb Sturgis kick), 6:46. Dolphins 13–7. **Drive: 5 plays, 51 yards, 2:10.**
- CLE – Billy Cundiff 39-yard field goal, 3:02. Dolphins 13–10. **Drive: 9 plays, 59 yards, 3:44.**

**Fourth quarter**

- MIA – Daniel Thomas 1-yard run (Caleb Sturgis kick), 6:48. Dolphins 20–10. **Drive: 10 plays, 85 yards, 5:06.**
- MIA – Caleb Sturgis 36-yard field goal, 3:59. Dolphins 23–10. **Drive: 4 plays, 7 yards, 1:34.**

**Top passers**

- MIA – Ryan Tannehill – 24/38, 272 yards, TD, INT
- CLE – Brandon Weeden – 26/53, 289 yards, TD, 3 INT

**Top rushers**

- MIA – Daniel Thomas – 8 rushes, 14 yards, TD
- CLE – Trent Richardson – 13 rushes, 47 yards

**Top receivers**

- MIA – Brian Hartline – 9 receptions, 114 yards, TD
- CLE – Jordan Cameron – 9 receptions, 108 yards, TD

The Dolphins started their 2013 season on the road against the Browns. They would score first in the 1st quarter as Caleb Sturgis kicked a 45-yard field goal for a 3–0 lead. They led 6–0 in the 2nd quarter after Sturgis kicked a 49-yard field goal. The Browns got on the board and took the lead before halftime as Brandon Weeden found Jordan Cameron on a 7-yard pass for a 7–6 score. After the break, the Dolphins went back to work and took the lead as Ryan Tannehill found Brian Hartline for a 34-yard pass and retook the lead 13–7. The Browns then came within 3 as Billy Cundiff kicked a 39-yard field goal shortening the lead to 13–10. In the 4th quarter it was all Dolphins and Daniel Thomas ran for a 1-yard TD making the score 20–10 while Sturgis kicked a 36-yard field goal for the final score of the game 23–10. It was the Dolphins' first road win over the Browns since 1993.

With the win, the Dolphins began their season 1–0.

==== Week 2: at Indianapolis Colts ====
Week Two: Miami Dolphins at Indianapolis Colts – Game summary

Quarter	1	2	3	4	Total
**Dolphins**	14	3	7	0	**24**
Colts	3	14	3	0	**20**

at Lucas Oil Stadium, Indianapolis, Indiana

- Date: September 15
- Game time: 1:00 p.m. EDT
- Game weather: 72 °F (22 °C), partly cloudy (retractable roof open)
- Game attendance: 65,406
- Referee: Clete Blakeman
- TV announcers (CBS): Ian Eagle and Dan Fouts
- Recap, Game book

Game information

**First quarter**

- MIA – Mike Wallace 18-yard pass from Ryan Tannehill (Caleb Sturgis kick), 9:43. Dolphins 7–0. **Drive: 6 plays, 58 yards, 2:19.**
- IND – Adam Vinatieri 30-yard field goal, 4:07. Dolphins 7–3. **Drive: 12 plays, 69 yards, 5:36.**
- MIA – Lamar Miller 10-yard run (Caleb Sturgis kick), 2:54. Dolphins 14–3. **Drive: 3 plays, 80 yards, 1:13.**

**Second quarter**

- IND – Coby Fleener 3-yard pass from Andrew Luck (Adam Vinatieri kick), 13:01. Dolphins 14–10. **Drive: 10 plays, 80 yards, 4:53.**
- IND – Ahmad Bradshaw 1-yard run (Adam Vinatieri kick), 1:26. Colts 17–14. **Drive: 6 plays, 78 yards, 1:16.**
- MIA – Caleb Sturgis 54-yard field goal, 0:00. Tied 17–17. **Drive: 7 plays, 44 yards, 1:26.**

**Third quarter**

- IND – Adam Vinatieri 38-yard field goal, 11:35. Colts 20–17. **Drive: 6 plays, 19 yards, 2:22.**
- MIA – Charles Clay 1-yard run (Caleb Sturgis kick), 4:40. Dolphins 24–20. **Drive: 6 plays, 69 yards, 2:27.**

**Top passers**

- MIA – Ryan Tannehill – 23/34, 319 yards, TD
- IND – Andrew Luck – 25/43, 321 yards, TD, INT

**Top rushers**

- MIA – Lamar Miller – 14 rushes, 69 yards, TD
- IND – Ahmad Bradshaw – 15 rushes, 65 yards, TD

**Top receivers**

- MIA – Mike Wallace – 9 receptions, 115 yards, TD
- IND – T.Y. Hilton – 6 receptions, 124 yards

The Dolphins traveled to take on the Colts. In the 1st quarter they got off to a fast start as Mike Wallace and Ryan Tannehill connected on an 18-yard TD pass for a 7–0 lead. The Colts got on the board as Adam Vinatieri nailed a 30-yard field goal for a 7–3 score. The Dolphins then increased their lead as Lamar Miller ran for a 10-yard TD making the score 14–3. The Colts would score in the 2nd quarter as Andrew Luck found Coby Fleener on a 3-yard TD pass shortening the lead to 4, 14–10. They eventually grabbed the lead as Ahmad Bradshaw ran for a 1-yard TD, 17–14. Caleb Sturgis of the Dolphins tied it up before halftime with a 54-yard field goal, 17–17. In the 3rd quarter, the Colts retook the lead as Vinatieri nailed a 38-yard field goal for a 20–17 game. The Dolphins then retook the lead as Charles Clay ran for a 1-yard TD for a 24–20 game. The Dolphins then held the Colts scoreless in the 4th quarter and vice versa which eventually gave the team the win as they improved to 2–0 on the season. This was also the Dolphins' first road win over the Colts since 2002.

==== Week 3: vs. Atlanta Falcons ====
Week Three: Atlanta Falcons at Miami Dolphins – Game summary

Quarter	1	2	3	4	Total
Falcons	7	6	7	3	**23**
**Dolphins**	0	10	10	7	**27**

at Sun Life Stadium, Miami Gardens, Florida

- Date: September 22
- Game time: 4:05 p.m. EDT
- Game weather: 89 °F (32 °C), cloudy
- Game attendance: 70,660
- Referee: Ron Winter
- TV announcers (Fox): Chris Myers, Tim Ryan and Jennifer Hale
- Recap, Game book

Game information

**First quarter**

- ATL – Jason Snelling 7-yard pass from Matt Ryan (Matt Bryant kick), 6:12. Falcons 7–0. **Drive: 14 plays, 80 yards, 8:48.**

**Second quarter**

- ATL – Matt Bryant 52-yard field goal, 13:02. Falcons 10–0. **Drive: 11 plays, 42 yards, 5:58.**
- MIA – Daniel Thomas 5-yard run (Caleb Sturgis kick), 10:06. Falcons 10–7. **Drive: 6 plays, 80 yards, 2:58.**
- ATL – Matt Bryant 20-yard field goal, 2:04. Falcons 13–7. **Drive: 13 plays, 78 yards, 8:02.**
- MIA – Caleb Sturgis 46-yard field goal, 0:00. Falcons 13–10. **Drive: 8 plays, 60 yards, 2:04.**

**Third quarter**

- ATL – Levine Toilolo 2-yard pass from Matt Ryan (Matt Bryant kick), 12:40. Falcons 20–10. **Drive: 4 plays, 12 yards, 1:32.**
- MIA – Caleb Sturgis 53-yard field goal, 9:12. Falcons 20–13. **Drive: 9 plays, 47 yards, 3:28.**
- MIA – Brian Hartline 18-yard pass from Ryan Tannehill (Caleb Sturgis kick), 0:56. Tied 20–20. **Drive: 3 plays, 19 yards, 0:49.**

**Fourth quarter**

- ATL – Matt Bryant 33-yard field goal, 11:39. Falcons 23–20. **Drive: 11 plays, 65 yards, 4:17.**
- MIA – Dion Sims 1-yard pass from Ryan Tannehill (Caleb Sturgis kick), 0:38. Dolphins 27–23. **Drive: 13 plays, 75 yards, 4:08.**

**Top passers**

- ATL – Matt Ryan – 23/38, 231 yards, 2 TD, INT
- MIA – Ryan Tannehill – 24/35, 236 yards, 2 TD, INT

**Top rushers**

- ATL – Jacquizz Rodgers – 18 rushes, 86 yards
- MIA – Lamar Miller – 8 rushes, 62 yards

**Top receivers**

- ATL – Julio Jones – 9 receptions, 115 yards
- MIA – Brian Hartline – 4 receptions, 56 yards, TD

The Dolphins went home for their season opener against the Falcons. The Falcons got off to a fast start as Matt Ryan found Jason Snelling on a 7-yard TD pass for a 7–0 lead the only score of the 1st quarter. They would make it 10–0 when Matt Bryant kicked a 52-yard field goal. The Dolphins got on the board when Daniel Thomas ran for a 5-yard TD coming within 3, 10–7. The Falcons then pushed ahead by 6 when Matt Bryant kicked a 30-yard field goal for a 13–7 lead. The Dolphins then wrapped up the scoring when Caleb Sturgis nailed a 46-yard field goal coming within 3 at halftime 13–10. The Falcons increased their lead in the 3rd quarter when Levine Toilolo caught a 2-yard pass from Ryan for a 20–10 lead not long before the Dolphins managed to tie the game at 20 when Sturgis kicked a 50-yard field goal followed up by Tannehill finding Brian Hartline on an 18-yard TD pass. The Falcons moved ahead in the 4th quarter as Bryant kicked a 33-yard field goal for a 23–20 lead but the Dolphins later on would score the game-winning TD when Tannehill found Dion Sims on a 1-yard pass for a final score of 27–23.

With the win, the Dolphins improved to 3–0.

==== Week 4: at New Orleans Saints ====
Week Four: Miami Dolphins at New Orleans Saints – Game summary

Quarter	1	2	3	4	Total
Dolphins	3	7	0	7	**17**
**Saints**	7	14	14	3	**38**

at Mercedes-Benz Superdome, New Orleans, Louisiana

- Date: September 30
- Game time: 8:40 p.m. EDT/7:40 p.m. CDT
- Game weather: Played indoors (dome stadium)
- Game attendance: 73,118
- Referee: Bill Vinovich
- TV announcers (ESPN^{[a]}): Mike Tirico, Jon Gruden and Lisa Salters
- Recap, Game book

Game information

**First quarter**

- NO – Darren Sproles 5-yard run (Garrett Hartley kick), 11:52. Saints 7–0. **Drive: 6 plays, 82 yards, 3:08.**
- MIA – Caleb Sturgis 34-yard field goal, 7:16. Saints 7–3. **Drive: 9 plays, 67 yards, 4:36.**

**Second quarter**

- NO – Jimmy Graham 27-yard pass from Drew Brees (Garrett Hartley kick), 8:01. Saints 14–3. **Drive: 7 plays, 62 yards, 3:47.**
- MIA – Lamar Miller 5-yard run (Caleb Sturgis kick), 3:35. Saints 14–10. **Drive: 8 plays, 81 yards, 4:26.**
- NO – Darren Sproles 13-yard pass from Drew Brees (Garrett Hartley kick), 0:55. Saints 21–10. **Drive: 4 plays, 23 yards, 0:28.**

**Third quarter**

- NO – Benjamin Watson 4-yard pass from Drew Brees (Garrett Hartley kick), 9:44. Saints 28–10. **Drive: 8 plays, 59 yards, 4:23.**
- NO – Jimmy Graham 43-yard pass from Drew Brees (Garrett Hartley kick), 8:12. Saints 35–10. **Drive: 1 play, 43 yards, 0:08.**

**Fourth quarter**

- MIA – Charles Clay 3-yard pass from Ryan Tannehill (Caleb Sturgis kick), 13:48. Saints 35–17. **Drive: 9 plays, 67 yards, 4:05.**
- NO – Garrett Hartley 29-yard field goal, 7:15. Saints 38–17. **Drive: 10 plays, 69 yards, 6:33.**

**Top passers**

- MIA – Ryan Tannehill – 22/35, 249 yards, TD, 3 INT
- NO – Drew Brees – 30/39, 413 yards, 4 TD

**Top rushers**

- MIA – Lamar Miller – 11 rushes, 62 yards, TD
- NO – Khiry Robinson – 12 rushes, 37 yards

**Top receivers**

- MIA – Brandon Gibson – 6 receptions, 71 yards
- NO – Jimmy Graham – 4 receptions, 100 yards, 2 TD

The Dolphins would suffer their first loss of the season as they lost to the New Orleans Saints 38–17 on Monday Night Football and failed to earn their first 4–0 start since 1995.

==== Week 5: vs. Baltimore Ravens ====
Week Five: Baltimore Ravens at Miami Dolphins – Game summary

Quarter	1	2	3	4	Total
**Ravens**	3	3	10	10	**26**
Dolphins	3	10	0	10	**23**

at Sun Life Stadium, Miami Gardens, Florida

- Date: October 6
- Game time: 1:00 p.m. EDT
- Game weather: 87 °F (31 °C), sunny
- Game attendance: 68,342
- Referee: Carl Cheffers
- TV announcers (CBS): Marv Albert and Rich Gannon
- Recap, Game book

Game information

**First quarter**

- BAL – Justin Tucker 42-yard field goal, 10:24. Ravens 3–0. **Drive: 7 plays, 49 yards, 2:29.**
- MIA – Caleb Sturgis 37-yard field goal, 2:16. Tied 3–3. **Drive: 4 plays, 10 yards, 1:29.**

**Second quarter**

- BAL – Justin Tucker 50-yard field goal, 11:52. Ravens 6–3. **Drive: 6 plays, 42 yards, 2:23.**
- MIA – Caleb Sturgis 25-yard field goal, 8:07. Tied 6–6. **Drive: 8 plays, 74 yards, 3:45.**
- MIA – Charles Clay 9-yard pass from Ryan Tannehill (Caleb Sturgis kick), 0:46. Dolphins 13–6. **Drive: 7 plays, 60 yards, 1:09.**

**Third quarter**

- BAL – Ray Rice 2-yard run (Justin Tucker kick), 4:18. Tied 13–13. **Drive: 6 plays, 80 yards, 2:53.**
- BAL – Justin Tucker 25-yard field goal, 4:18. Ravens 16–13. **Drive: 11 plays, 73 yards, 5:54.**

**Fourth quarter**

- BAL – Ray Rice 3-yard run (Justin Tucker kick), 12:06. Ravens 23–13. **Drive: 11 plays, 94 yards, 5:30.**
- MIA – Caleb Sturgis 48-yard field goal, 9:38. Ravens 23–16. **Drive: 7 plays, 50 yards, 2:28.**
- MIA – Reshad Jones 25-yard interception return (Caleb Sturgis kick), 8:03. Tied 23–23.
- BAL – Justin Tucker 44-yard field goal, 1:46. Ravens 26–23. **Drive: 7 plays, 34 yards, 2:25.**

**Top passers**

- BAL – Joe Flacco – 19/32, 269 yards, INT
- MIA – Ryan Tannehill – 21/40, 307 yards, TD

**Top rushers**

- BAL – Ray Rice – 27 rushes, 74 yards, 2 TD
- MIA – Lamar Miller – 7 rushes, 15 yards

**Top receivers**

- BAL – Torrey Smith – 6 receptions, 121 yards
- MIA – Mike Wallace – 7 receptions, 105 yards

Miami would miss a field goal with less than a minute remaining. The miss doomed the Dolphins, as they lost to Baltimore 26–23 in a shootout game.

With the loss, Miami fell to 3–2.

==== Week 7: vs. Buffalo Bills ====
Week Seven: Buffalo Bills at Miami Dolphins – Game summary

Quarter	1	2	3	4	Total
**Bills**	14	3	0	6	**23**
Dolphins	0	14	7	0	**21**

at Sun Life Stadium, Miami Gardens, Florida

- Date: October 20
- Game time: 1:00 p.m. EDT
- Game weather: 87 °F (31 °C), partly cloudy
- Game attendance: 60,592
- Referee: Gene Steratore
- TV announcers (CBS): Bill Macatee and Steve Tasker
- Recap, Game book

Game information

**First quarter**

- BUF – Nickell Robey-Coleman 19-yard interception return (Dan Carpenter kick), 13:27. Bills 7–0.
- BUF – Fred Jackson 3-yard run (Dan Carpenter kick), 5:47. Bills 14–0. **Drive: 6 plays, 44 yards, 2:35.**

**Second quarter**

- MIA – Charles Clay 7-yard pass from Ryan Tannehill (Caleb Sturgis kick), 10:59. Bills 14–7. **Drive: 6 plays, 62 yards, 3:23.**
- BUF – Dan Carpenter 39-yard field goal, 3:14. Bills 17–7. **Drive: 8 plays, 38 yards, 2:36.**
- MIA – Brandon Gibson 13-yard pass from Ryan Tannehill (Caleb Sturgis kick), 0:21. Bills 17–14. **Drive: 5 plays, 75 yards, 1:04.**

**Third quarter**

- MIA – Brandon Gibson 4-yard pass from Ryan Tannehill (Caleb Sturgis kick), 6:46. Dolphins 21–17. **Drive: 11 plays, 66 yards, 6:43.**

**Fourth quarter**

- BUF – Dan Carpenter 20-yard field goal, 14:16. Dolphins 21–20. **Drive: 15 plays, 72 yards, 7:30.**
- BUF – Dan Carpenter 31-yard field goal, 0:33. Bills 23–21. **Drive: 7 plays, 21 yards, 2:15.**

**Top passers**

- BUF – Thaddeus Lewis – 21/32, 202 yards, INT
- MIA – Ryan Tannehill – 19/37, 194 yards, 3 TD, 2 INT

**Top rushers**

- BUF – Fred Jackson – 11 rushes, 36 yards, TD
- MIA – Daniel Thomas – 12 rushes, 60 yards

**Top receivers**

- BUF – Stevie Johnson – 6 receptions, 61 yards
- MIA – Mike Wallace – 5 receptions, 76 yards

With their third straight loss, Miami fell to 3–3 after starting 3–0.

==== Week 8: at New England Patriots ====
Week Eight: Miami Dolphins at New England Patriots – Game summary

Quarter	1	2	3	4	Total
Dolphins	7	10	0	0	**17**
**Patriots**	0	3	17	7	**27**

at Gillette Stadium, Foxborough, Massachusetts

- Date: October 27
- Game time: 1:00 p.m. EDT
- Game weather: 53 °F (12 °C), partly cloudy
- Game attendance: 68,756
- Referee: Walt Anderson
- TV announcers (CBS): Jim Nantz and Phil Simms
- Recap, Game book

Game information

**First quarter**

- MIA – Brandon Gibson 4-yard pass from Ryan Tannehill (Caleb Sturgis kick), 6:32. Dolphins 7–0. **Drive: 11 plays, 40 yards, 5:42.**

**Second quarter**

- MIA – Daniel Thomas 5-yard pass from Ryan Tannehill (Caleb Sturgis kick), 9:55. Dolphins 14–0. **Drive: 10 plays, 58 yards, 4:31.**
- NE – Stephen Gostkowski 34-yard field goal, 3:43. Dolphins 14–3. **Drive: 13 plays, 64 yards, 6:12.**
- MIA – Caleb Sturgis 52-yard field goal, 0:30. Dolphins 17–3. **Drive: 8 plays, 46 yards, 3:13.**

**Third quarter**

- NE – Aaron Dobson 14-yard pass from Tom Brady (Stephen Gostkowski kick), 8:28. Dolphins 17–10. **Drive: 5 plays, 64 yards, 1:45.**
- NE – Brandon Bolden 2-yard run (Stephen Gostkowski kick), 6:42. Tied 17–17. **Drive: 3 plays, 13 yards, 1:01.**
- NE – Stephen Gostkowski 48-yard field goal, 0:08. Patriots 20–17. **Drive: 8 plays, 37 yards, 2:16.**

**Fourth quarter**

- NE – Stevan Ridley 3-yard run (Stephen Gostkowski kick), 7:14. Patriots 27–17. **Drive: 12 plays, 82 yards, 5:56.**

**Top passers**

- MIA – Ryan Tannehill – 22/42, 192 yards, 2 TD, 2 INT
- NE – Tom Brady – 13/22, 116 yards, TD, INT

**Top rushers**

- MIA – Lamar Miller – 18 rushes, 89 yards
- NE – Stevan Ridley – 14 rushes, 79 yards, TD

**Top receivers**

- MIA – Mike Wallace – 3 receptions, 41 yards
- NE – Aaron Dobson – 4 receptions, 60 yards, TD

With the loss, the Dolphins fell to 3–4.

==== Week 9: vs. Cincinnati Bengals ====
Week Nine: Cincinnati Bengals at Miami Dolphins – Game summary

Quarter	1	2	3	4	OT	Total
Bengals	0	3	7	10	0	**20**
**Dolphins**	0	10	7	3	2	**22**

at Sun Life Stadium, Miami Gardens, Florida

- Date: October 31
- Game time: 8:25 p.m. EDT
- Game weather: 79 °F (26 °C), partly cloudy
- Game attendance: 52,388
- Referee: Bill Leavy
- TV announcers (NFLN^{[b]}): Brad Nessler, Mike Mayock and Alex Flanagan
- Recap, Game book

Game information

**First quarter**

- No scoring plays.

**Second quarter**

- CIN – Mike Nugent 31-yard field goal, 11:56. Bengals 3–0. **Drive: 14 plays, 63 yards, 5:57.**
- MIA – Ryan Tannehill 1-yard run (Caleb Sturgis kick), 2:39. Dolphins 7–3. **Drive: 11 plays, 93 yards, 5:51.**
- MIA – Caleb Sturgis 36-yard field goal, 0:06. Dolphins 10–3. **Drive: 5 plays, 22 yards, 0:22.**

**Third quarter**

- MIA – Brent Grimes 94-yard interception return (Caleb Sturgis kick), 7:37. Dolphins 17–3.
- CIN – Giovani Bernard 3-yard run (Mike Nugent kick), 2:10. Dolphins 17–10. **Drive: 12 plays, 80 yards, 5:27.**

**Fourth quarter**

- CIN – Giovani Bernard 35-yard run (Mike Nugent kick), 12:37. Tied 17–17. **Drive: 4 plays, 70 yards, 2:15.**
- CIN – Mike Nugent 54-yard field goal, 1:24. Bengals 20–17. **Drive: 9 plays, 35 yards, 1:43.**
- MIA – Caleb Sturgis 44-yard field goal, 0:00. Tied 20–20. **Drive: 9 plays, 50 yards, 1:13.**

**Overtime**

- MIA – Andy Dalton sacked in endzone by Cameron Wake for a safety, 6:38. Dolphins 22–20.

**Top passers**

- CIN – Andy Dalton – 32/58, 338 yards, 3 INT
- MIA – Ryan Tannehill – 20/28, 208 yards

**Top rushers**

- CIN – Giovani Bernard – 9 rushes, 79 yards, 2 TD
- MIA – Lamar Miller – 16 rushes, 105 yards

**Top receivers**

- CIN – A. J. Green – 11 receptions, 128 yards
- MIA – Mike Wallace – 6 receptions, 82 yards

The Dolphins would force four turnovers in this game as they beat Cincinnati 22–20 in overtime on Thursday Night Football. The game ended with a safety in overtime on a sack on Andy Dalton in the end zone by Cameron Wake. It was the first time since Adewale Ogunleye tackled Fred Miller in Miller's own end zone on November 14, 2004, a game ended on a safety in overtime.

With the win, the Dolphins evened their record at 4–4.

==== Week 10: at Tampa Bay Buccaneers ====
Week Ten: Miami Dolphins at Tampa Bay Buccaneers – Game summary

Quarter	1	2	3	4	Total
Dolphins	0	7	12	0	**19**
**Buccaneers**	10	5	0	7	**22**

at Raymond James Stadium, Tampa, Florida

- Date: November 11
- Game time: 8:40 p.m. EST
- Game weather: 73 °F (23 °C), sunny
- Game attendance: 64,448
- Referee: Jeff Triplette
- TV announcers (ESPN^{[a]}): Mike Tirico, Jon Gruden and Lisa Salters
- Recap, Game book

Game information

**First quarter**

- TB – Donald Penn 1-yard pass from Mike Glennon (Rian Lindell kick), 9:37. Buccaneers 7–0. **Drive: 9 plays, 76 yards, 5:23.**
- TB – Rian Lindell 24-yard field goal, 5:27. Buccaneers 10–0. **Drive: 6 plays, 34 yards, 2:40.**

**Second quarter**

- TB – Daniel Thomas tackled in the end zone by Lavonte David for a safety, 13:52. Buccaneers 12–0.
- TB – Rian Lindell 35-yard field goal, 9:01. Buccaneers 15–0. **Drive: 8 plays, 41 yards, 4:51.**
- MIA – Rishard Matthews 6-yard pass from Ryan Tannehill (Caleb Sturgis kick), 0:28. Buccaneers 15–7. **Drive: 9 plays, 90 yards, 3:26.**

**Third quarter**

- MIA – Caleb Sturgis 40-yard field goal, 7:57. Buccaneers 15–10. **Drive: 4 plays, 7 yards, 1:33.**
- MIA – Rishard Matthews 19-yard pass from Ryan Tannehill (pass failed), 2:01. Dolphins 16–15. **Drive: 5 plays, 41 yards, 2:06.**
- MIA – Caleb Sturgis 30-yard field goal, 0:10. Dolphins 19–15. **Drive: 4 plays, −5 yards, 1:24.**

**Fourth quarter**

- TB – Bobby Rainey 1-yard run (Rian Lindell kick), 10:19. Buccaneers 22–19. **Drive: 9 plays, 80 yards, 4:51.**

**Top passers**

- MIA – Ryan Tannehill – 27/42, 229 yards, 2 TD, INT
- TB – Mike Glennon – 11/21, 139 yards, TD, INT

**Top rushers**

- MIA – Ryan Tannehill – 1 rush, 2 yards
- TB – Brian Leonard – 20 rushes, 57 yards

**Top receivers**

- MIA – Rishard Matthews – 11 receptions, 120 yards, 2 TD
- TB – Tiquan Underwood – 3 receptions, 64 yards

Tampa Bay came into this game having not won a game, at 0–8. The Dolphins would trail 15–0 for most of the first 2 quarters, but they would score 19 unanswered points from the end of the second quarter through most of the third to take a 19–15 lead. However, the Buccaneers would take the lead for good when they scored a touchdown early in the fourth quarter to go up 22–19, which would be the final score, thus giving the Buccaneers their first win of the season. The Dolphins were also seeking their first win in Tampa since 1988.

With the bitter loss, the Dolphins fell to 4–5.

==== Week 11: vs. San Diego Chargers ====
Week Eleven: San Diego Chargers at Miami Dolphins – Game summary

Quarter	1	2	3	4	Total
Chargers	7	3	6	0	**16**
**Dolphins**	3	7	7	3	**20**

at Sun Life Stadium, Miami Gardens, Florida

- Date: November 17
- Game time: 4:05 p.m. EST
- Game weather: 81 °F (27 °C), cloudy
- Game attendance: 60,256
- Referee: Pete Morelli
- TV announcers (CBS): Greg Gumbel and Dan Dierdorf
- Recap, Game book

Game information

**First quarter**

- MIA – Caleb Sturgis 22-yard field goal, 9:13. Dolphins 3–0. **Drive: 11 plays, 76 yards, 5:47.**
- SD – Antonio Gates 5-yard pass from Philip Rivers (Nick Novak kick), 0:18. Chargers 7–3. **Drive: 4 plays, 49 yards, 2:17.**

**Second quarter**

- MIA – Daniel Thomas 1-yard run (Caleb Sturgis kick), 9:43. Dolphins 10–7. **Drive: 9 plays, 80 yards, 5:35.**
- SD – Nick Novak 27-yard field goal, 0:54. Tied 10–10. **Drive: 8 plays, 50 yards, 2:45.**

**Third quarter**

- MIA – Charles Clay 39-yard pass from Ryan Tannehill (Caleb Sturgis kick), 7:43. Dolphins 17–10. **Drive: 5 plays, 80 yards, 2:36.**
- SD – Nick Novak 50-yard field goal, 4:00. Dolphins 17–13. **Drive: 8 plays, 48 yards, 3:43.**

**Fourth quarter**

- SD – Nick Novak 29-yard field goal, 14:52. Dolphins 17–16. **Drive: 5 plays, 56 yards, 1:56.**
- MIA – Caleb Sturgis 37-yard field goal, 8:34. Dolphins 20–16. **Drive: 8 plays, 41 yards, 3:17.**

**Top passers**

- SD – Philip Rivers – 22/34, 298 yards, TD, INT
- MIA – Ryan Tannehill – 22/35, 268 yards, TD, INT

**Top rushers**

- SD – Ryan Mathews – 19 rushes, 127 yards
- MIA – Daniel Thomas – 10 rushes, 57 yards, TD

**Top receivers**

- SD – Ladarius Green – 4 receptions, 81 yards
- MIA – Charles Clay – 6 receptions, 90 yards, TD

With the win, the Dolphins improved to 5–5.

==== Week 12: vs. Carolina Panthers ====
Week Twelve: Carolina Panthers at Miami Dolphins – Game summary

Quarter	1	2	3	4	Total
**Panthers**	3	3	7	7	**20**
Dolphins	7	9	0	0	**16**

at Sun Life Stadium, Miami Gardens, Florida

- Date: November 24
- Game time: 1:00 p.m. EST
- Game weather: 82 °F (28 °C), cloudy
- Game attendance: 60,156
- Referee: Scott Green
- TV announcers (Fox): Chris Myers, Tim Ryan and Jennifer Hale
- Recap, Game book

Game information

**First quarter**

- CAR – Graham Gano 52-yard field goal, 6:58. Panthers 3–0. **Drive: 5 plays, 8 yards, 2:15.**
- MIA – Mike Wallace 53-yard pass from Ryan Tannehill (Caleb Sturgis kick), 5:39. Dolphins 7–3. **Drive: 3 plays, 77 yards, 1:19.**

**Second quarter**

- MIA – Caleb Sturgis 32-yard field goal, 12:34. Dolphins 10–3. **Drive: 5 plays, 65 yards, 2:14.**
- MIA – Caleb Sturgis 47-yard field goal, 2:13. Dolphins 13–3. **Drive: 5 plays, 28 yards, 2:10.**
- MIA – Caleb Sturgis 23-yard field goal, 1:01. Dolphins 16–3. **Drive: 4 plays, 6 yards, 1:00.**
- CAR – Graham Gano 46-yard field goal, 0:00. Dolphins 16–6. **Drive: 8 plays, 52 yards, 1:01.**

**Third quarter**

- CAR – Cam Newton 5-yard run (Graham Gano kick), 8:08. Dolphins 16–13. **Drive: 14 plays, 83 yards, 6:52.**

**Fourth quarter**

- CAR – Greg Olsen 1-yard pass from Cam Newton (Graham Gano kick), 0:43. Panthers 20–16. **Drive: 12 plays, 80 yards, 3:30.**

**Top passers**

- CAR – Cam Newton – 19/38 yards, 174 yards, TD, INT
- MIA – Ryan Tannehill – 28/42, 310 yards, TD, INT

**Top rushers**

- CAR – Cam Newton – 7 rushes, 51 yards, TD
- MIA – Ryan Tannehill – 4 rushes, 36 yards

**Top receivers**

- CAR – Steve Smith Sr. – 5 receptions, 69 yards
- MIA – Mike Wallace – 5 receptions, 127 yards, TD

Miami would build a 16–3 lead at one point. But the Panthers would rally behind Cam Newton to score a touchdown with less than a minute left. For the first time in franchise history, the Dolphins were defeated by the Panthers, as they had come into this game 4–0 all time against them.

With the loss, the Dolphins fell to 5–6.

==== Week 13: at New York Jets ====
Week Thirteen: Miami Dolphins at New York Jets – Game summary

Quarter	1	2	3	4	Total
**Dolphins**	0	6	14	3	**23**
Jets	0	0	3	0	**3**

at MetLife Stadium, East Rutherford, New Jersey

- Date: December 1
- Game time: 1:00 p.m. EST
- Game weather: 48 °F (9 °C), partly cloudy
- Game attendance: 76,957
- Referee: Mike Carey
- TV announcers (CBS): Marv Albert and Rich Gannon
- Recap, Game book

Game information

**First quarter**

- No scoring plays.

**Second quarter**

- MIA – Caleb Sturgis 34-yard field goal, 0:44. Dolphins 3–0. **Drive: 7 plays, 38 yards, 0:51.**
- MIA – Caleb Sturgis 43-yard field goal, 0:05. Dolphins 6–0. **Drive: 4 plays, 19 yards, 0:17.**

**Third quarter**

- MIA – Brian Hartline 31-yard pass from Ryan Tannehill (Caleb Sturgis kick), 9:42. Dolphins 13–0. **Drive: 2 plays, 48 yards, 0:26.**
- NYJ – Nick Folk 20-yard field goal, 4:30. Dolphins 13–3. **Drive: 11 plays, 64 yards, 5:12.**
- MIA – Mike Wallace 28-yard pass from Ryan Tannehill (Caleb Sturgis kick), 1:02. Dolphins 20–3. **Drive: 6 plays, 56 yards, 3:28.**

**Fourth quarter**

- MIA – Caleb Sturgis 18-yard field goal, 5:59. Dolphins 23–3. **Drive: 11 plays, 60 yards, 6:15.**

**Top passers**

- MIA – Ryan Tannehill – 28/43, 331 yards, 2 TD, INT
- NYJ – Matt Simms – 9/18, 79 yards, INT

**Top rushers**

- MIA – Lamar Miller – 22 rushes, 72 yards
- NYJ – Chris Ivory – 12 rushes, 61 yards

**Top receivers**

- MIA – Brian Hartline – 9 receptions, 127 yards, TD
- NYJ – David Nelson – 3 receptions, 37 yards

With the commanding win, the Dolphins evened their record at 6–6.

==== Week 14: at Pittsburgh Steelers ====
Week Fourteen: Miami Dolphins at Pittsburgh Steelers – Game summary

Quarter	1	2	3	4	Total
**Dolphins**	3	7	14	10	**34**
Steelers	7	0	14	7	**28**

at Heinz Field, Pittsburgh, Pennsylvania

- Date: December 8
- Game time: 1:00 p.m. EST
- Game weather: 25 °F (−4 °C), light snow
- Game attendance: 52,489
- Referee: John Parry
- TV announcers (CBS): Ian Eagle and Dan Fouts
- Recap, Game book

Game information

**First quarter**

- PIT – Emmanuel Sanders 5-yard pass from Ben Roethlisberger (Shaun Suisham kick), 4:20. Steelers 7–0. **Drive: 12 plays, 74 yards, 7:05.**
- MIA – Caleb Sturgis 30-yard field goal, 0:40. Steelers 7–3. **Drive: 8 plays, 64 yards, 3:40.**

**Second quarter**

- MIA – Charles Clay 6-yard pass from Ryan Tannehill (Caleb Sturgis kick), 8:15. Dolphins 10–7. **Drive: 5 plays, 31 yards, 2:29.**

**Third quarter**

- MIA – Daniel Thomas 4-yard run (Caleb Sturgis kick), 10:15. Dolphins 17–7. **Drive: 9 plays, 80 yards, 4:10.**
- PIT – Antonio Brown 43-yard pass from Ben Roethlisberger (Shaun Suisham kick), 8:58. Dolphins 17–14. **Drive: 4 plays, 83 yards, 1:52.**
- PIT – Troy Polamalu 19-yard interception return (Shaun Suisham kick), 8:05. Steelers 21–17.
- MIA – Brian Hartline 4-yard pass from Ryan Tannehill (Caleb Sturgis kick), 4:52. Dolphins 24–21. **Drive: 7 plays, 71 yards, 3:13.**

**Fourth quarter**

- PIT – Jerricho Cotchery 16-yard pass from Ben Roethlisberger (Shaun Suisham kick), 14:56. Steelers 28–24. **Drive: 11 plays, 78 yards, 4:56.**
- MIA – Charles Clay 12-yard pass from Ryan Tannehill (Caleb Sturgis kick), 2:53. Dolphins 31–28. **Drive: 4 plays, 80 yards, 1:38.**
- MIA – Caleb Sturgis 27-yard field goal, 1:08. Dolphins 34–28. **Drive: 4 plays, 0 yards, 1:15.**

**Top passers**

- MIA – Ryan Tannehill – 20/33, 200 yards, 3 TD, INT
- PIT – Ben Roethlisberger – 23/39, 349 yards, 3 TD

**Top rushers**

- MIA – Daniel Thomas – 16 rushes, 105 yards, TD
- PIT – Le'Veon Bell – 15 rushes, 61 yards

**Top receivers**

- MIA – Charles Clay – 7 receptions, 97 yards, 2 TD
- PIT – Antonio Brown – 5 receptions, 138 yards, TD

In a game filled with snow similar to the Snowplow Game, the Dolphins would upset the Steelers 34–28 to keep their playoff hopes alive. The game is notable for the final play, in which the Steelers lateralled the ball 7 times, with the final lateral pass being caught by Antonio Brown in stride. Brown then sprinted down the sidelines, avoided several tackles, and sprinted into the endzone for an apparent game-winning touchdown. However, most noticeable on replay, Brown barely stepped out of bounds, with the left half of his foot barely touching the sideline. With the win, the Dolphins improved to 7–6. It was also the Dolphins' first win in Pittsburgh since 1990.

==== Week 15: vs. New England Patriots ====
Week Fifteen: New England Patriots at Miami Dolphins – Game summary

Quarter	1	2	3	4	Total
Patriots	3	7	0	10	**20**
**Dolphins**	0	7	3	14	**24**

at Sun Life Stadium, Miami Gardens, Florida

- Date: December 15
- Game time: 1:00 p.m. EST
- Game weather: 84 °F (29 °C), partly cloudy
- Game attendance: 71,863
- Referee: Tony Corrente
- TV announcers (CBS): Jim Nantz and Phil Simms
- Recap, Game book

Game information

**First quarter**

- NE – Stephen Gostkowski 22-yard field goal, 3:53. Patriots 3–0. **Drive: 16 plays, 83 yards, 7:13.**

**Second quarter**

- NE – Michael Hoomanawanui 13-yard pass from Tom Brady (Stephen Gostkowski kick), 1:38. Patriots 10–0. **Drive: 7 plays, 69 yards, 1:57.**
- MIA – Mike Wallace 39-yard pass from Ryan Tannehill (Caleb Sturgis kick), 0:32. Patriots 10–7. **Drive: 8 plays, 82 yards, 1:06.**

**Third quarter**

- MIA – Caleb Sturgis 32-yard field goal, 7:31. Tied 10–10. **Drive: 8 plays, 48 yards, 3:43.**

**Fourth quarter**

- MIA – Daniel Thomas 2-yard pass from Ryan Tannehill (Caleb Sturgis kick), 14:54. Dolphins 17–10. **Drive: 10 plays, 66 yards, 5:11.**
- NE – Stephen Gostkowski 23-yard field goal, 7:45. Dolphins 17–13. **Drive: 15 plays, 81 yards, 7:09.**
- NE – Julian Edelman 24-yard pass from Tom Brady (Stephen Gostkowski kick), 4:07. Patriots 20–17. **Drive: 6 plays, 73 yards, 2:36.**
- MIA – Marcus Thigpen 14-yard pass from Ryan Tannehill (Caleb Sturgis kick), 1:15. Dolphins 24–20. **Drive: 9 plays, 60 yards, 2:52.**

**Top passers**

- NE – Tom Brady – 34/55, 364 yards, 2 TD, INT
- MIA – Ryan Tannehill – 25/37, 312 yards, 3 TD

**Top rushers**

- NE – LeGarrette Blount – 11 rushes, 47 yards
- MIA – Lamar Miller – 15 rushes, 61 yards

**Top receivers**

- NE – Julian Edelman – 13 receptions, 139 yards, TD
- MIA – Mike Wallace – 6 receptions, 105 yards, TD

With the win, the Dolphins improved to 8–6 and climbed to the second Wild Card seat; however, with the Ravens' victory over the Lions the following night, the team went back to the seventh spot in the playoff hunt.

==== Week 16: at Buffalo Bills ====
Week Sixteen: Miami Dolphins at Buffalo Bills – Game summary

Quarter	1	2	3	4	Total
Dolphins	0	0	0	0	**0**
**Bills**	3	7	0	9	**19**

at Ralph Wilson Stadium, Orchard Park, New York

- Date: December 22
- Game time: 1:00 p.m. EST
- Game weather: 41 °F (5 °C), cloudy with mist
- Game attendance: 54,305
- Referee: Clete Blakeman
- TV announcers (CBS): Spero Dedes and Steve Beuerlein
- Recap, Game book

Game information

**First quarter**

- BUF – Dan Carpenter 45-yard field goal, 6:42. Bills 3–0. **Drive: 6 plays, 68 yards, 1:46.**

**Second quarter**

- BUF – Fred Jackson 9-yard run (Dan Carpenter kick), 13:18. Bills 10–0. **Drive: 9 plays, 57 yards, 4:47.**

**Third quarter**

- No scoring plays.

**Fourth quarter**

- BUF – Dan Carpenter 21-yard field goal, 12:01. Bills 13–0. **Drive: 19 plays, 92 yards, 9:16.**
- BUF – Dan Carpenter 22-yard field goal, 6:43. Bills 16–0. **Drive: 7 plays, 44 yards, 3:48.**
- BUF – Dan Carpenter 26-yard field goal, 2:26. Bills 19–0. **Drive: 4 plays, 9 yards, 2:18.**

**Top passers**

- MIA – Ryan Tannehill – 10/27, 82 yards
- BUF – EJ Manuel – 15/25, 193 yards, INT

**Top rushers**

- MIA – Lamar Miller – 3 rushes, 8 yards
- BUF – Fred Jackson – 18 rushes, 105 yards, TD

**Top receivers**

- MIA – Brian Hartline – 2 receptions, 53 yards
- BUF – Robert Woods – 3 receptions, 70 yards

With the shutout loss, the Dolphins fell to 8–7 and put their playoff hopes on the line. This was the first time the Dolphins had been shoutout since week 17 of last year against the Patriots.

==== Week 17: vs. New York Jets ====
Week Seventeen: New York Jets at Miami Dolphins – Game summary

Quarter	1	2	3	4	Total
**Jets**	0	14	0	6	**20**
Dolphins	0	7	0	0	**7**

at Sun Life Stadium, Miami Gardens, Florida

- Date: December 29
- Game time: 1:00 p.m. EST
- Game weather: 79 °F (26 °C), cloudy
- Game attendance: 70,296
- Referee: Jerome Boger
- TV announcers (CBS): Greg Gumbel and Dan Dierdorf
- Recap, Game book

Game information

**First quarter**

- No scoring plays.

**Second quarter**

- MIA – Mike Wallace 5-yard pass from Ryan Tannehill (Caleb Sturgis kick), 11:51. Dolphins 7–0. **Drive: 14 plays, 89 yards, 6:56.**
- NYJ – Sheldon Richardson 1-yard run (Nick Folk kick), 3:20. Tied 7–7. **Drive: 10 plays, 71 yards, 5:20.**
- NYJ – Geno Smith 7-yard run (Nick Folk kick), 0:03. Jets 14–7. **Drive: 11 plays, 80 yards, 2:18.**

**Third quarter**

- No scoring plays.

**Fourth quarter**

- NYJ – Nick Folk 35-yard field goal, 4:18. Jets 17–7. **Drive: 9 plays, 63 yards, 5:00.**
- NYJ – Nick Folk 26-yard field goal, 2:59. Jets 20–7. **Drive: 4 plays, 5 yards, 1:00.**

**Top passers**

- NYJ – Geno Smith – 17/27, 190 yards
- MIA – Ryan Tannehill – 20/40, 204 yards, TD, 3 INT

**Top rushers**

- NYJ – Bilal Powell – 21 rushes, 76 yards
- MIA – Lamar Miller – 17 rushes, 73 yards

**Top receivers**

- NYJ – David Nelson – 5 receptions, 66 yards
- MIA – Rishard Matthews – 4 receptions, 58 yards

With the loss, the Dolphins finished the season with an 8–8 record and were eliminated from playoff contention.

== Standings ==
=== Division ===
AFC East
	W	L	T	PCT	DIV	CONF	PF	PA	STK
^{(2)} New England Patriots	12	4	0	.750	4–2	9–3	444	338	W2
New York Jets	8	8	0	.500	3–3	5–7	290	387	W2
Miami Dolphins	8	8	0	.500	2–4	7–5	317	335	L2
Buffalo Bills	6	10	0	.375	3–3	5–7	339	388	L1

=== Conference ===
AFC
#	Team	Division	W	L	T	PCT	DIV	CONF	SOS	SOV	STK
Division winners
1	Denver Broncos	West	13	3	0	.813	5–1	9–3	.469	.423	W2
2	New England Patriots	East	12	4	0	.750	4–2	9–3	.473	.427	W2
3 (Note: Cincinnati defeated Indianapolis head-to-head (Week 14, 42–28).)	Cincinnati Bengals	North	11	5	0	.688	3–3	8–4	.480	.494	W2
4	Indianapolis Colts	South	11	5	0	.688	6–0	9–3	.484	.449	W3
Wild cards
5	Kansas City Chiefs	West	11	5	0	.688	2–4	7–5	.445	.335	L2
6	San Diego Chargers	West	9	7	0	.563	4–2	6–6	.496	.549	W4
Did not qualify for the postseason
7 (Note: Pittsburgh finished with a better division record than Baltimore.) (Note: Pittsburgh defeated the New York Jets head-to-head (Week 6, 19–6).)	Pittsburgh Steelers	North	8	8	0	.500	4–2	6–6	.469	.441	W3
8 (Note: Baltimore defeated the New York Jets head-to-head (Week 12, 19–3).)	Baltimore Ravens	North	8	8	0	.500	3–3	6–6	.484	.418	L2
9 (Note: The New York Jets finished with a better division record than Miami.)	New York Jets	East	8	8	0	.500	3–3	5–7	.488	.414	W2
10	Miami Dolphins	East	8	8	0	.500	2–4	7–5	.523	.523	L2
11	Tennessee Titans	South	7	9	0	.438	2–4	6–6	.504	.375	W2
12	Buffalo Bills	East	6	10	0	.375	3–3	5–7	.520	.500	L1
13 (Note: Oakland and Jacksonville finished with a better conference record than Cleveland.) (Note: Oakland defeated Jacksonville head-to-head (Week 2, 19–9).)	Oakland Raiders	West	4	12	0	.250	1–5	4–8	.523	.359	L6
14 (Note: Jacksonville defeated Cleveland head-to-head (Week 13, 32–28).)	Jacksonville Jaguars	South	4	12	0	.250	3–3	4–8	.504	.234	L3
15	Cleveland Browns	North	4	12	0	.250	2–4	3–9	.516	.477	L7
16	Houston Texans	South	2	14	0	.125	1–5	2–10	.559	.500	L14
Tiebreakers (Note: When breaking ties for three or more teams under the NFL's rules, they are first broken within divisions, then comparing only the highest ranked remaining team from each division.)
