= Chris Clemons (safety) =

American football player (born 1985)

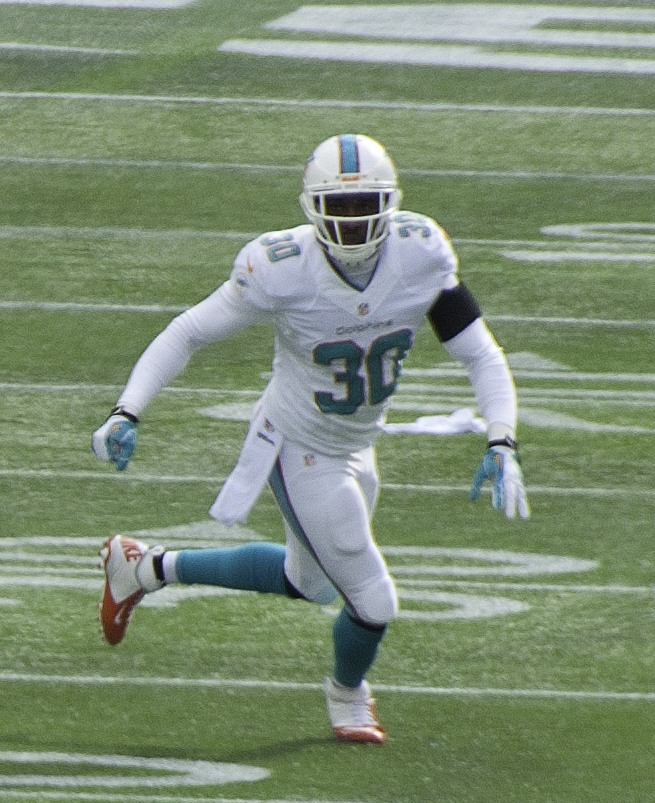
- Clemons with the Miami Dolphins in 2013

No. 30, 29
- Position: Safety

Personal information
- Born: September 15, 1985 (age 41); Bradenton, Florida, U.S.
- Listed height: 6 ft 1 in (1.85 m)
- Listed weight: 215 lb (98 kg)

Career information
- High school: DeSoto (Arcadia, Florida)
- College: Clemson
- NFL draft: 2009: 5th round, 165th overall pick

Career history
- Miami Dolphins (2009–2013); Houston Texans (2014)*; Arizona Cardinals (2014–2015)
- * Offseason or practice squad member only

Career NFL statistics
- Total tackles: 284
- Sacks: 1.5
- Forced fumbles: 2
- Fumble recoveries: 3
- Interceptions: 4
- Stats at Pro Football Reference

Christian Donovan Clemons (born September 15, 1985) is an American former professional football player who was a safety in the National Football League (NFL). He was selected by the Miami Dolphins in the fifth round of the 2009 NFL draft. He played college football for the Clemson Tigers.

== Early life ==
Clemons attended DeSoto County High School in his hometown of Arcadia, Florida. He graduated in 2004.

== Professional career ==
Pre-draft measurables
Height	Weight	Arm length	Hand span	40-yard dash	10-yard split	20-yard split	20-yard shuttle	Three-cone drill	Vertical jump	Broad jump	Bench press
6 ft 0 1/8 in (1.83 m)	208 lb (94 kg)	32 3/4 in (0.83 m)	9 5/8 in (0.24 m)	4.41 s	1.51 s	2.55 s	4.38 s	7.27 s	37.5 in (0.95 m)	10 ft 7 in (3.23 m)	19 reps
All values from NFL Combine

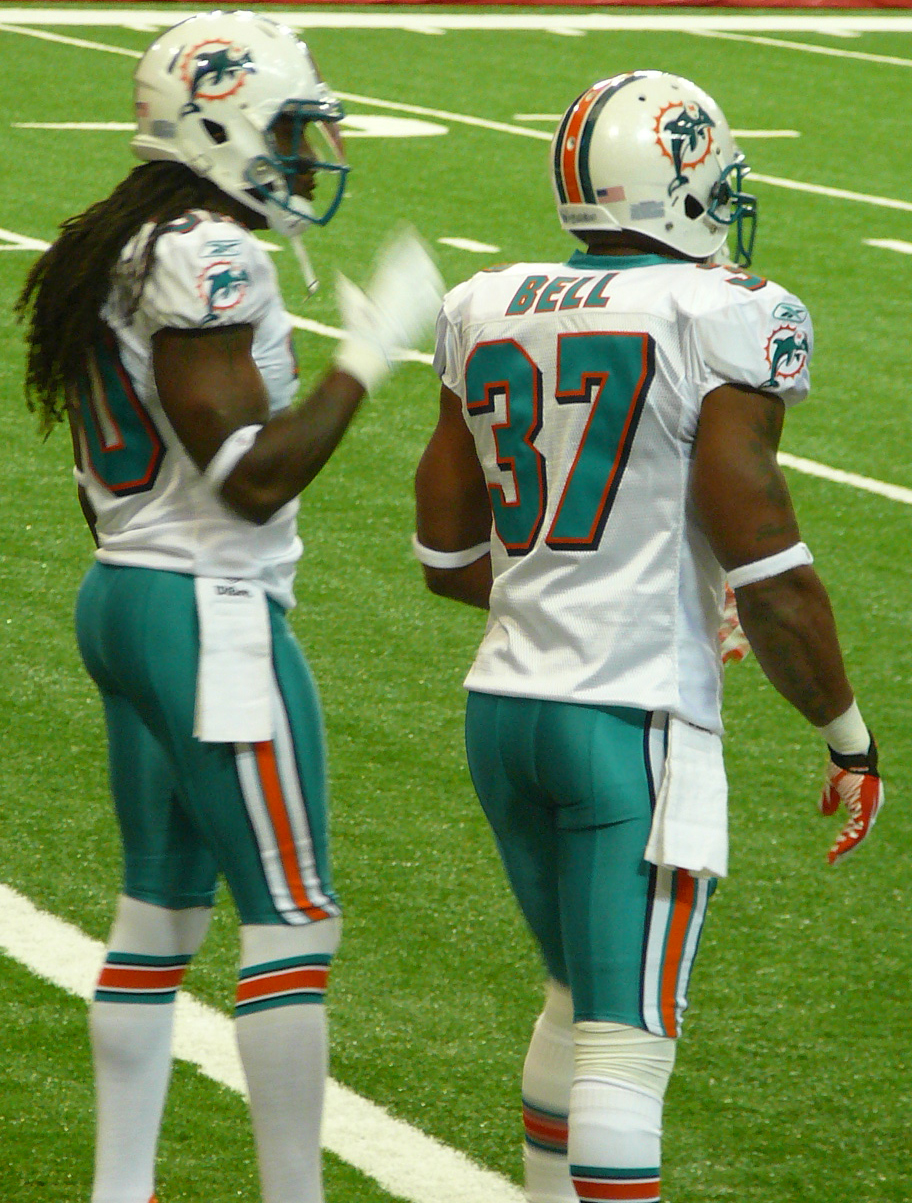
Clemons (left) with fellow Dolphins starter Yeremiah Bell in 2011.

=== Miami Dolphins ===
Clemons was selected by the Miami Dolphins in the fifth round of the 2009 NFL draft with the 165th overall pick. In Week 12 against the Oakland Raiders, Clemons recorded his first career interception in a 33-17 victory.

Set to become an unrestricted free agent for 2013 season, Clemons re-signed with the Dolphins on a one-year contract on March 12, 2013.

=== Houston Texans ===
On March 26, 2014, Clemons agreed to terms on a two-year contract with the Houston Texans. He was released on August 31, 2014.

=== Arizona Cardinals ===
Clemons signed with the Arizona Cardinals on December 8, 2014.

On October 9, 2015, after reaching an injury settlement, Clemons was released by the Cardinals. On December 22, 2015, Clemons was re-signed by the Cardinals after free safety Tyrann Mathieu went down with a season-ending ACL injury.

On September 3, 2016, Clemons was released by the Cardinals.

== NFL career statistics ==
Legend
**Bold**	Career high

=== Regular season ===
Year	Team	Games		Tackles					Interceptions					Fumbles			
Year	Team	GP	GS	Cmb	Solo	Ast	Sck	TFL	Int	Yds	TD	Lng	PD	FF	FR	Yds	TD
2009	MIA	11	2	14	11	3	0.0	0	0	0	0	0	0	0	0	0	0
2010	MIA	15	14	61	51	10	**1.5**	**5**	1	0	0	0	5	**2**	**1**	0	0
2011	MIA	14	0	13	11	2	0.0	1	0	0	0	0	0	0	0	0	0
2012	MIA	**16**	**16**	**98**	**72**	26	0.0	3	**2**	**29**	0	**29**	4	0	**1**	-3	0
2013	MIA	**16**	**16**	93	63	**30**	0.0	1	1	0	0	0	**8**	0	0	0	0
2014	ARI	1	0	0	0	0	0.0	0	0	0	0	0	0	0	0	0	0
2015	ARI	7	0	5	4	1	0.0	0	0	0	0	0	0	0	**1**	0	0
		80	48	284	212	72	1.5	10	4	29	0	29	17	2	3	-3	0

=== Playoffs ===
Year	Team	Games		Tackles					Interceptions					Fumbles			
Year	Team	GP	GS	Cmb	Solo	Ast	Sck	TFL	Int	Yds	TD	Lng	PD	FF	FR	Yds	TD
2015	ARI	**2**	0	**2**	**2**	0	0.0	0	0	0	0	0	0	0	0	0	0
		2	0	2	2	0	0.0	0	0	0	0	0	0	0	0	0	0

== Personal life ==
Clemons was found guilty and sentenced to 10 days in jail for assaulting a woman outside an Arizona night club in May 2016.
