= Jimmy Wilson (American football) =

American football player (born 1986)

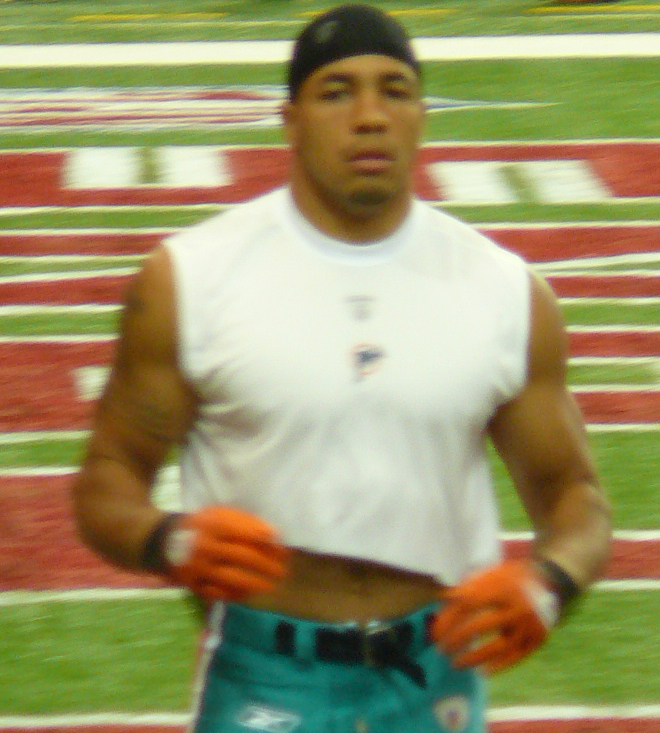
- Wilson with the Miami Dolphins in 2011

No. 25, 27
- Position: Safety

Personal information
- Born: July 30, 1986 (age 40); San Diego, California, U.S.
- Listed height: 5 ft 11 in (1.80 m)
- Listed weight: 205 lb (93 kg)

Career information
- High school: Point Loma (San Diego)
- College: Montana
- NFL draft: 2011: 7th round, 235th overall pick

Career history
- Miami Dolphins (2011–2014); San Diego Chargers (2015); Kansas City Chiefs (2016)*; Cincinnati Bengals (2016)*
- * Offseason or practice squad member only

Career NFL statistics
- Total tackles: 199
- Sacks: 3.0
- Forced fumbles: 3
- Fumble recoveries: 1
- Interceptions: 5
- Stats at Pro Football Reference

James Leon Wilson (born July 30, 1986) is an American former professional football player who was a safety in the National Football League (NFL). He was selected by the Miami Dolphins in the seventh round of the 2011 NFL draft. He played college football for the Montana Grizzlies.

== Professional career ==
Pre-draft measurables
Height	Weight	40-yard dash	10-yard split	20-yard split	20-yard shuttle	Three-cone drill	Vertical jump	Broad jump	Bench press
5 ft 11 in (1.80 m)	193 lb (88 kg)	4.51 s	1.62 s	2.64 s	4.26 s	6.93 s	35.0 in (0.89 m)	9 ft 11 in (3.02 m)	18 reps
All values from Pro Day

=== Miami Dolphins ===
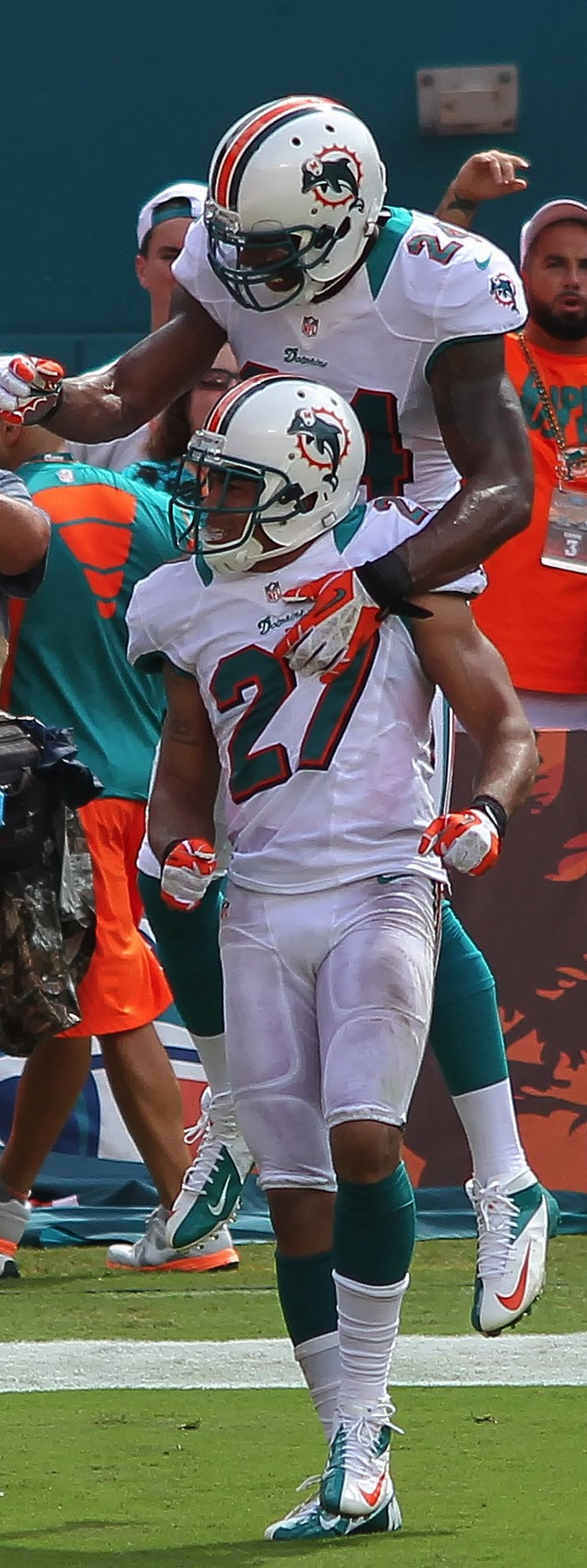
Wilson celebrating with teammate, Sean Smith, in 2012.

Wilson was selected in the seventh round (235th overall) in the 2011 NFL draft by the Miami Dolphins. On September 25, 2011, Wilson recorded his first-career interception from Colt McCoy and the Cleveland Browns. On October 17, 2011, Wilson recorded his first-career forced fumble against Joe McKnight and the New York Jets. Wilson ended the 2011 season with 8 sacks, 5 passes defended, an interception, and a forced fumble.

On October 14, 2012, Wilson recorded his second-career forced fumble against Brit Miller and the St. Louis Rams. On October 28, 2012, Wilson recorded his first-career sack against Mark Sanchez and the New York Jets. Wilson also blocked a punt for a touchdown against Robert Malone in the same game. On November 11, 2012, Wilson recorded his second-career sack on Jake Locker against the Tennessee Titans. Wilson ended the 2012 season with 35 tackles, 4 passes defended, a forced fumble and a career-high 2 sacks.

On September 22, 2013, Wilson grabbed his 2nd interception off Matt Ryan and the Atlanta Falcons. On September 30, 2013, Wilson recorded his 3rd forced fumble off Darren Sproles and the New Orleans Saints. On November 11, 2013, Wilson took his 3rd interception off Mike Glennon and the Tampa Bay Buccaneers. Wilson ended the 2013 season with 37 tackles, 5 passes defended, a forced fumble and a career-high 2 interceptions.

On September 28, 2014, Wilson recorded his 4th interception off Matt McGloin and the Oakland Raiders. Wilson ended the 2014 season with a career-high 57 tackles, 2 passes defended, and an interception.

=== San Diego Chargers ===
On March 13, 2015, Wilson signed a two-year, $4.85 million contract with the San Diego Chargers. On September 20, 2015, Wilson recorded his first-career fumble recovery off Jeremy Hill and the Cincinnati Bengals. On October 12, 2015, Wilson caught his 5th interception from Michael Vick and the Pittsburgh Steelers. On November 29, 2015, Wilson recorded his 3rd-career sack off Blake Bortles and the Jacksonville Jaguars. On December 15, 2015, Wilson was released by the Chargers.

=== Kansas City Chiefs ===
On April 1, 2016, Wilson signed a one-year contract with the Kansas City Chiefs. The Chiefs released Wilson on May 3, 2016.

=== Cincinnati Bengals ===
On July 28, 2016, Wilson signed with the Cincinnati Bengals. On September 2, 2016, Wilson was released by the Bengals.

== NFL career statistics ==
Legend
**Bold**	Career high

Year	Team	Games		Tackles					Interceptions					Fumbles			
Year	Team	GP	GS	Cmb	Solo	Ast	Sck	TFL	Int	Yds	TD	Lng	PD	FF	FR	Yds	TD
2011	MIA	15	1	17	14	3	0.0	0	1	5	0	5	**5**	**1**	0	0	0
2012	MIA	15	4	41	36	5	**2.0**	**3**	0	0	0	0	4	**1**	0	0	0
2013	MIA	**16**	3	39	38	1	0.0	0	**2**	21	0	23	**5**	**1**	0	0	0
2014	MIA	14	**13**	**58**	**47**	11	0.0	0	1	**31**	0	**31**	2	0	0	0	0
2015	SDG	13	6	44	31	**13**	1.0	1	1	0	0	0	2	0	**1**	0	0
		73	27	199	166	33	3.0	4	5	57	0	31	18	3	1	0	0

== Personal life ==
On June 2, 2007, Wilson was accused of shooting and killing the boyfriend of his aunt, 29-year-old Kevin Smoot of Lancaster, California. Wilson was subsequently arrested on June 12, 2007, on murder charges by the State of California. Two murder trials were held, in the first trial the jury was unable to reach a verdict after a week of deliberation, and the second trial ended on July 9, 2009, in an acquittal by the jury as his attorney argued Wilson acted in self-defense during the altercation.
