= Frank Kearse =

American football player (born 1988)

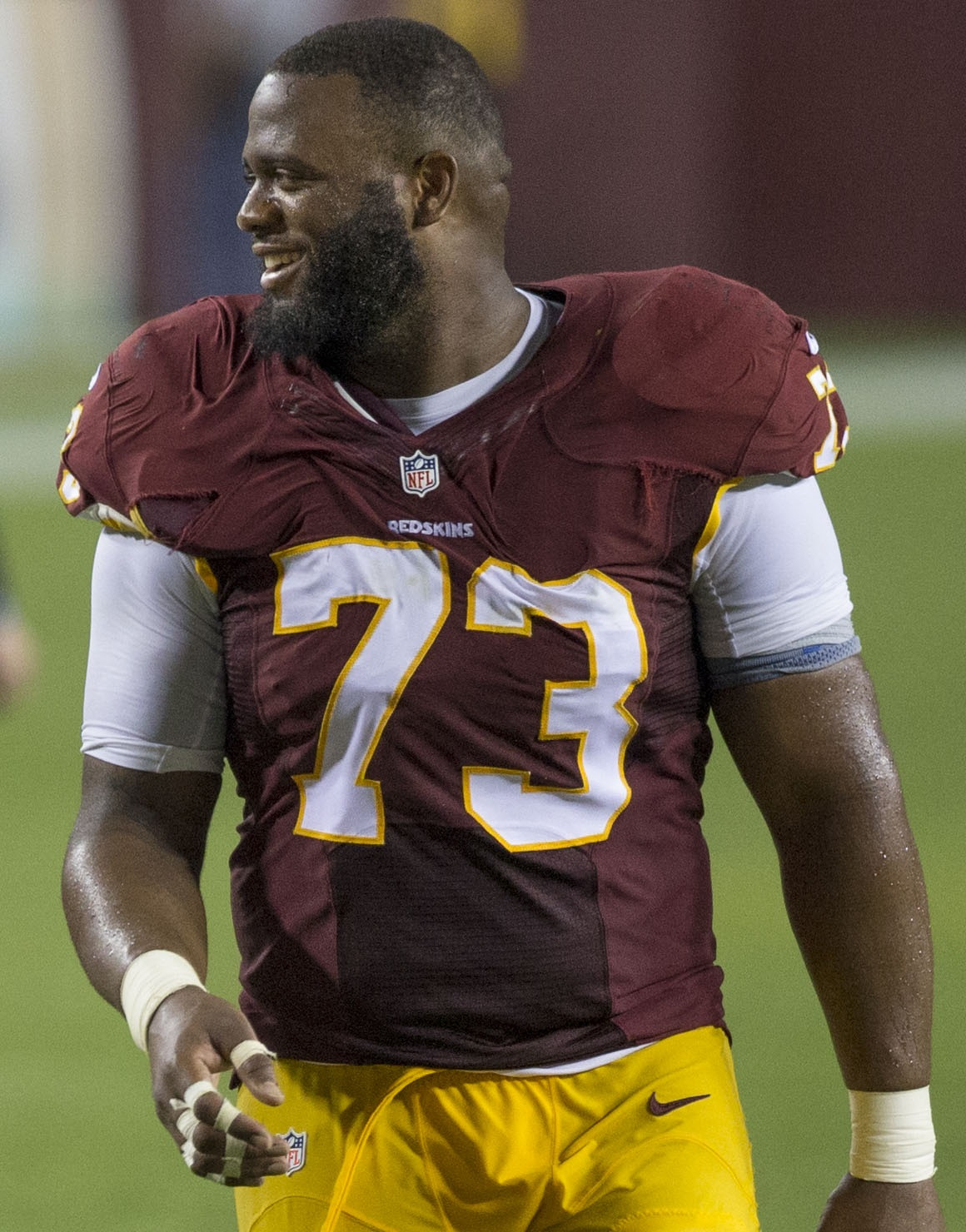
- Kearse with the Washington Redskins in 2015

No. 70, 73, 99
- Position: Defensive end

Personal information
- Born: October 28, 1988 (age 38); Savannah, Georgia, U.S.
- Listed height: 6 ft 4 in (1.93 m)
- Listed weight: 315 lb (143 kg)

Career information
- High school: Savannah
- College: Alabama A&M
- NFL draft: 2011: 7th round, 231st overall pick

Career history
- Miami Dolphins (2011)*; Carolina Panthers (2011–2012); Tennessee Titans (2013)*; Dallas Cowboys (2013); Washington Redskins (2014–2015); New England Patriots (2016)*
- * Offseason or practice squad member only

Career NFL statistics
- Total tackles: 43
- Sacks: 5.5
- Stats at Pro Football Reference

Frank Kearse (born October 28, 1988) is an American former professional football player who was a defensive end in the National Football League (NFL). He was selected by the Miami Dolphins in the seventh round of the 2011 NFL draft. He played college football for the Alabama A&M Bulldogs.

He was also a member of the Carolina Panthers, Tennessee Titans, Dallas Cowboys, Washington Redskins, and New England Patriots.

== Professional career ==
Pre-draft measurables
Height	Weight	40-yard dash	10-yard split	20-yard split	20-yard shuttle	Three-cone drill	Vertical jump	Broad jump	Bench press
6 ft 4 in (1.93 m)	315 lb (143 kg)	5.30 s	1.83 s	3.05 s	4.66 s	7.80 s	30.0 in (0.76 m)	8 ft 7 in (2.62 m)	22 reps
All values from Pro Day

=== Miami Dolphins ===
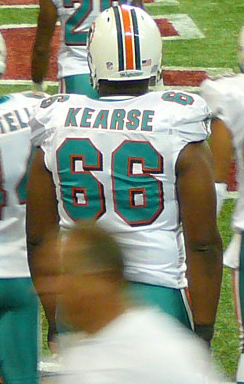
Kearse with the Dolphins in the 2011

The Miami Dolphins selected Kearse in the seventh round with the 231st overall pick of the 2011 NFL draft.

=== Carolina Panthers ===
Played in six games with four starts at nose tackle for Carolina Panthers. Inactive during the beginning of the 2011 season. He was released on August 28, 2013.

=== Tennessee Titans ===
The Tennessee Titans signed Kearse to its practice squad on November 26, 2013.

=== Dallas Cowboys ===
Kearse was signed onto the Dallas Cowboys' roster from the Titans' practice squad on December 18, 2013. The Cowboys released him on May 12, 2014.

=== Washington Redskins ===
On May 17, 2014, Kearse signed with the Washington Redskins. In a Week 2 win against the Jacksonville Jaguars, Kearse recorded one of ten sacks the Redskins had on quarterback Chad Henne. In a Monday Night Football game against the Seattle Seahawks in Week 5, Kearse recorded a career-high five combined tackles, including a sack on quarterback Russell Wilson. In a Week 7 win against the Tennessee Titans, Kearse would record the team's only sack. He would finish the season with 15 total tackles, and 3 sacks.

Kearse was released on September 12, 2015 in order to promote linebacker Houston Bates from the team's practice squad, re-signed with the team on September 14. He was released again on September 19 in order to promote linebacker Terrance Plummer from the practice squad, but again re-signed on September 21. He was released for a third time on October 3, but re-signed again two days later.

=== New England Patriots ===
On March 11, 2016, Kearse signed with the New England Patriots.

On August 23, 2016, Kearse was released by the Patriots. On August 27, 2016, Kearse cleared waivers and was placed on injured reserve. On September 1, 2016, Kearse was released from the Patriots' injured reserve list with an injury settlement.
