= Ryan Spadola =

American football player (born 1991)

No. 85
- Position: Wide receiver

Personal information
- Born: February 15, 1991 (age 35); Howell Township, New Jersey, U.S.
- Listed height: 6 ft 1 in (1.85 m)
- Listed weight: 204 lb (93 kg)

Career information
- High school: Freehold Township (NJ)
- College: Lehigh
- NFL draft: 2013: undrafted

Career history
- New York Jets (2013); Miami Dolphins (2013); Atlanta Falcons (2014)*; Arizona Cardinals (2014−2015)*; Detroit Lions (2015–2016)
- * Offseason or practice squad member only
- Stats at Pro Football Reference

Ryan Spadola (born February 15, 1991) is an American former football wide receiver. He was signed by the New York Jets as an undrafted free agent in 2013. He played college football at Lehigh.

== Early life ==
Spadola was a member of the Super 100 Athletes in New Jersey. Spadola grew up in Howell Township, New Jersey and attended Freehold Township High School, graduating from the school in 2009. He was among the players in the Top 170 in the country and was a member of the All-Shore Team while at high school.

== College career ==
Spadola played college football at Lehigh. He caught his first collegiate reception for 16 yards against Holy Cross.

== Professional career ==
Pre-draft measurables
Height	Weight	Arm length	Hand span	40-yard dash	20-yard shuttle	Three-cone drill	Vertical jump	Broad jump	Bench press
6 ft 1 in (1.85 m)	204 lb (93 kg)	30 3/4 in (0.78 m)	9 3/4 in (0.25 m)	4.48 s	4.07 s	6.72 s	33.5 in (0.85 m)	11 ft 9 in (3.58 m)	15 reps
All values from the NFL Combine

=== New York Jets ===
Spadola was signed by the New York Jets on April 27, 2013 following the conclusion of the 2013 NFL draft. In a preseason game on August 24, 2013, Spadola had three catches for 110 yards and one touchdown. He also had a seventy-yard reception which led to the Jets' game-winning field goal. Spadola was released on October 5, 2013.

=== Miami Dolphins ===
The Jets wanted to re-sign Spadola however, he opted to sign to the Miami Dolphins' practice squad on October 8, 2013. He was promoted to the active roster on October 31, 2013. The Dolphins released Spadola on August 26, 2014.

=== Atlanta Falcons ===
He was signed to the Atlanta Falcons' practice squad on October 9, 2014. On November 25, 2014, Spadola was waived and replaced on the practice squad by Freddie Martino.

=== Arizona Cardinals ===
On December 2, 2014, he was signed by the Arizona Cardinals to their practice squad. On August 31, 2015, he was waived by the Cardinals.

=== Detroit Lions ===
On October 20, 2015, he was signed by the Detroit Lions to their practice squad. On January 4, 2016, Spadola signed a futures contract with the Detroit Lions.

On August 8, 2017, Spadola was waived/injured by the Lions and placed on injured reserve. He was released on August 15, 2017.
