= Nate Garner =

American football player (born 1985)

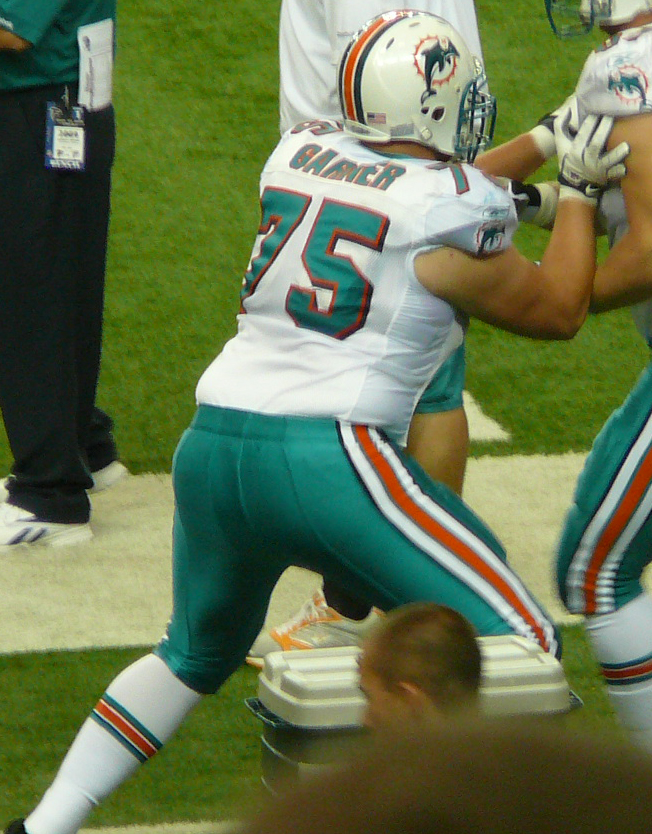
- Garner with the Miami Dolphins in 2009

North Greenville Trailblazers
- Title: Head coach

Personal information
- Born: January 18, 1985 (age 41); El Sobrante, California, U.S.
- Listed height: 6 ft 7 in (2.01 m)
- Listed weight: 320 lb (145 kg)

Career information
- High school: Joe T. Robinson (Little Rock, Arkansas)
- College: Arkansas
- NFL draft: 2008: 7th round, 211th overall pick

Career history

Playing
- New York Jets (2008)*; Miami Dolphins (2008–2014)
- * Offseason or practice squad member only

Coaching
- New Orleans Saints (2018) Volunteer assistant; Arkansas (2018) Assistant coach; ASA Miami (2019) Offensive line coach; St. Thomas Aquinas HS (FL) (2020–2021) Offensive line coach; Limestone (2022–2024) Offensive line coach; North Greenville (2025–present) Head coach

Awards and highlights
- Second-team All-SEC (2007)

Career NFL statistics
- Games played: 74
- Games started: 19
- Stats at Pro Football Reference

Head coaching record
- Regular season: 7–4 (.636)
- Postseason: 0–1 (.000)
- Career: 7–5 (.583)

Nathaniel W. Garner (born January 18, 1985) is an American college football coach and former professional football offensive tackle. He is the head football coach for North Greenville University, a position he has held since 2025. He began his career with the University of Arkansas before being selected by the New York Jets as the seventh round pick of the 2008 NFL draft. Garner was eventually traded to the Miami Dolphins, where he spent the remainder of his professional playing career.

== Early life and college ==
Garner attended Pulaski Robinson High School (later renamed Joe T. Robinson High School) just outside the city limits of Little Rock, Arkansas. Throughout his early high school career, he got selected for the PrepStar All-Region IV Team. He was ranked as the Number 138 offensive lineman prospect in the nation by Insiders.com. Following graduation from high school, he enrolled into the J. William Fulbright College of Arts and Sciences, and later got accepted into the University of Arkansas where he played offensive line for the Razorbacks football team. His most common position throughout the entirety of his high school, college, and professional playing career was offensive tackle.

In 2007, Garner had graduated from both the J. William Fulbright College of Arts and Sciences majoring in Sociology, and the University of Arkansas with a Bachelor's degree also in Sociology.

== Professional career ==
Soon following graduation, Garner was selected 211th overall by the New York Jets in the seventh round of the 2008 NFL draft.

Toward the middle of his professional career, he was traded to the Miami Dolphins and played for them until 2018.

Soon after leaving the Dolphins, he became an NFL volunteer assistant coach and scout for the New Orleans Saints later that year.

== Coaching career ==
Following his seventh and final year of playing in the NFL, in 2018 Garner later became an NFL volunteer assistant coach and scout for the New Orleans Saints. Afterwards, he became an offensive line assistant at his alma mater. He later returned to Florida as an offensive line consultant with Royal Palm Beach High School. He is now an offensive line coach for both the St. Thomas Aquinas High School in Fort Lauderdale, and ASA College's Miami campus where he also ended up working as a run game coordinator during the remainder of the 2019–2020 season. Garner also helped lead the St. Thomas Aquinas High School football program to a state championship near the same time.

== Personal life ==
Garner has become a licensed amateur radio operator with the callsign NG2A. He obtained his first license in 2021.

== Head coaching record ==
Year	Team	Overall	Conference	Standing	Bowl/playoffs
North Greenville Trailblazers (Conference Carolinas) (2025–present)
2025	North Greenville	7–5	6–0	1st	L NCAA Division II First Round
North Greenville:		7–5	6–0		
Total:		7–5			
