= Isaako Aaitui =

American football player (born 1987)

No. 97
- Position: Nose tackle

Personal information
- Born: January 25, 1987 (age 39); Pago Pago, American Samoa
- Listed height: 6 ft 3 in (1.91 m)
- Listed weight: 307 lb (139 kg)

Career information
- High school: Faga'itua (Pago Pago, American Samoa)
- College: UNLV (2006–2010)
- NFL draft: 2011: undrafted

Career history
- Miami Dolphins (2011–2012)*; New York Jets (2012)*; New Orleans Saints (2013)*; Miami Dolphins (2013); Washington Redskins (2014–2015)*; Tennessee Titans (2015)*
- * Offseason or practice squad member only

Awards and highlights
- Third-team All-Mountain West (2010)

Career NFL statistics
- Total tackles: 3
- Stats at Pro Football Reference

Isaako Aaitui (born January 25, 1987) is a former American football nose tackle. He was originally signed by the Miami Dolphins as an undrafted free agent in 2011. He played college football at UNLV.

== Early life ==
Aaitui attended Faga'itua High School in Pago Pago, where he played rugby, volleyball and soccer in addition to football prior to graduating in 2006. Aaitui's high school football coach originally intended him to kick and punt because of his rugby background, but decided to try him at defensive end due to his size, and kept him there after he recorded five sacks in his first game.

== College career ==
Aaitui was recruited by UNLV despite speaking little English and having much less football experience than his teammates, and not having heard of the city of Las Vegas before arriving for his recruiting trip. After redshirting at UNLV in 2006, Aaitui made his Rebels debut in 2007, appearing in seven games and recording 10 tackles (two for a loss). He started nine of 12 games played as a sophomore in 2008, totaling 32 tackles (14 solo), leading the team with seven tackles for a loss and tying for the team lead with two sacks.

Aaitui started 10 of 12 games at defensive tackle as a junior in 2009, recording 31 tackles and 2.5 tackles for a loss. He closed out his collegiate career with 27 tackles (5 for a loss), 1.5 sacks, a forced fumble, a fumble recovery and a blocked kick, earning third-team All-Mountain West Conference honors.

== Professional career ==
=== Miami Dolphins ===
After going undrafted in the 2011 NFL draft, Aaitui did not attend training camp and did not sign with a team until joining the practice squad of the Miami Dolphins on October 5, 2011. He remained on the practice squad the rest of his rookie season and was re-signed to a future contract in January 2012.

Aaitui's attempt to make the Dolphins' roster in 2012 was documented on the HBO series Hard Knocks: Training Camp with the Miami Dolphins. He came up just short of earning a roster spot and was waived by the team during final cuts, with the organization hoping to retain him on the practice squad.

=== New York Jets ===
After being waived by the Dolphins, Aaitui made his first NFL roster when he was claimed by the New York Jets on September 2. However, he suffered a torn ACL and MCL in his first practice with the Jets and was subsequently waived two days later.

=== New Orleans Saints ===
After spending the 2012 season out of football with a knee injury, Aaitui signed a two-year contract with the New Orleans Saints in May 2013. However, he was once again waived during final cuts on August 31.

=== Miami Dolphins (second stint) ===
Aaitui was re-signed by the Dolphins on September 17, 2013, to provide depth at the defensive tackle position due to an injury to Paul Soliai. He was promoted to the active roster on October 19 after the release of Marvin Austin. Aaitui made his NFL debut the following day, participating in 19 defensive snaps in the team's home loss to the Buffalo Bills.

=== Washington Redskins ===
Aaitui signed with the Washington Redskins practice squad on December 16, 2014. He signed a future deal on December 29.

On May 4, 2015, he was waived by the Redskins.
