= Will Yeatman =

American football player (born 1988)

No. 72, 89
- Position: Offensive tackle

Personal information
- Born: April 10, 1988 (age 38); Naples, Italy
- Listed height: 6 ft 6 in (1.98 m)
- Listed weight: 315 lb (143 kg)

Career information
- High school: Rancho Bernardo (San Diego, California)
- College: Notre Dame (2006–2008); Maryland (2010)
- NFL draft: 2011: undrafted

Career history
- New England Patriots (2011)*; Miami Dolphins (2011–2013); Houston Texans (2014); Houston Texans (2015)*
- * Offseason or practice squad member only

Career NFL statistics
- Games played: 15
- Stats at Pro Football Reference

William Yeatman (born April 10, 1988) is an American former professional football player who was an offensive tackle for five seasons in the National Football League (NFL). He played college football and college lacrosse for the Notre Dame Fighting Irish and the Maryland Terrapins. Yeatman was signed by the New England Patriots as an undrafted free agent on July 27, 2011. Yeatman ended his career in 2015 after reaching an injury settlement with the Houston Texans. He credited five seasons in the NFL.

== Early life ==
Yeatman was born in Naples, Italy, to parents Dennis and Bonnie Yeatman. His father played lacrosse for the United States Naval Academy and retired as a Commander after twenty years of naval service. His mother, Bonnie, is a former teacher and graduate of The University of Maryland. Yeatman has four siblings: Grant, who was a member of Navy ROTC and played Club lacrosse at University of Southern California, he now works for Jones Lang & LaSalle in Oakland; Caroline, a former member of San Diego State's Crew team and Club lacrosse team. She is a graduate of San Diego State and taught English and coached lacrosse in Kiel, Germany for three years. She now lives in San Diego; Anne Morgan, who played lacrosse and graduated from Maryland; she won a national championship. Jack, a senior, played lacrosse at Providence College.

Yeatman was raised in San Diego, California, and attended Rancho Bernardo High School, where he played football (as a tight end) and lacrosse. Yeatman earned all-league his sophomore year as the teams left tackle. As a junior, he switched to tight end and recorded 26 receptions for 340 yards and four touchdowns. As a senior, he recorded 36 receptions for 527 yards and seven touchdowns. He was a three-time all-conference and all-city selection in football, and an all-state selection in his senior year. Yeatman was recruited by over 70 schools in football and received scholarship offers from 43 schools in football most notably Michigan, Nebraska, Maryland, California, Washington, Arizona, Arizona State, UCLA, USC, Boston College, Florida, North Carolina, Dartmouth and Columbia. His senior year, he was a finalist in the San Diego Prep Pigskin report player of the year voting. In lacrosse he was team captain in his senior year, a four-time all-conference and all-city selection and San Diego county player of the year. He was named to the US Lacrosse All-American team as a junior and senior and to the Under Armour All-American team as a senior. He was an attendee at Jake Reed's Elite 102 Blue Chip lacrosse camp and was recruited by Maryland, Johns Hopkins, Yale, Navy, Georgetown, North Carolina, Duke, Cornell and Brown before signing a letter of intent to go to Notre Dame in December 2005. Yeatman is Rancho Bernardo's leading career and season points leader. His high school career ended as the 2005–2006 Rancho Bernardo High School Male Athlete of the Year.

== College career ==
Following high school, Yeatman attended the University of Notre Dame, where he played both lacrosse (named All American) and football. Yeatman played in every game of his career at Notre Dame in football used predominantly as a blocking tight end. The Fighting Irish fell to LSU in the Sugar Bowl that year. His Freshman year, Yeatman was the leading scorer on the Notre Dame lacrosse team with 46 points on 21 goals and 25 assists. He was the LaxPower Rookie of the Year as well as Great Western Lacrosse League Rookie of the Year and 1st Team member. As a freshman, he recorded no receptions. As a sophomore, he recorded six receptions for 37 yards. and as a junior he recorded three receptions for thirty yards through three games.

In January 2009, Yeatman transferred from Notre Dame to the University of Maryland. He played lacrosse at Maryland for his final two seasons in college, and also played football in his senior season. In football, he played on special teams (making three tackles) and at tight end. Yeatman played in the last eleven games of the season, having fractured a finger during the pre-season. He recorded 13 receptions for 134 yards. In lacrosse, Yeatman was fourth on the team in scoring both his Junior and Senior seasons, as the Terrapins reached the NCAA lacrosse quarterfinal both years. Yeatman graduated with a Bachelor of Arts in History from Maryland.

=== College lacrosse statistics ===
Season	Team	GP	G	A	Pts
2010	Maryland	16	15	7	22
2009	Maryland	17	13	15	28
2007	Notre Dame	15	21	25	46
Totals		48	49	47	96

== Professional career ==
=== New England Patriots ===
Yeatman was signed by the New England Patriots as a rookie free agent on July 27, 2011. In a Patriots conference call on August 23, 2011, Yeatman said he did not plan to play much lacrosse in the future.

In four games of the 2011 pre-season, Yeatman recorded six receptions for 36 yards. He was waived on September 3 and asked to be on the Patriots practice squad

=== Miami Dolphins ===
On September 4, 2011, Yeatman was claimed off waivers by the Miami Dolphins. Yeatman was utilized as a blocking tight end and reserve tight end his rookie season.

In 2012, Yeatman was switched from a tight end to an offensive tackle, where he was utilized as a reserve lineman all season and his uniform number was switched from 89 to 60 and then 72 after final cuts. Yeatman gained 35 pounds in the position switch. He was then shifted over to guard before the 2013 season.

In 2013 Yeatman played in every game on special teams, as a reserve offensive lineman and tight end before he was placed on injured reserve after tearing his ACL on November 13.

=== Houston Texans ===
Yeatman signed with the Houston Texans on June 17, 2014.

He signed an injury settlement and was waived on July 31, 2015.
