= Julius Pruitt =

American football player (born 1985)

No. 11
- Position: Wide receiver

Personal information
- Born: December 30, 1985 (age 40); Newport, Arkansas, U.S.
- Listed height: 6 ft 2 in (1.88 m)
- Listed weight: 206 lb (93 kg)

Career information
- College: Ouachita Baptist
- NFL draft: 2009: undrafted

Career history
- Miami Dolphins (2010−2011; 2013)*; Arizona Rattlers (2014)*
- * Offseason or practice squad member only

Career NFL statistics
- Total tackles: 4
- Stats at Pro Football Reference

Julius Pruitt (born December 30, 1985) is an American former professional football player who was a wide receiver in the National Football League (NFL). He was signed by the Miami Dolphins as an undrafted free agent in 2009. He played college football for the Ouachita Baptist Tigers.

== Professional career ==
=== Miami Dolphins ===
Pruitt was signed by the Miami Dolphins as an undrafted rookie free agent. He was waived by Miami Dolphins on September 3, 2011. In the 2011 NFL season he made a strong impact as a gunner, improving the special teams greatly late in the season.

On July 31, 2013, Pruitt was signed again by the Miami Dolphins. He was cut by the Dolphins on August 27, 2013.

=== Arizona Rattlers ===
Pruitt was assigned to the Arizona Rattlers of the Arena Football League on October 21, 2013.
