= 2014 Miami Dolphins season =

49th season in franchise history

- Owner: Stephen Ross
- General manager: Dennis Hickey
- Head coach: Joe Philbin
- Home stadium: Sun Life Stadium

Results
- Record: 8–8
- Division place: 3rd AFC East
- Playoffs: Did not qualify
- Pro Bowlers: Brent Grimes, CB; Mike Pouncey, OG; Cameron Wake, DE

Uniform
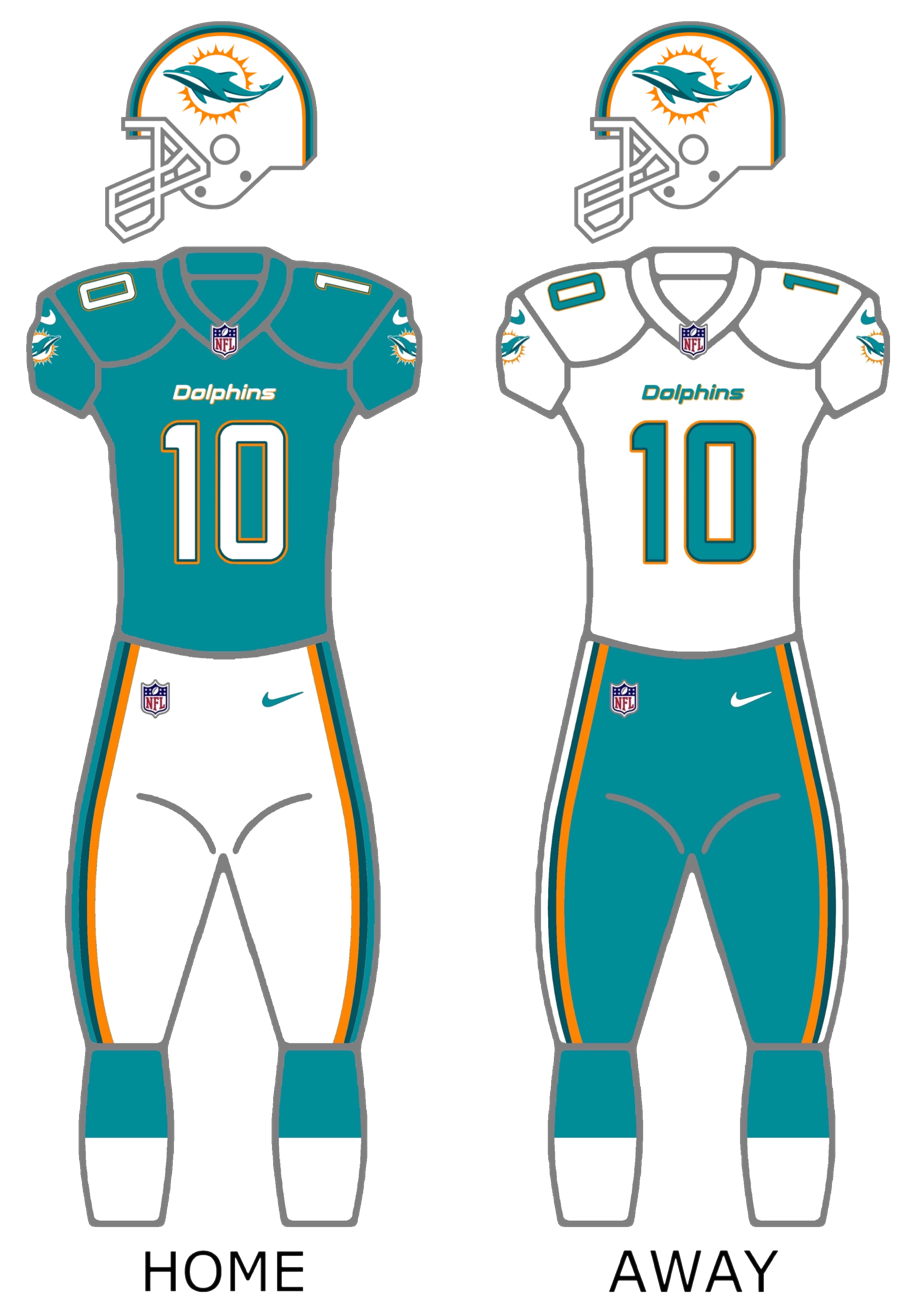

The 2014 season was the Miami Dolphins' 45th in the National Football League (NFL), their 49th overall and their third under head coach Joe Philbin. Following the appointment of Dennis Hickey, the team had a new general manager for the first time since 2007 after Jeff Ireland was fired on January 7, 2014. The Dolphins equaled their 8–8 record from 2013 and missed the playoffs for a sixth consecutive season.

== 2014 draft ==
2014 Miami Dolphins Draft
Round	Selection	Player	Position	College
1	19	Ja'Wuan James	Offensive tackle	Tennessee
2	63	Jarvis Landry	Wide receiver	LSU
3	67	Billy Turner	Offensive tackle	North Dakota State
4	125	Walt Aikens	Cornerback	Liberty
5	155	Arthur Lynch	Tight end	Georgia
5	171	Jordan Tripp	Linebacker	Montana
6	190	Matt Hazel	Wide receiver	Coastal Carolina
7	234	Terrence Fede	Defensive end	Marist

Notable undrafted free agent

2014 Miami Dolphins Draft
Round	Selection	Player	Position	College
—	—	Damien Williams	Running back	Oklahoma

Draft trades

- The Dolphins traded their original second-round selection (No. 50 overall) to the San Diego Chargers in exchange for the Chargers' second- and fourth-round selections — Nos. 57 and 125 overall. The Dolphins later traded the No. 57 selection to the San Francisco 49ers in exchange for the 49ers' second- (No. 63 overall) and fifth- (No. 171 overall) round selections.
- The Dolphins traded their original third- (No. 81 overall) and fourth- (No. 116 overall) round selections to the Oakland Raiders in exchange for the Raiders' third-round selection (No. 67 overall).

== Staff ==
2014 Miami Dolphins staff
Front office: Chairman/managing general partner – Stephen Ross; Vice chairman/partner – Jorge Perez; Vice chairman – Don Shula; President/CEO – Tom Garfinkel; General manager – Dennis Hickey; Assistant general manager – Eric Stokes; Executive vice president of football administration – Dawn Aponte; Manager of football administration – Ryan Herman; Director of college scouting – Chris Grier; Assistant director of college scouting – Joe Schoen; Director of pro scouting – Anthony Hunt; Assistant director of pro scouting – Chris Shea; Head coaches: Head coach – Joe Philbin; Offensive coaches: Offensive coordinator – Bill Lazor; Quarterbacks – Zac Taylor; Assistant quarterbacks – Ben Johnson; Running backs – Jeff Nixon; Wide receivers – Ken O'Keefe; Assistant wide receivers – Phil McGeoghan; Tight ends – Dan Campbell; Offensive line – John Benton; Assistant offensive line – Jack Bicknell Jr.; Offensive assistant – Ben Martin	Defensive coaches: Defensive coordinator – Kevin Coyle; Defensive line – Kacy Rodgers; Assistant defensive line – Charlie Bullen; Linebackers – Mark Duffner; Defensive quality control/assistant linebackers – David Corrao; Defensive backs – Lou Anarumo; Assistant defensive backs – Blue Adams; Special teams coaches: Special teams coordinator – Darren Rizzi; Assistant special teams coordinator – Marwan Maalouf; Strength and conditioning: Head strength and conditioning – Darren Krein; Assistant strength and conditioning – David Puloka

== Final roster ==
2014 Miami Dolphins roster
Quarterbacks (QB): 8 Matt Moore; 17 Ryan Tannehill; Running backs (RB): 33 LaMichael James; 26 Lamar Miller; 30 Daniel Thomas; 34 Damien Williams; Wide receivers (WR): 10 Brandon Gibson; 82 Brian Hartline; 83 Matt Hazel; 14 Jarvis Landry RS; 18 Rishard Matthews; 11 Mike Wallace; Tight ends (TE): 42 Charles Clay; 85 Gerell Robinson; 80 Dion Sims	Offensive linemen (OL): 65 Sam Brenner C; 67 Daryn Colledge G; 74 Jason Fox T; 70 Ja'Wuan James T; 51 Mike Pouncey G; 64 Samson Satele C; 66 Shelley Smith G; 63 Dallas Thomas G/T; 77 Billy Turner G; Defensive linemen (DL): 62 Deandre Coleman DT; 78 Terrence Fede DE; 95 Dion Jordan DE; 90 Earl Mitchell DT; 98 Jared Odrick DT; 79 Derrick Shelby DE; 94 Randy Starks DT; 50 Olivier Vernon DE; 91 Cameron Wake DE	Linebackers (LB): 56 Jonathan Freeny OLB; 53 Jelani Jenkins OLB; 58 Chris McCain OLB; 55 Koa Misi MLB; 97 Kelvin Sheppard MLB; 57 Jordan Tripp OLB; 93 Jason Trusnik OLB; 52 Philip Wheeler OLB; Defensive backs (DB): 35 Walt Aikens FS; 24 Cortland Finnegan CB; 21 Brent Grimes CB; 36 T. J. Heath CB; 38 Don Jones FS; 20 Reshad Jones SS; 44 Jordan Kovacs SS; 41 R. J. Stanford CB; 27 Jimmy Wilson CB/S; Special teams (ST): 92 John Denney LS; 2 Brandon Fields P; 9 Caleb Sturgis K	Practice squad: 61 Mark Asper G; 6 McLeod Bethel-Thompson QB; 81 LaRon Byrd WR (IR); 66 Emmanuel Dieke DE; 45 Jake Knott LB; 40 Lowell Rose CB; 86 Jake Stoneburner TE; 87 L'Damian Washington WR; Reserve: 71 Branden Albert T (IR); 29 Will Davis CB (IR); 25 Louis Delmas FS (IR); 59 Dannell Ellerbe LB (IR); 96 A. J. Francis DT (IR); 75 Nate Garner G (NF-Inj.); 23 Mike Gillislee RB (IR); 76 Anthony Johnson DT (IR); 73 Kamal Johnson DT (IR); 88 Arthur Lynch TE (IR); 28 Knowshon Moreno RB (IR); 37 Sammy Seamster CB (IR); 22 Jamar Taylor CB (IR); 31 Michael Thomas FS (IR); Rookies in italics 53 active, 15 reserve, 7 practice squad

== Schedule ==
=== Preseason ===
Week	Date	Opponent	Result	Record	Venue	Recap
1	August 8	at Atlanta Falcons	**L** 10–16	0–1	Georgia Dome	Recap
2	August 16	at Tampa Bay Buccaneers	**W** 20–14	1–1	Raymond James Stadium	Recap
3	August 23	Dallas Cowboys	**W** 25–20	2–1	Sun Life Stadium	Recap
4	August 28	St. Louis Rams	**W** 14–13	3–1	Sun Life Stadium	Recap

=== Regular season ===
Week	Date	Opponent	Result	Record	Venue	Recap
1	September 7	**New England Patriots**	**W** 33–20	1–0	Sun Life Stadium	Recap
2	September 14	at **Buffalo Bills**	**L** 10–29	1–1	Ralph Wilson Stadium	Recap
3	September 21	Kansas City Chiefs	**L** 15–34	1–2	Sun Life Stadium	Recap
4	September 28	at Oakland Raiders	**W** 38–14	2–2	(United Kingdom) Wembley Stadium (London)	Recap
5	Bye					
6	October 12	Green Bay Packers	**L** 24–27	2–3	Sun Life Stadium	Recap
7	October 19	at Chicago Bears	**W** 27–14	3–3	Soldier Field	Recap
8	October 26	at Jacksonville Jaguars	**W** 27–13	4–3	EverBank Field	Recap
9	November 2	San Diego Chargers	**W** 37–0	5–3	Sun Life Stadium	Recap
10	November 9	at Detroit Lions	**L** 16–20	5–4	Ford Field	Recap
11	November 13	**Buffalo Bills**	**W** 22–9	6–4	Sun Life Stadium	Recap
12	November 23	at Denver Broncos	**L** 36–39	6–5	Sports Authority Field at Mile High	Recap
13	December 1	at **New York Jets**	**W** 16–13	7–5	MetLife Stadium	Recap
14	December 7	Baltimore Ravens	**L** 13–28	7–6	Sun Life Stadium	Recap
15	December 14	at **New England Patriots**	**L** 13–41	7–7	Gillette Stadium	Recap
16	December 21	Minnesota Vikings	**W** 37–35	8–7	Sun Life Stadium	Recap
17	December 28	**New York Jets**	**L** 24–37	8–8	Sun Life Stadium	Recap

Note: Intra-division opponents are in bold text.

=== Game summaries ===
==== Week 1: vs. New England Patriots ====
Week One: New England Patriots at Miami Dolphins – Game summary

Quarter	1	2	3	4	Total
Patriots	10	10	0	0	**20**
**Dolphins**	7	3	13	10	**33**

at Sun Life Stadium, Miami Gardens, Florida

- Date: September 7
- Game time: 1:00 p.m. EDT
- Game weather: 89 °F (32 °C), partly cloudy
- Game attendance: 70,630
- Referee: Walt Anderson
- TV announcers (CBS): Greg Gumbel, Trent Green and Evan Washburn
- Recap, Gamebook

Game information

**First quarter**

- MIA – Lamar Miller 4-yard pass from Ryan Tannehill (Caleb Sturgis Kick), 11:46. Dolphins 7–0. **Drive: 4 plays, 16 yards, 1:50.**
- NE – Shane Vereen 2-yard run (Stephen Gostkowski Kick), 5:10. Tied 7–7. **Drive: 13 plays, 80 yards, 6:36.**
- NE – Stephen Gostkowski 47-yard field goal, 0:47. Patriots 10–7. **Drive: 7 plays, 6 yards, 2:52.**

**Second quarter**

- NE – Rob Gronkowski 6-yard pass from Tom Brady (Stephen Gostkowski kick), 8:37. Patriots 17–7. **Drive: 11 plays, 94 yards, 4:19.**
- MIA – Caleb Sturgis 38-yard field goal, 1:59. Patriots 17–10. **Drive: 11 plays, 55 yards, 4:25.**
- NE – Stephen Gostkowski 45-yard field goal, 0:06. Patriots 20–10. **Drive: 8 plays, 47 yards, 1:53.**

**Third quarter**

- MIA – Caleb Sturgis 24-yard field goal, 10:46. Patriots 20–13. **Drive: 8 plays, 66 yards, 4:14.**
- MIA – Mike Wallace 14-yard pass from Ryan Tannehill (Caleb Sturgis kick), 6:55. Tied 20–20. **Drive: 4 plays, 34 yards, 2:04.**
- MIA – Caleb Sturgis 22-yard field goal, 2:38. Dolphins 23–20. **Drive: 10 plays, 50 yards, 3:15.**

**Fourth quarter**

- MIA – Knowshon Moreno 4-yard run (Caleb Sturgis kick), 3:29. Dolphins 30–20. **Drive: 12 plays, 85 yards, 6:01.**
- MIA – Caleb Sturgis 27-yard field goal, 2:44. Dolphins 33–20. **Drive: 4 plays, 5 yards, 0:20.**

**Top passers**

- NE – Tom Brady – 29/56, 249 yards, TD
- MIA – Ryan Tannehill: 18/32, 178 yards, 2 TD, INT

**Top rushers**

- NE – Shane Vereen – 7 rushes, 36 yards, TD
- MIA – Knowshon Moreno: 24 CAR, 134 YDS, TD

**Top receivers**

- NE – Julian Edelman: 6 receptions, 95 yards
- MIA – Mike Wallace: 7 receptions, 81 yards, TD

==== Week 2: at Buffalo Bills ====
Week Two: Miami Dolphins at Buffalo Bills – Game summary

Quarter	1	2	3	4	Total
Dolphins	0	0	10	0	**10**
**Bills**	6	3	14	6	**29**

at Ralph Wilson Stadium, Orchard Park, New York

- Date: September 14
- Game time: 1:00 p.m. EDT
- Game weather: 58 °F (14 °C), mostly cloudy
- Game attendance: 69,954
- Referee: Clete Blakeman
- TV announcers (CBS): Tom McCarthy and Adam Archuleta
- Recap, Gamebook

Game information

**First quarter**

- BUF – Dan Carpenter 27-yard field goal, 4:47. Bills 3–0. **Drive: 10 plays, 49 yards, 4:46.**
- BUF – Dan Carpenter 27-yard field goal, 0:22. Bills 6–0. **Drive: 6 plays, 22 yards, 1:50.**

**Second quarter**

- BUF – Dan Carpenter 31-yard field goal, 10:22. Bills 9–0. **Drive: 6 plays, 40 yards, 2:15.**

**Third quarter**

- MIA – Caleb Sturgis 34-yard field goal, 9:35. Bills 9–3. **Drive: 13 plays, 64 yards, 5:25.**
- BUF – C. J. Spiller 102-yard kickoff return (Dan Carpenter kick), 9:23. Bills 16–3.
- MIA – Mike Wallace 7-yard pass from Ryan Tannehill (Caleb Sturgis kick), 3:15. Bills 16–10. **Drive: 11 plays, 64 yards, 6:08.**
- BUF – Sammy Watkins 12-yard pass from EJ Manuel (Dan Carpenter kick), 0:13. Bills 23–10. **Drive: 6 plays, 77 yards, 3:02.**

**Fourth quarter**

- BUF – Dan Carpenter 32-yard field goal, 10:32. Bills 26–10. **Drive: 8 plays, 34 yards, 4:14.**
- BUF – Dan Carpenter 38-yard field goal, 1:54. Bills 29–10. **Drive: 4 plays, 7 yards, 1:38.**

**Top passers**

- MIA – Ryan Tannehill – 31/49, 241 yards, TD, INT
- BUF – EJ Manuel – 16/26, 202 yards, TD

**Top rushers**

- MIA – Lamar Miller – 11 rushes, 46 yards
- BUF – C. J. Spiller – 12 rushes, 69 yards

**Top receivers**

- MIA – Mike Wallace – 5 receptions, 56 yards, TD
- BUF – Sammy Watkins – 8 receptions, 117 yards, TD

==== Week 3: vs. Kansas City Chiefs ====
Week Three: Kansas City Chiefs at Miami Dolphins – Game summary

Quarter	1	2	3	4	Total
**Chiefs**	0	14	7	13	**34**
Dolphins	0	3	12	0	**15**

at Sun Life Stadium, Miami Gardens, Florida

- Date: September 21
- Game time: 4:25 p.m. EDT
- Game weather: 88 °F (31 °C), cloudy
- Game attendance: 70,313
- Referee: Jeff Triplette
- TV announcers (CBS): Kevin Harlan and Rich Gannon
- Recap, Gamebook

Game information

**First quarter**

- No scoring plays.

**Second quarter**

- KC – Knile Davis 21-yard run (Cairo Santos kick), 6:38. Chiefs 7–0. **Drive: 6 plays, 62 yards, 3:14.**
- KC – Travis Kelce 20-yard pass from Alex Smith (Cairo Santos kick), 1:35. Chiefs 14–0. **Drive: 8 plays, 76 yards, 2:42.**
- MIA – Caleb Sturgis 22-yard field goal, 0:00. Chiefs 14–3. **Drive: 8 plays, 74 yards, 1:35.**

**Third quarter**

- MIA – Brian Hartline 1-yard pass from Ryan Tannehill (Caleb Sturgis kick), 12:07. Chiefs 14–10. **Drive: 4 plays, 19 yards, 1:21.**
- KC – Joe McKnight 11-yard pass from Alex Smith (Cairo Santos kick), 6:36. Chiefs 21–10. **Drive: 10 plays, 66 yards, 5:31.**
- MIA – Caleb Sturgis 51-yard field goal, 5:54. Chiefs 21–13. **Drive: 4 plays, 0 yards, 0:42.**
- MIA – Alex Smith sacked in the end zone by Randy Starks and Jelani Jenkins for a safety, 2:38. Chiefs 21–15.

**Fourth quarter**

- KC – Joe McKnight 4-yard pass from Alex Smith (pass failed), 4:35. Chiefs 27–15. **Drive: 9 plays, 44 yards, 4:39.**
- KC – Cyrus Gray 6-yard run (Cairo Santos kick), 0:13. Chiefs 34–15. **Drive: 6 plays, 36 yards, 1:48.**

**Top passers**

- KC – Alex Smith – 19/25, 186 yards, 3 TD
- MIA – Ryan Tannehill – 21/43, 205 yards, TD

**Top rushers**

- KC – Knile Davis – 32 rushes, 132 yards, TD
- MIA – Lamar Miller – 15 rushes, 108 yards

**Top receivers**

- KC – Joe McKnight – 6 receptions, 64 yards, 2 TD
- MIA – Mike Wallace – 5 receptions, 74 yards

==== Week 4: at Oakland Raiders ====
NFL International Series

Week Four: Miami Dolphins at Oakland Raiders – Game summary

Quarter	1	2	3	4	Total
**Dolphins**	3	21	14	0	**38**
Raiders	7	0	0	7	**14**

at Wembley Stadium, London, England

- Date: September 28
- Game time: 6:00 p.m. BST/1:00 p.m. EDT
- Game weather: 74 °F (23 °C), overcast
- Game attendance: 83,436
- Referee: Bill Leavy
- TV announcers (CBS): Ian Eagle, Dan Fouts and Jenny Dell
- Recap, Gamebook

Game information

**First quarter**

- OAK – Brian Leonhardt 3-yard pass from Derek Carr (Sebastian Janikowski kick), 9:38. Raiders 7–0. **Drive: 10 plays, 74 yards, 5:22.**
- MIA – Caleb Sturgis 41-yard field goal, 6:25. Raiders 7–3. **Drive: 8 plays, 47 yards, 3:13.**

**Second quarter**

- MIA – Mike Wallace 13-yard pass from Ryan Tannehill (Caleb Sturgis kick), 14:17. Dolphins 10–7. **Drive: 8 plays, 91 yards, 3:46.**
- MIA – Lamar Miller 9-yard run (Caleb Sturgis kick), 9:15. Dolphins 17–7. **Drive: 7 plays, 63 yards, 3:35.**
- MIA – Dion Sims 18-yard pass from Ryan Tannehill (Caleb Sturgis kick), 1:53. Dolphins 24–7. **Drive: 9 plays, 90 yards, 4:03.**

**Third quarter**

- MIA – Lamar Miller 1-yard run (Caleb Sturgis kick), 8:13. Dolphins 31–7. **Drive: 2 plays, 3 yards, 0:28.**
- MIA – Cortland Finnegan 50-yard fumble return (Caleb Sturgis kick), 3:59. Dolphins 38–7.

**Fourth quarter**

- OAK – Andre Holmes 22-yard pass from Matt McGloin (Sebastian Janikowski kick), 8:36. Dolphins 38–14. **Drive: 9 plays, 90 yards, 3:14.**

**Top passers**

- MIA – Ryan Tannehill – 23/31, 278 yards, 2 TD, INT
- OAK – Derek Carr – 16/25, 146 yards, TD, INT

**Top rushers**

- MIA – Lamar Miller – 12 rushes, 64 yards, 2 TD
- OAK – Darren McFadden – 11 rushes, 40 yards

**Top receivers**

- MIA – Brian Hartline – 6 receptions, 74 yards
- OAK – James Jones – 6 receptions, 83 yards

==== Week 6: vs. Green Bay Packers ====
Week Six: Green Bay Packers at Miami Dolphins – Game summary

Quarter	1	2	3	4	Total
**Packers**	7	3	7	10	**27**
Dolphins	3	0	7	14	**24**

at Sun Life Stadium, Miami Gardens, Florida

- Date: October 12
- Game time: 1:00 p.m. EDT
- Game weather: 86 °F (30 °C), sunny
- Game attendance: 70,875
- Referee: Bill Vinovich
- TV announcers (Fox): Sam Rosen, John Lynch and Pam Oliver
- Recap, Gamebook

Game information

**First quarter**

- GB – Jordy Nelson 9-yard pass from Aaron Rodgers (Mason Crosby kick), 10:09. Packers 7–0. **Drive: 9 plays, 80 yards, 4:51.**
- MIA – Caleb Sturgis 48-yard field goal, 8:15. Packers 7–3. **Drive: 6 plays, 20 yards, 1:54.**

**Second quarter**

- GB – Mason Crosby 43-yard field goal, 8:08. Packers 10–3. **Drive: 6 plays, 11 yards, 3:49.**

**Third quarter**

- MIA – Jarvis Landry 11-yard pass from Ryan Tannehill (Caleb Sturgis kick), 11:48. Tied 10–10. **Drive: 5 plays, 80 yards, 3:12.**
- GB – Randall Cobb 5-yard pass from Aaron Rodgers (Mason Crosby kick), 3:44. Packers 17–10. **Drive: 13 plays, 80 yards, 8:04.**

**Fourth quarter**

- MIA – Lamar Miller 5-yard run (Caleb Sturgis kick), 13:42. Tied 17–17. **Drive: 10 plays, 80 yards, 5:02.**
- MIA – Mike Wallace 5-yard pass from Ryan Tannehill (Caleb Sturgis kick), 9:13. Dolphins 24–17. **Drive: 6 plays, 79 yards, 3:12.**
- GB – Mason Crosby 30-yard field goal, 4:09. Dolphins 24–20. **Drive: 11 plays, 68 yards, 5:04.**
- GB – Andrew Quarless 4-yard pass from Aaron Rodgers (Mason Crosby kick), 0:03. Packers 27–24. **Drive: 11 plays, 60 yards, 2:01.**

**Top passers**

- GB – Aaron Rodgers – 24/42, 264 yards, 3 TD
- MIA – Ryan Tannehill – 20/31, 244 yards, 2 TD, INT

**Top rushers**

- GB – Eddie Lacy – 14 rushes, 40 yards
- MIA – Lamar Miller – 14 rushes, 53 yards, TD

**Top receivers**

- GB – Jordy Nelson – 9 receptions, 107 yards, TD
- MIA – Jarvis Landry – 6 receptions, 75 yards, TD

==== Week 7: at Chicago Bears ====
Week Seven: Miami Dolphins at Chicago Bears – Game summary

Quarter	1	2	3	4	Total
**Dolphins**	7	7	7	6	**27**
Bears	0	0	7	7	**14**

at Soldier Field, Chicago, Illinois

- Date: October 19
- Game time: 1:00 p.m. EDT/12:00 p.m. CDT
- Game weather: 50 °F (10 °C), partly cloudy
- Game attendance: 62,413
- Referee: Pete Morelli
- TV announcers (CBS): Greg Gumbel, Trent Green and Evan Washburn
- Recap, Gamebook

Game information

**First quarter**

- MIA – Charles Clay 13-yard pass from Ryan Tannehill (Caleb Sturgis kick), 6:51. Dolphins 7–0. **Drive: 8 plays, 81 yards, 4:24.**

**Second quarter**

- MIA – Mike Wallace 10-yard pass from Ryan Tannehill (Caleb Sturgis kick), 5:20. Dolphins 14–0. **Drive: 3 plays, 23 yards, 1:33.**

**Third quarter**

- CHI – Matt Forte 10-yard pass from Jay Cutler (Robbie Gould kick), 7:59. Dolphins 14–7. **Drive: 12 plays, 80 yards, 7:01.**
- MIA – Lamar Miller 2-yard run (Caleb Sturgis kick), 0:31. Dolphins 21–7. **Drive: 13 plays, 83 yards, 7:28.**

**Fourth quarter**

- MIA – Caleb Sturgis 33-yard field goal, 13:32. Dolphins 24–7. **Drive: 4 plays, 2 yards, 0:52.**
- CHI – Matt Forte 1-yard run (Robbie Gould kick), 7:38. Dolphins 24–14. **Drive: 6 plays, 73 yards, 2:05.**
- MIA – Caleb Sturgis 19-yard field goal, 2:13. Dolphins 27–14. **Drive: 12 plays, 65 yards, 5:25.**

**Top passers**

- MIA – Ryan Tannehill – 25/32, 277 yards, 2 TD
- CHI – Jay Cutler – 21/34, 190 yards, TD, INT

**Top rushers**

- MIA – Lamar Miller – 18 rushes, 61 yards, TD
- CHI – Matt Forte – 12 rushes, 49 yards, TD

**Top receivers**

- MIA – Charles Clay – 4 receptions, 58 yards, TD
- CHI – Matt Forte – 6 receptions, 60 yards, TD

==== Week 8: at Jacksonville Jaguars ====
Week Eight: Miami Dolphins at Jacksonville Jaguars – Game summary

Quarter	1	2	3	4	Total
**Dolphins**	0	10	14	3	**27**
Jaguars	0	3	3	7	**13**

at EverBank Field, Jacksonville, Florida

- Date: October 26
- Game time: 1:00 p.m. EDT
- Game weather: 76 °F (24 °C), clear
- Game attendance: 65,633
- Referee: Jerome Boger
- TV announcers (CBS): Andrew Catalon, Steve Beuerlein and Steve Tasker
- Recap, Gamebook

Game information

**First quarter**

- No scoring plays.

**Second quarter**

- MIA – Louis Delmas 81-yard interception return (Caleb Sturgis kick), 14:46. Dolphins 7–0.
- JAX – Josh Scobee 30-yard field goal, 6:28. Dolphins 7–3. **Drive: 14 plays, 66 yards, 8:18.**
- MIA – Caleb Sturgis 43-yard field goal, 0:58. Dolphins 10–3. **Drive: 11 plays, 52 yards, 3:23.**

**Third quarter**

- MIA – Brent Grimes 22-yard interception return (Caleb Sturgis kick), 12:16. Dolphins 17–3.
- JAX – Josh Scobee 40-yard field goal, 7:55. Dolphins 17–6. **Drive: 10 plays, 58 yards, 4:21.**
- MIA – Rishard Matthews 3-yard pass from Ryan Tannehill (Caleb Sturgis kick), 2:18. Dolphins 24–6. **Drive: 7 plays, 95 yards, 3:32.**

**Fourth quarter**

- MIA – Caleb Sturgis 29-yard field goal, 3:54. Dolphins 27–6. **Drive: 9 plays, 68 yards, 4:27.**
- JAX – Allen Robinson 48-yard pass from Blake Bortles (Josh Scobee kick), 2:19. Dolphins 27–13. **Drive: 5 plays, 80 yards, 1:35.**

**Top passers**

- MIA – Ryan Tannehill – 16/29, 196 yards, TD, INT
- JAX – Blake Bortles – 18/34, 221 yards, TD, 2 INT

**Top rushers**

- MIA – Lamar Miller – 14 rushes, 78 yards
- JAX – Denard Robinson – 18 rushes, 108 yards

**Top receivers**

- MIA – Mike Wallace – 2 receptions, 59 yards
- JAX – Allen Robinson – 5 receptions, 82 yards, TD

==== Week 9: vs. San Diego Chargers ====
Week Nine: San Diego Chargers at Miami Dolphins – Game summary

Quarter	1	2	3	4	Total
Chargers	0	0	0	0	**0**
**Dolphins**	7	13	17	0	**37**

at Sun Life Stadium, Miami Gardens, Florida

- Date: November 2
- Game time: 1:00 p.m. EST
- Game weather: 70 °F (21 °C), sunny
- Game attendance: 70,222
- Referee: Brad Allen
- TV announcers (CBS): Ian Eagle, Dan Fouts and Jenny Dell
- Recap, Gamebook

Game information

**First quarter**

- MIA – Charles Clay 6-yard pass from Ryan Tannehill (Caleb Sturgis kick), 1:40. Dolphins 7–0. **Drive: 10 plays, 77 yards, 5:56.**

**Second quarter**

- MIA – Lamar Miller 2-yard run (Caleb Sturgis kick), 11:08. Dolphins 14–0. **Drive: 8 plays, 62 yards, 3:41.**
- MIA – Caleb Sturgis 26-yard field goal, 8:53. Dolphins 17–0. **Drive: 5 plays, 23 yards, 1:58.**
- MIA – Caleb Sturgis 25-yard field goal, 1:52. Dolphins 20–0. **Drive: 11 plays, 63 yards, 5:51.**

**Third quarter**

- MIA – Rishard Matthews 21-yard pass from Ryan Tannehill (Caleb Sturgis kick), 11:02. Dolphins 27–0. **Drive: 8 plays, 72 yards, 3:58.**
- MIA – Caleb Sturgis 23-yard field goal, 7:04. Dolphins 30–0. **Drive: 6 plays, 14 yards, 2:01.**
- MIA – Jarvis Landry 14-yard pass from Ryan Tannehill (Caleb Sturgis kick), 2:00. Dolphins 37–0. **Drive: 1 play, 14 yards, 0:05.**

**Fourth quarter**

- No scoring plays.

**Top passers**

- SD – Philip Rivers – 12/23, 138 yards, 3 INT
- MIA – Ryan Tannehill – 24/34, 288 yds, 3 TD

**Top rushers**

- SD – Donald Brown – 4 rushes, 23 yards
- MIA – Lamar Miller – 11 rushes, 49 yards, TD

**Top receivers**

- SD – Malcom Floyd – 4 receptions, 60 yards
- MIA – Charles Clay – 5 receptions, 65 yards, TD

==== Week 10: at Detroit Lions ====
Week Ten: Miami Dolphins at Detroit Lions – Game summary

Quarter	1	2	3	4	Total
Dolphins	0	3	10	3	**16**
**Lions**	10	0	0	10	**20**

at Ford Field, Detroit, Michigan

- Date: November 9
- Game time: 1:00 p.m. EST
- Game weather: Played indoors (dome stadium)
- Game attendance: 63,179
- Referee: Bill Leavy
- TV announcers (CBS): Ian Eagle, Dan Fouts and Jenny Dell
- Recap, Gamebook

Game information

**First quarter**

- DET – Matt Prater 26-yard field goal, 6:19. Lions 3–0. **Drive: 15 plays, 72 yards, 8:41.**
- DET – Calvin Johnson 49-yard pass from Matthew Stafford (Matt Prater kick), 3:58. Lions 10–0. **Drive: 1 play, 49 yards, 0:08.**

**Second quarter**

- MIA – Caleb Sturgis 23-yard field goal, 0:13. Lions 10–3. **Drive: 14 plays, 75 yards, 5:09.**

**Third quarter**

- MIA – Caleb Sturgis 50-yard field goal, 8:24. Lions 10–6. **Drive: 7 plays, 25 yards, 2:52.**
- MIA – Mike Wallace 3-yard pass from Ryan Tannehill (Caleb Sturgis kick), 1:17. Dolphins 13–10. **Drive: 1 play, 3 yards, 0:05.**

**Fourth quarter**

- DET – Matt Prater 50-yard field goal, 12:02. Tied 13–13. **Drive: 8 plays, 50 yards, 4:15.**
- MIA – Caleb Sturgis 20-yard field goal, 4:19. Dolphins 16–13. **Drive: 13 plays, 70 yards, 7:43.**
- DET – Theo Riddick 11-yard pass from Matthew Stafford (Matt Prater kick), 0:29. Lions 20–16. **Drive: 11 plays, 74 yards, 2:44.**

**Top passers**

- MIA – Ryan Tannehill – 27/38, 207 yards, TD, INT
- DET – Matthew Stafford – 25/40, 280 yards, 2 TD, INT

**Top rushers**

- MIA – Damien Williams – 7 rushes, 34 yards
- DET – Joique Bell – 10 rushes, 44 yards

**Top receivers**

- MIA – Jarvis Landry – 7 receptions, 53 yards
- DET – Calvin Johnson – 7 receptions, 113 yards, TD

==== Week 11: vs. Buffalo Bills ====
Week Eleven: Buffalo Bills at Miami Dolphins – Game summary

Quarter	1	2	3	4	Total
Bills	3	3	3	0	**9**
**Dolphins**	3	0	9	10	**22**

at Sun Life Stadium, Miami Gardens, Florida

- Date: November 13
- Game time: 8:25 p.m. EST
- Game weather: 74 °F (23 °C), clear
- Game attendance: 71,573
- Referee: Walt Coleman
- TV announcers (NFLN): Jim Nantz, Phil Simms and Tracy Wolfson
- Recap, Gamebook

Game information

**First quarter**

- MIA – Caleb Sturgis 38-yard field goal, 6:40. Dolphins 3–0. **Drive: 14 plays, 68 yards, 8:20.**
- BUF – Dan Carpenter 33-yard field goal, 0:13. Tied 3–3. **Drive: 14 plays, 67 yards, 6:27.**

**Second quarter**

- BUF – Dan Carpenter 21-yard field goal, 3:26. Bills 6–3. **Drive: 17 plays, 85 yards, 9:24.**

**Third quarter**

- BUF – Dan Carpenter 46-yard field goal, 6:26. Bills 9–3. **Drive: 8 plays, 49 yards, 3:27.**
- MIA – Brandon Gibson 7-yard pass from Ryan Tannehill (Caleb Sturgis kick), 2:18. Dolphins 10–9. **Drive: 9 plays, 80 yards, 4:08.**
- MIA – Penalty on Kyle Orton enforced in the endzone for a safety, 1:08. Dolphins 12–9.

**Fourth quarter**

- MIA – Jarvis Landry 8-yard pass from Ryan Tannehill (Caleb Sturgis kick), 11:35. Dolphins 19–9. **Drive: 6 plays, 63 yards, 3:18.**
- MIA – Caleb Sturgis 38-yard field goal, 3:01. Dolphins 22–9. **Drive: 4 plays, -2 yards, 0:18.**

**Top passers**

- BUF – Kyle Orton – 22/39, 193 yards
- MIA – Ryan Tannehill – 26/34, 240 yards, 2 TD

**Top rushers**

- BUF – Anthony Dixon – 10 rushes, 35 yards
- MIA – Lamar Miller – 15 rushes, 86 yards

**Top receivers**

- BUF – Chris Hogan – 7 receptions, 74 yards
- MIA – Brian Hartline – 3 receptions, 55 yards

==== Week 12: at Denver Broncos ====
Week Twelve: Miami Dolphins at Denver Broncos – Game summary

Quarter	1	2	3	4	Total
Dolphins	7	14	7	8	**36**
**Broncos**	3	14	0	22	**39**

at Sports Authority Field at Mile High, Denver, Colorado

- Date: November 23
- Game time: 4:25 p.m. EST/2:25 p.m. MST
- Game weather: 39 °F (4 °C), mostly cloudy
- Game attendance: 76,987
- Referee: Jeff Triplette
- TV announcers (CBS): Jim Nantz, Phil Simms and Tracy Wolfson
- Recap, Gamebook

Game information

**First quarter**

- MIA – Daniel Thomas 3-yard run (Caleb Sturgis kick), 11:22. Dolphins 7–0. **Drive: 7 plays, 80 yards, 3:38.**
- DEN – Brandon McManus 38-yard field goal, 4:10. Dolphins 7–3. **Drive: 12 plays, 53 yards, 7:12.**

**Second quarter**

- MIA – Ryan Tannehill 1-yard run (Caleb Sturgis kick), 12:53. Dolphins 14–3. **Drive: 8 plays, 47 yards, 3:47.**
- DEN – Demaryius Thomas 5-yard pass from Peyton Manning (Brandon McManus kick), 7:08. Dolphins 14–10. **Drive: 11 plays, 77 yards, 5:45.**
- MIA – Mike Wallace 10-yard pass from Ryan Tannehill (Caleb Sturgis kick), 1:54. Dolphins 21–10. **Drive: 10 plays, 87 yards, 5:14.**
- DEN – Demaryius Thomas 14-yard pass from Peyton Manning (Brandon McManus kick), 0:12. Dolphins 21–17. **Drive: 8 plays, 80 yards, 1:42.**

**Third quarter**

- MIA – Jarvis Landry 5-yard pass from Ryan Tannehill (Caleb Sturgis kick), 2:11. Dolphins 28–17. **Drive: 4 plays, 12 yards, 1:09.**

**Fourth quarter**

- DEN – Demaryius Thomas 5-yard pass from Peyton Manning (Peyton Manning-Emmanuel Sanders pass), 14:09. Dolphins 28–25. **Drive: 9 plays, 60 yards, 3:02.**
- DEN – C. J. Anderson 10-yard run (Brandon McManus kick), 5:01. Broncos 32–28. **Drive: 11 plays, 70 yards, 6:16.**
- DEN – Wes Welker 2-yard pass from Peyton Manning (Brandon McManus kick), 3:13. Broncos 39–28. **Drive: 2 plays, 8 yards, 0:17.**
- MIA – Jarvis Landry 1-yard pass from Ryan Tannehill (Daniel Thomas run), 1:34. Broncos 39–36. **Drive: 9 plays, 84 yards, 1:34.**

**Top passers**

- MIA – Ryan Tannehill – 26/36, 228 yards, 3 TD, INT
- DEN – Peyton Manning – 28/35, 257 yards, 4 TD

**Top rushers**

- MIA – Lamar Miller – 12 rushes, 59 yards
- DEN – C. J. Anderson – 27 rushes, 167 yards, TD

**Top receivers**

- MIA – Jarvis Landry – 7 receptions, 50 yards, 2 TD
- DEN – Emmanuel Sanders – 9 receptions, 125 yards

==== Week 13: at New York Jets ====
Week Thirteen: Miami Dolphins at New York Jets – Game summary

Quarter	1	2	3	4	Total
**Dolphins**	0	3	3	10	**16**
Jets	7	3	3	0	**13**

at MetLife Stadium, East Rutherford, New Jersey

- Date: December 1
- Game time: 8:30 p.m. EST
- Game weather: 42 °F (6 °C), rain
- Game attendance: 78,160
- Referee: Ron Torbert
- TV announcers (ESPN): Mike Tirico, Jon Gruden and Lisa Salters
- Recap, Gamebook

Game information

**First quarter**

- NYJ – Greg Salas 20-yard run (Nick Folk kick), 7:45. Jets 7–0. **Drive: 6 plays, 85 yards, 2:58.**

**Second quarter**

- NYJ – Nick Folk 40-yard field goal, 12:01. Jets 10–0. **Drive: 10 p;ays, 44 yards, 4:46.**
- MIA – Caleb Sturgis 43-yard field goal, 0:00. Jets 10–3. **Drive: 10 plays, 37 yards, 3:23.**

**Third quarter**

- MIA – Caleb Sturgis 44-yard field goal, 10:56. Jets 10–6. **Drive: 8 plays, 49 yards, 4:04.**
- NYJ – Nick Folk 45-yard field goal, 7:17. Jets 13–6. **Drive: 7 plays, 33 yards, 3:39.**

**Fourth quarter**

- MIA – Lamar Miller 4-yard run (Caleb Sturgis kick), 10:24. Tied 13–13. **Drive: 6 plays, 39 yards, 2:29.**
- MIA – Caleb Sturgis 26-yard field goal, 1:57. Dolphins 16–13. **Drive: 9 plays, 57 yards, 3:45.**

**Top passers**

- MIA – Ryan Tannehill – 25/35, 235 yards, INT
- NYJ – Geno Smith – 7/13, 65 yards, INT

**Top rushers**

- MIA – Lamar Miller – 13 rushes, 56 yards, TD
- NYJ – Chris Johnson – 17 rushes, 105 yards

**Top receivers**

- MIA – Mike Wallace – 6 receptions, 69 yards
- NYJ – Zach Sudfeld – 1 reception, 20 yards

==== Week 14: vs. Baltimore Ravens ====
Week Fourteen: Baltimore Ravens at Miami Dolphins – Game summary

Quarter	1	2	3	4	Total
**Ravens**	0	7	7	14	**28**
Dolphins	10	0	0	3	**13**

at SunLife Stadium, Miami Gardens, Florida

- Date: December 7
- Game time: 1:00 p.m. EST
- Game weather: 76 °F (24 °C), sunny
- Game attendance: 70,244
- Referee: John Parry
- TV announcers (CBS): Andrew Catalon, Steve Beuerlein and Steve Tasker
- Recap, Gamebook

Game information

**First quarter**

- MIA – Caleb Sturgis 44-yard field goal, 9:28. Dolphins 3–0. **Drive: 7 plays, 36 yards, 4:02.**
- MIA – Brian Hartline 3-yard pass from Ryan Tannehill (Caleb Sturgis kick), 1:41. Dolphins 10–0. **Drive: 11 plays, 66 yards, 5:27.**

**Second quarter**

- BAL – Steve Smith Sr. 1-yard pass from Joe Flacco (Justin Tucker kick), 0:02. Dolphins 10–7. **Drive: 12 plays, 97 yards, 3:06.**

**Third quarter**

- BAL – Kamar Aiken 13-yard pass from Joe Flacco (Justin Tucker kick), 6:14. Ravens 14–10. **Drive: 11 plays, 75 yards, 5:18.**

**Fourth quarter**

- MIA – Caleb Sturgis 34-yard field goal, 12:41. Ravens 14–13. **Drive: 8 plays, 27 yards, 3:43.**
- BAL – Justin Forsett 2-yard run (Justin Tucker kick), 8:09. Ravens 21–13. **Drive: 9 plays, 80 yards, 4:32.**
- BAL – Joe Flacco 1-yard run (Justin Tucker kick), 3:34. Ravens 28–13. **Drive: 7 plays, 81 yards, 2:54.**

**Top passers**

- BAL – Joe Flacco – 25/33, 269 yards, 2 TD, INT
- MIA – Ryan Tannehill – 23/33, 227 yards, TD

**Top rushers**

- BAL – Justin Forsett – 13 rushes, 71 yards, TD
- MIA – Lamar Miller – 12 rushes, 53 yards

**Top receivers**

- BAL – Steve Smith Sr. – 7 receptions, 70 yards, TD
- MIA – Jarvis Landry – 6 receptions, 55 yards

==== Week 15: at New England Patriots ====
Week Fifteen: Miami Dolphins at New England Patriots – Game summary

Quarter	1	2	3	4	Total
Dolphins	3	10	0	0	**13**
**Patriots**	7	7	24	3	**41**

at Gillette Stadium, Foxborough, Massachusetts

- Date: December 14
- Game time: 1:00 p.m. EST
- Game weather: 43 °F (6 °C), sunny
- Game attendance: 68,756
- Referee: Bill Vinovich
- TV announcers (CBS): Ian Eagle, Dan Fouts and Jenny Dell
- Recap, Gamebook

Game information

**First quarter**

- NE – Kyle Arrington 62-yard blocked field goal return (Stephen Gostkowski kick), 12:36. Patriots 7–0.
- MIA – Caleb Sturgis 24-yard field goal, 0:59. Patriots 7–3. **Drive: 9 plays, 60 yards, 4:47.**

**Second quarter**

- NE – Shane Vereen 3-yard run (Stephen Gostkowski kick), 7:59. Patriots 14–3. **Drive: 3 plays, 8 yards, 0:42.**
- MIA – Caleb Sturgis 53-yard field goal, 4:26. Patriots 14–6. **Drive: 7 plays, 38 yards, 3:33.**
- MIA – Mike Wallace 32-yard pass from Ryan Tannehill (Caleb Sturgis kick), 0:05. Patriots 14–13. **Drive: 1 play, 32 yards, 0:06.**

**Third quarter**

- NE – LeGarrette Blount 3-yard run (Stephen Gostkowski kick), 11:04. Patriots 21–13. **Drive: 8 plays, 79 yards, 3:56.**
- NE – Stephen Gostkowski 35-yard field goal, 4:43. Patriots 24–13. **Drive: 10 plays, 47 yards, 4:03.**
- NE – Rob Gronkowski 27-yard pass from Tom Brady (Stephen Gostkowski kick), 4:30. Patriots 31–13. **Drive: 1 play, 27 yards, 0:05.**
- NE – Julian Edelman 6-yard pass from Tom Brady (Stephen Gostkowski kick), 1:29. Patriots 38–13. **Drive: 3 plays, 47 yards, 1:19.**

**Fourth quarter**

- NE – Stephen Gostkowski 36-yard field goal, 6:20. Patriots 41–13. **Drive: 11 plays, 67 yards, 4:26.**

**Top passers**

- MIA – Ryan Tannehill – 29/47, 346 yards, TD, 2 INT
- NE – Tom Brady: 21/35, 287 yards, 2 TD, INT

**Top rushers**

- MIA – Lamar Miller: 16 rushes, 47 yards
- NE – Jonas Gray: 11 rushes, 62 yards

**Top receivers**

- MIA – Mike Wallace: 5 receptions, 104 yards, TD
- NE – Rob Gronkowski: 3 receptions, 96 yards, TD

==== Week 16: vs. Minnesota Vikings ====
Week Sixteen: Minnesota Vikings at Miami Dolphins – Game summary

Quarter	1	2	3	4	Total
Vikings	7	10	0	18	**35**
**Dolphins**	0	7	7	23	**37**

at Sun Life Stadium, Miami Gardens, Florida

- Date: December 21
- Game time: 1:00 p.m. EST
- Game weather: 80 °F (27 °C), partly cloudy
- Game attendance: 66,203
- Referee: Tony Corrente
- TV announcers (Fox): Kenny Albert, Daryl Johnston and Tony Siragusa
- Recap, Gamebook

Game information

**First quarter**

- MIN – Matt Asiata 1-yard run (Blair Walsh kick), 4:23. Vikings 7–0. **Drive: 10 plays, 54 yards, 5:36.**

**Second quarter**

- MIN – Greg Jennings 21-yard pass from Teddy Bridgewater (Blair Walsh kick), 11:34. Vikings 14–0. **Drive: 3 plays, 23 yards, 0:49.**
- MIA – Dion Sims 14-yard pass from Ryan Tannehill (Caleb Sturgis kick), 4:53. Vikings 14–7. **Drive: 12 plays, 92 yards, 6:41.**
- MIN – Blair Walsh 18-yard field goal, 0:02. Vikings 17–7. **Drive: 10 plays, 86 yards, 1:04.**

**Third quarter**

- MIA – Mike Wallace 16-yard pass from Ryan Tannehill (Caleb Sturgis kick), 8:29. Vikings 17–14. **Drive: 6 plays, 80 yards, 4:03.**

**Fourth quarter**

- MIA – Lamar Miller 1-yard run (Caleb Sturgis kick), 14:57. Dolphins 21–17. **Drive: 9 plays, 64 yards, 3:39.**
- MIN – Blair Walsh 20-yard field goal, 9:52. Dolphins 21–20. **Drive: 9 plays, 64 yards, 5:05.**
- MIA – Mike Wallace 7-yard pass from Ryan Tannehill (Caleb Sturgis kick), 6:39. Dolphins 28–20. **Drive: 8 plays, 80 yards, 3:03.**
- MIN – Jarius Wright 8-yard pass from Teddy Bridgewater (Matt Asiata run), 4:46. Tied 28–28. **Drive: 5 plays, 60 yards, 1:53.**
- MIN – Matt Asiata 5-yard run (Blair Walsh kick), 4:35. Vikings 35–28. **Drive: 1 play, 5 yards, 0:05.**
- MIA – Damien Williams 3-yard pass from Ryan Tannehill (Caleb Sturgis kick), 1:11. Tied 35–35. **Drive: 11 plays, 80 yards, 3:24.**
- MIA – Jeff Locke punt blocked out of bounds in endzone by Terrence Fede for a safety, 0:41. Dolphins 37–35.

**Top passers**

- MIN – Teddy Bridgewater - 19-26, 259 yards, 2 TD, INT
- MIA – Ryan Tannehill - 35-47, 396 yards, 4 TD, INT

**Top rushers**

- MIN – Matt Asiata - 16 rushes, 58 yards, 2 TD
- MIA – Lamar Miller - 19 rushes, 92 yards, TD

**Top receivers**

- MIN – Greg Jennings - 3 receptions, 56 yards, TD
- MIA – Charles Clay - 6 receptions, 114 yds

**Top tacklers**

- MIN – Robert Blanton - 9 tackles, 2 assists
- MIA – Koa Misi - 6 tackles, 1 assists

The game's overtime ended when defensive end Terrence Fede blocked a punt to the endzone for a safety. Despite the win, the Dolphins were eliminated from playoff contention after the Steelers beat the Chiefs on the same day.

==== Week 17: vs. New York Jets ====
Week Seventeen: New York Jets at Miami Dolphins – Game summary

Quarter	1	2	3	4	Total
**Jets**	7	7	10	13	**37**
Dolphins	3	14	7	0	**24**

at Sun Life Stadium, Miami Gardens, Florida

- Date: December 28
- Game time: 1:00 p.m. EST
- Game weather: 80 °F (27 °C), partly cloudy
- Game attendance: 70,220
- Referee: Craig Wrolstad
- TV announcers (CBS): Andrew Catalon, Steve Beuerlein and Steve Tasker
- Recap, Gamebook

Game information

**First quarter**

- MIA – Caleb Sturgis 37-yard field goal, 6:13. Dolphins 3–0. **Drive: 8 plays, 46 yards, 4:18.**
- NYJ – Chris Owusu 23-yard run (Nick Folk kick), 3:11. Jets 7–3. **Drive: 6 plays, 78 yards, 3:02.**

**Second quarter**

- MIA – Daniel Thomas 1-yard run (Caleb Sturgis kick), 10:44. Dolphins 10–7. **Drive: 5 plays, 21 yards, 2:43.**
- NYJ – Chris Ivory 8-yard pass from Geno Smith (Nick Folk kick), 6:44. Jets 14–10. **Drive: 7 plays, 79 yards, 4:00.**
- MIA – Charles Clay 23-yard pass from Ryan Tannehill (Caleb Sturgis kick), 0:43. Dolphins 17–14. **Drive: 11 plays, 93 yards, 2:49.**

**Third quarter**

- MIA – Lamar Miller 97-yard run (Caleb Sturgis kick), 12:51. Dolphins 24–14. **Drive: 1 play, 97 yards, 0:14.**
- NYJ – Eric Decker 74-yard pass from Geno Smith (Nick Folk kick), 11:35. Dolphins 24–21. **Drive: 3 plays, 80 yards, 1:16.**
- NYJ – Nick Folk 26-yard field goal, 6:35. Tied 24–24. **Drive: 7 plays, 56 yards, 2:54.**

**Fourth quarter**

- NYJ – Nick Folk 23-yard field goal, 14:12. Jets 27–24. **Drive: 11 plays, 78 yards, 5:05.**
- NYJ – Jeff Cumberland 23-yard pass from Geno Smith (Nick Folk kick), 3:22. Jets 34–24. **Drive: 6 plays, 73 yards, 2:24.**
- NYJ – Nick Folk 39-yard field goal, 0:31. Jets 37–24. **Drive: 4 plays, 0 yards, 1:40.**

**Top passers**

- NYJ – Geno Smith – 20/25, 358 yards, 3 TD
- MIA – Ryan Tannehill – 23/39, 259 yards, TD

**Top rushers**

- NYJ – Chris Ivory – 13 rushes, 29 yards
- MIA – Lamar Miller – 19 rushes, 178 yards, TD

**Top receivers**

- NYJ – Eric Decker – 10 receptions, 221 yards, TD
- MIA – Brian Hartline – 5 receptions, 94 yards

== Standings ==
=== Division ===
AFC East
	W	L	T	PCT	DIV	CONF	PF	PA	STK
^{(1)} New England Patriots	12	4	0	.750	4–2	9–3	468	313	L1
Buffalo Bills	9	7	0	.563	4–2	5–7	343	289	W1
Miami Dolphins	8	8	0	.500	3–3	6–6	388	373	L1
New York Jets	4	12	0	.250	1–5	4–8	283	401	W1

=== Conference ===
AFC
#	Team	Division	W	L	T	PCT	DIV	CONF	SOS	SOV	STK
Division leaders
1 (Note: New England defeated Denver head-to-head (Week 9, 43–21).)	New England Patriots	East	12	4	0	.750	4–2	9–3	.514	.487	L1
2	Denver Broncos	West	12	4	0	.750	6–0	10–2	.521	.484	W1
3 (Note: Pittsburgh defeated Indianapolis head-to-head (Week 8, 51–34).)	Pittsburgh Steelers	North	11	5	0	.688	4–2	9–3	.451	.486	W4
4	Indianapolis Colts	South	11	5	0	.688	6–0	9–3	.479	.372	W1
Wild Cards
5	Cincinnati Bengals	North	10	5	1	.656	3–3	7–5	.498	.425	L1
6	Baltimore Ravens	North	10	6	0	.625	3–3	6–6	.475	.378	W1
Did not qualify for the postseason
7 (Note: Kansas City finished ahead of San Diego in the AFC West based on head-to-head sweep (Week 7, 23–20; Week 17, 19–7). Houston finished ahead of Kansas City and Buffalo based on conference record. Kansas City finished ahead of Buffalo based on head-to-head victory (Week 10, 17–13). San Diego finished ahead of Buffalo based on head-to-head victory (Week 3, 22–10).)	Houston Texans	South	9	7	0	.563	4–2	8–4	.447	.299	W2
8	Kansas City Chiefs	West	9	7	0	.563	3–3	7–5	.512	.500	W1
9	San Diego Chargers	West	9	7	0	.563	2–4	6–6	.512	.403	L1
10	Buffalo Bills	East	9	7	0	.563	4–2	5–7	.516	.486	W1
11	Miami Dolphins	East	8	8	0	.500	3–3	6–6	.512	.406	L1
12	Cleveland Browns	North	7	9	0	.438	2–4	4–8	.479	.371	L5
13	New York Jets	East	4	12	0	.250	1–5	4–8	.543	.375	W1
14 (Note: Jacksonville finished ahead of Oakland based on record vs. common opponents (1–4 to 0–5).)	Jacksonville Jaguars	South	3	13	0	.188	1–5	2–10	.514	.313	L1
15	Oakland Raiders	West	3	13	0	.188	1–5	2–10	.570	.542	L1
16	Tennessee Titans	South	2	14	0	.125	1–5	2–10	.506	.375	L10
Tiebreakers (Note: When breaking ties for three or more teams under the NFL's rules, they are first broken within divisions, then comparing only the highest ranked remaining team from each division.)
