= 2015 Miami Dolphins season =

50th season in franchise history

- Owner: Stephen M. Ross
- General manager: Dennis Hickey
- Head coach: Joe Philbin (fired on October 5; 1–3 record); Dan Campbell (interim; 5–7 record)
- Home stadium: Sun Life Stadium

Results
- Record: 6–10
- Division place: 4th AFC East
- Playoffs: Did not qualify
- Pro Bowlers: Mike Pouncey, C Branden Albert, OT; Jarvis Landry, WR; Reshad Jones, SS; Brent Grimes, CB

Uniform
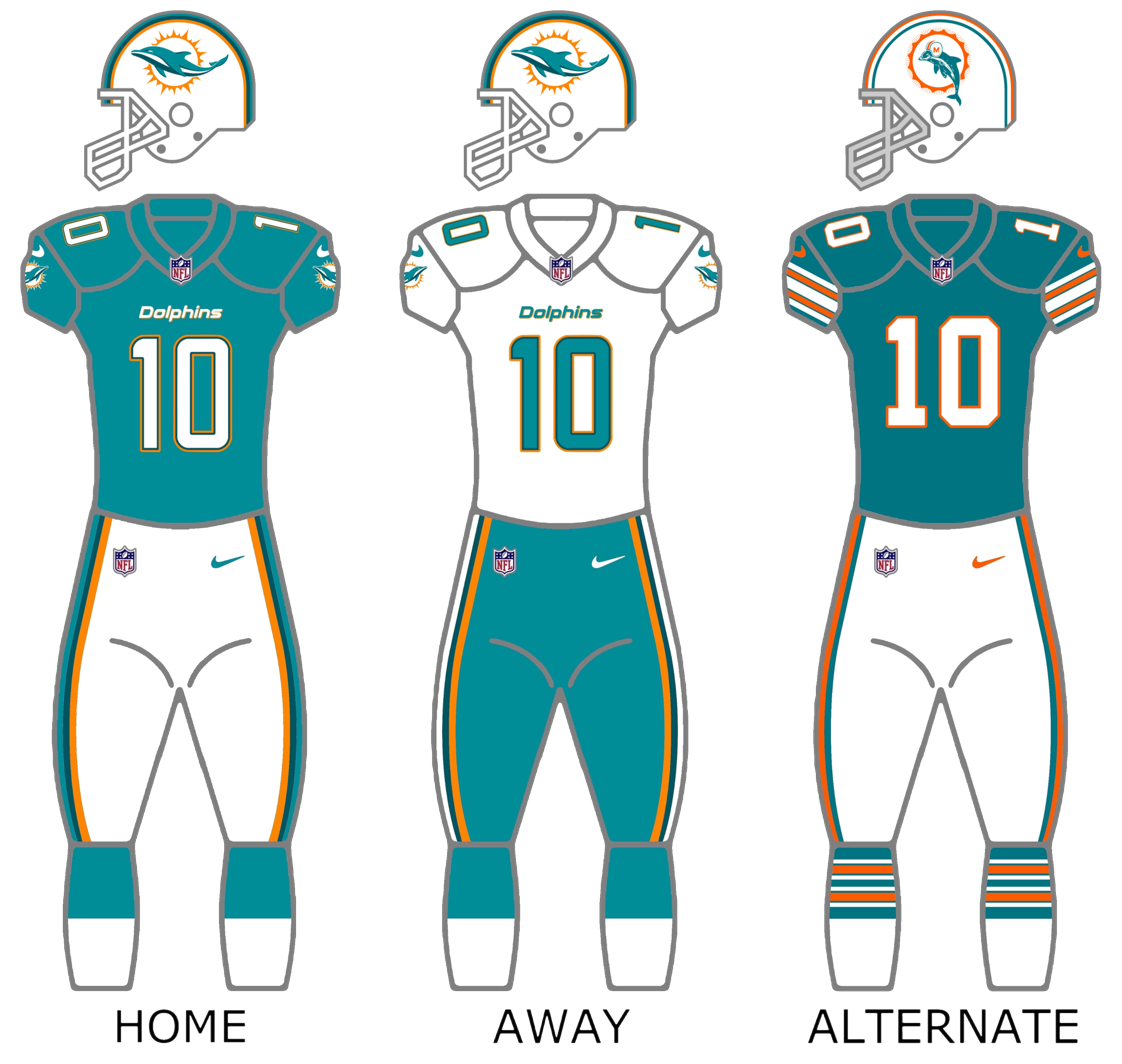

The 2015 season was the Miami Dolphins' 46th in the National Football League (NFL) and their 50th overall. The Dolphins looked to improve on their 8–8 record from 2014 and return to the playoffs for the first time in seven seasons. However, Miami failed to clinch a playoff berth for the seventh consecutive season after a Week 14 loss to the New York Giants.

The Dolphins entered 2015 with Joe Philbin as their head coach for a fourth season. After the team started 1−3, Philbin was fired by the Dolphins. Dan Campbell, the team's tight ends coach, served as the interim head coach for the remainder of the season and recorded a 5−7 record.

Highlights from the season include the Dolphins' first-ever victory over the Houston Texans, their first win over the Philadelphia Eagles since 1999, and their first road win over the Washington Redskins since 1984.

== Free agents ==
Position	Player	Tag	2015 Team	Notes
QB	Matt Moore	UFA	Miami Dolphins	
S	Louis Delmas	UFA	Miami Dolphins	
RB	Knowshon Moreno	UFA		
DT	Jared Odrick	UFA	Jacksonville Jaguars	
G	Daryn Colledge	UFA		
C	Samson Satele	UFA		
TE	Charles Clay	UFA	Buffalo Bills	
S	Jimmy Wilson	UFA	San Diego Chargers	
LB	Kelvin Sheppard	UFA	Miami Dolphins	
DE	Derrick Shelby	RFA	Miami Dolphins	
LB	Jonathan Freeny	RFA	New England Patriots	
RB	Daniel Thomas	UFA	Chicago Bears	
S	Michael Thomas	ERFA	Miami Dolphins	
RB	LaMichael James	UFA	Miami Dolphins	
S	Jordan Kovacs	ERFA	Miami Dolphins	
CB	R.J. Stanford	RFA		
TE	Gerell Robinson	ERFA		
C	Sam Brenner	ERFA	Miami Dolphins	
RB	Jerome Messam	RFA		

== 2015 draft ==
2015 Miami Dolphins Draft
Round	Selection	Player	Position	College
1	14	DeVante Parker	WR	Louisville
2	52	Jordan Phillips	DT	Oklahoma
4	114	Jamil Douglas	G	Arizona State
5	145	Bobby McCain	CB	Memphis
5	149	Jay Ajayi	RB	Boise State
5	150	Cedric Thompson	FS	Minnesota
5	156	Tony Lippett	CB	Michigan State

Notable undrafted free agents

2015 Miami Dolphins Draft
Round	Selection	Player	Position	College
—	—	Matt Darr	Punter	Tennessee
—	—	Andrew Franks	Placekicker	RPI
—	—	Neville Hewitt	Linebacker	Marshall

Notes

- The Dolphins traded their second-round selection (No. 47 overall) to the Philadelphia Eagles in exchange for Philadelphia's second-round (No. 52 overall) and two fifth-round selections (No. 145 and 156 overall).
- The Dolphins traded their third-round selection (No. 78 overall) and linebacker Dannell Ellerbe to the New Orleans Saints in exchange for wide receiver Kenny Stills.
- The Dolphins acquired an additional fifth-round selection (No. 149 overall) in a trade that sent their seventh-round selection (No. 232 overall — previously acquired in a trade that sent offensive tackle Jonathan Martin to the San Francisco 49ers) and wide receiver Mike Wallace to the Minnesota Vikings.
- The Dolphins traded their original seventh-round selection (No. 231 overall) to the Baltimore Ravens in exchange for offensive tackle Bryant McKinnie during the 2013 season.

== Staff ==
2015 Miami Dolphins staff
Front office: Chairman/managing general partner – Stephen Ross; Vice chairman/partner – Jorge Perez; Vice chairman – Don Shula; President/CEO – Tom Garfinkel; General manager – Dennis Hickey; Assistant general manager – Eric Stokes; Executive vice president of football administration – Dawn Aponte; Executive vice president of football operations – Mike Tannenbaum; Manager of football administration – Ryan Herman; Director of player personnel – Joe Schoen; Director of college scouting – Chris Grier; Director of pro scouting – Anthony Hunt; Head coaches: Head coach – Joe Philbin (fired on October 5); Interim head coach – Dan Campbell; Assistant head coach/special teams coordinator – Darren Rizzi; Offensive coaches: Offensive coordinator/quarterbacks – Zac Taylor; Running backs – Jeff Nixon; Wide receivers – Phil McGeoghan; Tight ends – Dan Campbell (promoted to interim head coach on October 5); Tight ends – Ben Johnson; Assistant tight ends – Mike Wahle; Offensive line – John Benton; Assistant offensive line – Jack Bicknell Jr.; Offensive assistant – Ben Martin; Senior offensive assistant – Al Saunders; Senior offensive assistant – Ken O'Keefe	Defensive coaches: Interim Defensive coordinator/defensive backs– Lou Anarumo; Defensive line – Terrell Williams; Assistant defensive line – Charlie Bullen; Linebackers – Mark Duffner; Assistant linebackers – David Corrao; Assistant defensive backs – Blue Adams; Assistant defensive backs – Jeff Burris; Special teams coaches: Assistant special teams coordinator – Marwan Maalouf; Strength and conditioning: Head strength and conditioning – Darren Krein; Assistant strength and conditioning – David Puloka; Sports science analyst – Dave Regan

== Final roster ==
2015 Miami Dolphins roster
Quarterbacks (QB): 8 Matt Moore; 17 Ryan Tannehill; 5 Logan Thomas; Running backs (RB): 23 Jay Ajayi; 26 Lamar Miller; 34 Damien Williams; Wide receivers (WR): 83 Matt Hazel; 85 Greg Jennings; 14 Jarvis Landry; 11 DeVante Parker; 10 Kenny Stills; Tight ends (TE): 84 Jordan Cameron; 80 Dion Sims; 86 Jake Stoneburner	Offensive linemen (OL): 76 Branden Albert T; 75 Jamil Douglas G; 74 Jason Fox T; 70 Ja'Wuan James T; 68 Ulrick John T; 66 Jacques McClendon G; 51 Mike Pouncey C; 64 Shelley Smith G; 63 Dallas Thomas G; 77 Billy Turner G; Defensive linemen (DL): 62 Deandre Coleman DT; 98 Quinton Coples DE; 78 Terrence Fede DE; 90 Earl Mitchell DT; 57 Damontre Moore DE; 97 Jordan Phillips DT; 79 Derrick Shelby DE; 93 Ndamukong Suh DT; 50 Olivier Vernon DE	Linebackers (LB): 46 Neville Hewitt OLB; 45 Mike Hull MLB; 53 Jelani Jenkins OLB; 56 James-Michael Johnson MLB; 42 Spencer Paysinger OLB; 52 Kelvin Sheppard MLB; 49 Zach Vigil OLB; Defensive backs (DB): 35 Walt Aikens FS; 27 Shamiel Gary SS; 21 Brent Grimes CB; 20 Reshad Jones SS; 36 Tony Lippett CB; 28 Bobby McCain CB; 24 Brice McCain CB; 29 Tyler Patmon CB; 22 Jamar Taylor CB; 31 Michael Thomas FS; Special teams (ST): 4 Matt Darr P; 92 John Denney LS; 3 Andrew Franks K	Practice squad: 32 Jahwan Edwards RB; 16 Robert Herron WR; 47 Terrell Manning OLB; 71 Vinston Painter G; 65 Anthony Steen C; 30 Dax Swanson CB; 41 Cedric Thompson FS; 73 Julius Warmsley DE; 69 Jordan Williams DE; Reserve: 25 Louis Delmas FS (IR); 95 Dion Jordan DE (Susp.); 18 Rishard Matthews WR (IR); 58 Chris McCain OLB (IR); 55 Koa Misi OLB (IR); 96 Robert Thomas DT (IR); 91 Cameron Wake DE (IR); 88 Brandon Williams TE (IR); Rookies in italics 53 active, 8 reserve, 9 practice squad

== Preseason ==
Week	Date	Opponent	Result	Record	Venue	Recap
1	August 13	at Chicago Bears	L 10–27	0–1	Soldier Field	Recap
2	August 22	at Carolina Panthers	L 30–31	0–2	Bank of America Stadium	Recap
3	August 29	Atlanta Falcons	W 13–9	1–2	Sun Life Stadium	Recap
4	September 3	Tampa Bay Buccaneers	L 17–22	1–3	Sun Life Stadium	Recap

== Regular season ==
=== Schedule ===
Week	Date	Opponent	Result	Record	Venue	Recap
1	September 13	at Washington Redskins	**W** 17–10	1–0	FedExField	Recap
2	September 20	at Jacksonville Jaguars	**L** 20–23	1–1	EverBank Field	Recap
3	September 27	**Buffalo Bills**	**L** 14–41	1–2	Sun Life Stadium	Recap
4	October 4	**New York Jets**	**L** 14–27	1–3	(United Kingdom) Wembley Stadium (London)	Recap
5	Bye					
6	October 18	at Tennessee Titans	**W** 38–10	2–3	Nissan Stadium	Recap
7	October 25	Houston Texans	**W** 44–26	3–3	Sun Life Stadium	Recap
8	October 29	at **New England Patriots**	**L** 7–36	3–4	Gillette Stadium	Recap
9	November 8	at **Buffalo Bills**	**L** 17–33	3–5	Ralph Wilson Stadium	Recap
10	November 15	at Philadelphia Eagles	**W** 20–19	4–5	Lincoln Financial Field	Recap
11	November 22	Dallas Cowboys	**L** 14–24	4–6	Sun Life Stadium	Recap
12	November 29	at **New York Jets**	**L** 20–38	4–7	MetLife Stadium	Recap
13	December 6	Baltimore Ravens	**W** 15–13	5–7	Sun Life Stadium	Recap
14	December 14	New York Giants	**L** 24–31	5–8	Sun Life Stadium	Recap
15	December 20	at San Diego Chargers	**L** 14–30	5–9	Qualcomm Stadium	Recap
16	December 27	Indianapolis Colts	**L** 12–18	5–10	Sun Life Stadium	Recap
17	January 3	**New England Patriots**	**W** 20–10	6–10	Sun Life Stadium	Recap

Note: Intra-division opponents are in bold text.

=== Game summaries ===
==== Week 1: at Washington Redskins ====
Week One: Miami Dolphins at Washington Redskins – Game summary

Quarter	1	2	3	4	Total
**Dolphins**	0	7	0	10	**17**
Redskins	3	7	0	0	**10**

at FedExField, Landover, Maryland

- Date: September 13
- Game time: 1:00 p.m. EDT
- Game weather: 69 °F (21 °C), partly cloudy
- Game attendance: 76,512
- Referee: Walt Coleman
- TV announcers (CBS): Ian Eagle, Dan Fouts and Evan Washburn
- Recap, Gamebook

Game information

**First quarter**

- WAS – Kai Forbath 45-yard field goal, Redskins 3–0. **Drive: 12 plays, 53 yards, 7:21.**

**Second quarter**

- WAS – Jordan Reed 4-yard pass from Kirk Cousins (Kai Forbath kick), Redskins 10–0. **Drive: 17 plays, 88 yards, 8:49.**
- MIA – Rishard Matthews 3-yard pass from Ryan Tannehill (Andrew Franks kick), Redskins 10–7. **Drive: 9 plays, 80 yards, 1:22.**

**Third quarter** No scoring **Fourth quarter**

- MIA – Andrew Franks 22-yard field goal, Tied 10–10. **Drive: 10 plays, 76 yards, 5:13.**
- MIA – Jarvis Landry 69-yard punt return (Andrew Franks kick), Dolphins 17–10. **Drive: 3 plays, -5 yards, 1:12.**

**Top passers**

- MIA – Ryan Tannehill- 22/34, 236 yards, 2 TDs
- WAS – Kirk Cousins- 21/31, 196 yards, 1 TD, 2 INTS

**Top rushers**

- MIA – Lamar Miller- 13 rushes, 53 yards
- WAS – Alfred Morris- 25 rushes, 121 yards

**Top receivers**

- MIA – Jordan Cameron- 4 receptions, 73 yards
- WAS – Pierre Garcon- 8 receptions, 74 yards

**Top tacklers**

- MIA – Reshad Jones- 12 tackles
- WAS – DeAngelo Hall- 8 tackles

With the win, the Dolphins started 1-0 for the second straight year. This was the Dolphins' first road win over the Redskins since their 1984 Super Bowl season.

==== Week 2: at Jacksonville Jaguars ====
Week Two: Miami Dolphins at Jacksonville Jaguars – Game summary

Quarter	1	2	3	4	Total
Dolphins	3	10	7	0	**20**
**Jaguars**	10	10	0	3	**23**

at EverBank Field, Jacksonville, Florida

- Date: September 20
- Game time: 4:05 p.m. EDT
- Game weather: 87 °F (31 °C), zero percent chance of rain
- Game attendance: 65,443
- Referee: John Parry
- TV announcers (CBS): Andrew Catalon, Steve Beuerlein and Steve Tasker
- Preview, Gamebook

Game information

**First quarter**

- JAX – Allen Robinson 3-yard pass from Blake Bortles (Jason Myers kick), Jaguars 7–0. **Drive: 10 plays, 82 yards, 5:39.**
- MIA – Andrew Franks 48-yard field goal, Jaguars 7–3. **Drive: 5 plays, 50 yards, 2:05.**
- JAX – Jason Myers 27-yard field goal, Jaguars 10–3. **Drive: 8 plays, 71 yards, 3:56.**

**Second quarter**

- MIA – Andrew Franks 41-yard field goal, Jaguars 10–6. **Drive: 10 plays, 56 yards, 4:36.**
- JAX – Allen Robinson 46-yard pass from Blake Bortles (Jason Myers kick), Jaguars 17–6. **Drive: 9 plays, 91 yards, 5:05.**
- MIA – Damien Williams 10-yard pass from Ryan Tannehill (Andrew Franks kick), Jaguars 17–13. **Drive: 7 plays, 82 yards, 3:15.**
- JAX – Jason Myers 58-yard field goal, Jaguars 20–13. **Drive: 3 plays, 27 yards, 0:18.**

**Third quarter**

- MIA – Jake Stoneburner 5-yard pass from Ryan Tannehill (Andrew Franks kick), Tied 20–20. **Drive: 8 plays, 80 yards, 4:32.**

**Fourth quarter**

- JAX – Jason Myers 28-yard field goal, Jaguars 23–20. **Drive: 9 plays, 66 yards, 1:08.**

**Top passers**

- MIA – Ryan Tannehill – 30/44, 359 yards, 2 TD
- JAX – Blake Bortles – 18/33, 273 yards, 2 TD

**Top rushers**

- MIA – Ryan Tannehill – 3 rushes, 17 yards
- JAX – T. J. Yeldon – 25 rushes, 70 yards

**Top receivers**

- MIA – Jarvis Landry – 8 receptions, 110 yards
- JAX – Allen Robinson – 6 receptions, 155 yards, 2 TD

**Top tacklers**

- MIA – Jelani Jenkins – 9 tackles, 3 assists
- JAX – Telvin Smith – 6 tackles, 3 assists

Jacksonville kicker Jason Myers would kick the game winning 28-yard field goal with under 2 minutes left to give the Jaguars the win.

With the loss, the Dolphins fell to 1–1.

==== Week 3: vs. Buffalo Bills ====
Week Three: Buffalo Bills at Miami Dolphins – Game summary

Quarter	1	2	3	4	Total
**Bills**	14	13	0	14	**41**
Dolphins	0	0	8	6	**14**

at Sun Life Stadium, Miami Gardens, Florida

- Date: September 27
- Game time: 4:25 p.m. EDT
- Game weather: 87 °F (31 °C), mostly cloudy
- Game attendance: 64,869
- Referee: Jerome Boger
- TV announcers (CBS): Spero Dedes and Solomon Wilcots
- Recap, Gamebook

Game information

**First quarter**

- BUF – Charles Clay 25-yard pass from Tyrod Taylor (Dan Carpenter kick), Bills 7–0. **Drive: 5 plays, 77 yards, 2:17.**
- BUF – LeSean McCoy 10-yard pass from Tyrod Taylor (Dan Carpenter kick), Bills 14–0. **Drive: 8 plays, 81 yards, 3:40.**

**Second quarter**

- BUF – Dan Carpenter 26-yard field goal, Bills 17–0. **Drive: 9 plays, 57 yards, 5:00.**
- BUF – Preston Brown 43-yard interception return (Dan Carpenter kick), Bills 24–0. **Drive: 6 plays, 39 yards, 1:15.**
- BUF – Dan Carpenter 51-yard field goal, Bills 27–0. **Drive: 4 plays, 16 yards, 0:42.**

**Third quarter** MIA – Rishard Matthews 21-yard pass from Ryan Tannehill (Ryan Tannehill to Jarvis Landry for two-point conversion), Bills 27–8. **Drive: 6 plays, 56 yards, 3:14.** **Fourth quarter**

- BUF – Chris Hogan 38-yard pass from Tyrod Taylor (Dan Carpenter kick), Bills 34–8. **Drive: 11 plays, 80 yards, 5:46.**
- MIA – Rishard Matthews 46-yard pass from Ryan Tannehill (kick failed), Bills 34–14. **Drive: 4 plays, 48 yards, 0:51.**
- BUF – Karlos Williams 41-yard run (Dan Carpenter kick), Bills 41–14. **Drive: 2 plays, 44 yards, 1:10.**

**Top passers**

- BUF – Tyrod Taylor – 21/29, 277 yards, 3 TDs
- MIA – Ryan Tannehill – 26/39, 297 yards, 2 TDs, 3 INTS

**Top rushers**

- BUF – Karlos Williams – 12 rushes, 110 yards, 1 TD
- MIA – Jonas Gray – 9 rushes, 49 yards

**Top receivers**

- BUF – Charles Clay – 5 receptions, 82 yards, 1 TD
- MIA – Rishard Matthews – 6 receptions, 113 yards, 2 TDs

**Top tacklers**

- BUF – Corey Graham – 12 tackles
- MIA – Reshad Jones – 9 tackles

Ryan Tannehill would be intercepted 3 times in this game, including a pick 6 by Preston Brown, and the Bills trounced Miami in their home opener 41–14.

With the embarrassing loss, the Dolphins fell to 1–2. This was also the worst home opening defeat in franchise history.

==== Week 4: vs. New York Jets ====
NFL International Series

Week Four: New York Jets at Miami Dolphins – Game summary

Quarter	1	2	3	4	Total
**Jets**	10	10	7	0	**27**
Dolphins	0	7	0	7	**14**

at Wembley Stadium, London, England

- Date: October 4
- Game time: 2:30 p.m. BST/9:30 a.m. EDT
- Game weather: 59 °F (15 °C), sunny
- Game attendance: 83,986
- Referee: Craig Wrolstad
- TV announcers (CBS): Ian Eagle, Dan Fouts and Evan Washburn
- Recap, Gamebook

Game information

**First quarter** **Second quarter** **Third quarter** **Fourth quarter**

**Top passers**

- NYJ –
- MIA –

**Top rushers**

- NYJ –
- MIA –

**Top receivers**

- NYJ –
- MIA –

**Top tacklers**

- NYJ –
- MIA –

The Dolphins were considered the home team in the season's first International Series game. They lost dropping them to 1-3 heading into their bye week. A day later, Head Coach Joe Philbin was fired following a 24–28 record with no postseason appearances. Tight Ends Coach Dan Campbell was his replacement serving as an Interim head coach.

==== Week 6: at Tennessee Titans ====
Week Six: Miami Dolphins at Tennessee Titans – Game summary

Quarter	1	2	3	4	Total
**Dolphins**	10	7	7	14	**38**
Titans	3	0	7	0	**10**

at Nissan Stadium, Nashville, Tennessee

- Date: October 18
- Game time: 1:00 p.m. EDT/12:00 p.m. CDT
- Game weather: 56 °F (13 °C), sunny
- Game attendance: 62,342
- Referee: Jeff Triplette
- TV announcers (CBS): Andrew Catalon, Steve Beuerlein and Steve Tasker
- Recap, Gamebook

Game information

**First quarter** **Second quarter** **Third quarter** **Fourth quarter**

**Top passers**

- MIA –
- TEN –

**Top rushers**

- MIA –
- TEN –

**Top receivers**

- MIA –
- TEN –

**Top tacklers**

- MIA –
- TEN –

On a day in which Miami fans traveled well to seemingly outnumber Tennessee fans, the Dolphins would pick up their first win under Dan Campbell.

With the win, Miami improved to 2–3.

==== Week 7: vs. Houston Texans ====
Week Seven: Houston Texans at Miami Dolphins – Game summary

Quarter	1	2	3	4	Total
Texans	0	0	13	13	**26**
**Dolphins**	21	20	0	3	**44**

at Sun Life Stadium, Miami Gardens, Florida

- Date: October 25
- Game time: 1:00 p.m. EDT
- Game weather: 84 °F (29 °C), cloudy
- Game attendance: 65,251
- Referee: John Hussey
- TV announcers (CBS): Spero Dedes and Solomon Wilcots
- Recap, Gamebook

Game information

**First quarter** **Second quarter** **Third quarter** **Fourth quarter**

**Top passers**

- HOU –
- MIA –

**Top rushers**

- HOU –
- MIA –

**Top receivers**

- HOU –
- MIA –

**Top tacklers**

- HOU –
- MIA –

The Dolphins thoroughly dominated the first half, scoring 6 touchdowns for a 41–0 halftime lead. With the win, the Miami Dolphins defeated the Houston Texans for the first time in franchise history. This was also the first time since 2003 that the Dolphins scored over 40 points in a game.

==== Week 8: at New England Patriots ====
Week Eight: Miami Dolphins at New England Patriots – Game summary

Quarter	1	2	3	4	Total
Dolphins	0	0	7	0	**7**
**Patriots**	7	12	3	14	**36**

at Gillette Stadium, Foxborough, Massachusetts

- Date: October 29
- Game time: 8:25 p.m. EDT
- Game weather: 58 °F (14 °C), cloudy and windy
- Game attendance: 66,829
- Referee: Pete Morelli
- TV announcers (CBS/NFLN): Jim Nantz, Phil Simms and Tracy Wolfson
- Recap, Gamebook

Game information

**First quarter** **Second quarter** **Third quarter** **Fourth quarter**

**Top passers**

- MIA –
- NE –

**Top rushers**

- MIA –
- NE –

**Top receivers**

- MIA –
- NE –

**Top tacklers**

- MIA –
- NE –

The Dolphins travel to New England to take on the undefeated Patriots. The Dolphins looked to end the streak of the Super Bowl champions, but it was too late as Miami struggled offensively and defensively all game.

Cameron Wake left the game with an Achilles tear. The Dolphins later announced that he would miss the rest of the season. He finished the game with two tackles and a sack.

==== Week 9: at Buffalo Bills ====
Week Nine: Miami Dolphins at Buffalo Bills – Game summary

Quarter	1	2	3	4	Total
Dolphins	0	7	7	3	**17**
**Bills**	9	10	7	7	**33**

at Ralph Wilson Stadium, Orchard Park, New York

- Date: November 8
- Game time: 1:00 p.m. EST
- Game weather: 49 °F (9 °C), sunny with some clouds
- Game attendance: 70,214
- Referee: Carl Cheffers
- TV announcers (CBS): Spero Dedes and Solomon Wilcots
- Recap, Gamebook

Game information

**First quarter** **Second quarter** **Third quarter** **Fourth quarter**

**Top passers**

- MIA –
- BUF –

**Top rushers**

- MIA –
- BUF –

**Top receivers**

- MIA –
- BUF –

**Top tacklers**

- MIA –
- BUF –

With the loss, the Dolphins fell to 3-5 and were swept by Buffalo for the first time since 2013.

==== Week 10: at Philadelphia Eagles ====
Week Ten: Miami Dolphins at Philadelphia Eagles – Game summary

Quarter	1	2	3	4	Total
**Dolphins**	3	10	0	7	**20**
Eagles	16	0	0	3	**19**

at Lincoln Financial Field, Philadelphia, Pennsylvania

- Date: November 15
- Game time: 1:00 p.m. EST
- Game weather: 59 °F (15 °C), sunny
- Game attendance: 69,596
- Referee: Terry McAulay
- TV announcers (CBS): Kevin Harlan and Rich Gannon
- Recap, Gamebook

Game information

**First quarter** **Second quarter** **Third quarter** **Fourth quarter**

**Top passers**

- MIA –
- PHI –

**Top rushers**

- MIA –
- PHI –

**Top receivers**

- MIA –
- PHI –

**Top tacklers**

- MIA –
- PHI –

The Dolphins would trail 16–3 at one point, but they would come back to beat Philadelphia. Near the end of the game, Reshad Jones intercepted Eagles backup quarterback Mark Sanchez to seal the game. This was the Dolphins' first win over the Eagles since 1999.

With the win, Miami improved to 4–5.

==== Week 11: vs. Dallas Cowboys ====
Week Eleven: Dallas Cowboys at Miami Dolphins – Game summary

Quarter	1	2	3	4	Total
**Cowboys**	0	14	0	10	**24**
Dolphins	0	7	7	0	**14**

at Sun Life Stadium, Miami Gardens, Florida

- Date: November 22
- Game time: 1:00 p.m. EST
- Game weather: 74 °F (23 °C), mostly cloudy
- Game attendance: 65,115
- Referee: Jeff Triplette
- TV announcers (Fox): Kevin Burkhardt, John Lynch and Peter Schrager
- Recap, Gamebook

Game information

**First quarter**

- No scoring plays.

**Second quarter**

- DAL – Rolando McClain 12-yard interception return (Dan Bailey kick), 15:00. Cowboys 7–0.
- DAL – Terrance Williams 31-yard pass from Tony Romo (Dan Bailey kick), 1:23. Cowboys 14–0. **Drive: 12 plays, 93 yards, 8:30.**
- MIA – Jordan Cameron 12-yard pass from Ryan Tannehill (Andrew Franks kick), 0:23. Cowboys 14–7. **Drive: 3 plays, 54 yards, 0:52.**

**Third quarter**

- MIA – Kenny Stills 29-yard pass from Ryan Tannehill (Andrew Franks kick), 5:26. Tied 14–14. **Drive: 5 plays, 58 yards, 1:53.**

**Fourth quarter**

- DAL – Dez Bryant 16-yard pass from Tony Romo (Dan Bailey kick), 15:00. Cowboys 21–14. **Drive: 8 plays, 80 yards, 5:25.**
- DAL – Dan Bailey 30-yard field goal, 9:23. Cowboys 24–14. **Drive: 7 plays, 10 yards, 4:49.**

**Top passers**

- DAL – Tony Romo – 18/28, 227 yards, 2 TD, 2 INT
- MIA – Ryan Tannehill – 13/24, 188 yards, 2 TD, INT

**Top rushers**

- DAL – Darren McFadden – 29 rushes, 129 yards
- MIA – Lamar Miller – 7 rushes, 44 yards

**Top receivers**

- DAL – Terrance Williams – 4 receptions, 79 yards, TD
- MIA – Jarvis Landry – 4 receptions, 66 yards

**Top tacklers**

- DAL – Sean Lee - 4 tackles
- MIA – Kelvin Sheppard - 10 tackles, 4 assists

Tony Romo started this game for Dallas, and the Cowboys would snap their 7-game losing streak, while the Dolphins failed to get into any rhythm on offense or defense in the game. The Dolphins were also seeking a home win over the Cowboys for the first time since 1984. This game is known for being Romo's last win in the NFL.

With the tough loss, the Dolphins fell to 4–6.

==== Week 12: at New York Jets ====
Week Twelve: Miami Dolphins at New York Jets – Game summary

Quarter	1	2	3	4	Total
Dolphins	0	0	7	13	**20**
**Jets**	7	7	7	17	**38**

at MetLife Stadium, East Rutherford, New Jersey

- Date: November 29
- Game time: 1:00 p.m. EST
- Game weather: 45 °F (7 °C), sunny
- Game attendance: 78,160
- Referee: Bill Vinovich
- TV announcers (CBS): Ian Eagle, Dan Fouts and Evan Washburn
- Recap, Gamebook

Game information

**First quarter** **Second quarter** **Third quarter** **Fourth quarter**

**Top passers**

- MIA –
- NYJ –

**Top rushers**

- MIA –
- NYJ –

**Top receivers**

- MIA –
- NYJ –

**Top tacklers**

- MIA –
- NYJ –

With the loss, the Dolphins fell to 4–7.

==== Week 13: vs. Baltimore Ravens ====
Week Thirteen: Baltimore Ravens at Miami Dolphins – Game summary

Quarter	1	2	3	4	Total
Ravens	0	3	7	3	**13**
**Dolphins**	0	15	0	0	**15**

at Sun Life Stadium, Miami Gardens, Florida

- Date: December 6
- Game time: 1:00 p.m. EST
- Game weather: 80 °F (27 °C), cloudy
- Game attendance: 64,519
- Referee: John Parry
- TV announcers (CBS): Andrew Catalon, Steve Beuerlein and Steve Tasker
- Recap, Gamebook

Game information

**First quarter** **Second quarter** **Third quarter** **Fourth quarter**

**Top passers**

- BAL –
- MIA –

**Top rushers**

- BAL –
- MIA –

**Top receivers**

- BAL –
- MIA –

**Top tacklers**

- BAL –
- MIA –

With the win, Miami kept their slim playoff hopes alive, and improved to 5–7.

==== Week 14: vs. New York Giants ====
Week Fourteen: New York Giants at Miami Dolphins – Game summary

Quarter	1	2	3	4	Total
**Giants**	3	14	7	7	**31**
Dolphins	7	10	7	0	**24**

at Sun Life Stadium, Miami Gardens, Florida

- Date: December 14
- Game time: 8:30 p.m. EST
- Game weather: 77 °F (25 °C), clear
- Game attendance: 65,408
- Referee: Craig Wrolstad
- TV announcers (ESPN): Mike Tirico, Jon Gruden and Lisa Salters
- Recap, Gamebook

Game information

**First quarter** **Second quarter** **Third quarter** **Fourth quarter**

**Top passers**

- NYG –
- MIA –

**Top rushers**

- NYG –
- MIA –

**Top receivers**

- NYG –
- MIA –

**Top tacklers**

- NYG –
- MIA –

With the loss, the Dolphins fell to 5–8 (2-2 against the NFC East), and they were officially eliminated from playoff contention for the 7th straight year, a franchise record. They also fell to 0–4 all time against the Giants at home.

==== Week 15: at San Diego Chargers ====
Week Fifteen: Miami Dolphins at San Diego Chargers – Game summary

Quarter	1	2	3	4	Total
Dolphins	0	0	7	7	**14**
**Chargers**	6	17	0	7	**30**

at Qualcomm Stadium, San Diego, California

- Date: December 20
- Game time: 4:25 p.m. EST/1:25 p.m. PST
- Game weather: 61 °F (16 °C), fair
- Game attendance: 66,676
- Referee: John Hussey
- TV announcers (CBS): Andrew Catalon, Steve Beuerlein, Steve Tasker and Scott Kaplan
- Recap, Gamebook

Game information

**First quarter** **Second quarter** **Third quarter** **Fourth quarter**

**Top passers**

- MIA –
- SD –

**Top rushers**

- MIA –
- SD –

**Top receivers**

- MIA –
- SD –

**Top tacklers**

- MIA –
- SD –

With the loss, the Dolphins fell to 5–9 and they finished 3-5 on the road.

==== Week 16: vs. Indianapolis Colts ====
Week Sixteen: Indianapolis Colts at Miami Dolphins – Game summary

Quarter	1	2	3	4	Total
**Colts**	8	7	0	3	**18**
Dolphins	0	6	3	3	**12**

at Sun Life Stadium, Miami Gardens, Florida

- Date: December 27
- Game time: 1:00 p.m. EST
- Game weather: 82 °F (28 °C), partly cloudy
- Game attendance: 65,482
- Referee: Gene Steratore
- TV announcers (Fox): Dick Stockton, David Diehl and Kristina Pink
- Recap, Gamebook

Game information

**First quarter** **Second quarter** **Third quarter** **Fourth quarter**

**Top passers**

- IND –
- MIA –

**Top rushers**

- IND –
- MIA –

**Top receivers**

- IND –
- MIA –

**Top tacklers**

- IND –
- MIA –

With the loss, the Dolphins fell to 5–10 (1-3 against the AFC South), and with Buffalo defeating Dallas the same day, they were assured last place in their division.

==== Week 17: vs. New England Patriots ====
Week Seventeen: New England Patriots at Miami Dolphins – Game summary

Quarter	1	2	3	4	Total
Patriots	0	3	7	0	**10**
**Dolphins**	3	7	0	10	**20**

at Sun Life Stadium, Miami Gardens, Florida

- Date: January 3, 2016
- Game time: 1:00 p.m. EST
- Game weather: 80 °F (27 °C), cloudy
- Game attendance: 62,918
- Referee: Ed Hochuli
- TV announcers (CBS): Kevin Harlan and Rich Gannon
- Recap, Gamebook

Game information

**First quarter** **Second quarter** **Third quarter** **Fourth quarter**

**Top passers**

- NE –
- MIA –

**Top rushers**

- NE –
- MIA –

**Top receivers**

- NE –
- MIA –

**Top tacklers**

- NE –
- MIA –

With the stunning win, the Dolphins ended their 50th season at 6-10 (1-5 against the AFC East) and kept the Patriots from clinching home field advantage in the AFC Playoffs. Miami also finished 3-5 at home.

== Standings ==
=== Division ===
AFC East
	W	L	T	PCT	DIV	CONF	PF	PA	STK
^{(2)} New England Patriots	12	4	0	.750	4–2	9–3	465	315	L2
New York Jets	10	6	0	.625	3–3	7–5	387	314	L1
Buffalo Bills	8	8	0	.500	4–2	7–5	379	359	W2
Miami Dolphins	6	10	0	.375	1–5	4–8	310	389	W1

=== Conference ===
AFC
#	Team	Division	W	L	T	PCT	DIV	CONF	SOS	SOV	STK
Division Leaders
1 (Note: Denver finished ahead of New England and Cincinnati for the No. 1 seed based on head-to-head sweep. New England finished ahead of Cincinnati for the No. 2 seed based on record vs. common opponents — New England's cumulative record against Buffalo, Denver, Houston and Pittsburgh was 4–1, while Cincinnati's cumulative record against the same four teams was 2–3.)	Denver Broncos	West	12	4	0	.750	4–2	8–4	.500	.479	W2
2	New England Patriots	East	12	4	0	.750	4–2	9–3	.473	.448	L2
3	Cincinnati Bengals	North	12	4	0	.750	5–1	9–3	.477	.406	W1
4	Houston Texans	South	9	7	0	.563	5–1	7–5	.496	.410	W3
Wild Cards
5	Kansas City Chiefs	West	11	5	0	.688	5–1	10–2	.496	.432	W10
6 (Note: Pittsburgh finished ahead of the New York Jets for the No. 6 seed and qualified for the last playoff spot based on record vs. common opponents — Pittsburgh's cumulative record against Cleveland, Indianapolis, New England and Oakland was 4–1, while the Jets' cumulative record against the same four teams was 3–2.)	Pittsburgh Steelers	North	10	6	0	.625	3–3	7–5	.504	.463	W1
Did not qualify for the postseason
7	New York Jets	East	10	6	0	.625	3–3	7–5	.441	.388	L1
8 (Note: Buffalo finished ahead of Indianapolis based on head-to-head victory.)	Buffalo Bills	East	8	8	0	.500	4–2	7–5	.508	.438	W2
9	Indianapolis Colts	South	8	8	0	.500	4–2	6–6	.500	.406	W2
10	Oakland Raiders	West	7	9	0	.438	3–3	7–5	.512	.366	L1
11	Miami Dolphins	East	6	10	0	.375	1–5	4–8	.469	.469	W2
12 (Note: Jacksonville finished ahead of Baltimore based on head-to-head victory.)	Jacksonville Jaguars	South	5	11	0	.313	2–4	5–7	.473	.375	L3
13	Baltimore Ravens	North	5	11	0	.313	3–3	4–8	.508	.425	L1
14	San Diego Chargers	West	4	12	0	.250	0–6	3–9	.527	.328	L2
15 (Note: Cleveland finished ahead of Tennessee based on head-to-head victory.)	Cleveland Browns	North	3	13	0	.188	1–5	2–10	.531	.271	L3
16	Tennessee Titans	South	3	13	0	.188	1–5	1–11	.492	.375	L4
Tiebreakers (Note: When breaking ties for three or more teams under the NFL's rules, they are first broken within divisions, then comparing only the highest ranked remaining team from each division.)
