= Ryan Ficken =

American football coach (born 1980)

Los Angeles Chargers
- Title: Special teams coordinator

Personal information
- Born: February 20, 1980 (age 46); Aurora, Colorado, U.S.
- Listed height: 5 ft 10 in (1.78 m)
- Listed weight: 165 lb (75 kg)

Career information
- Position: Wide receiver
- High school: Fruita Monument
- College: Arizona State (1998–1999)

Career history
- UCLA (2004–2006) Graduate assistant; Minnesota Vikings (2007–2021); Assistant running backs coach (2007–2008); Assistant wide receivers coach (2009–2012); Assistant special teams coach (2013–2020); Special teams coordinator (2021); Los Angeles Chargers (2022–present) Special teams coordinator

Ryan Ficken (born February 20, 1980) is an American professional football coach and former wide receiver who is currently the special teams coordinator for the Los Angeles Chargers of the National Football League (NFL).

== Coaching career ==
After spending a few years working with the offensive line at UCLA as a graduate assistant. In 2007 Ficken made the leap to the NFL becoming the assistant running backs coach for the Minnesota Vikings. In 2009 he would switch positions and become the assistant wide receivers coach. After the 2012 season Ficken again switched positions becoming the teams assistant special teams coach. For the 2021 season Ficken was named the Vikings special teams coordinator replacing Marwan Maalouf.

On February 3, 2022, Ficken was hired by the Los Angeles Chargers as their special teams coordinator under head coach Brandon Staley. Following the 2023 season and the firing of Staley, Ficken was retained by new head coach Jim Harbaugh.

== Personal life ==
Ficken and wife, Andrea, have three children, Wyatt, Jonathan, and Gianna. When at ASU, he was a member of Gamma Beta Phi, the National Scholastic Honor Society.
