= Lowell Rose =

American football player (born 1990)

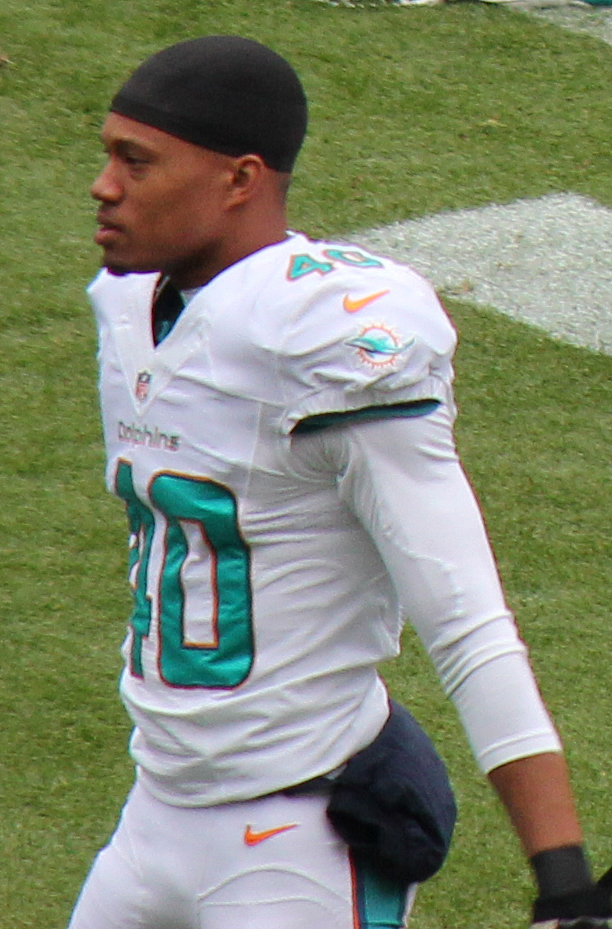
- Rose with the Miami Dolphins in 2014

No. 40
- Position: Cornerback

Personal information
- Born: March 11, 1990 (age 36); Los Angeles, California, U.S.
- Listed height: 6 ft 0 in (1.83 m)
- Listed weight: 192 lb (87 kg)

Career information
- High school: Culver City (Culver City, California)
- College: Tulsa
- NFL draft: 2013: undrafted

Career history
- San Francisco 49ers (2013)*; Spokane Shock (2013–2014); New York Jets (2014)*; San Diego Chargers (2014)*; Miami Dolphins (2014); San Diego Chargers (2015)*; Los Angeles KISS (2016)*
- * Offseason or practice squad member only

Career NFL statistics
- Total tackles: 1
- Stats at Pro Football Reference

Lowell Rose (born March 11, 1990) is an American former professional football player who was a cornerback in the National Football League (NFL). He signed with the San Francisco 49ers as undrafted free agent in 2013. He played college football for the Tulsa Golden Hurricane.

== Early life ==
He attended Culver City High School where he was a three-year letterman. He selected to the All-Ocean League first-team in his senior season in high school.

== College career ==
On December 4, 2012, he was named as an honorable mention for the C-USA All-Conference Team following his senior season.

== Professional career ==
=== San Francisco 49ers ===
On May 5, 2013, he signed with the San Francisco 49ers as an undrafted free agent. On July 23, 2013, he re-signed with the San Francisco 49ers after being released earlier in the offseason.

=== Spokane Shock ===
On December 17, 2013, Rose was assigned to the Spokane Shock of the Arena Football League (AFL). After taking parts of 2014 with 3 NFL teams, Rose was activated by the Shock from the Other League Exempt list on December 2, 2014.

=== New York Jets ===
Rose was signed by the New York Jets on January 9, 2014. He was released on July 23, 2014.

=== San Diego Chargers (first stint) ===
On August 1, 2014, Rose signed with the San Diego Chargers. The Chargers released Rose on August 25, 2014.

=== Miami Dolphins ===
Rose signed to the Dolphins practice squad after his Chargers release. On October 18, 2014, he was promoted to their 53-man roster. He played 13 snaps covering Broncos WR Demaryius Thomas in their Week 12 31-28 loss at Denver, limiting DeMaryius to 1 reception for 4 yards in Rose's coverage. He was waived on November 29, 2014, to make room for Don Jones. He was re-signed to the Dolphins practice squad after clearing waivers.

=== San Diego Chargers (second stint) ===
On June 1, 2015, Rose signed with the San Diego Chargers.

=== Los Angeles KISS ===
On October 16, 2015, Rose was assigned to the Los Angeles KISS.
