= Don Jones (safety) =

American football player (born 1990)

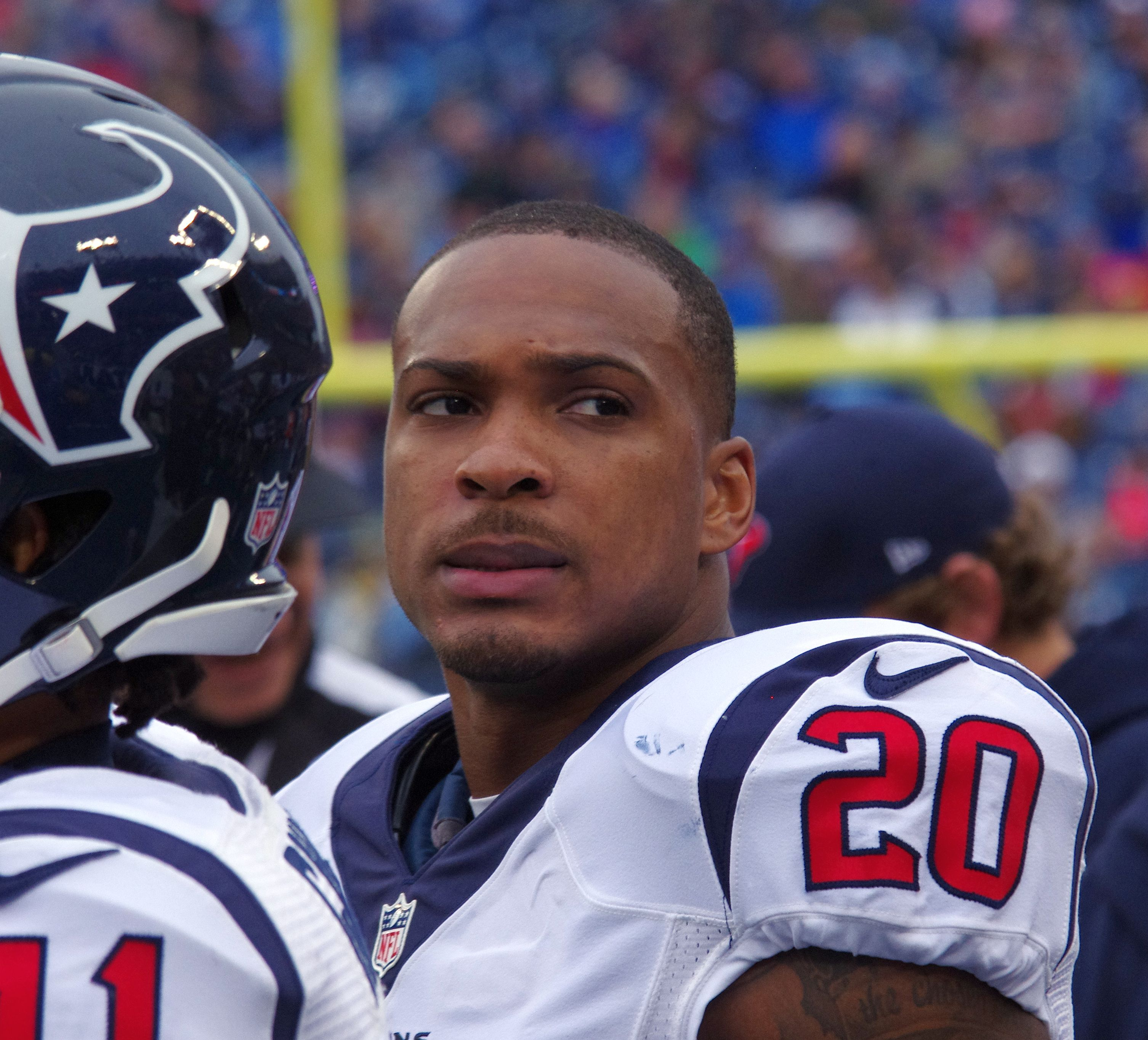
- Jones with the Houston Texans in Jan. 2017

No. 36, 29, 38, 30, 35, 20
- Position: Safety

Personal information
- Born: May 14, 1990 (age 36); Town Creek, Alabama, U.S.
- Listed height: 5 ft 11 in (1.80 m)
- Listed weight: 195 lb (88 kg)

Career information
- High school: Hazlewood (Town Creek, Alabama)
- College: Arkansas State
- NFL draft: 2013: 7th round, 250th overall pick

Career history
- Miami Dolphins (2013); New England Patriots (2014); Miami Dolphins (2014); New Orleans Saints (2015); Cleveland Browns (2015–2016); Houston Texans (2016); San Francisco 49ers (2017)

Awards and highlights
- PFWA All-Rookie Team (2013)

Career NFL statistics
- Total tackles: 40
- Forced fumbles: 1
- Stats at Pro Football Reference

Don Jones II (born May 14, 1990) is an American former professional football player who was a safety in the National Football League (NFL). He played college football for the Arkansas State Red Wolves.

== Early life ==
Jones played as a running back and defensive back for the Hazlewood Golden Bears in Town Creek, Alabama, where he was coached by Aaron Goode. He starred as a guard on the basketball team, coached by Shane Childress. As a senior, Jones won the Class 1A 100 meters, 200 meters and 400 meters in track. Jones ran for 1,869 yards and 22 touchdowns his senior year and had scholarship offers from 10 Division I schools. In July 2007, before his senior year, Jones was timed at 4.38 in a 40-yard dash at the Alabama-Birmingham football camp.

== College career ==
He played college football for the Arkansas State Red Wolves, where he started as a running back for head coach Steve Roberts. While with the Red Wolves, Jones rushed for 149 yards and two touchdowns on 24 attempts and had 12 catches for 146 yards and a score as a freshman in 2009.
He then transferred to Mississippi Gulf Coast Community College, where he played safety. He then returned to Arkansas State in 2011, where he moved to defensive back and linebacker.

== Professional career ==
=== Miami Dolphins (first stint) ===
Jones was selected in the seventh round (250th overall) by the Miami Dolphins. He received a 50.2 grade on his NFL.com draft profile.

Don Jones made a game-changing play for the Dolphins on September 22, 2013, against the Atlanta Falcons in the Dolphins' first home game of the season. Covering a punt on special teams, Jones forced a fumble when he hit punt returner Harry Douglas with 1:48 left in the third quarter. The Dolphins, trailing at the time 20-13, recovered the loose ball and scored a touchdown on the ensuing drive and went on to win 27-23. The victory improved the Dolphins' record to 3-0. He played on the special teams in all 16 regular-season games for the Dolphins, who finished 8-8 and missed the playoffs. On December 24, 2013, Jones was named to the Professional Football Writers Association (PFWA)'s All-Rookie Team as the kick gunner on special teams.

On Twitter, Jones wrote "Horrible" and "OMG" shortly after the drafting of Michael Sam by the St. Louis Rams and was promptly fined by the Dolphins and suspended from team activities. He was required to undergo educational training before he can return to the team. Jones was reinstated on May 19, 2014, after completing the training.

Jones was waived by the Dolphins on August 31, 2014.

=== New England Patriots ===
The New England Patriots claimed Jones off waivers on September 1, 2014. He was cut on Thanksgiving (November 27).

=== Miami Dolphins (second stint) ===
Jones signed with the Dolphins on November 28, 2014.

=== New Orleans Saints ===
Jones was signed to the New Orleans Saints practice squad on September 7, 2015, and was promoted to the active roster five days later. After appearing in five games on special teams, he was waived on October 13.

=== Cleveland Browns ===
Jones was claimed off waivers by the Cleveland Browns on October 14, 2015.

On March 17, 2016, Jones signed a one-year contract with the Cleveland Browns worth $1,671,000. He was released on October 4, 2016.

=== Houston Texans ===
On October 19, 2016, Jones was signed by the Houston Texans.

=== San Francisco 49ers ===
On March 10, 2017, Jones signed a two-year contract with the San Francisco 49ers. He was placed on injured reserve on September 2, 2017, after suffering an ACL injury. On July 25, 2018, Jones was waived by the 49ers.

== NFL career statistics ==
Legend
**Bold**	Career high

Year	Team	Games		Tackles				Interceptions						Fumbles			
Year	Team	GP	GS	Comb	Solo	Ast	Sack	PD	Int	Yds	Avg	Lng	TD	FF	FR	Yds	TD
2013	MIA	**16**	0	11	10	1	0.0	–	–	–	–	–	–	**1**	–	–	0
2014	NE	9	0	6	**6**	0	0.0	–	–	–	–	–	–	–	–	–	0
2014	MIA	4	0	5	**5**	0	0.0	–	–	–	–	–	–	–	–	–	0
2015	NO	5	0	1	1	0	0.0	–	–	–	–	–	–	–	–	–	0
2015	CLE	9	0	5	4	1	0.0	–	–	–	–	–	–	–	–	–	0
2016	CLE	4	0	**1**	0	**1**	0.0	–	–	–	–	–	–	–	–	–	0
2016	HOU	9	0	**11**	9	**2**	0.0	–	–	–	–	–	–	–	–	–	0
Source:		56	0	40	35	5	0.0	–	–	–	–	–	–	1	–	–	0

== Personal life ==
In April 2018, Jones returned to Lawrence County, Alabama, to escort a special needs student to her senior prom.
