= Emmanuel Dieke =

American gridiron football player (born 1990)

No. 66, 79, 98
- Position: Defensive end

Personal information
- Born: September 23, 1990 (age 36); Jackson, Mississippi, U.S.
- Listed height: 6 ft 6 in (1.98 m)
- Listed weight: 257 lb (117 kg)

Career information
- College: Georgia Tech
- NFL draft: 2014: undrafted

Career history
- New York Giants (2014)*; Miami Dolphins (2014–2015)*; Winnipeg Blue Bombers (2016)*
- * Offseason or practice squad member only
- Stats at Pro Football Reference

Emmanuel Dieke (born September 23, 1990) is an American former football defensive end. He was a member of the Miami Dolphins, New York Giants, and Winnipeg Blue Bombers. Dieke signed with the Blue Bombers on April 4, 2016.
