= Charlie Bullen =

American football coach (born 1984)

New York Giants
- Title: Outside linebackers coach/run game coordinator

Personal information
- Born: September 28, 1984 (age 42); Palatine, Illinois, U.S.

Career information
- Position: Quarterback
- High school: William Fremd (Palatine, Illinois)
- College: Harper (c. 2003); St. Norbert (c. 2005)

Career history
- Iowa City High School (2006) Volunteer assistant; Iowa (2007–2011); Student assistant (2007–2008); Graduate assistant (2009–2011); Miami Dolphins (2012–2018); Defensive assistant (2012); Assistant defensive line coach (2013–2015); Assistant linebackers coach (2016–2018); Arizona Cardinals (2019–2022); Assistant linebackers coach (2019); Outside linebackers coach (2020–2022); Illinois (2023) Outside linebackers coach & pass rush coordinator; New York Giants (2024–present); Outside linebackers coach (2024– 2025); Interim defensive coordinator (2025); Outside linebackers coach & Run-game coordinator(2026–present)
- Coaching profile at Pro Football Reference

Charles Raaen Bullen (born September 28, 1984) is an American professional football coach who is currently the outside linebackers coach for the New York Giants of the National Football League (NFL). He previously served as an assistant coach for the Iowa Hawkeyes, Miami Dolphins, Arizona Cardinals and Illinois Fighting Illini.

== Early life ==
Bullen is from Palatine, Illinois, and attended William Fremd High School, where he was teammates with future NFL quarterback Scott Tolzien. He then played college football as a quarterback at Harper College in Illinois and St. Norbert College in Wisconsin. Afterwards, he attended the University of Iowa, earning a bachelor's degree in finance in 2008 and a master's degree in sports management in 2011.

== Coaching career ==
=== 2006–2023 ===
Bullen's first coaching experience came in 2006, when he was a volunteer assistant coach working with quarterbacks at Iowa City High School. While attending the University of Iowa, he served as a student assistant from 2007 to 2008, working with the quarterbacks, and then was a graduate assistant from 2009 to 2011, working with defensive backs.

In 2012, Bullen entered the NFL, becoming a defensive assistant for the Miami Dolphins. He served in that role for one season before becoming assistant defensive line coach in 2013, later becoming assistant linebackers coach in 2016. He served as assistant linebackers coach through 2018. Bullen was named assistant linebackers coach for the Arizona Cardinals in 2019, then received a promotion to outside linebackers coach the following year. From 2020 to 2021, the Cardinals posted 89 sacks which was fifth-best in the NFL, with outside linebackers coached by Bullen recording 50 of those sacks. After three years as outside linebackers coach with the Cardinals, he was hired by Bret Bielema in 2023 as outside linebackers coach and pass rush coordinator for the Illinois Fighting Illini.

=== New York Giants ===
In 2024, Bullen joined the New York Giants as outside linebackers coach. On November 24, 2025, following the firing of Shane Bowen, Bullen was promoted to interim defensive coordinator.

Following the 2025 season, Bullen was retained by new head coach John Harbaugh as his outside linebackers coach. Bullen will add the Run-game coordinator under Harbaugh.
