= Walt Aikens =

American football player (born 1991)

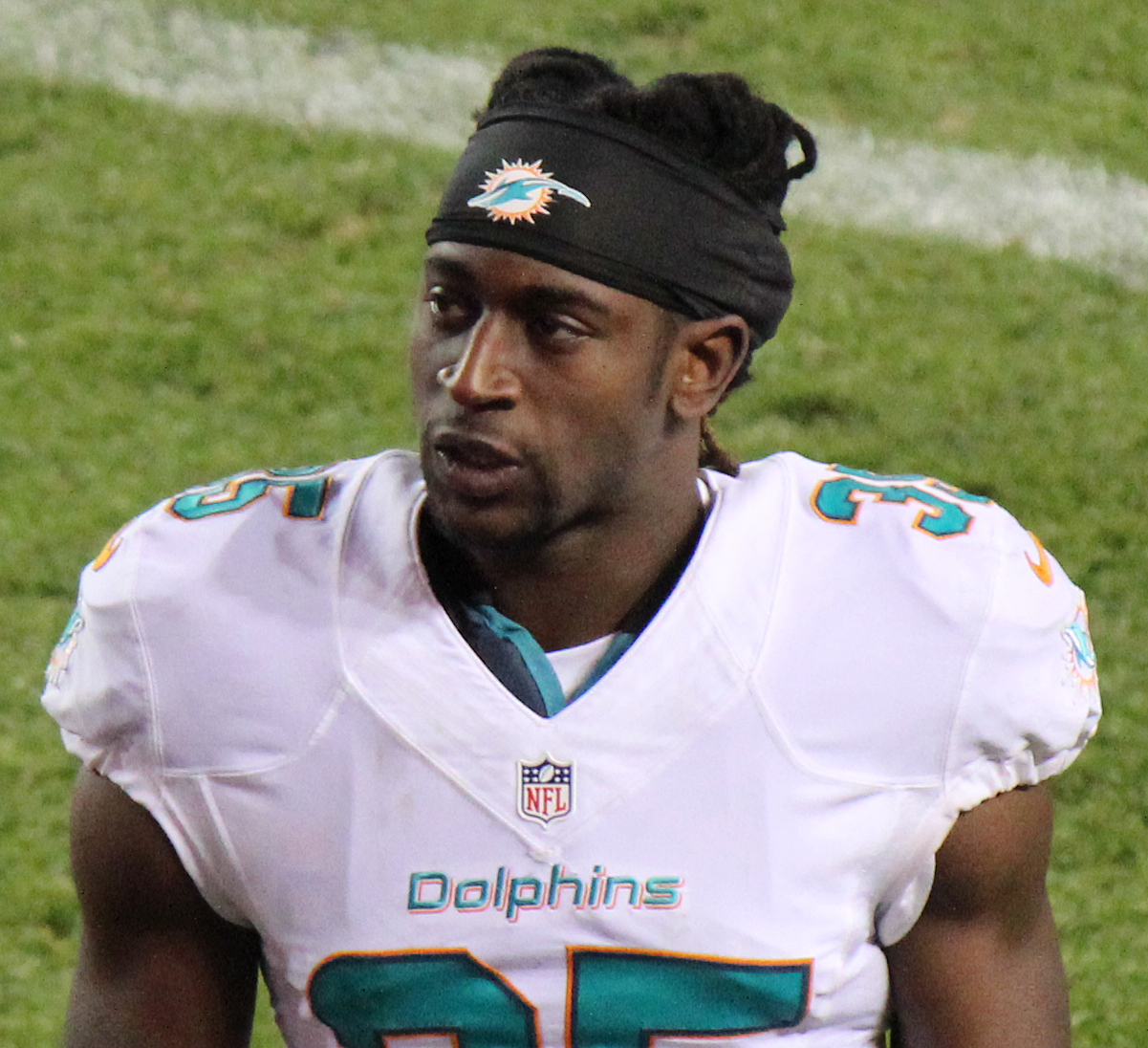
- Aikens with the Miami Dolphins in 2014

No. 35
- Position: Cornerback

Personal information
- Born: June 19, 1991 (age 35); Charlotte, North Carolina, U.S.
- Listed height: 6 ft 1 in (1.85 m)
- Listed weight: 200 lb (91 kg)

Career information
- High school: Harding University (Charlotte)
- College: Liberty
- NFL draft: 2014: 4th round, 125th overall pick

Career history
- Miami Dolphins (2014–2019)

Awards and highlights
- First-team All-Big South (2013); Second-team All-Big South (2011, 2012)

Career NFL statistics
- Total tackles: 92
- Forced fumbles: 2
- Pass deflections: 3
- Interceptions: 2
- Total touchdowns: 1
- Stats at Pro Football Reference

Walter Aikens Jr. (born June 19, 1991) is an American former professional football player who was a cornerback in the National Football League (NFL). He was selected by the Miami Dolphins in the fourth round of the 2014 NFL draft. He played college football for the Liberty Flames.

== Early life ==
Aikens attended Harding University High School in Charlotte, North Carolina. As a senior, he was named the All-Queen City Conference Offensive Player of the Year and earned first-team All-Mecklenburg County honors. Offensively, as a senior, he threw for 1,500 yards and 15 touchdowns and ran for 565 yards and five touchdowns, leading the team in both categories. Defensively, he recorded six interceptions, running back one 104 yards for a touchdown.

He was considered a two-star recruit by Rivals.com.

== College career ==
Aikens accepted a scholarship from the University of Illinois at Urbana–Champaign, where he played for the Illinois Fighting Illini football team in 2009. As a true freshman, he appeared in 10 games, including five starts at safety, recording with 32 tackles, (26 solo), and added two pass breakups, and was named to the Big Ten Conference All-Freshman Team.

On April 24, 2010, Aikens was arrested in connection with the theft of electronic items from a dormitory room on campus, as he was found in possession with the stolen property. The next day, he was suspended indefinitely from the team by coach Ron Zook.

Unable to be reinstated, Aikens transferred to Liberty University. After redshirting due to NCAA transfer rules, he started 11 games in 2011, recording 49 tackles, three interceptions and a Big South Conference leading 3 forced fumbles. He was named second-team all-conference. In 2012, he started 11 games, registering 51 tackles, one interception, six pass break-ups and three forced fumbles, and earned second-team all-conference honors. In 2013, he finished tied for first on the team with 62 tackles, three interceptions and six pass break-ups, and was named a first-team All-Big South selection.

== Professional career ==
Pre-draft measurables
Height	Weight	Arm length	Hand span	40-yard dash	10-yard split	20-yard split	20-yard shuttle	Three-cone drill	Vertical jump	Broad jump	Bench press
6 ft 0 5/8 in (1.84 m)	203 lb (92 kg)	32 1/4 in (0.82 m)	9 in (0.23 m)	4.49 s	1.59 s	2.66 s	4.42 s	7.12 s	35.0 in (0.89 m)	9 ft 10 in (3.00 m)	13 reps
All values from Pro Day

He was selected by the Miami Dolphins in the fourth round (125th overall) of the 2014 NFL draft. Aikens was the first Liberty Flames defensive back drafted since Donald Smith in 1990.

On May 26, 2014, the Dolphins signed Aikens to a four-year, $2.63 million contract that includes a signing bonus of $415,908.

In Week 4 of the 2014 season, Aikens recorded his first career interception in a 38–14 victory over the Oakland Raiders. During Week 15 of the 2016 season, Aikens recorded his first career touchdown after a blocked punt in a 34–13 victory over the New York Jets.

On March 13, 2018, Aikens signed a two-year contract extension with the Dolphins.

Although Aikens has had a limited role on the defense, he's been a large special teams contributor since the start of his career. He was named special teams captain by his teammates in September 2019.
