= Dennis Hickey (American football) =

American football coach, executive, and administrator

New York Giants
- Title: Senior Personnel Executive

Personal information
- Born: 1970 (age 55–56)

Career information
- Position: Safety
- College: Coffeyville, Tulsa

Career history

Coaching
- Blinn Junior (1994–1995) Defensive backs coach & recruiting coordinator

Operations
- Tampa Bay Buccaneers (1996–1997) Pro personnel assistant; Tampa Bay Buccaneers (1998–2003) College scout; Tampa Bay Buccaneers (2004–2010) Director of college scouting; Tampa Bay Buccaneers (2011–2013) Director of player personnel; Miami Dolphins (2014–2015) General manager; Buffalo Bills (2017–2021) Senior college scout; New York Giants (2022–present); Assistant director of player personnel (2022-2025); Senior personnel executive (2026-present)

Awards and highlights
- Super Bowl champion (XXXVII)
- Executive profile at Pro Football Reference

Dennis Hickey is the assistant director of player personnel for the New York Giants. He was previously a senior college scout for the Buffalo Bills & former general manager of the Miami Dolphins of the National Football League (NFL).

== Early life and early career ==
In 1990, Hickey failed to procure a football scholarship at the University of Tulsa. Hickey instead played football for Coffeyville Community College, where he led the team to a junior college football championship.

Eventually however, Hickey finally caught on with Tulsa, playing safety for the team for 3 seasons. In 1991 Tulsa finished the season 10–2.

== Professional Career ==
=== NFL career ===
Prior to being hired by Miami, Hickey worked in the Tampa Bay Buccaneers football operations group, serving in a number of personnel roles. He worked under general managers Rich McKay, Bruce Allen and Mark Dominik and alongside head coaches Tony Dungy, Jon Gruden, Raheem Morris and Greg Schiano.

On January 27, 2014, Hickey was hired by the Dolphins as their new GM. One of his first changes upon being hired by the Dolphins was the development of a football analytics department. He was fired on January 2, 2016.

On May 19, 2017, Hickey was hired by the Buffalo Bills as a senior college scout.

On May 9, 2022, it was announced Hickey was leaving the Bills to join the New York Giants as an assistant director of player personnel. He reunites with Joe Schoen, who worked with Hickey as a director of player personnel & assistant general manager in Miami & Buffalo, respectively. Hickey pseudo filled the role and acted as the Director of College Scouting. On May 16, 2026, Hickey was transitioned to Senior personnel executive, following the hire of John Ritcher.
