= Chris McCain =

American football player and mixed martial artist (born 1991)

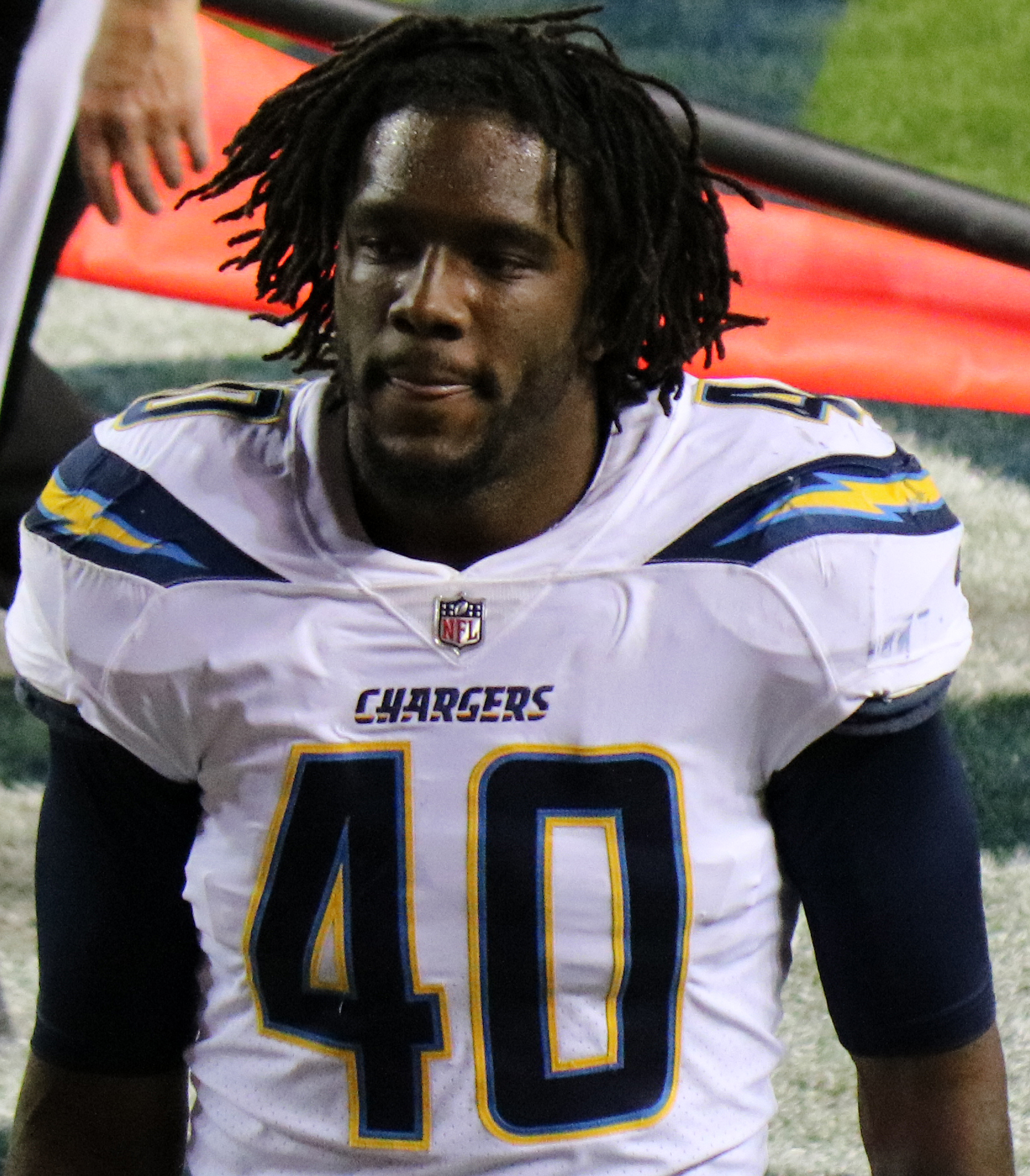
- McCain with the Los Angeles Chargers in 2017

Profile
- Position: Defensive end

Personal information
- Born: November 21, 1991 (age 34); Greensboro, North Carolina, U.S.
- Listed height: 6 ft 5 in (1.96 m)
- Listed weight: 248 lb (112 kg)

Career information
- High school: Northern Guilford (Greensboro)
- College: California (2010–2013)
- NFL draft: 2014: undrafted

Career history
- Miami Dolphins (2014–2015); New Orleans Saints (2016)*; Dallas Cowboys (2016)*; New Orleans Saints (2016); San Diego / Los Angeles Chargers (2016–2017); Indianapolis Colts (2018); Columbus Destroyers (2019)*
- * Offseason or practice squad member only

Career NFL statistics
- Total tackles: 28
- Sacks: 7.0
- Forced fumbles: 3
- Stats at Pro Football Reference

Christian Cornelius McCain (born November 21, 1991) is an American former professional football defensive end and mixed martial artist. He played college football for the California Golden Bears. He was signed by the Miami Dolphins as an undrafted free agent in 2014.

== Professional career ==
=== Miami Dolphins ===
McCain was signed by the Miami Dolphins after going undrafted in the 2014 NFL draft.

Due to a knee injury, he was placed on the team's injured reserve on December 22, 2015.

=== New Orleans Saints (first stint) ===
The Dolphins traded McCain to the New Orleans Saints for a conditional seventh round draft pick on August 29, 2016. On September 3, 2016, he was released by the Saints.

=== Dallas Cowboys ===
On September 7, 2016, McCain was signed to the Cowboys' practice squad. He was released on September 28.

=== New Orleans Saints (second stint) ===
On October 13, the Saints signed McCain to their practice squad. On October 22, McCain was promoted to the Saints active roster before their Week 7 game against the Kansas City Chiefs. He was released on October 25, 2016, and re-signed to the practice squad two days later. He was promoted back to the active roster on November 5, 2016, however was released two days later.

=== San Diego / Los Angeles Chargers ===
On November 23, 2016, McCain was signed to the Chargers' practice squad. He signed a reserve/future contract with the Chargers on January 3, 2017.

McCain made the Chargers final roster in 2017, playing in 15 games and finished third on the team with five sacks behind Joey Bosa and Melvin Ingram.

On March 14, 2018, set to be a restricted free agent, McCain received a right of first refusal tender by the Chargers. However, on April 15, 2018, the Chargers rescinded the tender on McCain, making him an unrestricted free agent.

=== Indianapolis Colts ===
On May 8, 2018, McCain signed with the Indianapolis Colts. He was placed on injured reserve on September 1, 2018. He was released on September 11, 2018.

=== Columbus Destroyers ===
On April 3, 2019, McCain was assigned to the Columbus Destroyers. He was placed on recallable reassignment on April 19, 2019.

== Mixed martial arts career ==
Chris McCain
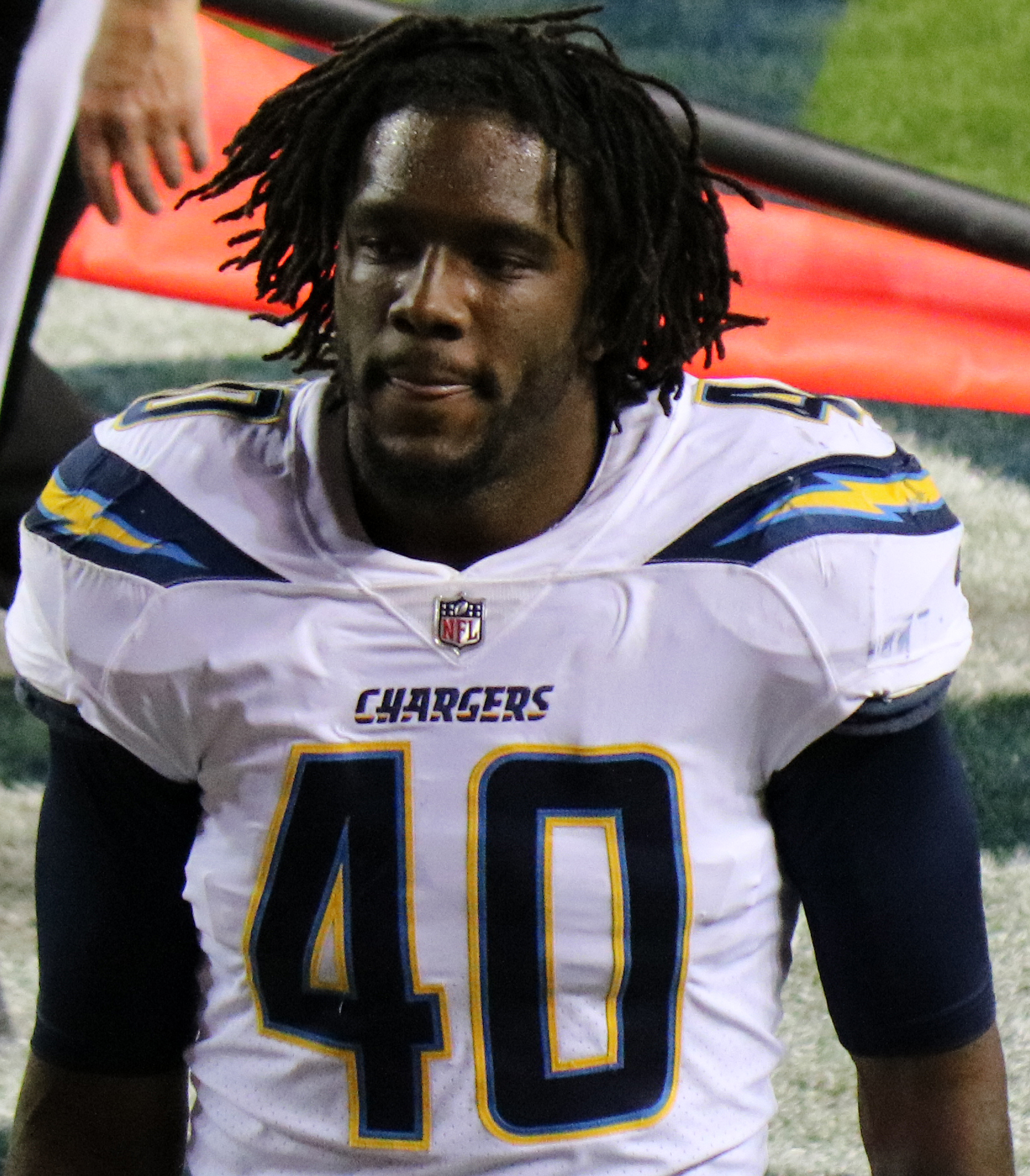
- Height: 6 ft 5 in (1.96 m)
- Weight: 228 lb (103 kg)
- Division: Heavyweight
- Team: BodyShop Fitness Team
- Years active: 2019–present

Amateur record
- Total: 3
- Wins: 3
- By knockout: 1
- By submission: 1
- By decision: 1

Other information
- Mixed martial arts record from Sherdog

McCain had been training mixed martial arts during the offseasons for the sake of conditioning but after his NFL career abruptly ended, he needed somewhere to go. He reached out to fellow NFL veteran Shawne Merriman – who had been trying to lure him to MMA for the previous couple of years – and subsequently signed a contract with Merriman's Lights Out Xtreme Fighting promotion. McCain immediately moved to California and begun training seriously at BodyShop MMA under Antonio McKee, making his amateur debut on July 6, 2019.

As of early 2020, McCain is 3–0 in amateur competition.

Amateur record breakdown		
3 matches	3 wins	0 losses
By knockout	1	0
By submission	1	0
By decision	1	0

Res.	Record	Opponent	Method	Event	Date	Round	Time	Location	Notes
Win	3–0	Anthony Taufi	Submission (guillotine choke)	Lights Out Xtreme Fighting 4	November 15, 2019	2	2:47	Burbank, California, United States	
Win	2–0	Matheus Moraes	Decision (unanimous)	Lights Out Xtreme Fighting 3	September 21, 2019	3	3:00	Commerce, California, United States	
Win	1–0	Jamal Harris	TKO (punches)	Lights Out Xtreme Fighting 2	July 6, 2019	2	0:38	Burbank, California, United States	

== Personal life ==
McCain has a daughter and a son from his previous relationships.
