= Marwan Maalouf =

Lebanese gridiron football player and coach (born 1976)

Denver Broncos
- Title: Assistant special teams coach

Personal information
- Born: November 26, 1976 (age 49); Beirut, Lebanon

Career information
- Position: Guard
- High school: Strongsville (Strongsville, Ohio)
- College: Baldwin–Wallace

Career history

Coaching
- Baldwin–Wallace (2000) Assistant offensive line coach; Fordham (2001) Assistant offensive line coach; Rutgers (2002–2003) Graduate assistant; Cleveland Browns (2005–2006) Special teams quality control coach; Baltimore Ravens (2008–2011) Assistant special teams coach; Indianapolis Colts (2012) Special teams coordinator; Miami Dolphins (2013–2018) Assistant special teams coach; Minnesota Vikings (2019–2020) Special teams coordinator; Miami (FL) (2022–2023) Special teams coach; New Orleans Saints (2024) Special teams coach; Denver Broncos (2025–present) Assistant special teams coach

Operations
- Cleveland Browns (2004) Scouting administrator

Marwan Maalouf (born November 26, 1976) is a Lebanese-American professional football coach who is the assistant special teams coach for the Denver Broncos of the National Football League (NFL). He has previously served as the special teams coordinator for the Indianapolis Colts and the Minnesota Vikings.

== Playing career ==
In college, Maalouf earned three letters while playing guard for Baldwin Wallace University from 1997 until 1999. He was a two-time All-Ohio Athletic Conference selection. In addition, he was named Baldwin-Wallace's Outstanding Offensive Lineman and was elected as a team captain for his senior season.

== Coaching career ==
=== Cleveland Browns ===
Maalouf began his professional football coaching career in 2005 as the special teams quality control coach for the Cleveland Browns. Following his three-year stint with Cleveland, he went on a brief hiatus, spending the duration of the 2007 season writing scouting reports for Scouts Inc. and ESPN.

=== Baltimore Ravens ===
In 2008, he returned to coaching on John Harbaugh’s initial staff, this time as the assistant special teams coach for the Baltimore Ravens.

=== Indianapolis Colts ===
Prior to the 2012 NFL season, he left the Ravens, following defensive coordinator Chuck Pagano who had been hired as the head coach of the Indianapolis Colts. The Colts soon named him their special teams coordinator. The Colts improved from 31st to 12th in Special Teams rankings under Maalouf. After the season, he was let go.

=== Miami Dolphins ===
In 2013, Maalouf was hired as the Miami Dolphins' assistant special teams coach under special teams coordinator Darren Rizzi.

=== Minnesota Vikings ===
In 2019, After spending six seasons as the Dolphins' assistant special teams coach, Maalouf was hired as the Minnesota Vikings' special teams coordinator. Upon the conclusion of the 2020 season, the Vikings and Maalouf elected to mutually part ways. The Vikings promoted their assistant special teams coach, Ryan Ficken.

=== Miami ===
From 2022 to 2023, Maalouf served as a special teams coach for the Miami Hurricanes. His Kickoff Return units and Punt Team were in the top 10 in the country. Maalouf developed Andres Borregales (Kicker, New England Patriots) and Lou Hedley (Punter, New Orleans Saints).

=== New Orleans Saints ===
In 2024, Maalouf was hired as a special teams coach for the New Orleans Saints, when Darren Rizzi was named the Interim Head Coach.

=== Denver Broncos ===
In February 2025, Maalouf joined Rizzi, who had recently been named the Denver Broncos' new special teams coordinator shortly after the firing of Ben Kotwica. Maalouf was named assistant special teams coach, which had been left vacant after previous assistant Chris Banjo was hired as special teams coordinator of the New York Jets.
