= Terrence Fede =

American football player (born 1991)

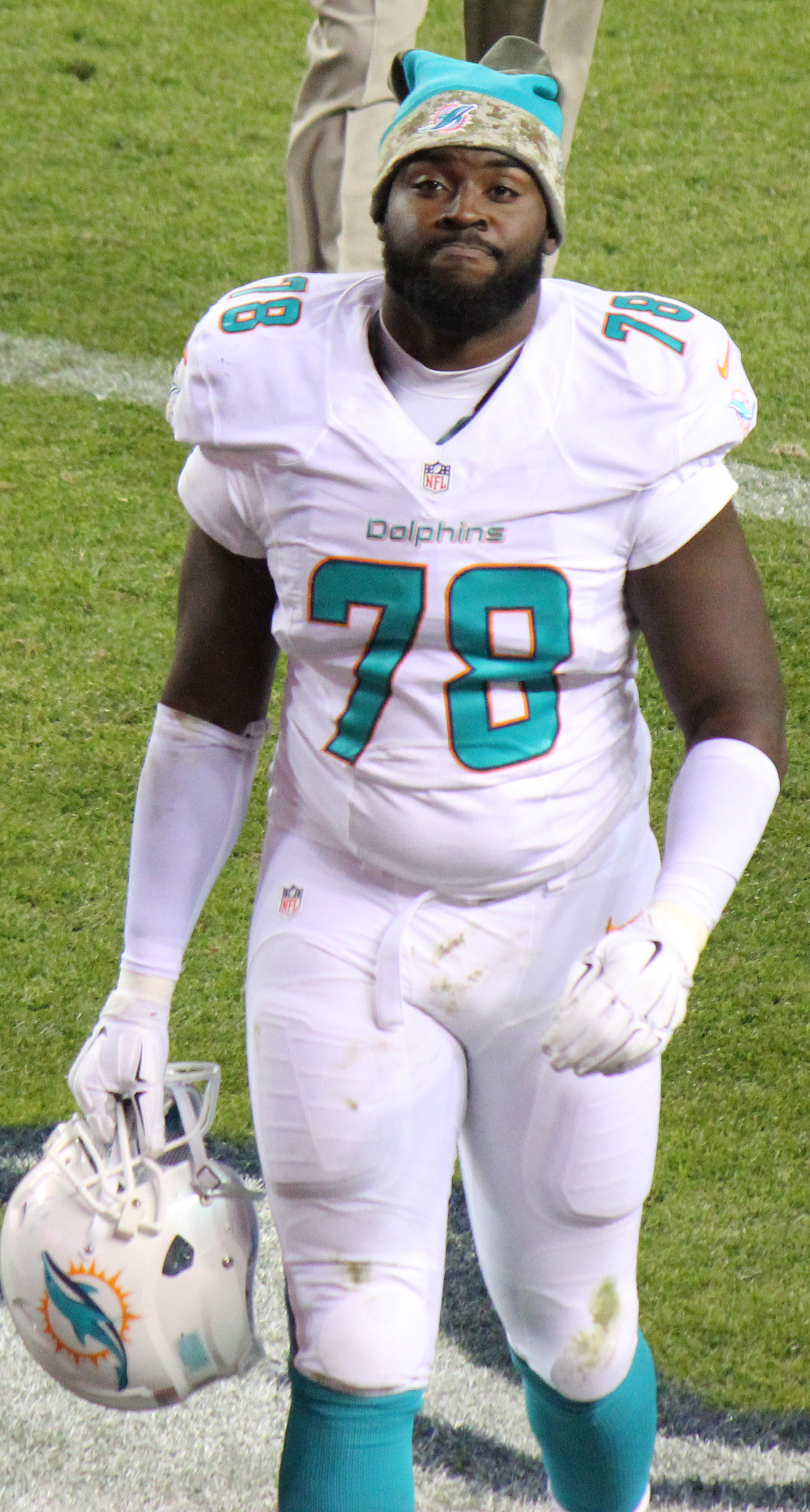
- Fede with the Miami Dolphins in 2014

No. 78
- Position: Defensive end

Personal information
- Born: November 19, 1991 (age 34); Nyack, New York, U.S.
- Listed height: 6 ft 4 in (1.93 m)
- Listed weight: 267 lb (121 kg)

Career information
- High school: Nyack
- College: Marist
- NFL draft: 2014: 7th round, 234th overall pick

Career history
- Miami Dolphins (2014–2017); Buffalo Bills (2018)*; New York Giants (2019)*
- * Offseason or practice squad member only

Career NFL statistics
- Total tackles: 55
- Sacks: 1
- Fumble recoveries: 2
- Stats at Pro Football Reference

Terrence Fede (born November 19, 1991) is an American former professional football player who was a defensive end in the National Football League (NFL). He was selected by the Miami Dolphins in the seventh round of the 2014 NFL draft. He played college football for the Marist Red Foxes.

== Early life ==
Fede was born to Haitian parents in Nyack, New York. Fede attended Nyack High School in Upper Nyack, New York, where he was a dual athlete playing football and basketball.

== College career ==
Fede totaled 13 sacks his senior season, and 31 for his college career.

== Professional career ==
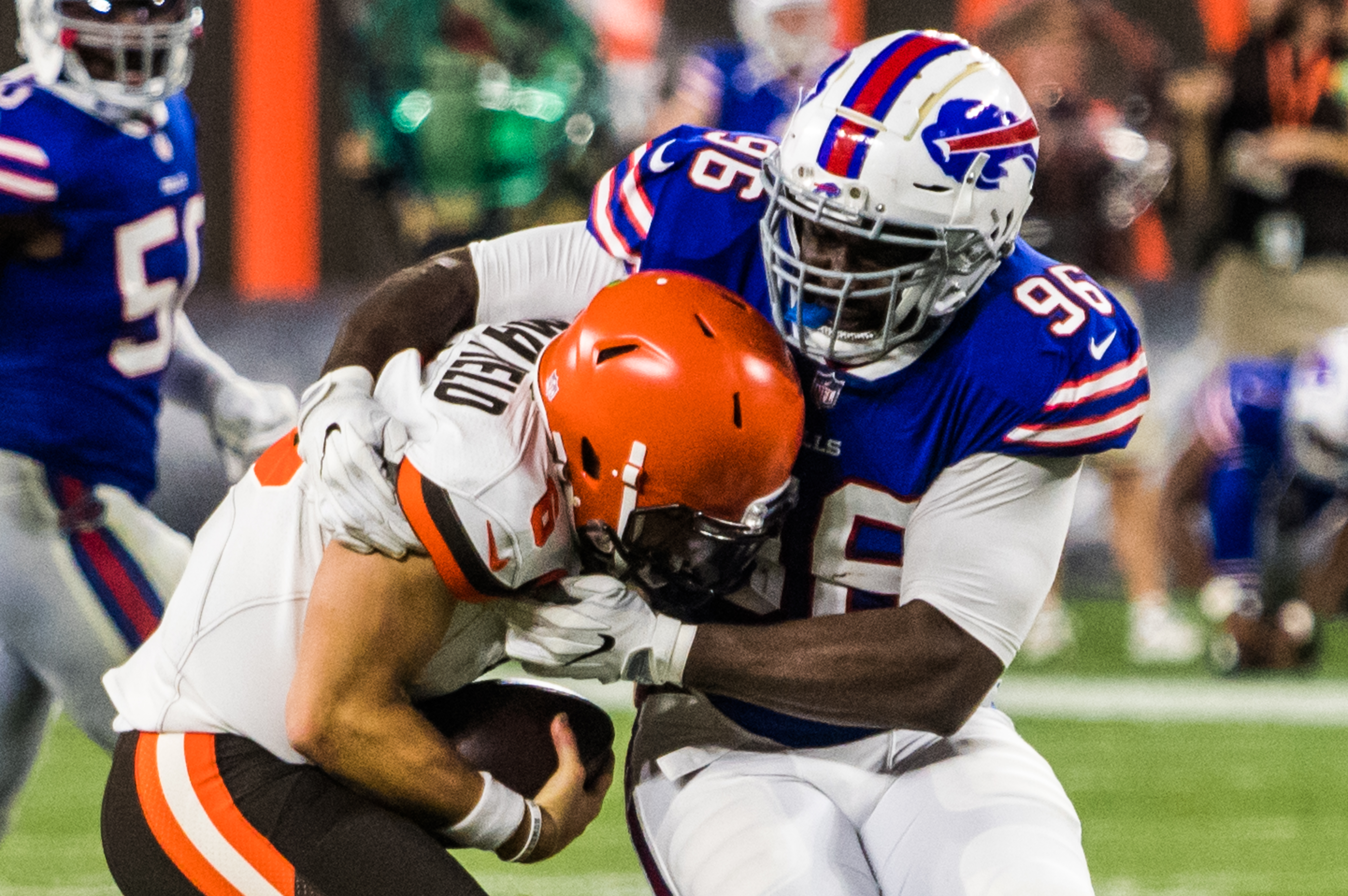
Fede sacks Baker Mayfield during 2018 preseason with the Bills.

=== Miami Dolphins ===
Fede was selected by the Miami Dolphins in the seventh round, 234th overall, in the 2014 NFL draft. He was the first ever player from Marist College to be drafted. On December 21, Fede blocked a punt for a safety with 41 seconds left to break a tie and give the Dolphins a 37-35 victory over the Minnesota Vikings. It was the latest point in a game in NFL history that a safety proved to be the winning margin. Fede was an occasional starter during his tenure with Miami.

On October 28, 2016, Fede, along with Senior Vice Presidents Nat Moore and Jason Jenkins and Dolphins staff flew to Port-au-Prince, Haiti to deliver medical supplies, safe water solutions and generators to help rebuild homes. The visit was arranged in conjunction with the City of North Miami and the North Miami Police Department.

=== Buffalo Bills ===
On April 4, 2018, Fede signed with the Buffalo Bills. He was released by the Bills on September 1.

=== New York Giants ===
On August 3, 2019, Fede was signed by the New York Giants. He was waived by the Giants on August 31, as part of final roster cuts.

== Personal life ==
Fede's cousin, Audric Estimé, is a running back who plays for the New Orleans Saints. Fede's parents raised Estimé and his brother after their mother died of sickle cell disease when Estimé was ten years old.
