= Gus Martin =

Gus Martin may refer to:

- Augustine Martin, Irish academic
- C. Augustus Martin, author on terrorism
