= Painting Pictures (disambiguation) =

Painting Pictures is the 2017 debut album by Kodak Black.

Painting Pictures may also refer to:

- "Painting Pictures", a song by Adele from the album 19, 2008
- "Painting Pictures", a song by Polo G from the album Hall of Fame, 2021
- "Painting Pictures" (song), a 2022 song by Superstar Pride
