= Jonathan Martin (American football) =

American football player (born 1989)

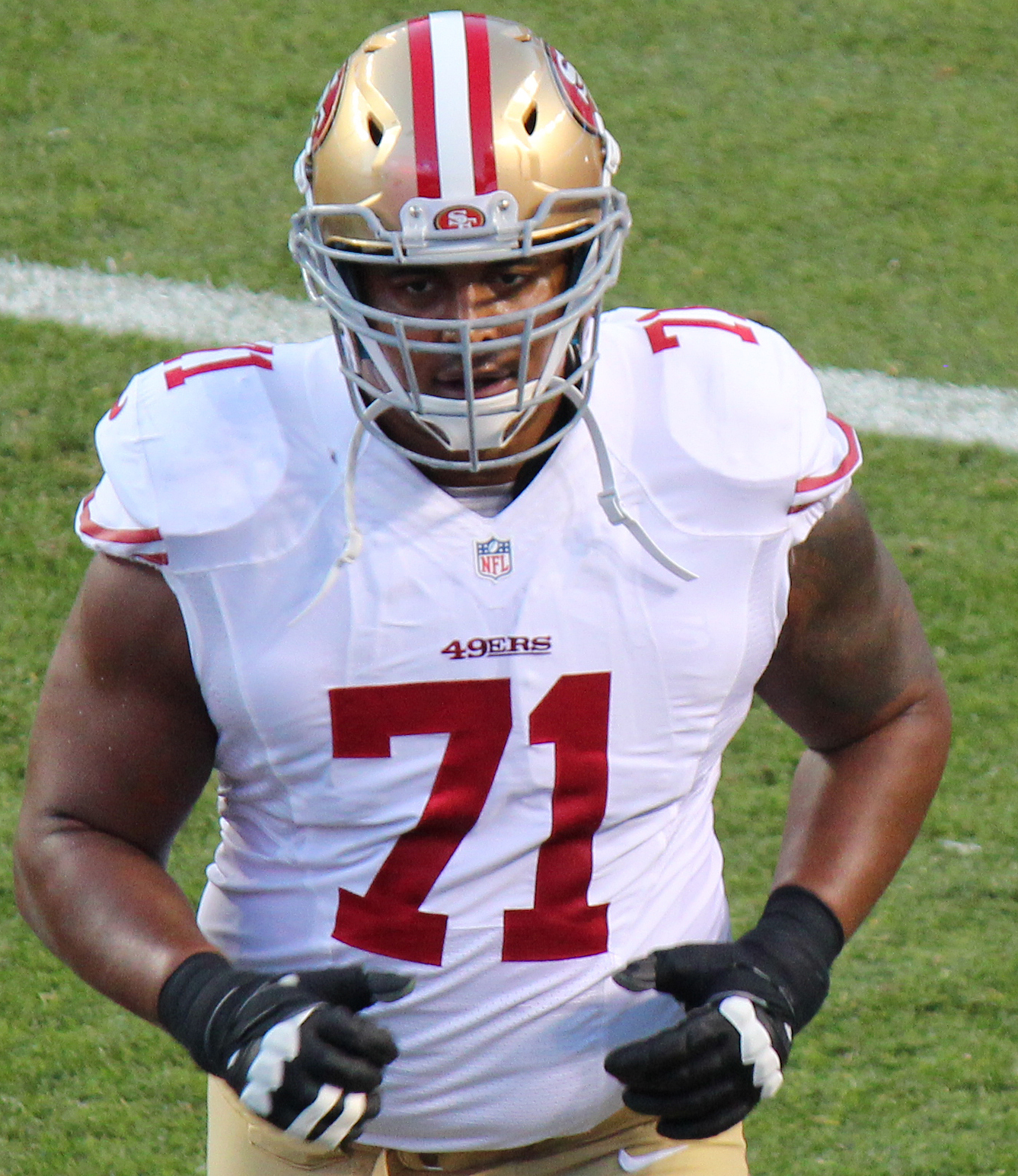
- Martin with the San Francisco 49ers in 2014

No. 71
- Position: Offensive tackle

Personal information
- Born: August 19, 1989 (age 37); Pittsburgh, Pennsylvania, U.S.
- Listed height: 6 ft 5 in (1.96 m)
- Listed weight: 315 lb (143 kg)

Career information
- High school: Harvard-Westlake School (Los Angeles, California)
- College: Stanford (2008–2011)
- NFL draft: 2012: 2nd round, 42nd overall pick

Career history
- Miami Dolphins (2012–2013); San Francisco 49ers (2014); Carolina Panthers (2015)*
- * Offseason or practice squad member only

Awards and highlights
- 2× All-American (2010, 2011); 2× First-team All-Pac-12 (2010, 2011)

Career NFL statistics
- Games played: 38
- Games started: 32
- Stats at Pro Football Reference

Jonathan Augustus Martin (born August 19, 1989) is an American former professional football player who was an offensive tackle in the National Football League (NFL). He played college football for the Stanford Cardinal. Martin was selected by the Miami Dolphins in the second round of the 2012 NFL draft. He also played for the San Francisco 49ers.

== Early life ==
Martin's father, Gus Martin, is a Harvard University graduate and a professor of criminal justice administration at California State University, Dominguez Hills. His mother, Jane Howard-Martin, is also a Harvard graduate and is a corporate lawyer for Toyota. Martin has a total of nine relatives who graduated from Harvard including his grandfather, a professor in international development, and his maternal great grandfather, one of a dozen black students there in the 1920s.

Martin attended John Thomas Dye School in the Los Angeles area and for high school, he attended nationally ranked Harvard-Westlake School in Los Angeles, California. He was an all-section and All-Mission League selection as a senior in 2007 and earned All-Mission League honors as a junior in 2006.

Regarded as a three-star recruit by Rivals.com, Martin was ranked as the No. 44 offensive tackle prospect in the class of 2008, which was highlighted by Mike Adams and Matt Kalil. Martin originally committed to play for the UCLA Bruins. However, after getting cleared academically by Stanford University, he de-committed from UCLA and committed to the Cardinal on January 11, 2008.

== College career ==
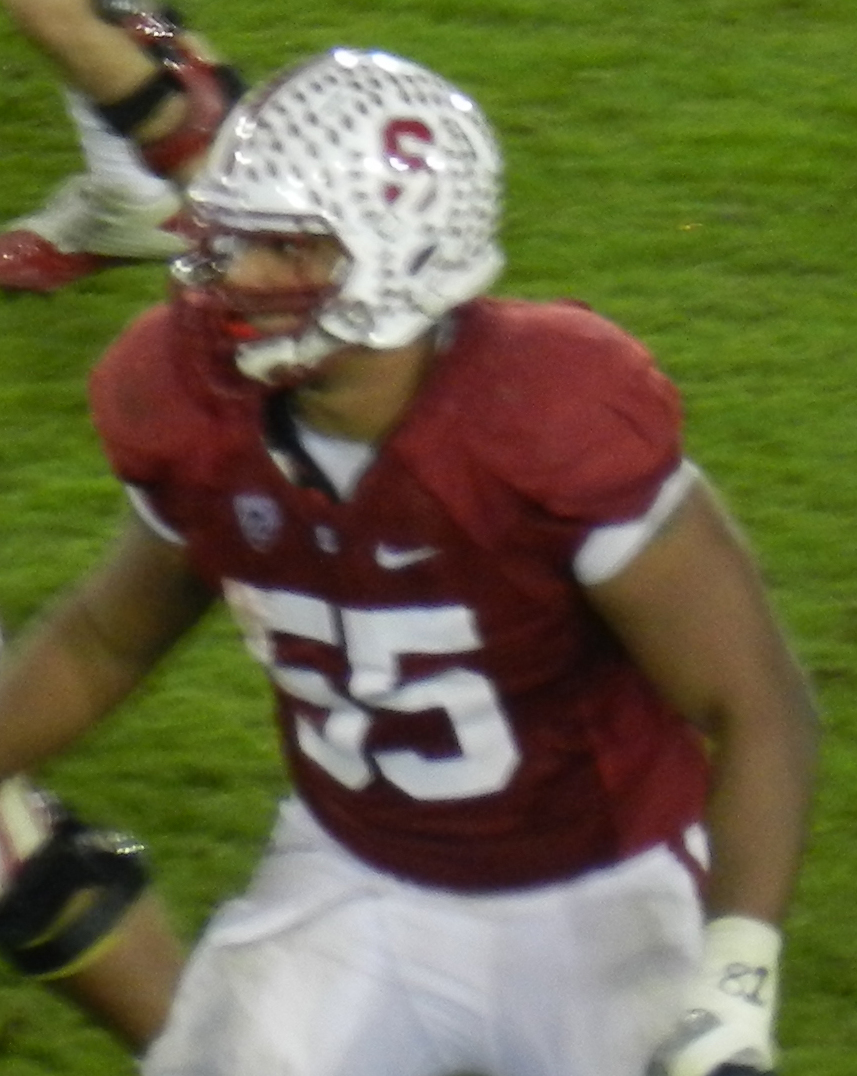
Martin as a Stanford Cardinal, 2011.

At Stanford University, Martin majored in classics. As a redshirt freshman in 2009, Martin started 11 of 13 games at left tackle. He was one of two freshman starters on the offensive line, along with left guard David DeCastro. Despite its inexperience, the Cardinal offensive line allowed a Pac-10-low seven sacks on the year, enabling Stanford's freshman quarterback Andrew Luck to lead the conference in passing efficiency at 143.47. On the ground, Cardinal running back Toby Gerhart rushed for a school-record 1,871 yards and 28 touchdowns in 2009. Martin was an honorable mention All-Pac-10 selection and a second-team freshman All-American by CollegeFootballNews.com.

In his sophomore year, Martin started all games at left tackle and was named a first-team All-American by Scout.com. Fellow linemen DeCastro and center Chase Beeler also received All-America recognition, as the Cardinal offensive line allowed just six sacks on the season, the second fewest in the FBS behind only Air Force. Quarterback Andrew Luck led the Pac-10 in passing efficiency for the second year in a row.

With Jonathan Martin anchoring the left tackle position, the 2010 Stanford Cardinal Football Team ended the regular season 11-1 and defeated Virginia Tech 40–12 in the Orange Bowl for the first BCS bowl victory in program history.

As a junior, Martin again started all games and earned All-America honors by Scout.com and the Walter Camp Foundation.

== Professional career ==
=== Pre-draft ===
On January 3, 2012, Martin announced he was declaring for the 2012 NFL draft. He was regarded as the No. 3 tackle prospect in the 2012 NFL draft, behind Matt Kalil and Riley Reiff. He was projected to be a late-first or early-second round selection.

Pre-draft measurables
Height	Weight	Arm length	Hand span	Wingspan	40-yard dash	10-yard split	20-yard split	20-yard shuttle	Three-cone drill	Vertical jump	Broad jump	Bench press
6 ft 5 3/8 in (1.97 m)	312 lb (142 kg)	34 in (0.86 m)	9 7/8 in (0.25 m)	6 ft 10 1/8 in (2.09 m)	5.27 s	1.78 s	3.03 s	4.68 s	7.69 s	30.0 in (0.76 m)	8 ft 8 in (2.64 m)	20 reps
All values from NFL Combine/Stanford Pro Day

=== Miami Dolphins ===
At the 2012 NFL draft, Martin was selected in round 2, with the 42nd overall pick by the Miami Dolphins. Despite playing mostly at left tackle in college, the Dolphins drafted him to play at right tackle.

During his rookie season, Martin started at right tackle from the beginning of training camp and struggled early in preseason with giving up sacks and penalties. On October 2, 2012, Martin was fined $10,000 for illegal clipping, a standard fine imposed on a player for the common foul of blocking an opponent from behind and below the waist. In December 2012, Martin was moved over to left tackle to take over for Pro Bowler Jake Long, who had been placed on injured reserve with a torn triceps. Martin had started the first 12 games of the season at right tackle, ranking 63rd out of the 69 NFL tackles who had played at least 300 snaps, according to Pro Football Focus’ grading system.

For the 2013 season, Martin was slotted at left tackle in order to replace Long, who had left in free agency, and was noted to struggle throughout the early part of the season in pass protection. On October 21, 2013, the Dolphins signed Bryant McKinnie to take over at left tackle, moving Martin back over to right tackle. The Miami Herald reported that the Dolphins were concerned about moving Martin due to the impact on him. Writing for the Herald, Armando Salguero reported "It was clear Martin isn't thrilled about the move. 'You can approach this two different ways,' Martin said. 'You can go in the tank and be one of those guys who bitches and moans and is a cancer in the locker room, or you can be a guy who goes out there and can be a professional and plays as hard as I can.' Martin stated he'll be the latter."

==== Bullying scandal ====
On October 30, 2013, it was reported that Martin had left team facilities two days earlier, citing "emotional" reasons. It was initially reported that he had been mistreated by some teammates during lunch that day when they asked him to sit with them, but then promptly got up and left the table when he sat down. Martin was subsequently listed on the injury report with an unspecified injury and missed the Dolphins' game on October 31. It was later reported that during this period Martin had briefly checked into a hospital for emotional distress before flying to his parents' home in California, where he is "preparing a detailed document for his cooperation with a league investigation into a string of alleged multiple incidents he says led to his emotional distress and exit from the team".

On November 2, it was reported that Richie Incognito's ring-leading role in the harassment of Martin dating as far back as the 2012 season was being reviewed by the NFL Players Association. On November 3, Incognito was suspended by the Dolphins for "conduct detrimental to the team." The next day, it was reported that Incognito had sent numerous texts and voicemails making threats against Martin and Martin's family.

According to ESPN's Adam Schefter, the most egregious of these exchanges was a highly graphic voicemail Incognito left in April 2013, in which Incognito called Martin a "half-nigger piece of shit," threatened to slap Martin's mother across the face and even uttered a death threat against Martin. Until obtaining the tape from Martin's legal team, the Dolphins had publicly maintained the charges against Incognito were pure speculation. Schefter said that as late as the afternoon of November 3, the Dolphins didn't even know the voicemail existed. However, within hours of hearing the tape, Incognito had been suspended. On November 5, the Sun-Sentinel reported that the message that ultimately led to Incognito's suspension was made after Martin missed two days of the team's voluntary workout program. The coaches asked Incognito to help "toughen up" Martin and "get him into the fold".

On November 11, a source close to Martin told ESPN's Lisa Salters that Martin was not willing to play for the Dolphins again, and planned to sit out the remainder of the 2013 season, which he did. In February 2014, a 144-page report by Ted Wells—an attorney hired by the NFL to investigate the scandal—found that Incognito and fellow linemen John Jerry and Mike Pouncey "engaged in a pattern of harassment" toward Martin, another offensive lineman, and an assistant trainer.

In February 2025, Martin did a lengthy ESPN article where he reframed how he viewed his treatment by teammates in Miami, and highlighted how it was his mother that first used the word bullying. The article included a transcript of the voicemail that Incognito left Martin, with derogatory and racist comments. Incognito and others quickly pointed to pulled quotes from the article, lambasting ESPN and other journalists for what he viewed as evidence of his vindication. Mike Florio of ProFootballTalk defended his original reporting, highlighting the nuance of the situation and the original findings by Ted Wells that Incognito and others behaved inappropriately, even within the context of an NFL locker room.

=== San Francisco 49ers ===
On March 11, 2014, it was reported that the Dolphins had agreed to trade Martin to the San Francisco 49ers in exchange for a conditional draft pick. Under the conditions of the deal, the Dolphins would receive a 2015 seventh round draft pick if Martin was on the 49ers' opening 53-man roster. With right tackle Anthony Davis out due to injury, Martin started the first game of the 2014 season with the 49ers against the Cowboys. On March 26, 2015, Martin was waived by the 49ers.

=== Carolina Panthers ===
On March 27, 2015, the Carolina Panthers claimed Martin off waivers.

== Retirement and later life ==
Martin retired from the NFL on July 27, 2015, citing a back injury that would have made him miss the entire 2015 season. One month later, he posted a message to Facebook describing mental health struggles and suicide attempts as among additional factors in his decision to leave the sport.

Soon after retiring, Martin returned to Stanford to complete his degree and spent several months as a national spokesperson for Beyond Differences, a group focused on creating a more inclusive community and combatting bullying in middle and high schools in the Bay Area.

On February 23, 2018, Martin was taken into police custody following a post to his Instagram account with an image of a shotgun and a caption that read: "When you're a bully victim & a coward, your options are suicide, or revenge." Following the post, which also mentioned his former high school, Harvard-Westlake School, the school shut down for the day. Martin voluntarily checked himself into a mental hospital soon after posting the picture, where he was later questioned by LAPD detectives.

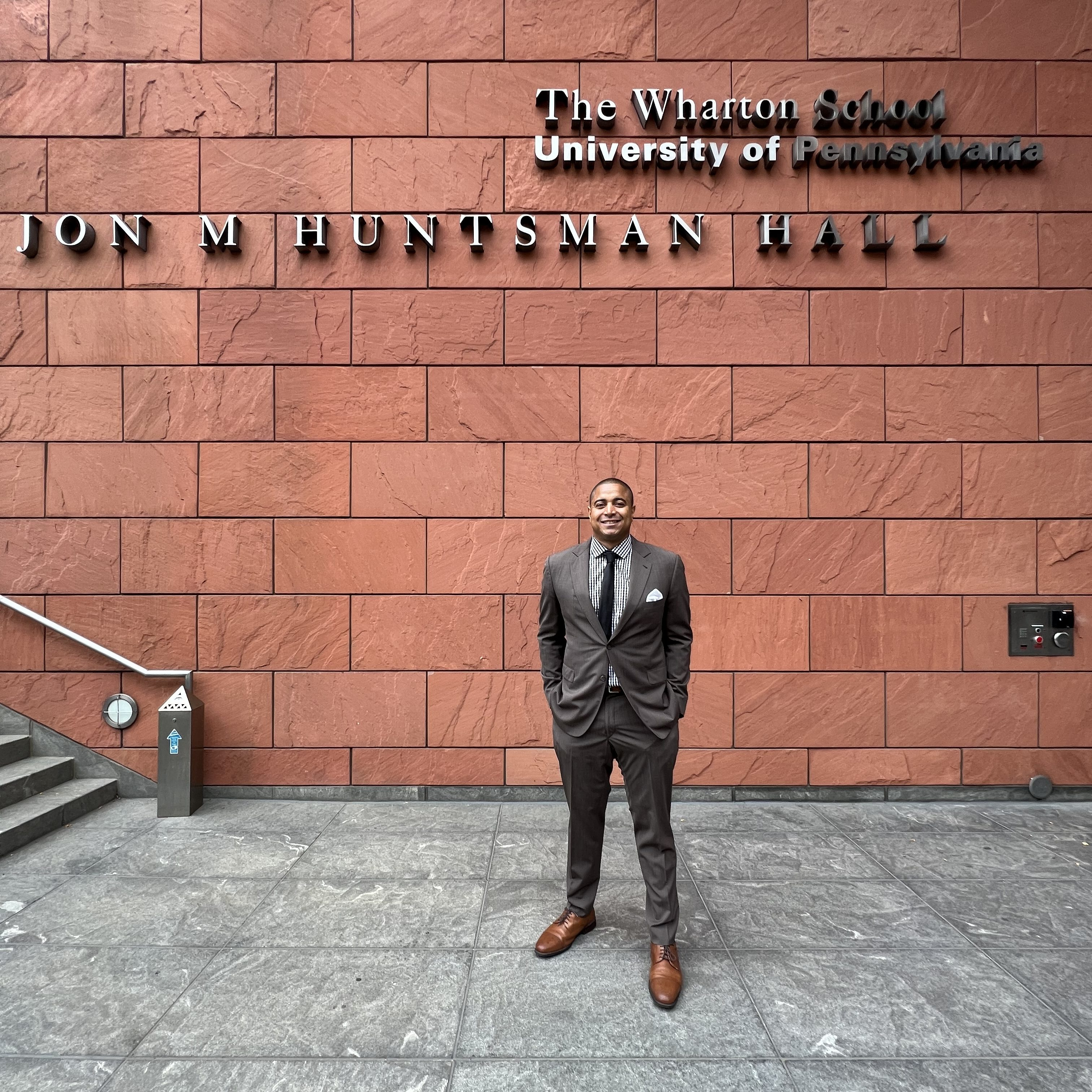
Martin in front of Jon M. Huntsman Hall at The Wharton School

In October 2019, Martin entered into a diversion program while receiving praise from Los Angeles Superior Court Judge Richard Kirschner, who stated he “independently made efforts to address his issues and did frankly an excellent job in bringing himself to a state of stability and good mental health.” In October 2021, Martin completed the diversion program, and all criminal charges were dismissed. He will have no criminal record.

In 2019, Jonathan Martin co-founded Treehorn Properties, a wholesaling real estate platform focused on distressed properties in Central Texas. In 2020, Martin joined the Narrow Road Group, a real estate owner, operator, and developer platform, as an early partner. The same year, he also enrolled into a Masters in Finance and Real Estate program at Georgetown University, graduating with a 3.8 GPA in December 2022.

In August 2022, Martin enrolled at The Wharton School to pursue an MBA.
