= Batesville, Mississippi =

- City
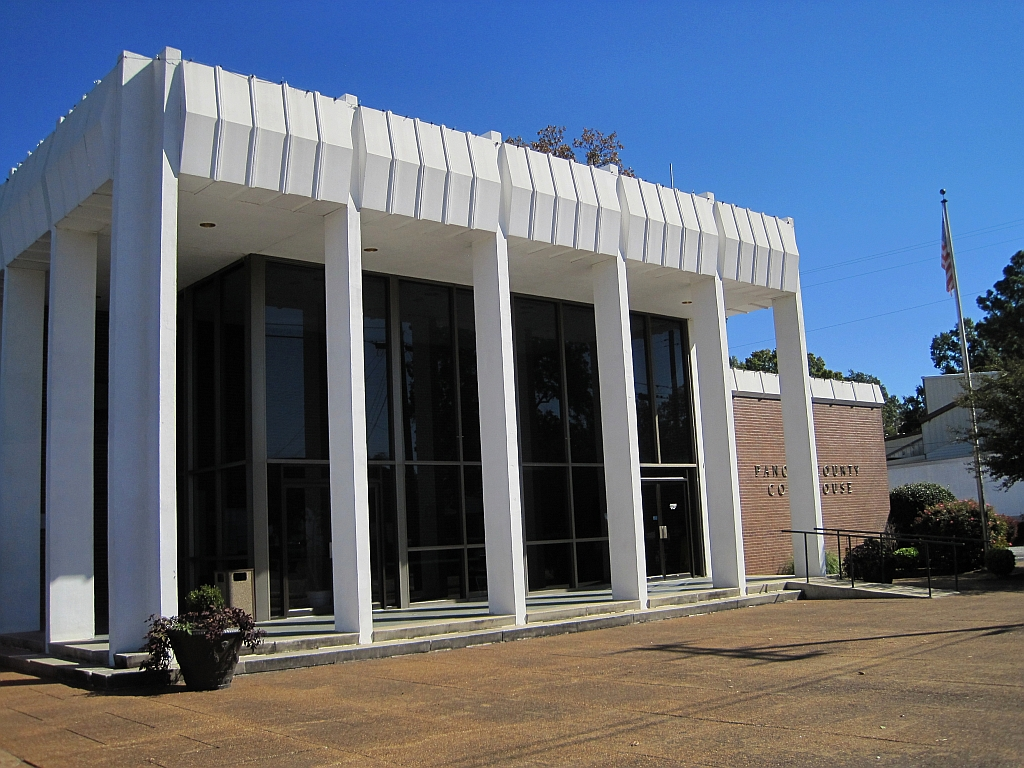
- Panola County Courthouse in Batesville

- Flag Seal

- Location of Batesville, Mississippi

- Location in Mississippi Batesville (the United States) Batesville (North America)
- Coordinates: 34°18′53″N 89°55′30″W
- Country: United States
- State: Mississippi
- County: Panola

Government
  - Type: Mayor-Aldermen
  - Mayor: Hal Ferrell (I)

Area
  - Total: 19.95 sq mi (51.67 km^{2})
  - Land: 19.95 sq mi (51.67 km^{2})
  - Water: 0 sq mi (0.00 km^{2})
- Elevation: 289 ft (88 m)

Population (2020)
  - Total: 7,523
  - Density: 377.1/sq mi (145.59/km^{2})
- Time zone: UTC-6 (Central (CST))
  - Summer (DST): UTC-5 (CDT)
- ZIP code: 38606
- Area code: 662
- FIPS code: 28-03620
- GNIS feature ID: 2403820
- Website: batesville.ms

Batesville is a city in Panola County, Mississippi, United States. The population was 7,523 at the 2020 census, up from 7,463 at the 2010 census.

Batesville is one of two county seats which the legislature established for Panola County, related to a longstanding rivalry between towns on either side of the Tallahatchie River; the other is Sardis, located north of the river.

== History ==
Batesville was founded in the 1850s following the construction of the Mississippi and Tennessee Railroad.

== Geography ==
According to the United States Census Bureau, the city has a total area of 11.1 square miles (29 km^{2}), all land.

== Demographics ==
Historical population
Census	Pop.	Note	%±
1870	227		—
1880	442		94.7%
1890	705		59.5%
1900	556		−21.1%
1910	774		39.2%
1920	1,050		35.7%
1930	1,062		1.1%
1940	1,815		70.9%
1950	2,463		35.7%
1960	3,284		33.3%
1970	3,796		15.6%
1980	5,162		36.0%
1990	6,403		24.0%
2000	7,113		11.1%
2010	7,463		4.9%
2020	7,523		0.8%
U.S. Decennial Census

=== 2020 census ===
As of the 2020 census, Batesville had a population of 7,523. The median age was 36.4 years. 26.5% of residents were under the age of 18 and 16.9% of residents were 65 years of age or older. For every 100 females there were 84.4 males, and for every 100 females age 18 and over there were 77.1 males age 18 and over.

83.4% of residents lived in urban areas, while 16.6% lived in rural areas.

There were 2,797 households in Batesville, of which 36.0% had children under the age of 18 living in them. Of all households, 37.9% were married-couple households, 15.6% were households with a male householder and no spouse or partner present, and 39.9% were households with a female householder and no spouse or partner present. About 29.8% of all households were made up of individuals and 13.7% had someone living alone who was 65 years of age or older. There were also 2,494 families residing in the city.

There were 3,089 housing units, of which 9.5% were vacant. The homeowner vacancy rate was 1.4% and the rental vacancy rate was 13.0%.

Batesville Racial Composition
Race	Num.	Perc.
White	3,405	45.26%
Black or African American	3,725	49.51%
Native American	3	0.04%
Asian	43	0.57%
Other/Mixed	135	1.79%
Hispanic or Latino	212	2.82%

=== 2000 census ===
As of the census of 2000, there were 7,113 people, 2,577 households, and 1,821 families residing in the city. The population density was 638.2 inhabitants per square mile (246.4/km^{2}). There were 2,791 housing units at an average density of 250.4 per square mile (96.7/km^{2}). The racial makeup of the city was 56.43% White, 41.88% African American, 0.06% Native American, 0.38% Asian, 0.04% Pacific Islander, 0.82% from other races, and 0.39% from two or more races. Hispanic or Latino of any race were 1.60% of the population.

There were 2,577 households, out of which 35.7% had children under the age of 18 living with them, 44.7% were married couples living together, 21.5% had a female householder with no husband present, and 29.3% were non-families. 26.2% of all households were made up of individuals, and 12.6% had someone living alone who was 65 years of age or older. The average household size was 2.59 and the average family size was 3.14.

In the city, the population was spread out, with 28.9% under the age of 18, 11.6% from 18 to 24, 26.4% from 25 to 44, 18.6% from 45 to 64, and 14.4% who were 65 years of age or older. The median age was 33 years. For every 100 females, there were 85.9 males. For every 100 females age 18 and over, there were 78.4 males. The median income for a household in the city was $29,875, and the median income for a family was $38,849. Males had a median income of $30,998 versus $22,029 for females. The per capita income for the city was $15,814. About 21.9% of families and 28.7% of the population were below the poverty line, including 36.1% of those under age 18 and 27.0% of those age 65 or over.

== Education ==
South Panola School District (SPSD) operates schools in Batesville and has its headquarters in Batesville. Batesville Elementary School, Batesville Intermediate School, Batesville Middle School, Batesville Junior High School, and South Panola High School serve Batesville.

A private academy founded in 1987, North Delta School, also serves Panola County and the surrounding area.

== Infrastructure ==
=== Transportation ===
Rail service is provided by Grenada Railway (formerly Illinois Central Railroad).

Amtrak's City of New Orleans used to provide passenger service, but the train was rerouted to the Delta region in 1995.

The short-lived Batesville Southwestern Railroad was established in Batesville.

== Notable people ==
- Lewis Edward Anderson, botanist
- Al Baker, former Major League Baseball player
- Kory Chapman, former National Football League player
- Jerry Dahlke, former Major League Baseball pitcher
- Cliff Finch, governor of Mississippi from 1976 to 1980
- Joe C. Gardner, Mississippi state legislator from 2007 to 2013
- Jermarcus Hardrick, CFL player for the Winnipeg Blue Bombers
- Darrell Henderson, NFL running back
- John Jerry, NFL offensive lineman
- Peria Jerry, University of Mississippi and Atlanta Falcons defensive tackle
- John W. Kyle, member of the Mississippi Supreme Court from 1950 to 1965
- Richard H. Leigh, four-star admiral and Commander-in-Chief of the United States Fleet from 1932 to 1933
- Ronnie Musgrove, governor of Mississippi from 2000 to 2004, was born in Tocowa in 1956 and reared in Batesville
- Derek Pegues, former professional football player
- Will Renfro, former NFL offensive tackle
- Jameson Rodgers, Country music singer-songwriter
- Dwayne Rudd, former NFL player for the Minnesota Vikings, Tampa Bay Buccaneers, Oakland Raiders, and Cleveland Browns
- Jamarca Sanford, former NFL safety
- Patrick Shegog, former quarterback for the Delta State Statesmen
- Soulja Boy, rapper
- Matthew Lyle Spencer, president of the University of Washington from 1927 to 1933 and first Dean of the School of Journalism at Syracuse University
- Superstar Pride, rapper
- Billy Tohill, head football coach for Texas Christian University from 1971 to 1973
- Deshea Townsend, Pittsburgh Steelers defensive back
- Sammy Vick, former Major League Baseball player
- Wesley Walls, former NFL tight end
- Thomas Wayne, rockabilly singer
- Doc Wood, former Major League Baseball shortstop
- Lee Woodruff, former NFL player
