= Richie Incognito =

American football player (born 1983)

Richie Incognito Jr.
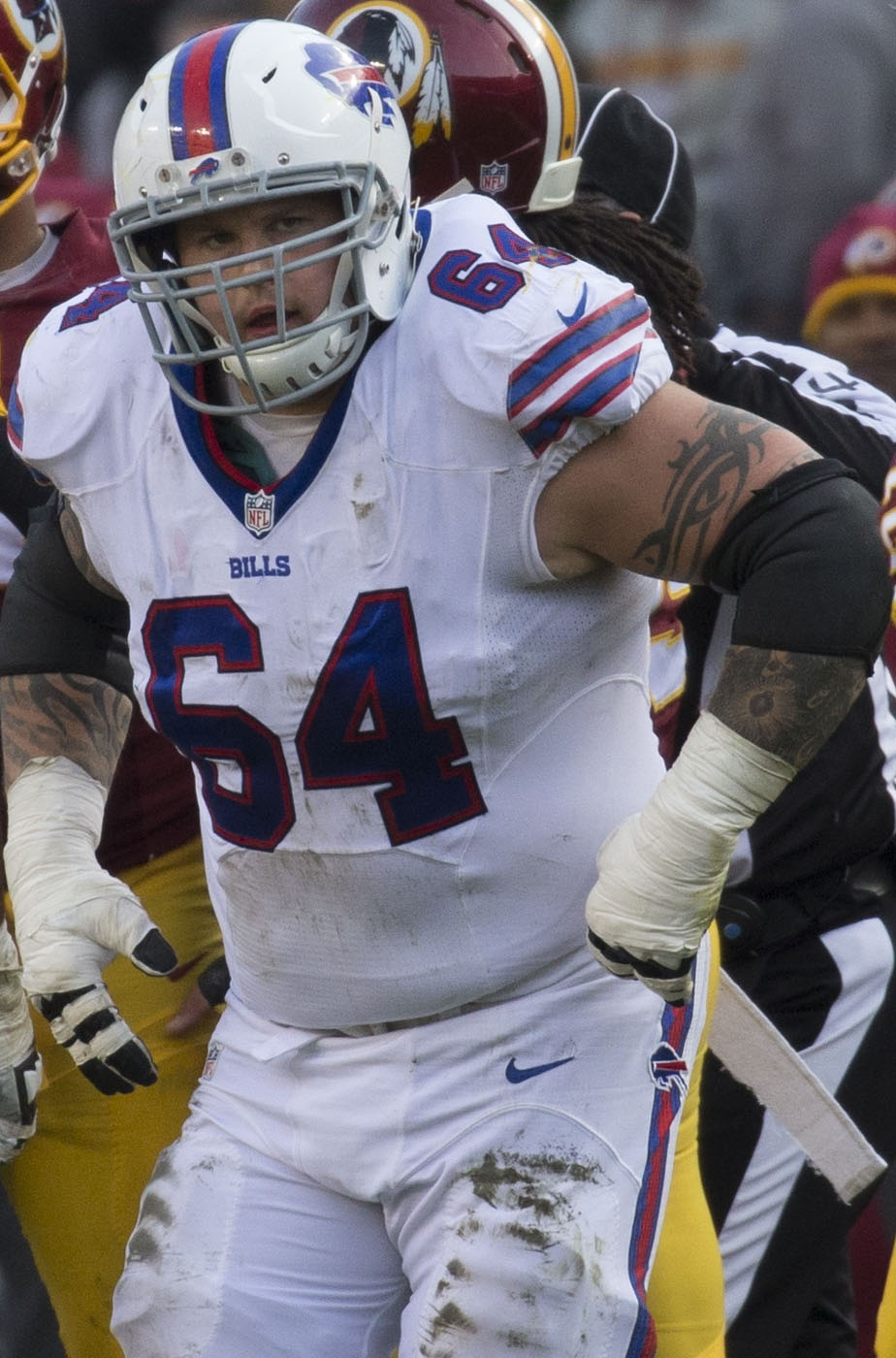
- Incognito with the Buffalo Bills in 2015

No. 68, 62, 64
- Position: Guard

Personal information
- Born: July 5, 1983 (age 43); Englewood, New Jersey, U.S.
- Listed height: 6 ft 3 in (1.91 m)
- Listed weight: 322 lb (146 kg)

Career information
- High school: Mountain Ridge (Glendale, Arizona)
- College: Nebraska (2001–2003)
- NFL draft: 2005: 3rd round, 81st overall pick

Career history
- St. Louis Rams (2005–2009); Buffalo Bills (2009); Miami Dolphins (2010–2013); Buffalo Bills (2015–2017); Oakland / Las Vegas Raiders (2019–2021)

Awards and highlights
- 4× Pro Bowl (2012, 2015–2017); First-team All-Big 12 (2003)

Career NFL statistics
- Games played: 164
- Games started: 164
- Fumble recoveries: 4
- Stats at Pro Football Reference

Richard Dominick Incognito Jr. (born July 5, 1983) is an American former professional football player who was a guard in the National Football League (NFL). He played college football for the Nebraska Cornhuskers and was selected by the St. Louis Rams in the third round of the 2005 NFL draft. He played for them through the 2009 season, and also played for the Miami Dolphins and Buffalo Bills, making four Pro Bowls. After sitting out the 2018 season, Incognito signed with the Oakland Raiders, where he played three more seasons before retiring again.

== Early life ==
Born in Englewood, New Jersey, Incognito grew up in nearby Bogota and moved to Glendale, Arizona as a pre-teen. Incognito played offense and defense at Mountain Ridge High School in Glendale, and served as a long snapper, helping the Mountain Lions football team to an 8–4 record and the first round of the state playoffs in 2000. An All-America offensive lineman, Incognito was named to PrepStar's 120-man Dream Team. He was a second-team honoree on the Long Beach Press-Telegram's Best in the West list. Incognito was a finalist for the Arizona Player-of-the-Year Award, was named the Brian Murray Award winner, and earned the Frank Kush Award, given to the best offensive lineman in Arizona. He also earned First-team All-State honors on offense from the Arizona Republic. Incognito also earned one letter in track and field (shot put) and also competed in weight lifting.

== College career ==
In 2001, Incognito redshirted at the University of Nebraska. In 2002, he became the first Husker freshman offensive lineman to start in the season opener and just the third rookie lineman to earn any start in his first year of competition. He played in all 14 games, started 13 at left tackle and posted the second-highest season pancake total in Husker history with 171. He was named a first-team freshman All-American by FWAA, Sporting News, and Rivals.com as well as first-team freshman All-Big 12 by the Sporting News.

At the same time, however, Incognito began displaying behavioral problems that would follow him throughout his career. During a practice early in the 2002 season, he hit walk-on lineman Jack Limbaugh from behind, prompting Limbaugh to stomp off the field in disgust. During his second game, against Troy State, he was accused of spitting on a Troy State player. Two weeks later, he was ejected for picking a fight in a blowout loss to Penn State. Per NCAA rules, he had to sit out the first half of the Huskers' next game, against Iowa State. In the second-to-last game of the season, against Colorado, he was flagged for a 15-yard personal foul penalty late in the game that largely contributed to the Huskers losing to the Buffaloes.

In the spring of 2003, Incognito was involved in a fight during practice and suspended indefinitely by head coach Frank Solich. By this time, Solich and his staff were concerned enough about Incognito's behavior to send him to the Menninger Clinic in Topeka, Kansas for anger management treatment. Incognito was reinstated by the start of the season and started 13 games at left tackle. He was rewarded with a first-team All-Big 12 selection by the Associated Press. However, during the Huskers' victory in the 2003 Alamo Bowl, he was accused of spitting on two Michigan State players.

In February 2004, Incognito was involved in a fight at a party and was charged with three counts of assault. In June, he was found guilty on one of the misdemeanor assault charges and paid a $500 fine. Incognito was shifted to center during the 2004 preseason camp. He entered the season with high expectations, listed on a number of preseason lists as a top center and named to the watch list for the Rimington Trophy going to the best center in college football. On September 1, however, he was suspended indefinitely for repeated violations of team rules. The final straw for new coach Bill Callahan came when Incognito was once again involved in a fight in the locker room. Within a few weeks, Incognito withdrew from all classes at Nebraska and left Lincoln.

In late September, he transferred to the University of Oregon, only to be dismissed from the team a week later. Head coach Mike Bellotti said Incognito failed to meet conditions he had agreed upon before his arrival in Eugene. Bellotti didn't elaborate, but Incognito had been required to complete an anger-management course and adhere to a strict code of conduct.

== Professional career ==
=== Pre-draft ===
At the 2005 NFL Combine, during a drill, Incognito stumbled and was carted off the field with a knee injury. The injury was later found to be a minor sprain that would have no long-term effect. Despite his impressive physical tools, ESPN Scouts Inc. noted "his inability to control his emotions both on and off the field is such a significant concern that he'll likely slip to the later rounds of the draft." Years later, then-Kansas City Chiefs general manager Scott Pioli, who was the player personnel director of the New England Patriots in 2005, said that he did not even consider taking Incognito then, "and I don't want him now" in Kansas City. Pioli had long been known for drafting players with checkered pasts. At the same time, former Indianapolis Colts coach Tony Dungy said that Incognito was on the Colts' "DNDC" ("do not draft because of character") list in 2005.

Pre-draft measurables
| Height | Weight | Arm length | Hand span | 40-yard dash | 10-yard split | 20-yard split | Bench press | Wonderlic |
|---|---|---|---|---|---|---|---|---|
| 6 ft 3 1/4 in (1.91 m) | 305 lb (138 kg) | 32 3/8 in (0.82 m) | 10 1/8 in (0.26 m) | 4.90 s | 1.70 s | 2.88 s | 29 reps | 32 |
All values from NFL Combine

=== St. Louis Rams ===
==== 2005 season ====
Incognito was selected by the St. Louis Rams in the third round of the 2005 NFL draft (81st overall). As a rookie in 2005, he was on the reserved/unsigned list until Week 3, then placed on the non-football injury list for the remainder of the season.

==== 2006 season ====
Incognito started all 16 games at three different positions, due to injuries and illness to the Rams' offensive line. That year, he blocked for an offense which produced a 4,000-yard passer, a 1,500-yard rusher, and two 1,000-yard receivers, one of only four offenses in NFL history to accomplish the feat.

==== 2007 season ====
Incognito played and started at the right guard position for four games after being inactive for the first four weeks of the season. In early November, Incognito suffered a knee injury that forced him to miss the remainder of season. However, while rehabilitating, it was later revealed that he had been partying nightly.

==== 2008 season ====
Incognito started 15 games at right guard for the Rams, and also saw some playing time at center. On October 17, Incognito was fined three times for a total of $35,000 after the game against the Washington Redskins. His violations included repeatedly berating an official, a "major face mask" on a field goal attempt, and a chop block. The last penalty was not called during the game, but was detected on a video review. Incognito's behavior nearly led to a loss after he was called for a 15-yard personal foul penalty before the eventual game-winning field goal.

Incognito was part of an offensive line that allowed 45 sacks. Although this was among the league's 10 worst in terms of sacks allowed, it was the fewest allowed by the Rams since 2003. Following the 2008 season, Incognito became a restricted free agent, although he continued to work out with the Rams during the off-season.

==== 2009 season ====
On April 17, 2009, the Rams offered Incognito a one-year tender worth $1.01 million, which he signed on May 3. Incognito started all nine games in which he played for the Rams in 2009. On December 13, during the first half of a 47–7 loss to the Tennessee Titans, Incognito drew two 15-yard penalties for headbutting Titans players. Head coach Steve Spagnuolo benched him for the second half, and the two got into a heated confrontation on the sidelines. It was the second time Incognito was benched for losing his composure; he had been pulled from the season opener against Seattle for two personal fouls. However, the Titans incident was the last straw; the Rams waived him two days after the game. In 2013, former Rams general manager Billy Devaney told ESPN that Spagnuolo had given Incognito numerous chances to clean up his act, and had put him on notice that the Rams would cut ties with him if he couldn't control his anger.

The two personal fouls led to a $50,000 fine from the NFL and a letter from the league office warning him that "future infractions of the types you have committed may lead to increased disciplinary action up to and including suspension." In four years with the Rams from 2006 to 2009, Incognito drew 38 penalties, including seven unnecessary roughness calls, more than any other player during that span.

=== Buffalo Bills (first stint) ===
Incognito was claimed by the Buffalo Bills off waivers on December 16, with the Miami Dolphins also submitting a claim. Incognito started the final three games of the season at the right guard position and helped block for Buffalo running back Fred Jackson's 212-yard rushing performance against Indianapolis on January 3. After the season, Incognito was a restricted free agent and the Bills declined to re-sign him.

=== Miami Dolphins ===
On March 17, 2010, the Dolphins signed Incognito to a one-year deal. Incognito started all 16 games of the season playing left guard and center. According to Pro Football Focus he was ranked in the Top 20 for Pass Blocking Efficiency.

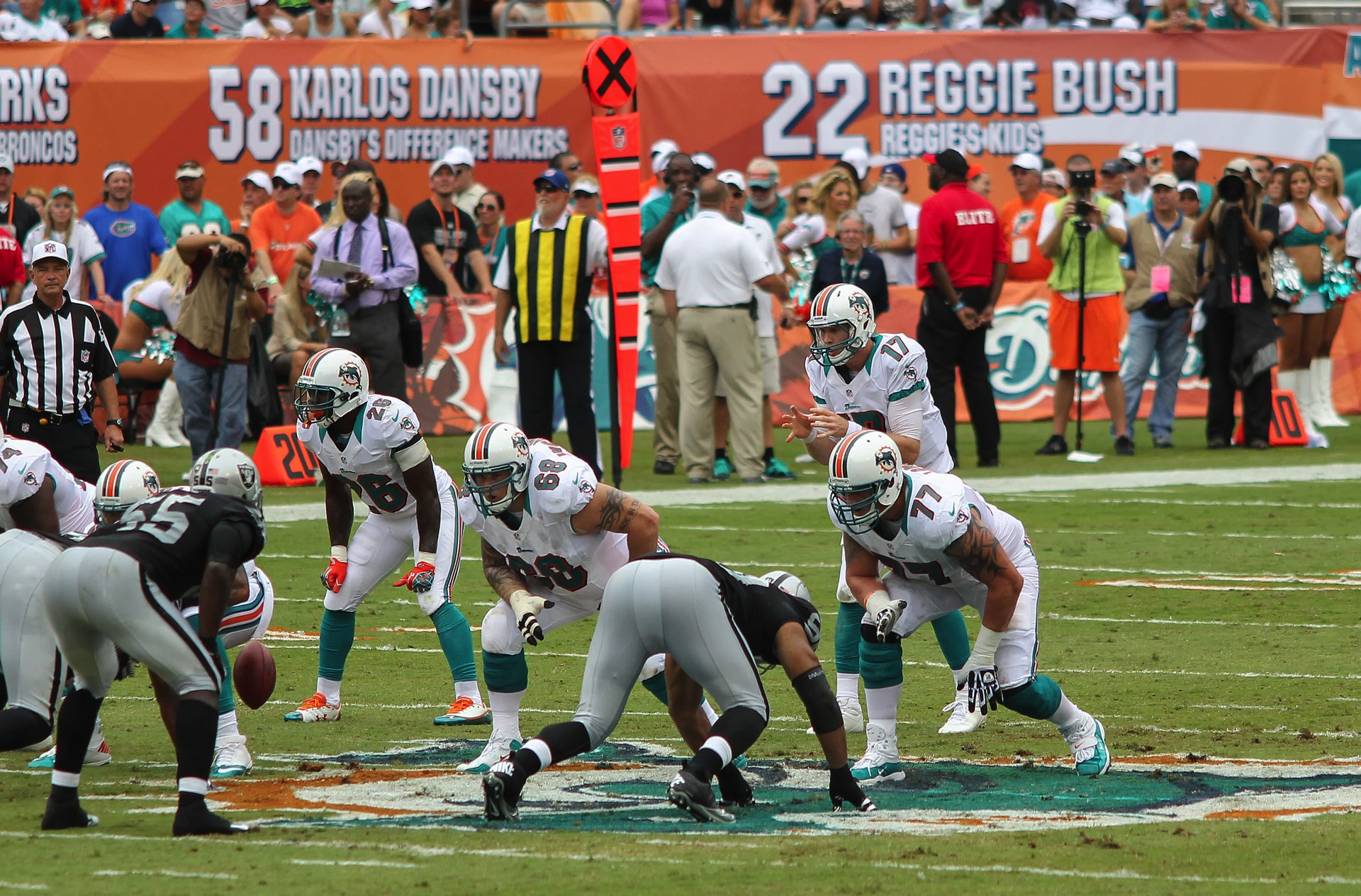
Incognito (#68) playing for the Dolphins in 2012 against the Oakland Raiders

In 2011, the Dolphins re-signed Incognito, this time to a three-year deal. Incognito started 15 games and allowed just 1.5 sacks on the year.

Incognito started all 16 games of the 2012 season at the left guard position. Incognito made his first of four National Football League Pro Bowl appearances after the 2012 season. Incognito also won the 2012 Good Guy Award alongside teammate Reggie Bush. The award is given out by the Pro Football Writers Association in each NFL city to the player(s) who best helps the media do its job.

On November 3, 2013, the Dolphins suspended Incognito for conduct detrimental to the team following his supposed harassment of teammate Jonathan Martin, a claim vociferously denied by Incognito. On February 4, 2014, Incognito's suspension was lifted. More than a decade later, Martin admitted publicly that his claims against Incognito and numerous other Dolphins' players and coaches were highly overstated, and had been pushed by his own mother. While still saying that he had received messages of a racial nature at the time, he clarified that he had never felt bullied, explaining that he "was not well" at the time, apparently referencing his own mental state. Incognito responded with sharp public criticism of the media, which he accused of pushing a lie against him at the time of the controversy.

=== Buffalo Bills (second stint) ===
==== 2015 season ====
After not playing for the entire 2014 NFL season, Incognito signed as a free agent with the Buffalo Bills on February 7, 2015. Incognito started all 16 games and participated in 100% of offensive snaps. He was ranked the second overall guard and the number one left guard in the NFL by the metrics website Pro Football Focus. Following the 2015 season, he was elected to his second Pro Bowl, this time as a replacement. He was ranked 97th on the NFL Top 100 Players of 2016 by his fellow players.

==== 2016 season ====
On March 8, 2016, Incognito agreed to terms on a three-year deal with the Bills worth $15,750,000. He was named to his third Pro Bowl of his career for his performance in 2016.

==== 2017 season ====
On December 19, 2017, Incognito was named to his fourth Pro Bowl after starting all 16 games at left guard.

A day after the Bills lost 10–3 against the Jacksonville Jaguars in the AFC Wild Card round, Jaguars' defensive end Yannick Ngakoue accused Incognito of using racial slurs against him during the game. Following the season's end, Incognito announced his intent to retire, noting that a recent doctor's visit had revealed he was suffering from liver and kidney failure, which he attributed to stress. Incognito also expressed dissatisfaction with a contract restructuring that would have kept him with the Bills in 2018, noting that he had given the Bills until April 15 to give him an offer worthy of his putting off his retirement for one more season.

Two days later, the Bills officially placed Incognito on the reserve/retired list. On April 13, 2018, Incognito announced he had had a change of heart and would show up to offseason workouts on April 16, 2018. He failed to arrive for the workouts, and the Bills continued to list him as retired. He indicated that he refused to play for the Bills and demanded he be released from his contract; the Bills responded that he would have to contact league commissioner Roger Goodell if he wanted to be removed from the retired list. On May 21, 2018, the Bills released Incognito from the reserve/retired list.

=== Oakland / Las Vegas Raiders ===
On May 28, 2019, Incognito signed with the Oakland Raiders. On July 12, 2019, the NFL suspended Incognito for two games for violating the league's personal conduct policy, stemming from an incident at an Arizona funeral home following his father's death the prior year. He was reinstated from suspension on September 16, and the Raiders were given a roster exemption for him. He was placed on the active roster the next day.

On December 30, 2019, the Raiders signed Incognito to a two-year, $14 million contract extension.

On September 23, 2020, Incognito was placed on injured reserve with an Achilles injury. On November 23, 2020, he underwent season-ending foot surgery. He appeared in two games in the 2020 season. He was released after the season on March 9, 2021, and re-signed to a new contract on March 24, 2021.

On September 25, 2021, Incognito was placed on injured reserve after missing the first two games with a calf strain.

=== Retirement ===
On July 15, 2022, Incognito announced his retirement after 16 seasons in the NFL.

== Controversies ==
=== Bullying scandal ===
In November 2013, ESPN reported on Incognito's alleged role in harassment of teammate Jonathan Martin. According to Incognito, he had reached out to Martin after he had left the team, and the two had an amicable text exchange, in which Incognito said that Martin had not blamed him or his teammates personally. Incognito subsequently expressed outrage over the report, going on Twitter to demand that ESPN's Adam Schefter "Stop slandering my name."

Schefter and Chris Mortensen reported on ESPN on November 3 that Martin feared "retribution, primarily from Incognito." The article went on to state that "the matter is absolutely under review and preliminarily identifies Incognito as an alleged offender in multiple incidents of possible harassment and bullying over the past two seasons, with Martin not the only victim." Schefter and Mortensen also cited unnamed sources that one of the significant allegations was an incident during the summer of 2013 when Incognito got Martin to contribute $15,000 to help finance a trip to Las Vegas by a group of Dolphins, even though Martin preferred not to, "fearing the consequences if he did not hand over the money."

On November 3, Mike Garafolo reported on Fox Sports 1 that Incognito was alleged to have sent Martin threatening and racially charged messages. He also reported that the team and league—rather than the players' association—had been asked to investigate. That same day, Jason La Canfora of CBS Sports reported that Incognito "has had to be reprimanded in the past for his actions toward team employees," citing an unnamed source. La Canfora and Schefter subsequently reported statements from an unnamed source that the team and the league had gotten possession of highly disturbing texts and voicemails in which Incognito used a racial slur against Martin, and disturbing text and voice exchanges including "a reference to tracking down members of Martin's family and harming them", and even threatening to kill Martin. According to La Canfora, Incognito's alleged harassment of Martin had reached the point that Martin feared for his safety, and felt leaving the team was his only option.

Just hours after the Dolphins' game against the Cincinnati Bengals, the Dolphins suspended Incognito indefinitely for conduct detrimental to the team. The Dolphins also asked the NFL to join their own internal investigation of the matter. According to Schefter, the final straw for the Dolphins was a highly graphic voicemail Incognito left in April 2013, in which Incognito called Martin a "half-nigger piece of shit," threatened to slap Martin's mother across the face, and uttered a death threat against Martin. Until then, the Dolphins had publicly maintained the charges against Incognito were pure speculation. Schefter said that as late as the afternoon of November 3, the Dolphins were unaware the voicemail existed. Within hours of hearing the tape, Schefter said, the Dolphins had suspended Incognito. The next day, a Dolphins source told The Miami Herald that Incognito would never play another down for the Dolphins again, and that the team intended to cut ties with him at the earliest opportunity.

On November 5, the (Fort Lauderdale) Sun-Sentinel quoted "multiple sources" as saying that Incognito may have taken orders from Dolphins coaches to "toughen up" Martin too far. The Sun-Sentinel reported that the controversial voice mail message that ultimately led to Incognito's suspension was made after Martin missed two days of the team's voluntary workout program. The coaches asked Incognito—by this time, reckoned as the leader of the offensive line—to make a call that would "get him (Martin) into the fold." On November 7, reports emerged that Miami GM Jeff Ireland reacted to the allegations by suggesting that Martin punch Incognito – however, rather than take things that far, Martin chose to leave the team.

Under the NFL's collective bargaining agreement, Incognito was initially slated to sit out for a maximum of four weeks. At the end of that time, the Dolphins would have had to either release him or find some way to keep him off the field, given earlier statements that he would never appear in a Dolphins uniform again. However, the league and the Dolphins agreed to extend the suspension for another two weeks with pay. On December 16, the league and the Dolphins announced that Incognito would remain suspended for the remainder of the season.

On February 3, 2014, the text messages exchanged between Martin and Incognito were leaked. It is thought that "the leak came from Incognito or someone close to him, because the text messages tend to support the notion that Incognito and Martin were friends. Moreover, nothing in the Incognito text messages suggests harassment or bullying of Martin." On February 4, 2014, Incognito's 3-month long suspension ended.

==== Investigator's report ====
On February 14, 2014, lawyer Ted Wells released a report (NFL summary) following an investigation into the matter ordered by the NFL. The investigation concluded that Incognito, and to a lesser extent fellow offensive linemen John Jerry and Mike Pouncey, bullied Martin, yet another (unnamed) Dolphins offensive lineman, and also a Dolphins staff member, an unnamed assistant trainer.

The report also concluded that Incognito, Jerry, and Pouncey made severe racial slurs towards the assistant trainer, and Incognito and Jerry taunted him by saying that they had sex with his girlfriend. On December 7, 2012, the anniversary of the Japanese attack on Pearl Harbor, Incognito, Jerry and Pouncey donned traditional Japanese headbands featuring a rising sun emblem (which the assistant trainer had given them) and jokingly threatened to harm the assistant trainer physically in retaliation for the Pearl Harbor attack. The assistant trainer, who is from Japan, confided in Martin that he was upset about the Pearl Harbor comments, finding them derogatory toward his heritage.

Further, the report concluded regarding Martin's "mental health problems, alcohol and drug use and... concerns about poor performance on the field" that "his text messages and other evidence demonstrate that these are real factors, not issues Incognito has manufactured out of whole cloth." The report noted a published newspaper report regarding Martin's difficulties with the position change the Dolphins made with him days before he left the team and alleged harassment. The Miami Herald noted that the Dolphins were concerned about Martin's reaction to the move, and noted that "It was clear Martin isn't thrilled about the move." "You can approach this two different ways," Martin said. "You can go in the tank and be one of those guys who bitches and moans and is a cancer in the locker room, or you can be a guy who goes out there and can be a professional and plays as hard as I can."

==== Response ====
After the bullying scandal and his release from the Dolphins organization, Incognito sought help through therapy when he voluntarily checked himself into an Arizona treatment facility. After months of treatment, Incognito described his experience and growth as "very difficult" because "there's no doubt things were said and things were texted and things were done where I clearly crossed the line...that's part of the learning process I went through, and just growing up and maturing and being aware of your surroundings and who your audience is."

After sitting out the 2014 season, Rex Ryan and the Buffalo Bills signed Incognito for the 2015 season with the intent to "build a bully". According to teammate Eric Wood, Incognito was seen as an "ultimate professional" and "quickly became a locker room favorite". Incognito re-elevated his game and helped the Bills lead the league in rushing yards and yards-per-carry.

Prior to the 2016 season, Incognito sat down with Colin Cowherd for an interview on the radio show The Herd where he talked about his relationship with Jonathan Martin since the bullying scandal stating their relationship ended that day, and that "You learn from it you move on".

==== Martin reframes narrative ====
In February 2025, Martin did a lengthy ESPN interview, where he stated that "he never felt bullied" by Incognito and others in the Dolphins' organization during the controversy of over a decade prior, saying that it was actually his mother that first used the term "Bullying." However, Martin made clear in the interview that the actions by Incognito, Pouncey, and Jerry were still extreme and inappropriate and that he did not excuse their conduct. Incognito responded with fierce criticism of the media for the allegations made against him at the time. Nolan Carroll, a teammate of both Incognito and Martin, also responded publicly, furiously condemning Martin for the damage done to the 2013 Dolphins, and specifically to numerous named players, coaches and executives. Several tabloid opinion pieces also expressed outrage at the original narrative, pointing to pulled quotes from the ESPN article and claiming that Martin lied, despite the Wells Report, voicemail, and other evidence highlighted by Mike Florio at ProFootballTalk that excessive abuse beyond NFL norms did occur in the Dolphins locker room.

=== Allegations of dirty play ===
Incognito garnered attention over the years for perceived dirty play amongst NFL players, coaches, and fans. He is alleged to have gouged players' eyes, punched players, and to have regularly made illegal tackles. In 2009, NFL players voted Incognito the dirtiest player in the league, according to a Sporting News poll.

=== Involuntary commitment ===
On May 23, 2018, Incognito was placed on an "involuntary psychiatric hold" for his part in an altercation at a Life Time Fitness health club in Boca Raton, Florida. Incognito allegedly threw a tennis ball and a dumbbell at another gym patron. He was reported to be in an "altered, paranoid state," suspecting that he was being spied on. On June 6, 2018, he was back in training, hoping to get back to the NFL.

=== Funeral home incident and arrest ===
On August 20, 2018, Incognito was arrested after an incident at a funeral home where he threatened to shoot employees while making funeral arrangements for his father. Police seized two Glocks, three rifles, and a suppressor for a handgun in Incognito's truck. Employees told Scottsdale police that Incognito wanted his father's head to be donated for research purposes, and that he had walked through the funeral home punching caskets and throwing objects. Incognito was charged with disorderly conduct and making threats.

== Personal life ==
Incognito is the oldest son of Richard Incognito Sr. and Donna Incognito, who also have a younger son, Derek. His father was of Italian and German descent. Incognito supports Operation Homefront, an organization that provides assistance to families of service members and wounded soldiers. During the 2012 season, he hosted a private screening and book reading of the animated film Rise of the Guardians for Operation Homefront, where he led a book reading to over 100 children before the screening of the film. Politically, he is a supporter of the Republican Party, and publicly supported Donald Trump in the 2016 Presidential election.

In July 2018, Incognito was named a national ambassador for Boo2Bullying, an anti-bullying nonprofit based in Los Angeles. In a statement announcing this nomination, he said he could "relate to both sides", being bullied and bullying others.
