= John Jerry =

American football player (born 1986)

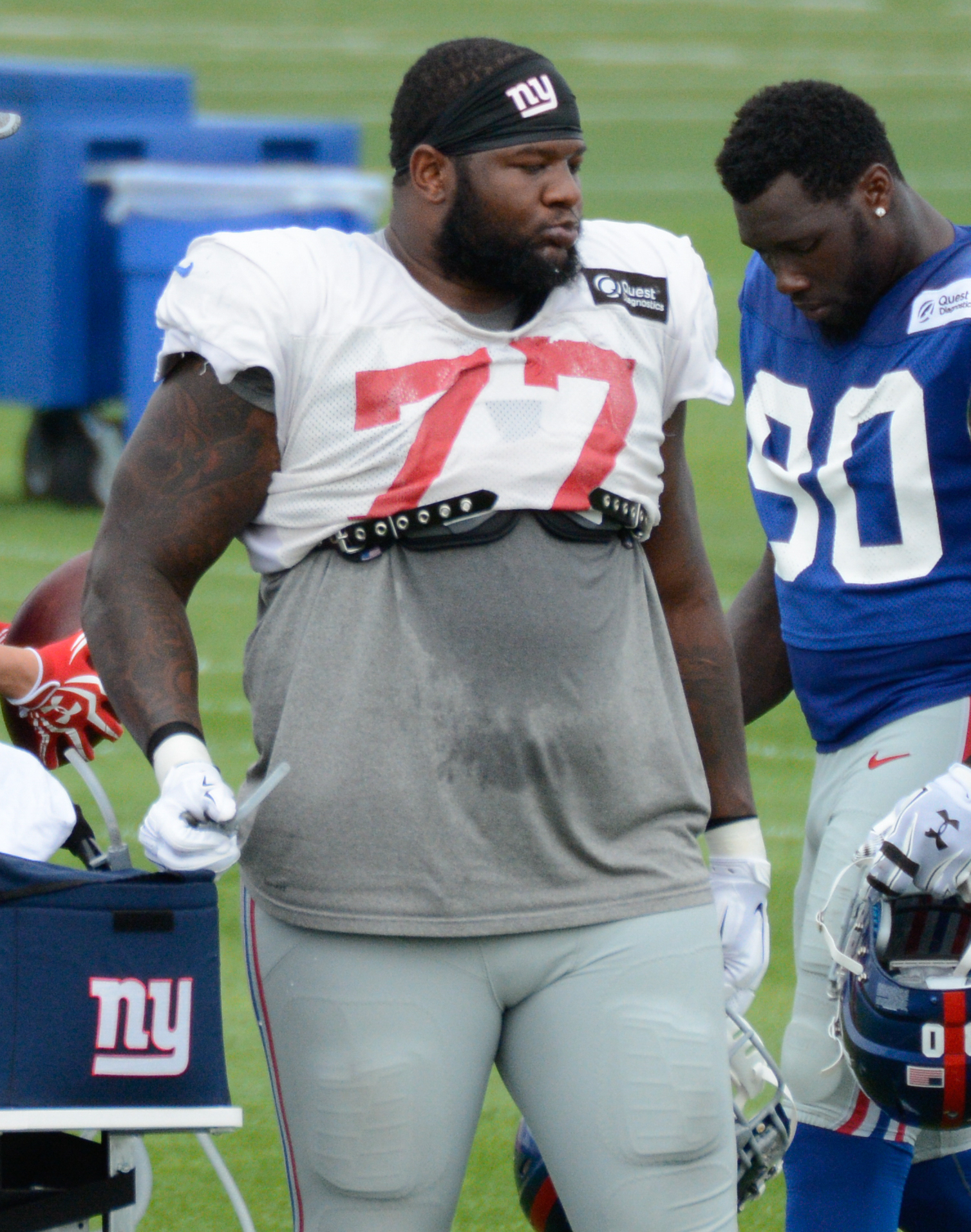
- Jerry with the New York Giants in 2016

No. 74, 77, 64
- Position: Guard

Personal information
- Born: June 14, 1986 (age 40); Memphis, Tennessee, U.S.
- Listed height: 6 ft 5 in (1.96 m)
- Listed weight: 340 lb (154 kg)

Career information
- High school: South Panola (Batesville, Mississippi)
- College: Mississippi
- NFL draft: 2010: 3rd round, 73rd overall pick

Career history
- Miami Dolphins (2010–2013); New York Giants (2014–2017); Cincinnati Bengals (2019)

Awards and highlights
- PFWA All-Rookie Team (2010); Third-team All-American (2009); First-team All-SEC (2009); Second-team All-SEC (2008)

Career NFL statistics
- Games played: 132
- Games started: 106
- Stats at Pro Football Reference

John Jerry (born June 14, 1986) is an American former professional football player who was a guard in the National Football League (NFL). He played college football for the Ole Miss Rebels and was selected by the Miami Dolphins in the third round of the 2010 NFL draft. He also played for the New York Giants and Cincinnati Bengals.

== Early life ==
Jerry attended South Panola High School in Batesville, Mississippi, where he was a two-way lineman and his career totals included 205 tackles, with 13 quarterback sacks. As a senior, he made 88 tackles, including five quarterback sacks, and returned one pass interception for a touchdown. He helped lead South Panola High School and coach Ricky Woods to a 44–1 record, including state championships in 2003 and 2004, while being runners-up in 2002.

Considered a three-star recruit by Rivals.com, Jerry was listed as the No. 27 offensive tackle prospect in the nation.

== College career ==
After a prep school year at Hargrave Military Academy, Jerry started all 12 contests at right guard for the Ole Miss Rebels in 2006. He was honored by several postseason publications as one of the top freshman linemen in the country, including The Sporting News and Rivals.com. In 2007, he played in all 12 games and started nine at the right guard position.

Jerry was moved to right tackle and started all 13 games at the position in 2008, and earned second-team All-SEC honors from the SEC Coaches and Phil Steele.

In 2009, Jerry was listed at No. 5 on Rivals.com's preseason offensive tackle power ranking. He was also named to the 2009 Outland Trophy watch list.

== Professional career ==
=== Pre-draft ===
Jerry was considered one of the better offensive linemen available in the 2010 NFL draft. He drew comparisons to Leonard Davis.

Pre-draft measurables
Height	Weight	Arm length	Hand span	40-yard dash	10-yard split	20-yard split	20-yard shuttle	Three-cone drill	Vertical jump	Broad jump	Bench press
6 ft 5 3/8 in (1.97 m)	328 lb (149 kg)	34 in (0.86 m)	9 3/4 in (0.25 m)	5.15 s	1.83 s	3.05 s	4.69 s	7.93 s	27.5 in (0.70 m)	8 ft 5 in (2.57 m)	31 reps
All values from NFL Combine/Pro Day

=== Miami Dolphins ===
On draft day, Jerry was selected by the Miami Dolphins in the third round with the 73rd overall pick.

In February 2014, the NFL released the "Wells Report" finding that Jerry, along with Dolphins teammates Richie Incognito and Mike Pouncey, had bullied and harassed lineman Jonathan Martin, another unnamed player, and an assistant trainer during the 2012-13 seasons. The harassment of the assistant trainer, in which Jerry took part, included racial insults.

=== New York Giants ===
On March 21, 2014, Jerry was signed by the New York Giants. On March 13, 2015, Jerry re-signed with the Giants.

On March 13, 2017, Jerry signed a three-year, $10 million contract extension with the Giants. He started all 16 games for the Giants at right guard in 2017.

On September 2, 2018, Jerry was released by the Giants.

=== Cincinnati Bengals ===
On June 10, 2019, Jerry signed with the Cincinnati Bengals. He was released during final roster cuts on August 31, but was re-signed two days later.

== Personal life ==
John Jerry is the younger brother of Peria Jerry, a former defensive tackle for the Atlanta Falcons. His cousins Eddie Strong and Dwayne Rudd also played in the NFL.
