= Maurkice Pouncey =

American football player (born 1989)

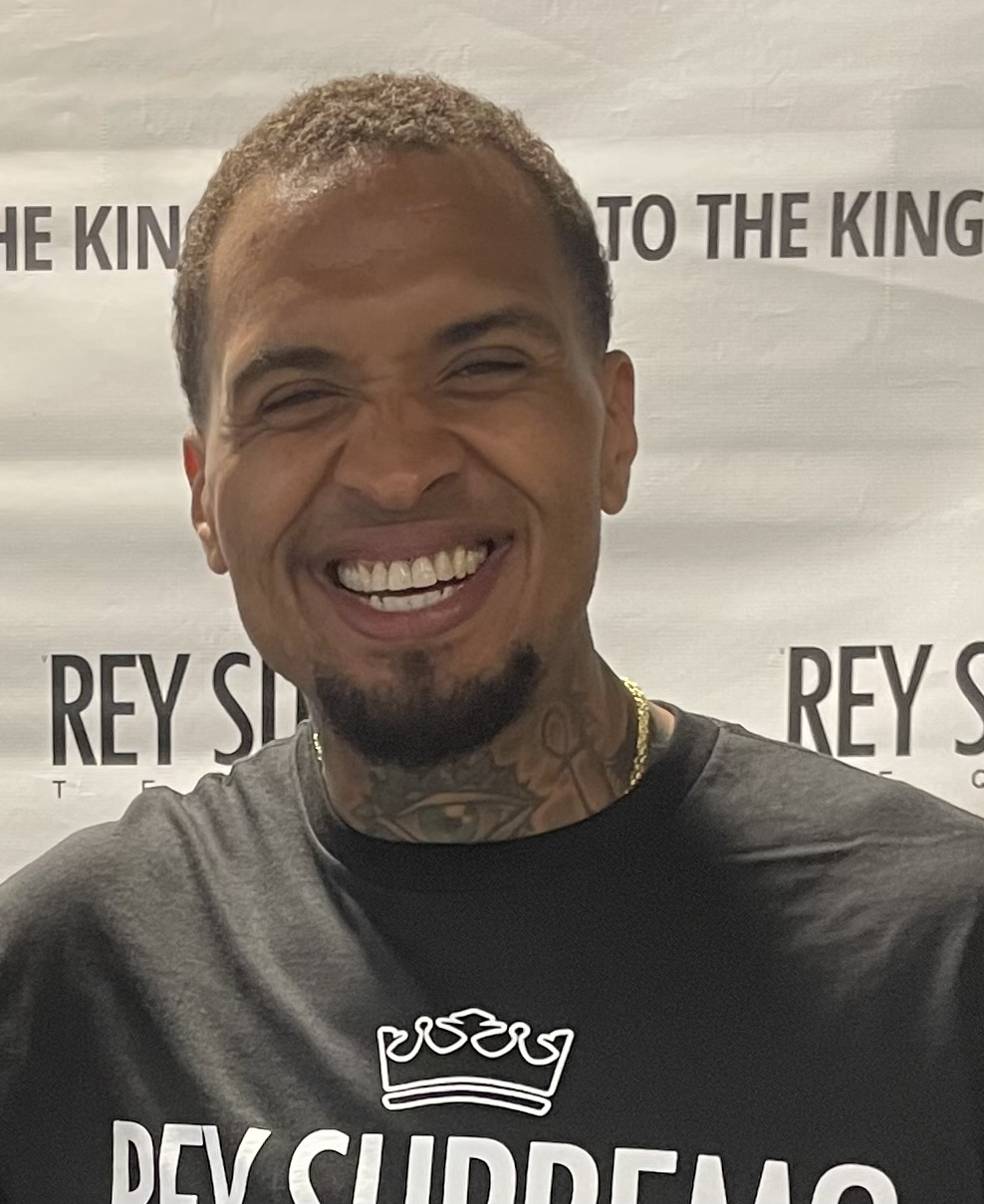
- Pouncey in 2024

No. 53
- Position: Center

Personal information
- Born: July 24, 1989 (age 37); Ardmore, Oklahoma, U.S.
- Listed height: 6 ft 4 in (1.93 m)
- Listed weight: 304 lb (138 kg)

Career information
- High school: Lakeland (Lakeland, Florida)
- College: Florida (2007–2009)
- NFL draft: 2010: 1st round, 18th overall pick

Career history
- Pittsburgh Steelers (2010–2020)

Awards and highlights
- 2× First-team All-Pro (2011, 2014); 3× Second-team All-Pro (2010, 2012, 2018); 9× Pro Bowl (2010–2012, 2014, 2016–2020); NFL 2010s All-Decade Team; PFWA All-Rookie Team (2010); Pittsburgh Steelers Hall of Honor; BCS national champion (2009); Rimington Trophy (2009); Consensus All-American (2009); First-team All-SEC (2009)

Career NFL statistics
- Games played: 134
- Games started: 134
- Fumble recoveries: 2
- Stats at Pro Football Reference

LaShawn Maurkice Pouncey (born July 24, 1989) is an American former professional football player who was a center for 11 seasons with the Pittsburgh Steelers of the National Football League (NFL). He played college football for the Florida Gators, where he was a member of a BCS National Championship team, recognized as a consensus All-American, and won the 2009 Rimington Trophy, awarded annually to the best college football center. He was selected by the Steelers in the first round of the 2010 NFL draft. Pouncey was a nine-time Pro Bowler and named to five All-Pro teams, and was also named to the NFL 2010s All-Decade Team. He is the twin brother of former NFL center Mike Pouncey.

== Early life ==
Pouncey was born in Ardmore, Oklahoma. He attended Lakeland High School in Lakeland, Florida, where he was a standout lineman for the Lakeland Dreadnaughts high school football team. As a senior in 2006, he helped lead Lakeland High to its third consecutive Florida Class 5A state championship and second straight USA Today national championship.

Considered a four-star recruit by Rivals.com, he chose Florida over offers from Florida State, Clemson, Miami, and Michigan.

== College career ==
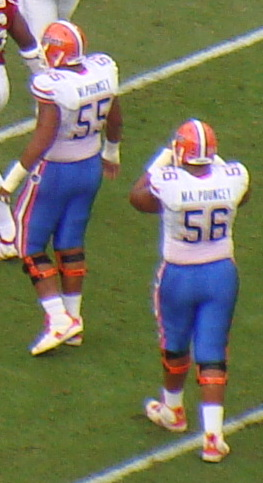
Pouncey (#56) with his twin brother Mike Pouncey with the Florida Gators in 2008

Pouncey accepted an athletic scholarship to attend the University of Florida in Gainesville, Florida, where he played for coach Urban Meyer's Gators teams from 2007 to 2009.

Pouncey began attending the University of Florida early in 2007. His twin brother Mike would also join the Gators, playing defensive line his first season to help an injury-riddled defense. Maurkice saw action at right guard and center his freshman year. He started the season at right guard for the season opener against Western Kentucky, becoming only the seventh true freshman in team history to do so. In a week 6 loss to No. 6 LSU, he would have a grade of 86%. The next week he would have a grade of 85% while the Gators would upset the No. 8 Kentucky. On November 3, 2007, he would again get a champion grade of 83% in a win over Vanderbilt. He finished the season starting 11 games at right guard and playing in all 13. Rivals and College Football News selected him as a freshman first-team All-American and he would also be voted to the Freshman All-SEC team by the coaches and Sporting News.

Beginning in 2008, Pouncey became the full-time starting center for Florida next to his twin brother Mike at right guard. He compiled six games with a grade of 90% or better. The first came in week 3 against Tennessee, where he would have a grade of 93%. In week 6 he was recognized as the SEC Offensive Lineman of the Week for his performance against Arkansas. Pouncey would have a season-high grade of 97% against LSU and then 98% the next game against Kentucky. While playing South Carolina he would have a grade of 90, his last above that mark for the season. The Gators would go on to win the SEC Championship and then defeat Oklahoma to win the FedEx BCS National Championship.

In the season opener against Charleston Southern, he began 2009 with a grade of 98% and had two knockdowns in the game. The next week, he would again post a grade of 98% in a victory over Troy. In the first SEC game of the year, Pouncey would play 61 snaps and receive a grade of 93% for the game. During the week 4 match-up against Kentucky, he would end with a grade of 90% and receive Champion Club Honors. On October 10, Florida traveled to Death Valley to face No. 4 LSU. He would have a season-high grade of 99% in the 13–3 victory over the Tigers. His 28th consecutive start would also be his last game at the Swamp. The Gators would go on to defeat Florida State, 37–10. After going undefeated the entire regular season, the Gators would lose to No. 2 Alabama in the SEC Championship. His last game would be the 2010 AllState Sugar Bowl against No. 4 Cincinnati and he would finish his season with an average grade of 91.5% and 30 knockdowns. Pouncey won the Rimington Award, becoming Florida's first player to do so. He was also voted a first-team All-American by CBSsports.com, Sporting News, Football Weekly, and Walter Camp.

He finished his career with 39 starts in 41 games played. After his junior season, he entered the NFL draft.

== Professional career ==
Pouncey entered the 2010 NFL draft as the consensus No. 1 center available, ahead of Matt Tennant, J. D. Walton, and Eric Olsen.

Pre-draft measurables
Height	Weight	Arm length	Hand span	40-yard dash	10-yard split	20-yard split	20-yard shuttle	Three-cone drill	Vertical jump	Broad jump	Bench press
6 ft 4 1/2 in (1.94 m)	304 lb (138 kg)	32 1/2 in (0.83 m)	10 in (0.25 m)	5.29 s	1.83 s	3.07 s	4.92 s	7.74 s	26 in (0.66 m)	7 ft 11 in (2.41 m)	27 reps
Stats from NFL Scouting Combine/Florida pro-day

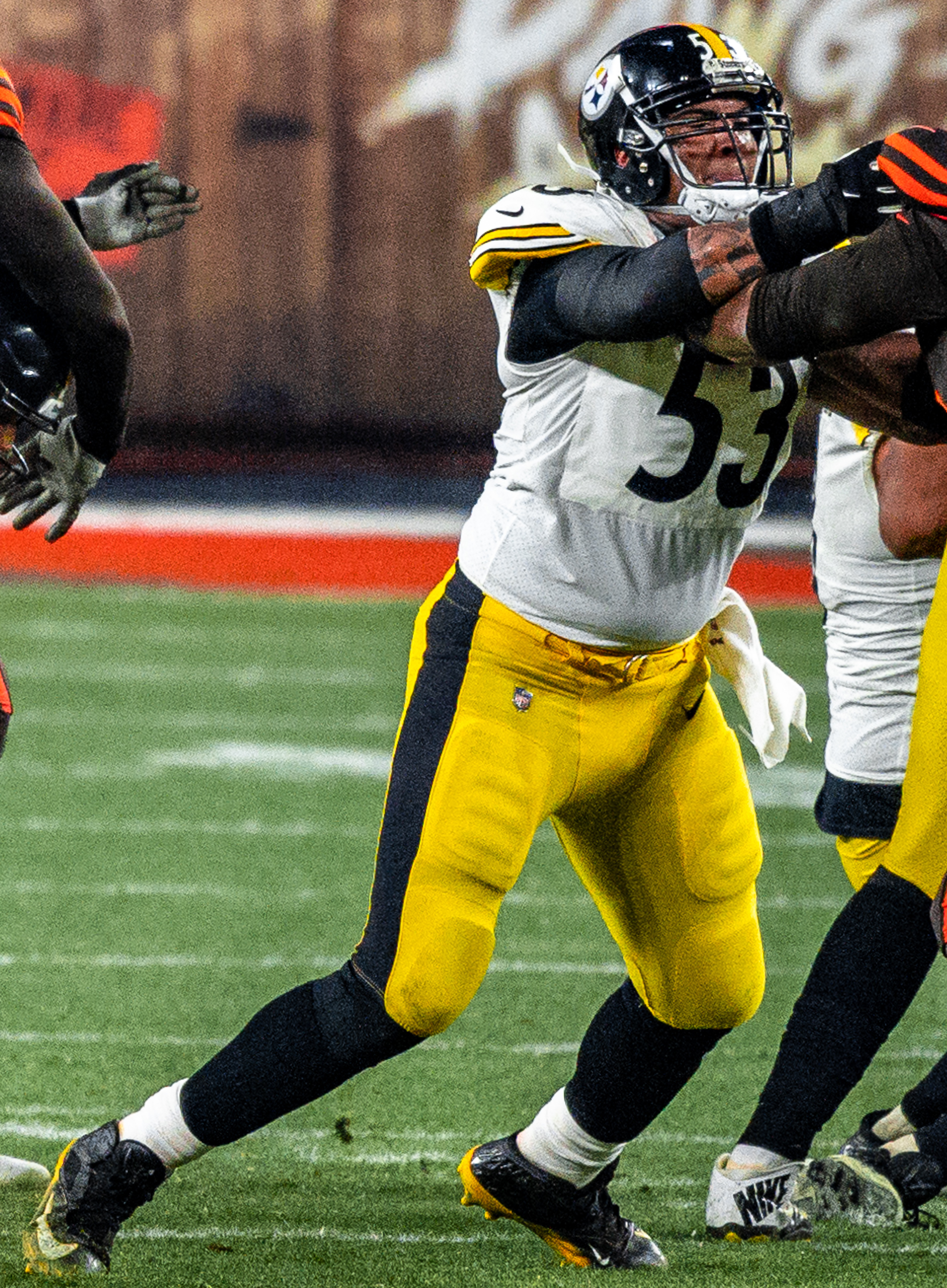
Pouncey with the Steelers in 2019

The Pittsburgh Steelers chose Pouncey in the first round (18th pick overall). He was the highest selected center since Damien Woody.

On July 30, 2010, the Pittsburgh Steelers signed Pouncey to a five-year, $14.80 million contract with $7.94 million guaranteed.

In his rookie year, he started in all 16 games played at the center position, and was selected to the Pro Bowl. Additionally, in accordance with his exceptional play as a center during his rookie year, he received 2 votes (out of 50) for the National Football League Rookie of the Year Award. In the AFC Championship, Pouncey injured his ankle during the win over the New York Jets and was not able to play in the Super Bowl. The Steelers lost the Super Bowl to the Green Bay Packers.

Pouncey played 14 games in 2011 and 15 games in 2012. He earned first team All-Pro honors for the 2011 season. Both those years, he was a Pro Bowl selection. He was ranked 49th by his fellow players on the NFL Top 100 Players of 2012.

In Week 1 of the 2013 season, Pouncey tore his right ACL and MCL after Steelers guard David DeCastro accidentally dove into Pouncey's right leg while trying to assist Pouncey in blocking Tennessee Titans defensive tackle Sammie Lee Hill. He was subsequently placed on injured reserve, ending his season.

On June 12, 2014, the Pittsburgh Steelers signed Pouncey to a five-year, $44.12 million contract extension with a $13 million signing bonus. This extension made him, at that time, the highest paid center in the National Football League. After a successful recovery from knee surgery, Pouncey started all 16 games in 2014 and was selected to the Pro Bowl for the fourth time of his career. He was named as a first team All-Pro selection for the second time. He was ranked 83rd by his fellow players on the NFL Top 100 Players of 2015.

On August 23, 2015, during the Steelers' first preseason game, Pouncey suffered a broken fibula when Green Bay Packers safety Ha Ha Clinton-Dix rolled onto the back of Pouncey's ankle. His recovery was delayed further after he developed an infection that required a second surgery. Pouncey ultimately missed the entire 2015 season.

Pouncey started in 15 regular season games and three postseason games in the 2016 season. He was named to his fifth career Pro Bowl in recognition of his 2016 season.

On December 19, 2017, Pouncey was named to his sixth Pro Bowl along with fellow Steeler offensive linemen Alejandro Villanueva and David DeCastro. In the 2017 season, Pouncey started 15 regular season games and one postseason game.

In the 2018 season, Pouncey started all 16 games.

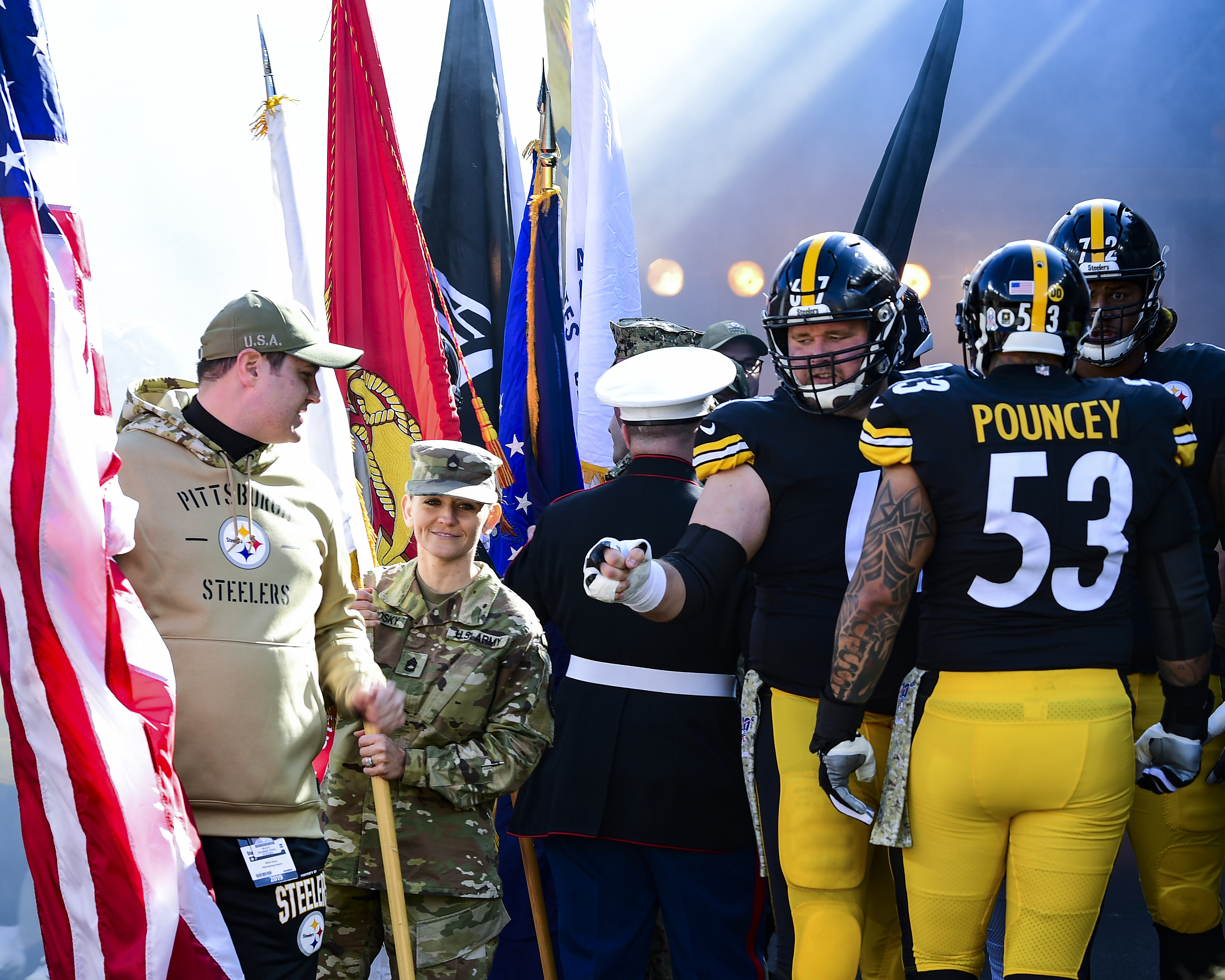
Pouncey in with two U.S. Military veterans in 2019

On March 7, 2019, Pouncey signed a three-year, $33 million contract extension with the Steelers through the 2021 season, making him the highest-paid center in the NFL. On November 14, 2019, during Thursday Night Football against the Cleveland Browns in Week 11, Pouncey was involved in a brawl with Myles Garrett. Pouncey threw punches and kicked Garrett, resulting in the two getting ejected. The next day, the NFL suspended Pouncey three games for fighting. This was then shortened to a two-game suspension following a successful appeal by Pouncey. Pouncey was reinstated from suspension on December 2, 2019, and activated on December 4; he returned for the Steelers' 23–17 win at the Arizona Cardinals. He started in 13 games in the 2019 season.

Pouncey was placed on the reserve/COVID-19 list by the Steelers on December 2, 2020, and activated on December 11. He started in 13 regular season games and the Steelers' Wild Card Round loss in the 2020 season. He was named to his ninth Pro Bowl for his performance in the 2020 season.

On February 12, 2021, Pouncey announced his retirement, alongside his brother, after an 11-season career. He was placed on the reserve/retired list by the team on March 1, 2021.

== Personal life ==
Pouncey's identical twin brother Mike Pouncey was selected 15th overall by the Miami Dolphins in the 2011 NFL draft. Maurkice is one minute younger than Mike. Pouncey has two daughters.

== See also ==
- 2008 Florida Gators football team
- 2009 College Football All-America Team
- List of Florida Gators football All-Americans
- List of Florida Gators in the NFL draft
- List of Pittsburgh Steelers first-round draft picks
- List of Pittsburgh Steelers players
