= Conerly Trophy =

US college football award

- Awarded for: The best college football player in the state of Mississippi
- Location: Mississippi
- Country: United States
- Presented by: Mississippi Sports Hall of Fame

History
- First award: 1996
- Most recent: Trinidad Chambliss, QB, Ole Miss
- Website: Mississippi Sports Hall of Fame Events

The C Spire Conerly Trophy is an award given annually to the best college football player in the state of Mississippi by the Mississippi Sports Hall of Fame.

== Background ==
The award was begun in 1996 and has been sponsored by C Spire Wireless, formerly known as Cellular South, since 1998. Previous presentations have been held in Jackson, Clarksdale, Tunica and Biloxi. The namesake of the award is Mississippi-born Charlie Conerly who played quarterback for the Ole Miss Rebels.

Sixty media representatives from across Mississippi determine the winner. All players at Mississippi's four-year college football programs are eligible on the first ballot. Previously, the top three vote-getters were listed on a second and final ballot, but starting with the 2011 award, each of the four-year colleges and universities in Mississippi that field football teams are represented by one finalist. In 2013, fans were allowed to vote on the award for the first time. Fan voting accounted for 10 percent of the total vote.

The trophy itself is a bronze casting, 19" high x 11" long x 7.5" wide, weighing 18.5 lbs. (8.4 kg). The trophy was sculpted by Bruce Holmes Brady, a Brookhaven, Mississippi native and graduate of the University of Mississippi. The original trophy is on permanent display at the Mississippi Sports Hall of Fame and Museum. A replica of the trophy is presented to the winner each year at the announcement dinner.

== Winners ==
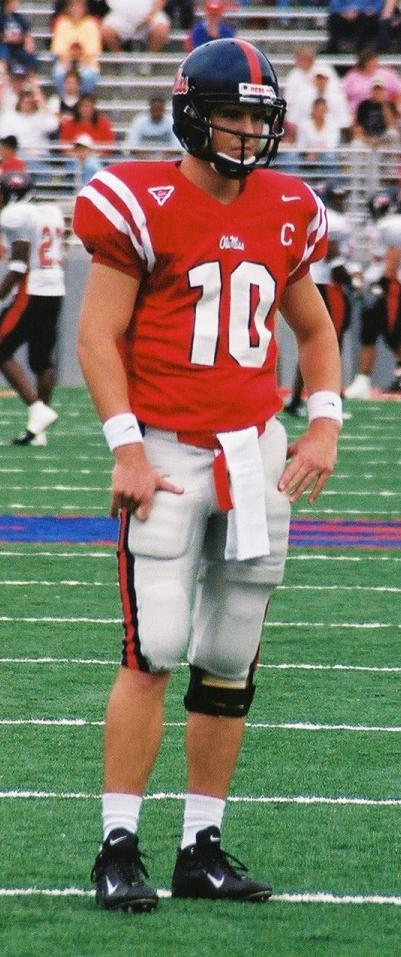
Ole Miss quarterback Eli Manning won the Conerly Trophy in 2001 and 2003.

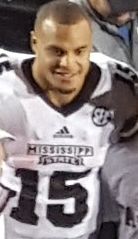
Mississippi State quarterback Dak Prescott won the Conerly Trophy in 2014 and 2015.

Conerly Trophy winners
Year	Winner	Pos	School	Ref
1996	Tregnel Thomas	RB	Delta State	
1997	Stewart Patridge	QB	Ole Miss	
1998	J. J. Johnson	RB	Mississippi State	
1999	Deuce McAllister	RB	Ole Miss	
2000	Josh Bright	QB	Delta State	
2001	Eli Manning	QB	Ole Miss	
2002	Rod Davis	LB	Southern Miss	
2003	Eli Manning	QB	Ole Miss	
2004	Michael Boley	LB	Southern Miss	
2005	Jerious Norwood	RB	Mississippi State	
2006	Patrick Willis	LB	Ole Miss	
2007	Damion Fletcher	RB	Southern Miss	
2008	Juan Joseph	QB	Millsaps	
2009	Anthony Dixon	RB	Mississippi State	
2010	Chris White	LB	Mississippi State	
2011	Austin Davis	QB	Southern Miss	
2012	Bo Wallace	QB	Ole Miss	
2013	Gabe Jackson	G	Mississippi State	
2014	Dak Prescott	QB	Mississippi State	
2015	Dak Prescott	QB	Mississippi State	
2016	Evan Engram	TE	Ole Miss	
2017	A. J. Brown	WR	Ole Miss	
2018	Jeffery Simmons	DL	Mississippi State	
2019	Kylin Hill	RB	Mississippi State	
2020	Elijah Moore	WR	Ole Miss	
2021	Matt Corral	QB	Ole Miss	
2022	Quinshon Judkins	RB	Ole Miss	
2023	Patrick Shegog	QB	Delta State	
2024	Jaxson Dart	QB	Ole Miss	
2025	Trinidad Chambliss	QB	Ole Miss	

== Kent Hull Trophy ==
Kent Hull Trophy
- Awarded for: The best college football offensive lineman in the state of Mississippi
- Location: Mississippi
- Country: United States
- Presented by: Mississippi Sports Hall of Fame & Kent Hull Foundation

History
- First award: 2013
- Most recent: Patrick Kutas, G, Ole Miss

Starting in 2013, the Mississippi Sports Hall of Fame began awarding a second award, the Kent Hull Trophy, for the best college offensive lineman in Mississippi.

Kent Hull Trophy winners
Year	Winner	Pos	School	Ref.
2013	Gabe Jackson	G	Mississippi State	
2014	Laremy Tunsil	T	Ole Miss	
2015	Fahn Cooper	T	Ole Miss	
2016	Justin Senior	T	Mississippi State	
2017	Martinas Rankin	T	Mississippi State	
2018	Elgton Jenkins	C	Mississippi State	
2019	Drake Dorbeck	T	Southern Miss	
2020	Royce Newman	G	Ole Miss	
2021	Charles Cross	T	Mississippi State	
2022	Nick Broeker	G	Ole Miss	
2023	Cole Smith	C	Mississippi State	
2024	Albert Reese IV	T	Mississippi State	
2025	Patrick Kutas	G	Ole Miss	

== See also ==
- Howell Trophy - award given annually to the best men's college basketball player in the state of Mississippi by the Mississippi Sports Hall of Fame.
- Gillom Trophy - award given annually to the best women's college basketball player in the state of Mississippi by the Mississippi Sports Hall of Fame.
- C Spire Ferriss Trophy - award given annually to the best men's college baseball player in the state of Mississippi by the Mississippi Sports Hall of Fame.
