= Superstar Pride =

American rapper (born 2002)

- Born: Cadarrius Pride; March 15, 2002 (age 24); Batesville, Mississippi, U.S.
- Origin: Sardis, Mississippi, U.S.
- Genre: Hip hop
- Occupation: Rapper
- Years active: 2019–2023; 2026–present

Cadarrius Pride (born March 15, 2002), known professionally as Superstar Pride, is an American rapper. His single "Painting Pictures" reached number 25 on the US Billboard Hot 100.

== Early life and career beginnings ==
Cadarrius Pride was born on March 15, 2002, in Batesville, Mississippi, and raised in Sardis.

Pride began rapping while he was in college. He later rose to stardom after he released his hit single "Painting Pictures", which went viral on TikTok. The song was taken down by major platforms temporarily due to a copyrighted sample but the issue was resolved. After spending almost three years behind bars awaiting trial for the alleged murder of his barber. On August 26th, 2026, Pride was released on bail while awaiting trial. Same day he posted a video to his YouTube channel titled “First Day Out” amassing over 100,000 views within twenty-four hours.

== Legal issues ==
On July 24, 2023, Pride was charged with first-degree murder for the shooting of 40-year-old Marcus Wheatley, who was Pride's barber. He was denied bail in pretrial detention.

On August 26, 2026, Pride was seemingly released from jail, as he posted a selfie on Instagram and released a single titled "First Day Out", which was accompanied with a music video where he's seen outside of jail in civilian clothing.

== Discography ==
=== Albums ===
Title	EP details	Peak chart positions
Title	EP details	US
MAMA DON'T WORRY	Released: December 25, 2023; Label: Self-released; Format: LP, Digital download, streaming	—

=== Extended plays ===
Title	EP details	Peak chart positions
Title	EP details	US
5lbs of Pressure	Released: October 20, 2022; Label: Self-released; Format: Digital download, streaming	195

=== Mixtapes ===
Title	Album details
G.E.D.	Released: July 4, 2024; Label: Self-released; Format: Digital download, streaming

=== Singles ===
List of singles, with year released, selected chart positions, and album name shown
Title	Year	Peak chart positions										Certifications	Album
Title	Year	US	US R&B/HH	AUS	CAN	IRE	NLD	NZ	SWI	UK	WW	Certifications	Album
"What's Next"	2023	—	—	—	—	—	—	—	—	—	—		Non-album single
"Painting Pictures"	2023	25	9	20	28	19	87	6	50	33	30	RIAA: Gold	5lbs of Pressure
