= Patrick Shegog =

American football player

South Panola Tigers
- Title: Quarterbacks coach

Personal information
- Born: Batesville, Mississippi, U.S.
- Listed height: 6 ft 0 in (1.83 m)
- Listed weight: 200 lb (91 kg)

Career information
- Position: Quarterback (No. 7)
- High school: South Panola (Batesville, Mississippi)
- College: Delta State (2018–2023)

Career history
- Southaven HS (2024) Quarterbacks coach; South Panola HS (2025–present) Quarterbacks coach

Awards and highlights
- Conerly Trophy (2023); 2× GSC Offensive Player of the Year (2022, 2023); 2× First-team All-GSC (2022, 2023)
- Stats at ESPN

Patrick Shegog is an American former college football quarterback who played for the Delta State Statesmen.

== Early life ==
Shegog lettered in football and basketball at South Panola High School in Batesville, Mississippi.

== College career ==
Shegog played college football for the Delta State Statesmen from 2018 to 2023. He played in 10 games, starting eight, his freshman year in 2018, completing 168 of 268 passes for 1,722 yards, 10 touchdowns and 11 interceptions. He was named the Gulf South Conference (GSC) Co-Offensive Freshman of the Year. In 2019, Shegog started the first three games of the season, completing 35 of 65 passes for 352 yards, two touchdowns and one interception before suffering a season-ending broken collarbone. The 2020 season was cancelled due to the COVID-19 pandemic. He completed 139 of 233 passes for 1,614 yards, 10 touchdowns and eight interceptions in 2021 while also rushing for 225 yards and two touchdowns. In 2022, he completed 213 of 329 passes for 2,789 yards, 22 touchdowns and nine interceptions while also running for 790 yards and 17 touchdowns, earning First Team All-GSC and GSC Offensive Player of the Year honors. In 2023, Shegog completed 62 percent of his passes for 2,618 yards, 32 touchdowns and two interceptions while also rushing for 690 yards and 12 touchdowns, garnering First Team All-GSC and GSC Offensive Player of the Year recognition. He also won the Conerly Trophy in 2023 as the best college football player in Mississippi, the first non-Football Bowl Subdivision (FBS) player to win the award since Juan Joseph in 2008. Shegog passed for career totals of 9,095 yards, 76 touchdowns, and 31 interceptions while also rushing for career totals of 2,399 yards and 36 touchdowns.

Pre-draft measurables
Height	Weight	Arm length	Hand span	Wingspan	40-yard dash	10-yard split	20-yard split	20-yard shuttle	Three-cone drill	Broad jump
5 ft 11 in (1.80 m)	198 lb (90 kg)	29 1/8 in (0.74 m)	9 3/8 in (0.24 m)	6 ft 1 1/2 in (1.87 m)	4.89 s	1.65 s	2.83 s	4.52 s	7.32 s	9 ft 4 in (2.84 m)
All values from Pro Day

Shegog went undrafted in the 2024 NFL draft.

== Coaching career ==
In 2024, Shegog became the quarterbacks coach at Southaven High School in Southaven, Mississippi.
