= Gabe Jackson =

American football player (born 1991)

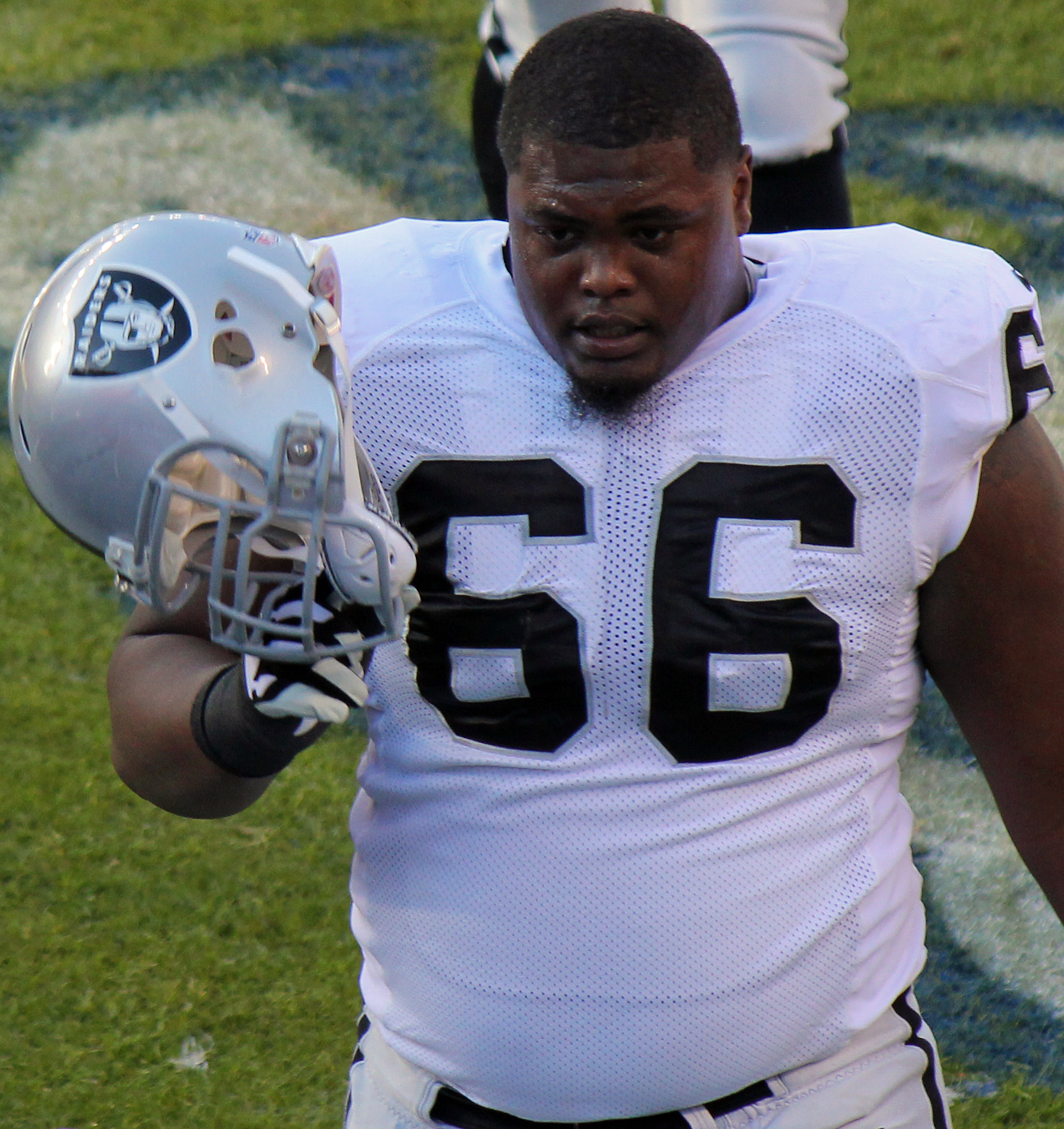
- Jackson with the Oakland Raiders in 2014

No. 66, 69
- Position: Guard

Personal information
- Born: July 12, 1991 (age 35); Liberty, Mississippi, U.S.
- Listed height: 6 ft 3 in (1.91 m)
- Listed weight: 335 lb (152 kg)

Career information
- High school: Amite County (Liberty)
- College: Mississippi State (2009–2013)
- NFL draft: 2014: 3rd round, 81st overall pick

Career history
- Oakland / Las Vegas Raiders (2014–2020); Seattle Seahawks (2021–2022); Carolina Panthers (2023)

Awards and highlights
- Conerly Trophy (2013); Kent Hull Trophy (2013); 2× First-team All-SEC (2012, 2013); Second-team All-SEC (2011)

Career NFL statistics
- Games played: 136
- Games started: 132
- Stats at Pro Football Reference

Gabriel C. Jackson (born July 12, 1991) is an American former professional football player who was a guard in the National Football League (NFL). He was selected by the Oakland Raiders in the third round of the 2014 NFL draft. He played college football for the Mississippi State Bulldogs.

== Early life ==
A native of Liberty, Mississippi, Jackson attended Amite County High School, where he was coached by his father Charles Jackson and started both ways at tackle since his freshman season. Until after his junior year, he was teammates with offensive lineman James Brown and linebacker Damien Wilson. Following his senior season, Jackson was rated with the top 40 high school prospects in the state of Mississippi by the Jackson Clarion-Ledger.

Regarded as a three-star recruit by Rivals.com, Jackson was ranked as the No. 91 offensive tackle prospect in the class of 2009, which was headed by D. J. Fluker and Mason Walters. He drew limited interest from several Southeastern Conference (SEC) schools, as well as from Southern Miss, and eventually signed with Mississippi State.

== College career ==
After redshirting his initial year at Mississippi State University, Jackson earned the starting spot at left guard, next to All-SEC left tackle Derek Sherrod, prior to the season opener against Memphis. On the season, Jackson posted 40 knockdown blocks and graded out at 80 percent or higher six times. In the Bulldogs’ 24–17 win over Kentucky, he graded out at 93 percent. With running back Vick Ballard, Mississippi State's rushing attack averaged 214.8 yards per game, second-highest in the SEC and 16th in the country. In the 17–14 loss to Auburn, Jackson scored a touchdown after recovering Chris Relf's fumble in the end zone. After the season, Jackson was named to the SEC All-Freshman team.

In his sophomore year, Jackson started all 13 games at left guard, grading out a champion in five games and recorded a team-high 69 takedowns. In the 41–34 loss at Auburn, he notched a season-high nine knockdowns. As a blocker, Jackson helped the 2011 Bulldogs to reach the top 10 in school history for single-season marks in passing touchdowns, passing completions, total yards and first downs. The Bulldogs offensive line, which also featured James Carmon at left tackle, gave up the fifth-fewest sacks in the SEC. Jackson helped pave the way for running back Ballard, who finished fourth in the SEC in rushing. For the first time since 1914, Mississippi State scored 50-plus points twice in the same season.

As a junior, Jackson was a constant fixture at left guard, starting all 13 games and grading out as champion consistently in all but one game. The Bulldogs offensive line gave up the second-fewest sacks in the SEC (29th nationally), while Jackson did not personally give up a sack all season. In the SEC-opener against Auburn, he graded out at 91 percent with six pancake blocks, earning the SEC Offensive Player of the Week. In the nationally televised 41–31 win again Tennessee, Jackson graded out a season-high 95 percent. After the season, he was earned First-team All-SEC honors by the Associated Press and Phil Steele and second-team honors by the SEC Coaches and ESPN.com. Jackson was also named to the Phil Steele and FoxSportsNext All-America Second-team, as well as earning honorable mention All-America honors from Sports Illustrated and Pro Football Weekly.

Jackson entered his senior season as one of the highest rated guards in the country, as he was named 2013 preseason All-American by Athlon Sports and Phil Steele, and the best offensive lineman in the SEC by the Birmingham News. After the Bulldogs' 62–7 win over Troy, Jackson was named as the SEC Offensive Lineman of the Week after recording five pancake blocks in helping MSU’s offense roll up 551 yards of offense. In Mississippi State's 59–26 loss against Louisiana State, Jackson held highly regarded defensive tackle Ego Ferguson to only three tackles.

In November 2013, Jackson was named the inaugural winner of the Kent Hull Trophy, awarded to Mississippi’s most outstanding collegiate offensive lineman. He also won the Conerly Trophy as Mississippi's top collegiate player overall, and was named first-team All-SEC.

== Professional career ==
=== Pre-draft ===
Jackson was regarded as one of the best interior offensive linemen for the 2014 NFL draft. Jackson looked to become the highest Mississippi State offensive lineman selected in the NFL draft since Derek Sherrod in 2011.

Pre-draft measurables
Height	Weight	Arm length	Hand span	40-yard dash	10-yard split	20-yard split	20-yard shuttle	Three-cone drill	Vertical jump	Broad jump	Bench press
6 ft 3 1/4 in (1.91 m)	336 lb (152 kg)	33 3/4 in (0.86 m)	10 in (0.25 m)	5.51 s	1.81 s	3.18 s	4.78 s	8.25 s	29 in (0.74 m)	9 ft 0 in (2.74 m)	30 reps
All values from NFL Combine

=== Oakland / Las Vegas Raiders ===
Jackson was selected by the Oakland Raiders in the third round, 81st overall, of the 2014 NFL draft.

Jackson quickly inserted himself into the starting lineup as a rookie, playing in 13 games with 12 starts at left guard. He continued to be the Raiders starting left guard for the 2015 season, starting all 16 games. In 2016 he moved to right guard and started all 16 games. On June 29, 2017, Jackson signed a five-year, $56 million contract extension with the Raiders.

On November 26, 2017, during Week 12 against the Denver Broncos, Jackson was ejected for pushing an official while Michael Crabtree and Aqib Talib were in a fight.

In 2018, Jackson started 13 games at right guard before suffering an elbow injury in Week 14. He was placed on injured reserve on December 18, 2018.

Jackson was placed on the reserve/COVID-19 list by the team on October 22, 2020, and was activated two days later. In Week 7 against the Tampa Bay Buccaneers, Jackson was ejected after stomping on Bucs' defensive tackle Ndamukong Suh. He was later fined $12,500.

=== Seattle Seahawks ===
On March 21, 2021, Jackson was traded to the Seattle Seahawks for a 2021 fifth-round pick. He was named the starting right guard for the next two seasons.

On March 10, 2023, Jackson was released by the Seahawks.

=== Carolina Panthers ===
On November 29, 2023, the Carolina Panthers signed Jackson to their practice squad. He was signed to the active roster on December 29.
