= Batesville Southwestern Railroad =

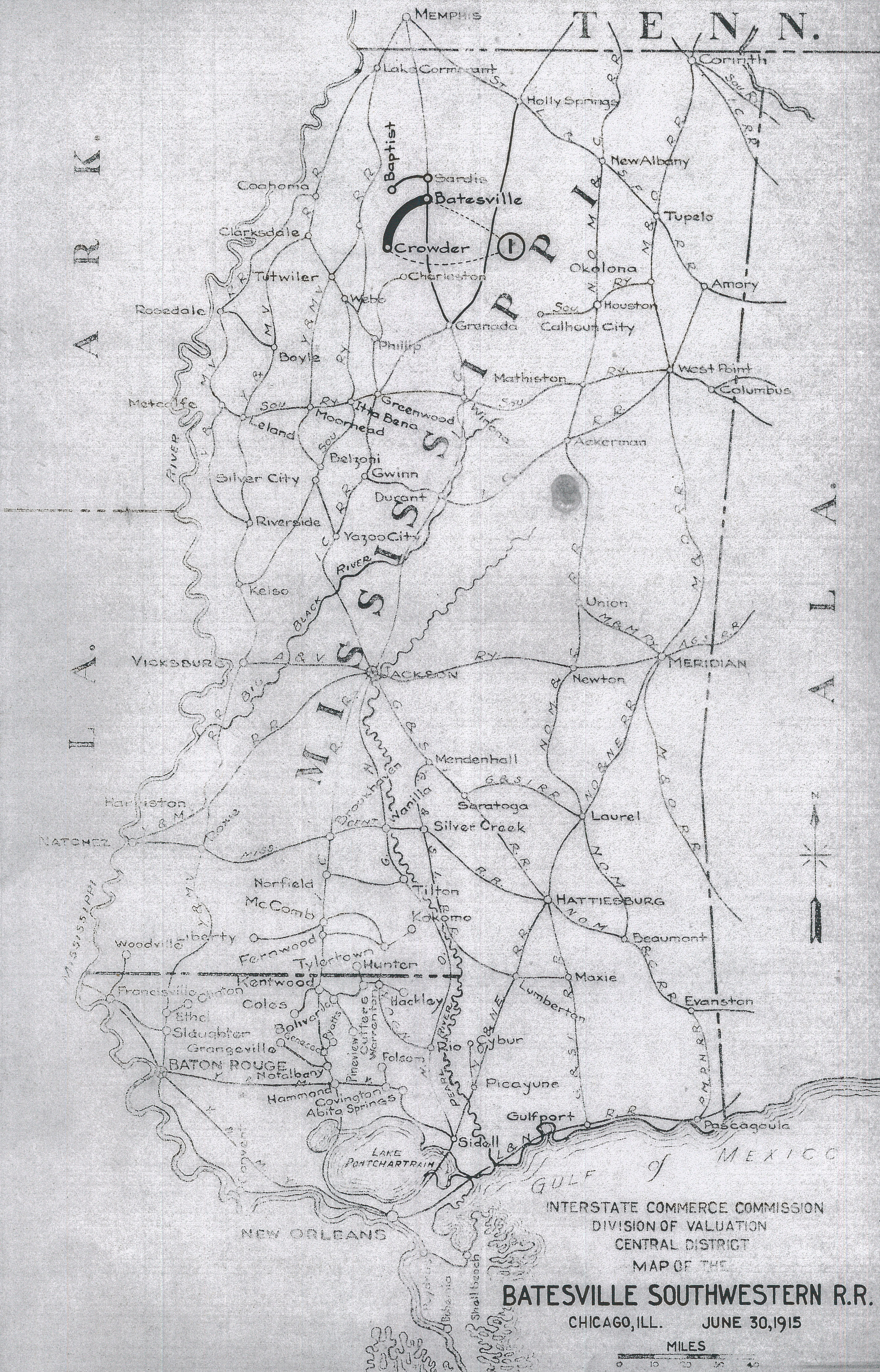
- 1915 map of the railroad

Overview
- Headquarters: Batesville, MS
- Reporting mark: BSW
- Locale: Mississippi
- Dates of operation: 1910–1931

Technical
- Track gauge: 4 ft 8 1/2 in (1,435 mm) standard gauge
- Length: 17 miles (27 km)

The Batesville Southwestern Railroad was a shortline railroad established in 1910 and built jointly by Illinois Central Railroad and R. J. Darnell, a local lumber mill owner. Construction of the line started in 1911 and was completed in 1914. The line extended from Batesville to Crowder and primarily hauled lumber to Darnell's mill. In 1931, the lumber mill closed down and both parties agreed to abandon the line.

A small section of BSW track survives as a siding for Grenada Railway to serve some customers in Batesville. The original right of way can still be made out in places along MS Highway 6.
