= Al Baker (baseball) =

American baseball player (1906–1982)

- Pitcher
- Born: February 28, 1906; Batesville, Mississippi, U.S.
- Died: November 6, 1982 (aged 76); Kenedy, Texas, U.S.
- Batted: Right Threw: Right

MLB debut
- August 20, 1938, for the Boston Red Sox

Last MLB appearance
- August 28, 1938, for the Boston Red Sox

MLB statistics
- Win–loss record: 0–0
- Earned run average: 9.39
- Strikeouts: 2
- Stats at Baseball Reference

Teams
- Boston Red Sox (1938)

Albert Jones Baker (February 28, 1906 – November 6, 1982) was an American Major League Baseball (MLB) pitcher who played for the Boston Red Sox in the 1938 season. He made three relief appearances without a decision and posted a 9.39 earned run average with two strikeouts and two walks in 7 2/3 innings pitched. Baker was born in Batesville, Mississippi, and died in Kenedy, Texas, at the age of 76.
