= Mike Pouncey =

American football player (born 1989)

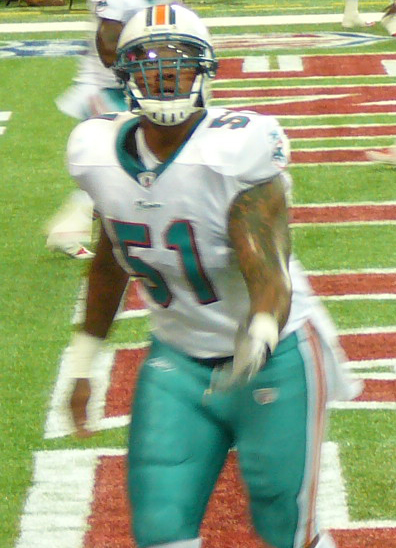
- Pouncey with the Miami Dolphins in 2011

No. 51, 53
- Position: Center

Personal information
- Born: July 24, 1989 (age 37); Ardmore, Oklahoma, U.S.
- Listed height: 6 ft 5 in (1.96 m)
- Listed weight: 298 lb (135 kg)

Career information
- High school: Lakeland (Lakeland, Florida)
- College: Florida (2007–2010)
- NFL draft: 2011: 1st round, 15th overall pick

Career history
- Miami Dolphins (2011–2017); Los Angeles Chargers (2018–2020)

Awards and highlights
- 4× Pro Bowl (2013–2015, 2018); PFWA All-Rookie Team (2011); BCS national champion (2009); 2× First-team All-American (2009, 2010); First-team All-SEC (2009); 2× Second-team All-SEC (2008, 2010)

Career NFL statistics
- Games played: 114
- Games started: 114
- Total tackles: 10
- Stats at Pro Football Reference

James Michael Pouncey (born July 24, 1989) is an American former professional football player who was a center in the National Football League (NFL). He played college football for the Florida Gators, was a member of a BCS National Championship team, and earned All-American honors. He was selected by the Miami Dolphins in the first round of the 2011 NFL draft, and also played for the Los Angeles Chargers. He is the twin brother of former NFL center Maurkice Pouncey.

== Early life ==
Pouncey was born in Ardmore, Oklahoma. He attended Lakeland High School in Lakeland, Florida, where he was a standout lineman for the Lakeland Dreadnaughts high school football team. As a senior in 2006, he helped lead Lakeland High to its third consecutive Florida Class 5A state championship and second straight USA Today national championship.

Considered a four-star recruit by Rivals.com, Pouncey was listed as the No. 16 offensive guard in the nation in 2007. He chose Florida over offers from Florida State, Clemson, Miami, and Michigan.

== College career ==
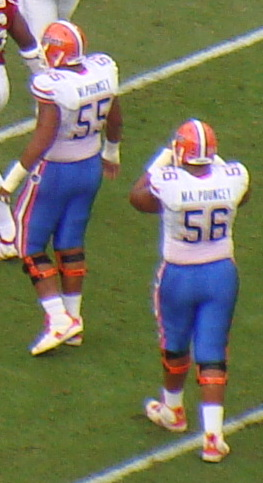
Pouncey (#55) and his twin brother Maurkice Pouncey with the Florida Gators in 2008

Pouncey accepted an athletic scholarship to attend the University of Florida in Gainesville, Florida, where he played for coach Urban Meyer's Florida Gators football team from 2007 to 2010. As a freshman in 2007, he started the season as an offensive lineman but had to move to the defensive line as replacement when several defensive starters were injured.

Pouncey started four of 13 games as a freshman, recording eight tackles and an interception. As a sophomore in 2008, he moved back to the offensive line and started all 14 of the Gators' games at right guard, including the Gators' 24–14 victory over the Oklahoma Sooners in the 2009 BCS National Championship Game.

After his junior season in 2009, Pouncey was named an Associated Press honorable mention All-Southeastern Conference (SEC) selection and a Pro Football Weekly first-team All-American. As a senior team captain in 2010, he moved from guard to center for the Gators, replacing his twin brother Maurkice Pouncey at center, after Maurkice entered the 2010 NFL draft following his junior year.

== Professional career ==
Pre-draft measurables
| Height | Weight | Arm length | Hand span | Wingspan | 40-yard dash | 10-yard split | 20-yard split | 20-yard shuttle | Three-cone drill | Vertical jump | Broad jump | Bench press |
|---|---|---|---|---|---|---|---|---|---|---|---|---|
| 6 ft 5 in (1.96 m) | 303 lb (137 kg) | 32 1/4 in (0.82 m) | 9 3/4 in (0.25 m) | 6 ft 4 5/8 in (1.95 m) | 5.28 s | 1.85 s | 3.07 s | 4.64 s | 7.66 s | 25.0 in (0.64 m) | 8 ft 0 in (2.44 m) | 24 reps |
All values from NFL Combine/Pro Day

=== Miami Dolphins ===
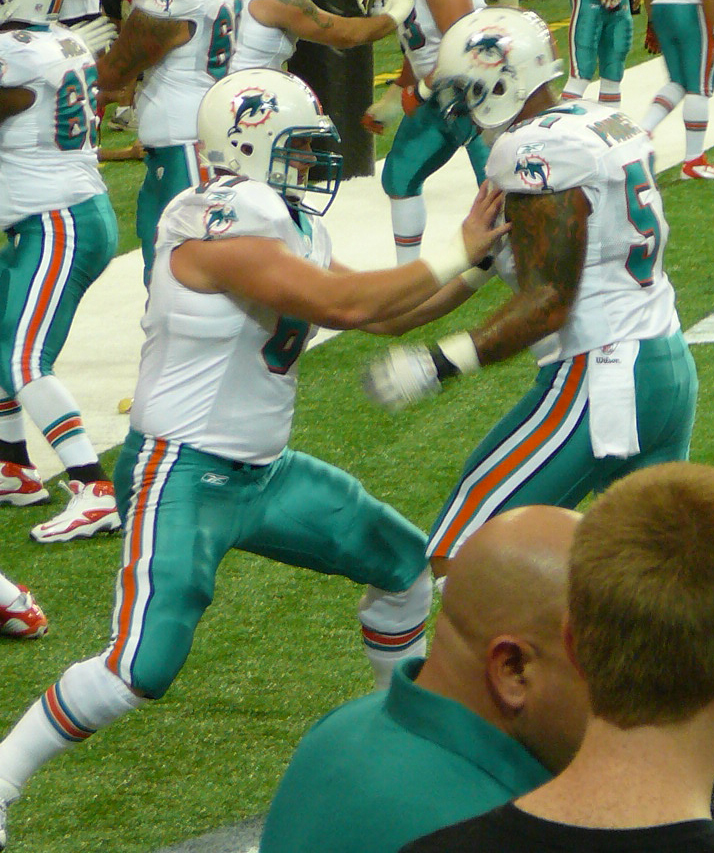
Pouncey (right) works with fellow Dolphins center Joe Berger in 2011.

Pouncey graded out as the top center and guard prospects in the 2011 NFL draft. He was selected by the Miami Dolphins in the first round with the 15th pick overall. He started all 16 regular season games of his rookie season.

In February 2014, the NFL released the "Wells Report" finding that Pouncey, along with Dolphins teammates Richie Incognito and John Jerry, had bullied and harassed lineman Jonathan Martin, another unnamed player, and an assistant trainer. The harassment of the assistant trainer, in which Pouncey took part, included racial insults.

On April 29, 2014, the Dolphins exercised the fifth year option on his rookie contract. Pouncey underwent hip surgery to repair a torn labrum with an expected recovery time of three months on June 23. He would go on to play the entire 2014 season at Guard and was named to his second Pro Bowl, becoming the third Dolphin in team history to earn Pro Bowl honors at two different positions (Cameron Wake, Randy Starks).

On April 10, 2015, Pouncey signed a five-year contract extension with the Dolphins worth $52.15 million with $22 million guaranteed. Pouncey only played in five games in 2016 after dealing with a hip injury before being placed on injured reserve on December 13, 2016.

The Dolphins released Pouncey on March 15, 2018, after he asked the team to release him.

=== Los Angeles Chargers ===
On March 19, 2018, Pouncey signed a two-year, $15 million contract including $10 million fully guaranteed with the Los Angeles Chargers. He started all 16 games at center for the Chargers in 2018, on his way to his fourth Pro Bowl.

On September 3, 2019, Pouncey signed a one-year extension worth $9 million. He was placed on injured reserve on October 9, 2019, with a neck injury.

On September 17, 2020, Pouncey was placed on injured reserve after undergoing season-ending hip surgery.

On February 12, 2021, Pouncey announced his retirement, alongside his brother, after a ten-season career.

== Personal life ==
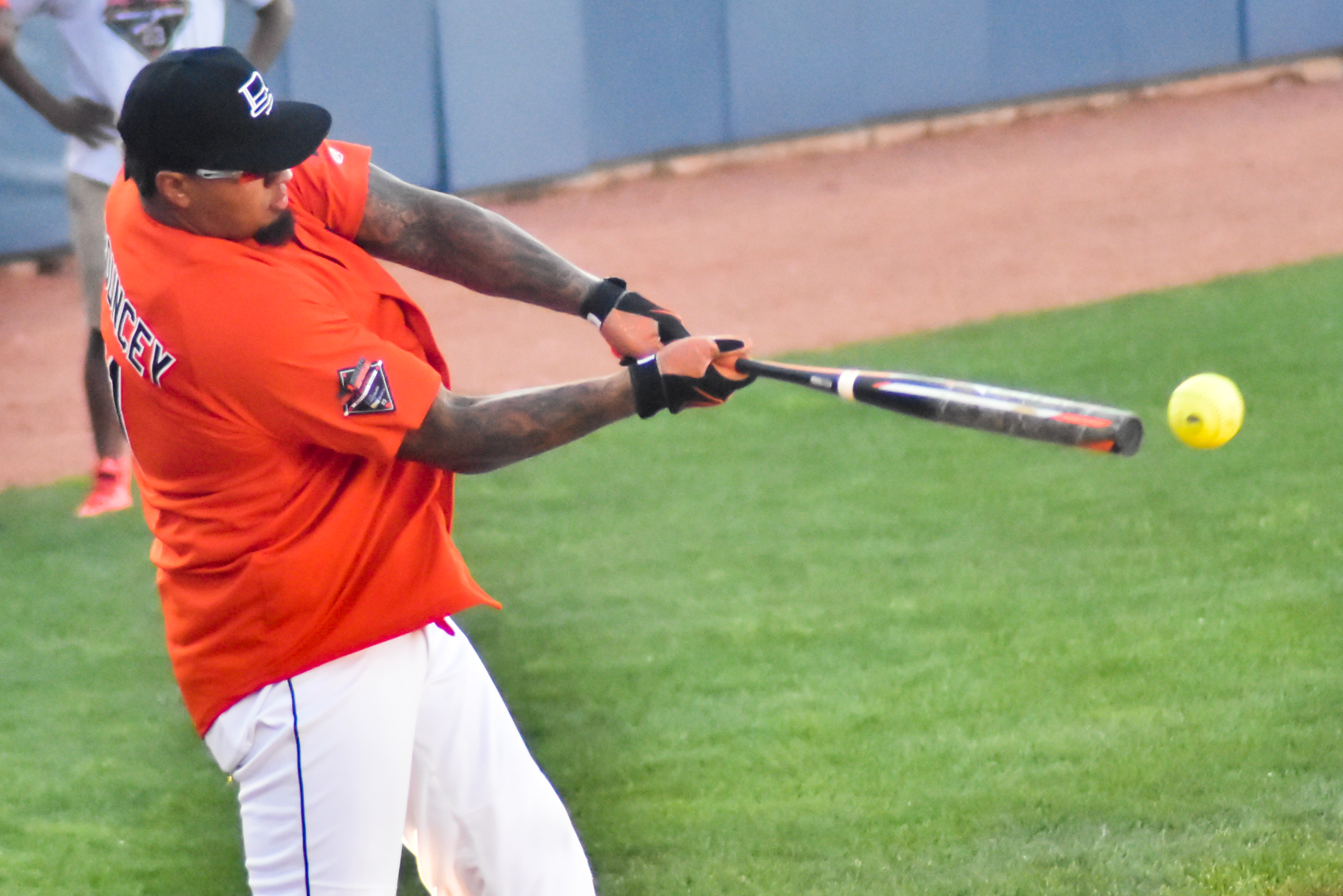
Pouncey participating in a charity softball game in 2015

Pouncey's identical twin brother Maurkice Pouncey was selected 18th overall by the Pittsburgh Steelers in the 2010 NFL draft. He is one minute older than Maurkice. Pouncey has two children: a daughter, Janiyah (born 2008), and a son, Kayden (born 2013).

== See also ==
- 2008 Florida Gators football team
- List of Florida Gators football All-Americans
- List of Florida Gators in the NFL draft
- List of Miami Dolphins first-round draft picks
- List of Miami Dolphins players
