= Lee Woodruff =

American football player (1910–1947)

Profile
- Position: Running back

Personal information
- Born: April 14, 1910; Batesville, Mississippi, U.S.
- Died: February 22, 1947 (aged 37)

Career information
- High school: Batesville (MS)
- College: Mississippi

Career history
- Providence Steam Roller (1931); Boston Braves (1932); Philadelphia Eagles (1933)

Career NFL statistics
- Games played: 27
- Touchdowns: 5
- Stats at Pro Football Reference

Lee Thornton Woodruff (April 14, 1910 – February 22, 1947) was an American professional football running back in the National Football League (NFL) for the Providence Steam Roller, Boston Braves, and Philadelphia Eagles. He was born in Batesville, Mississippi and played college football at the University of Mississippi.
