= David DeCastro =

American football player (born 1990)

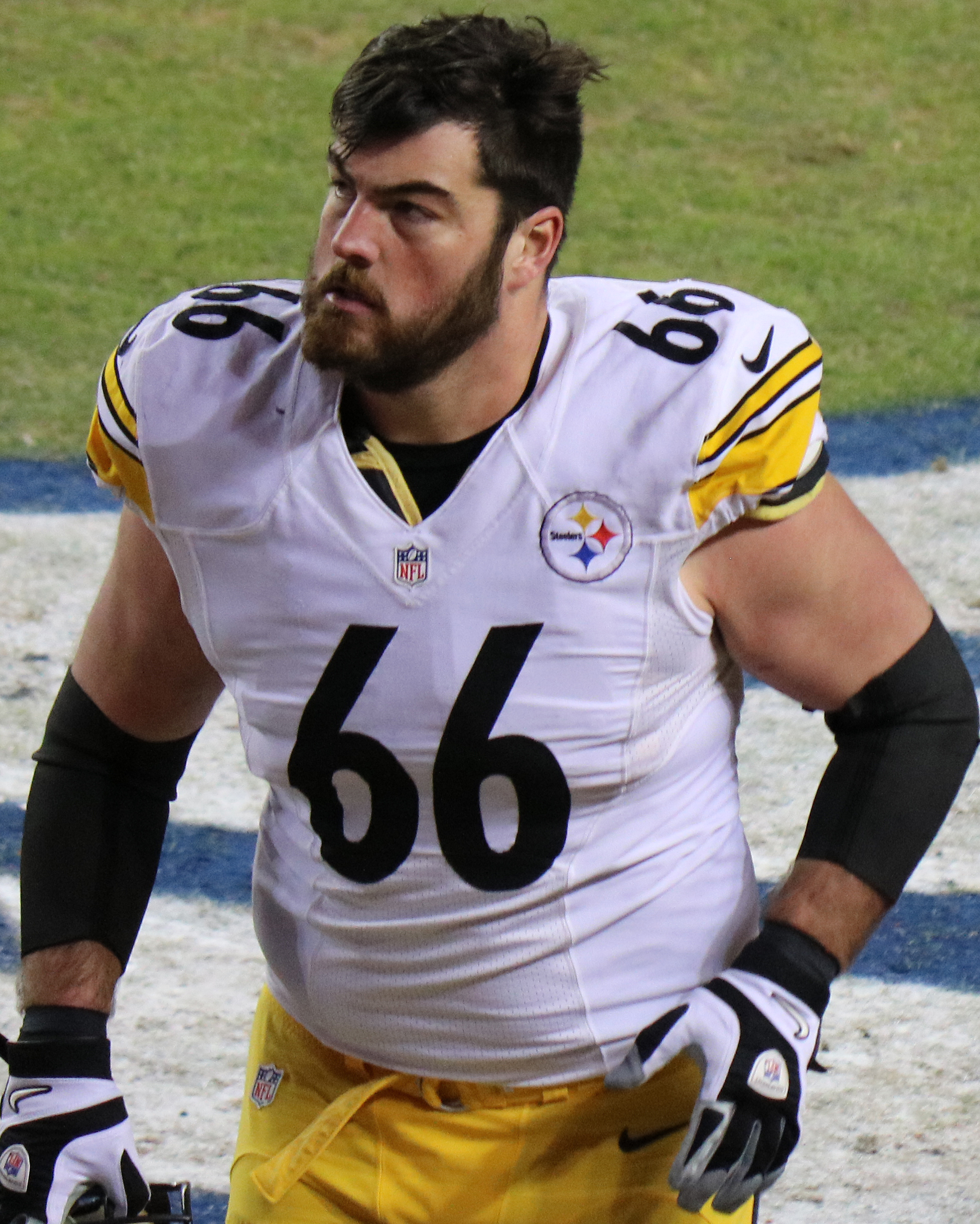
- DeCastro with the Pittsburgh Steelers in 2016

No. 66
- Position: Guard

Personal information
- Born: January 11, 1990 (age 36); Kirkland, Washington, U.S.
- Listed height: 6 ft 5 in (1.96 m)
- Listed weight: 316 lb (143 kg)

Career information
- High school: Bellevue (Bellevue, Washington)
- College: Stanford (2008–2011)
- NFL draft: 2012: 1st round, 24th overall pick

Career history
- Pittsburgh Steelers (2012–2020)

Awards and highlights
- 2× First-team All-Pro (2015, 2017); Second-team All-Pro (2016); 6× Pro Bowl (2015–2020); Unanimous All-American (2011); 2× First-team All-Pac-12 (2010, 2011)

Career NFL statistics
- Games played: 125
- Games started: 124
- Stats at Pro Football Reference

David William DeCastro (born January 11, 1990) is an American former professional football player who was a guard for nine seasons with the Pittsburgh Steelers of the National Football League (NFL). He played college football for the Stanford Cardinal, earning unanimous All-American honors. He was selected by the Pittsburgh Steelers in the first round of the 2012 NFL draft, and he was considered one of the best guard prospects available. He was a six-time Pro Bowl selection with the Steelers.

== Early life ==
DeCastro was born in Kirkland, Washington. Of South African descent, DeCastro grew up in Bellevue and attended Bellevue High School, where he was teammates with Stephen Schilling. He grew up a Seattle Seahawks fan, idolizing Steve Hutchinson.

Also a standout athlete, DeCastro competed for the school's track and field team as a shot putter. He got a top-throw of 17.93 meters at the 2008 Washington 3A-4A State T&F Championship, winning the event. He also competed in the discus (top-throw of 37.24 meters).

Considered a three-star prospect by Rivals.com he was listed as the No. 11 center in the class of 2008. He chose Stanford over offers from Washington, Washington State, and Oregon State.

== College career ==
DeCastro attended Stanford University in Stanford, California, where he was a member of the Stanford Cardinal football team from 2008 to 2011. He did not play in any games as a freshman in 2008. As a redshirt freshman in 2009 he started all 13 games at right guard. He was an honorable mention All-Pac-10 selection and a first-team freshman All-American by College Football News. As a sophomore in 2010, he started all 13 games and was a first-team All-Pac-10 selection. Following his junior season in 2011, he was again a first-team Pac-12 selection, and was recognized as a unanimous first-team All-American. Under head coach David Shaw, the Cardinal finished 11–2 in DeCastro's final season. Afterward, he decided to forgo his final season of college eligibility and enter the NFL Draft.

== Professional career ==
=== Pre-draft ===
In October 2011, Sports Illustrated's Tony Pauline ranked him as the No. 17 prospect on his mid-season draft board. As the season progressed, he solidified his status as a first-round draft pick. He attended the NFL Combine and was said to have "excellent movement skills" and was able to complete all the drills and positional workouts. Although he participated Stanford's pro day, he decided to only do positional drills, as he was satisfied with his combine numbers. He was ranked the best offensive guard by Mike Mayock and NFLDraftScout.com.

Pre-draft measurables
| Height | Weight | Arm length | Hand span | Wingspan | 40-yard dash | 10-yard split | 20-yard split | 20-yard shuttle | Three-cone drill | Vertical jump | Broad jump | Bench press |
|---|---|---|---|---|---|---|---|---|---|---|---|---|
| 6 ft 4 7/8 in (1.95 m) | 316 lb (143 kg) | 32 3/4 in (0.83 m) | 10 in (0.25 m) | 6 ft 7 1/8 in (2.01 m) | 5.43 s | 1.84 s | 3.09 s | 4.56 s | 7.30 s | 29.5 in (0.75 m) | 8 ft 2 in (2.49 m) | 34 reps |
All values from NFL Combine

=== 2012 ===
The Pittsburgh Steelers selected DeCastro in the first round (24th overall) of the 2012 NFL draft. He was the first offensive guard taken in the first round by the Steelers since Kendall Simmons in 2002 and was one of four Stanford players taken in the first two rounds of the 2012 NFL Draft.

On June 23, 2012, the Pittsburgh Steelers signed DeCastro to a four-year, $7.81 million rookie contract that also includes $6.35 million guaranteed and a signing bonus of $4.12 million.

He entered training camp competing for a starting guard position with veterans Willie Colon, Ramon Foster, and Trai Essex.

In the Pittsburgh Steelers' third preseason game against the Buffalo Bills, DeCastro suffered an injury and was forced to leave the game. After DeCastro was carted off the field, Steelers' head coach Mike Tomlin stated that the injury was a "potentially severe" right knee injury. The injury occurred when he was engaged with Bills' defensive tackle Marcell Dareus and had his teammate, offensive tackle Marcus Gilbert, accidentally fell on his right leg. It was discovered that he had suffered a torn collateral lateral ligament and a dislocated kneecap. On November 26, DeCastro was returned to the active roster, while Gilbert was placed on injured reserve. On December 9, 2012, he made his professional regular-season debut in a 24–34 loss at the San Diego Chargers. The next week, he earned his first career start during a Week 15 contest against the Dallas Cowboys. He finished his rookie year starting the last three games of the 2012 NFL season.

=== 2013 ===
With the departure of Willie Colon and Trai Essex, DeCastro entered the season as the Pittsburgh Steelers' de facto starter at right guard. He earned the start for the Steelers' season-opening 16–9 loss to the Tennessee Titans. During the tenth play of the game, DeCastro accidentally whiffed during a cut block and fell down onto the back of Maurkice Pouncey's right knee. Pouncey tore his ACL and was placed on injured-reserve for the remainder of the season. He was replaced by Guy Whimper during the Steelers' Week 9 matchup with the New England Patriots after suffering an ankle injury. He finished the season starting 15 games and was ranked the fifth best right guard by Pro Football Focus, as the Steelers finished 8–8 for the second year in a row.

=== 2014 ===
DeCastro returned in 2014 to complete his first full season after starting all 16 games of the regular season as the Pittsburgh Steelers finished 11–5. On January 3, 2014, he played in his first career postseason game as the Steelers lost in the AFC Wildcard to the Baltimore Ravens.

=== 2015 ===
On April 9, 2015, the Pittsburgh Steelers exercised the fifth-year option on DeCastro's rookie contract, paying him a salary of $8.07 million for 2016. He also received a $3.20 million signing bonus for 2016.

In his fourth season with the Steelers in 2015, DeCastro started in all 16 regular-season games and was elected to his first Pro Bowl. Pro Football Focus gave him an overall grade of 83.4 and ranked him the 15th-best offensive guard in 2015. He was ranked the ninth best offensive guard by Sports Illustrated after he surrendered only 1.5 sacks in 590 pass blocking attempts and was flagged for three penalties (all false starts) all season.

=== 2016 ===
On September 8, 2016, the Steelers signed DeCastro to an additional five-year, $50 million extension. The contract includes a signing bonus of $16 million. Together, both extensions bring his present contract to a six-year, $58.07 million deal including a total signing bonus of $16.00 million and signs him throughout 2021.

He started all 16 regular season games and brought his consecutive games played streak to 56 in-a-row. The Pittsburgh Steelers finished first in the AFC North after achieving an 11–5 record in 2016. They went on to defeat the Miami Dolphins in the AFC Wildcard, the Kansas City Chiefs in the AFC Divisional, and lost the AFC Championship to the New England Patriots. The Pittsburgh Steelers offensive line was ranked the third best by Pro Football Focus, with DeCastro being ranked as the Steelers' top run blocker. He was named to his second-straight Pro Bowl for the 2016 season. He was also ranked 97th on the NFL Top 100 Players of 2017.

=== 2017 ===
On December 19, 2017, DeCastro was named to his third-straight Pro Bowl along with fellow Steeler offensive linemen Alejandro Villanueva and Maurkice Pouncey. He was ranked 44th by his peers on the NFL Top 100 Players of 2018. DeCastro started and played in the first 15 games of the season and skipped week 17's game against the Cleveland Browns because the Steelers' had clinched a playoff berth.

=== 2018 ===
In week 1 against the Cleveland Browns, DeCastro fractured his right hand and was forced to miss the next two games against the Kansas City Chiefs and Tampa Bay Buccaneers. He was able to play again in week 4 against the Baltimore Ravens.

DeCastro started and played in 14 games during the regular season. On December 18, 2018, DeCastro was selected to play in his fourth straight Pro Bowl. He received an overall grade of 71.7 from Pro Football Focus in 2018, which ranked as the 11th highest grade among all qualifying offensive guards.

=== 2019 ===
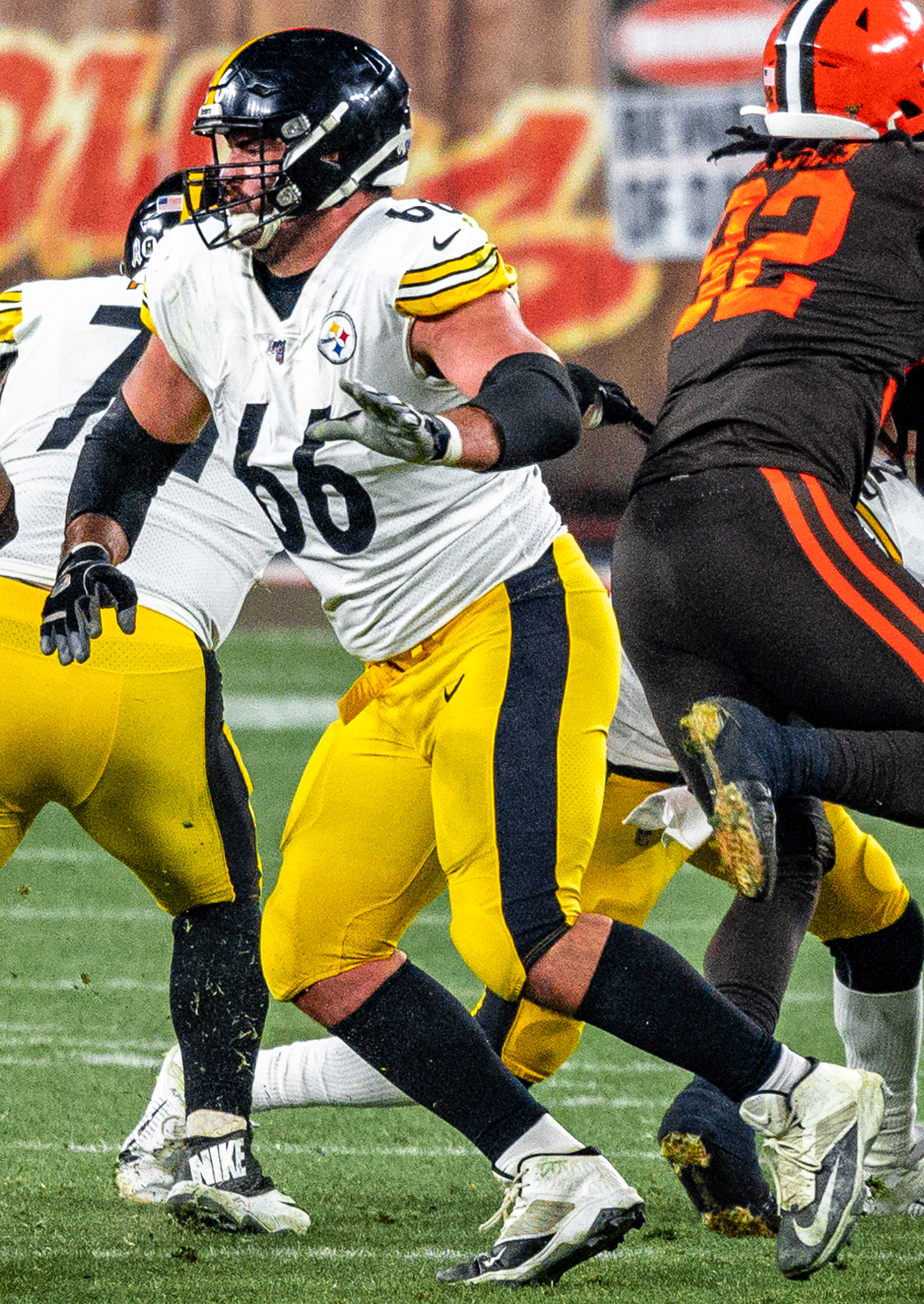
David DeCastro in a game against the Cleveland Browns

In week 11 against the Cleveland Browns, Browns' defensive end Myles Garrett hit Steelers' quarterback Mason Rudolph on the head with Rudolph's helmet. Afterwards, DeCastro grabbed Garrett, pushed him onto the ground, and laid on top of him to prevent an even larger fight from escalating. After the game, Garrett himself praised DeCastro for his actions. The next day, it was announced that DeCastro would not be suspended for his actions in the brawl.

DeCastro started and played in all 16 games during the regular season. On December 17, 2019, DeCastro was selected to play in his fifth straight Pro Bowl.

DeCastro was released by the Steelers on June 24, 2021.
