= C. Augustus Martin =

American scholar (born circa 1955)

Clarence Augustus "Gus" Martin (born circa 1955) is an American scholar who specializes in terrorism and juvenile justice. He is currently a professor at California State University, Dominguez Hills. He is the father of former National Football League player Jonathan Martin. He graduated from Harvard University, Duquesne University, and University of Pittsburgh.

== Published works ==
- (2012) Understanding Terrorism: Challenges, Perspectives, and Issues Sage ISBN 978-1452205823
- (2010) Terrorism and Homeland Security Sage ISBN 978-1412988025
- (2010) Essentials of Terrorism: Concepts and Controversies Sage ISBN 978-1412980265
- (2005) Juvenile Justice: Process and Systems Sage ISBN 978-0761930822
- (2004) The New Era of Terrorism: Selected Readings Sage ISBN 978-0761988731
