= Painting Pictures (song) =

2022 single by Superstar Pride

Single by Superstar Pride

from the EP 5lbs of Pressure
- Released: March 15, 2023
- Recorded: 2022
- Genre: Hip hop
- Length: 2:02
- Songwriter: Cadarrius Pride
- Producers: StunnaMade; Global Knockz

Music video
- "Painting Pictures" on YouTube

"Painting Pictures" is a song by American rapper Superstar Pride from his EP 5lbs of Pressure, released on October 19, 2022. The song contains a sample of "Soon as I Get Home" by Faith Evans and was produced by StunnaMade. The song went viral through the video-sharing platform TikTok in 2023, following which it became Superstar Pride's breakout hit and first song to enter the Billboard Hot 100. It was released as his debut single on March 15, 2023.

== Composition ==
In the song, Superstar Pride primarily raps about his family history and connection to street life, as he praises his mother for the way she raised him ("Mama, don't worry, you raised a gangster, I'm a survivor"). He also criticizes a woman who claims he impregnated her.

== Release and promotion ==
First released independently in October 2022, "Painting Pictures" received widespread exposure through TikTok, beginning when Superstar Pride posted a clip of himself performing it and also sporting a distinct haircut, in February 2023. The song has since soundtracked in many TikTok videos which recreate his performance and poke fun at his haircut; Superstar has said he finds them "hilarious". In February, having been used in over 38,000 videos on TikTok and reached over four million official streams in the United States, the song began to chart, soon becoming Superstar's first Top 25 hit in March 2023. At the height of its popularity, it was briefly removed from streaming services due to sample clearance issues. According to Steve Stoute, the CEO of the Translation marketing agency, rapper and Bad Boy Records founder Sean Combs, who co-wrote and co-produced "Soon as I Get Home", met Superstar, "loved him" and subsequently cleared up the sample, allowing it to return to streaming platforms. The song was then released as the lead single from 5lbs of Pressure on March 15, 2023 along with a music video.

== Commercial performance ==
"Painting Pictures" debuted on Billboard Hot 100 at number 99 on February 22, 2023, concurrently with a peak of number 38 on Hot R&B/Hip-Hop Songs. It ascended to number 25 on the Billboard Hot 100 in the week dated March 11, 2023. The song has been certified gold by the Recording Industry Association of America (RIAA).

== Music video ==
The official music video was directed by GlobalKnockz, one of the producers of the song. It shows Superstar Pride surrounded by pictures, some of which he has framed himself, and painting ones as well.

== Charts ==
=== Weekly charts ===
Weekly chart performance for "Painting Pictures"
Chart (2023)	Peak position
Australia (ARIA)	20
Canadian Hot 100 (Billboard)	28
Global 200 (Billboard)	30
Ireland (IRMA)	19
Netherlands (Single Top 100)	87
New Zealand (Recorded Music NZ)	6
Sweden Heatseeker (Sverigetopplistan)	14
Switzerland (Schweizer Hitparade)	50
UK Singles (Official Charts)	33
UK Hip Hop/R&B (Official Charts)	20
US Billboard Hot 100 (Billboard)	25
US Hot R&B/Hip-Hop Songs (Billboard)	9
US Rhythmic (Billboard)	29

=== Year-end charts ===
Year-end chart performance for "Painting Pictures"
Chart (2023)	Position
US Hot R&B/Hip-Hop Songs (Billboard)	50

== Certifications ==
Certifications for "Painting Pictures"
Region	Certification	Certified units/sales
United States (RIAA)	Gold	500,000^{‡}
^{‡} Sales+streaming figures based on certification alone.
