= Bills–Jets rivalry =

National Football League cross-state rivalry in New York

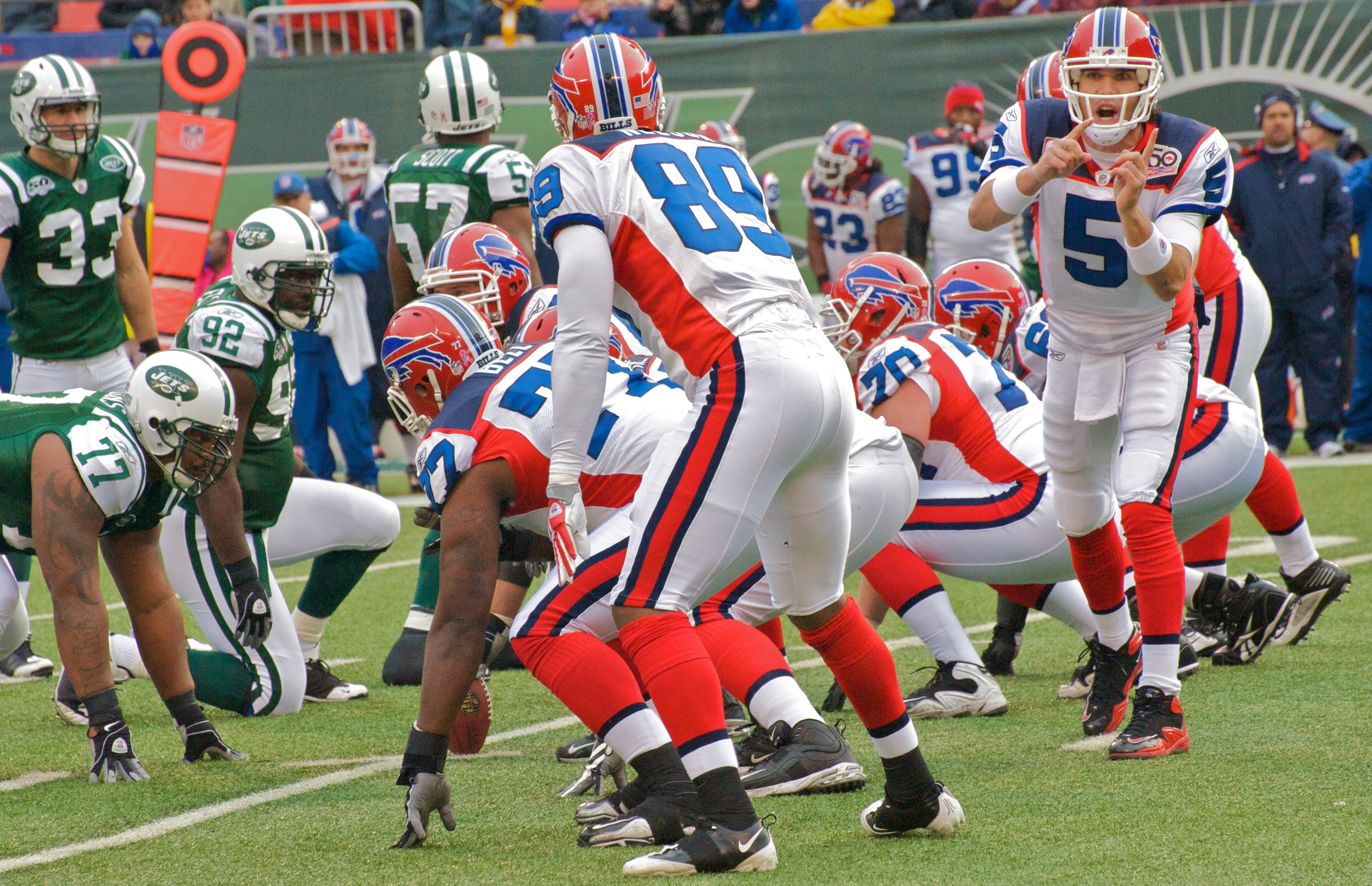
- Bills and Jets face off during the 2009 season.

- Buffalo Bills New York Jets
- Location: Buffalo, New York City
- First meeting: September 11, 1960; Titans 27, Bills 3
- Latest meeting: November 15, 2026; Bills 31, Jets 12
- Next meeting: January 9/10, 2027
- Stadiums: Bills: Highmark Stadium; Jets: MetLife Stadium

Statistics
- Total meetings: 132
- All-time series: Bills: 74–58
- Regular season series: Bills: 73–58
- Postseason results: Bills: 1–0
- Largest victory: Bills: 37–0 (1989); Jets: 42–3 (1985)
- Most points scored: Bills: 46 (1979); Jets: 48 (2012)
- Longest win streak: Bills: 10 (1987–1992); Jets: 7 (1984–1987)
- Current win streak: Bills: 6 (2023–present)

Post-season history
- 1981 AFC Wild Card: Bills won: 31–27

The Bills–Jets rivalry is a National Football League (NFL) rivalry between the Buffalo Bills and New York Jets.

Both of these teams play in the same division (AFC East) and as a result, play two scheduled games each season. Both teams represent New York State, with the Bills having their primary fan base in Western New York, and the Jets in the New York City area (the Jets moved to New Jersey in 1984, having originally played in New York).

This rivalry is fueled primarily by the differences between the greater New York City metropolitan area and the rest of New York State, but also by the Bills being the only team physically located in New York due to the Jets and their NFC counterparts the Giants playing their games in the New Jersey suburbs of New York City. However, the two teams have rarely been successful at the same time, and as such, their rivalry usually lacks the intensity that is present in other rivalries, such as the Bills' rivalry with the Dolphins and the Jets' with the Patriots. There have only been four seasons in which both the Bills and Jets finished with winning records. Regardless, the two teams share a bond due to this seeming inability to field winning teams simultaneously, having been the two NFL teams coached by Rex Ryan, and their long histories playing twice yearly against one another going back to the first days of the AFL.

The Bills lead the overall series, 74–58. The two teams have met once in the playoffs, with the Bills winning.

== Notable moments ==
=== 1960–1999: Early history ===
There were a handful of memorable games in the early history of this rivalry. The Bills and Jets (then known as the Titans) played each other in what was the inaugural game for both franchises in 1960. During the Jets' Super Bowl winning year in 1968, the Bills defense intercepted Joe Namath five times, including three pick-sixes, as Buffalo upset the Jets 37–35 for its only win that year. In 1973, O. J. Simpson eclipsed Jim Brown's rushing yards record to surpass 2,000 yards in a 34–6 Bills win. Eight years later, the teams played their only playoff game together. In the 1981 AFC wild card game, the Bills had a 24–0 lead early in the game, but the Jets came back, cutting their deficit to 31–24. A late game interception of Richard Todd sealed the win for the Bills, however.

In the quarterback-rich 1983 NFL draft, the Bills selected quarterback Jim Kelly whereas the Jets infamously passed on Dan Marino in favor of Ken O'Brien. Despite Kelly not joining the Bills until 1986, as he played in the United States Football League instead until it ceased operations, his Bills tenure eventually saw a period of dominance over the Jets in the late 1980s and early 1990s. Kelly's first game against the Jets is remembered for a bench-clearing fist fight, as referee Ben Dreith famously penalized Jets defender Marty Lyons for "giving [Kelly] the business".

The Jets and Bills played two regular season games with playoff implications in the 1990s. The 1993 season saw the Jets failing to secure a playoff berth by losing a game to the Bills via three missed field goals. In 1998, the Jets secured their first ever AFC East division title by beating the Bills.

=== 2000–2017 ===
As the 2000s approached, Buffalo collapsed from a perennial Super Bowl contender to one of the worst teams in the league, while the Jets maintained a level of success, making the playoffs 5 times despite a period of dominance by the Tom Brady-led New England Patriots. However, the Bills finally ended their league-leading playoff drought in 2017, while the Jets have yet to return to the playoffs since last qualifying in 2010.

In 2008, the Bills were coming off a 5–1 start, but lost 8 of their remaining ten games to finish 7–9 and out of the playoffs. Two of those losses came against the Jets; the latter included a J. P. Losman fumble returned for the Jets' game-winning touchdown as the Bills were trying to run out the clock.

==== 2009–2016: the Rex Ryan era ====
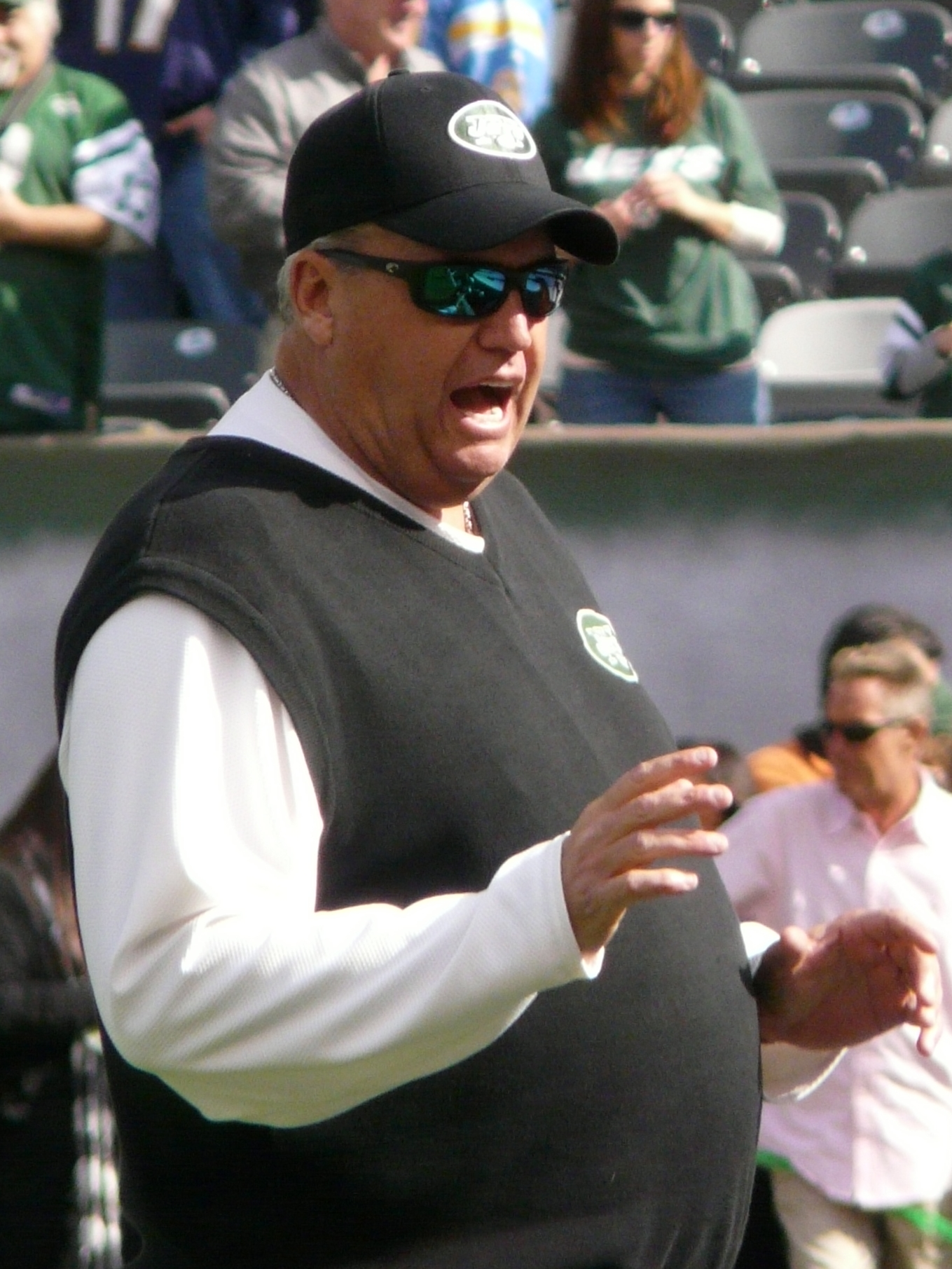
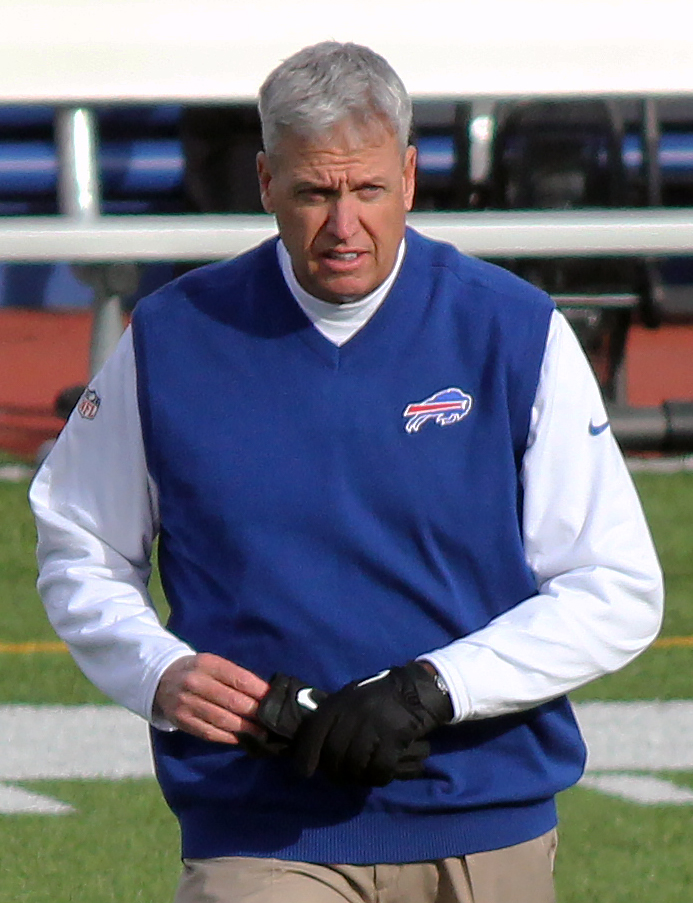
Rex Ryan coached both the Jets (top) and the Bills (bottom).

In 2009, the first year of Rex Ryan's six-year tenure as the Jets' head coach, Mark Sanchez threw 5 interceptions to the Bills defense, losing a game in overtime for the Jets in which they rushed for 318 yards. Later that year, the Jets rematched the Bills in Toronto as part of the Bills Toronto Series, in which the Jets avenged their loss with a 19–13 win that kept their playoff hopes alive.

During the 2013 NFL draft, the Bills and Jets once again selected quarterbacks with their early picks. EJ Manuel was picked by Buffalo in the first round while Geno Smith was chosen in the second round by the Jets. Ultimately, neither quarterback panned out and both were gone from their teams after 2016.

In 2014, the second Bills–Jets game was played at Ford Field in Detroit due to a freak snowstorm in Buffalo. The Bills won 38–3.

The 2015 offseason saw some notable personnel swaps between the teams. On January 12, Rex Ryan was hired as the head coach of the Bills shortly after his dismissal by the Jets, serving as Buffalo's head coach for the next two years. In addition, the Jets hired former Bills head coach Chan Gailey as their offensive coordinator and traded for former Bills starting quarterback Ryan Fitzpatrick who later became their own starter. The Bills also added former Jets Percy Harvin and IK Enemkpali, the latter one day after he was released for breaking Geno Smith's jaw in a locker room altercation. The Bills won both games in 2015, knocking the Jets out of playoff contention with their second win. Tensions arose during the first game on Thursday Night Football when both teams were still in the hunt for a playoff spot, especially after Ryan made Enemkpali a team captain for that game. Despite Ryan's short tenure as the Bills' coach and firing before the second Bills-Jets matchup of 2016, his presence on the Bills briefly re-energized the rivalry.

=== 2018–present: the Josh Allen era ===
In the 2018 NFL draft, the Bills and Jets each traded up in order to select a highly touted quarterback. This resulted in Sam Darnold landing with the Jets 3rd overall and Josh Allen being selected by the Bills 7th overall. Allen and Darnold met on the field for the first time as rivals on December 9, 2018, with both having missed the first Bills–Jets match-up that year due to injury. The Bills jumped to an early 14–3 lead under Allen, but the Jets fought back with good special teams play to set up short fields and tied the game at 20 by the fourth quarter. After the Bills scored a field goal to retake the lead with just over two minutes to go, Darnold led a game-winning drive for the Jets, including a 37-yard pass to Robby Anderson to set up the go-ahead touchdown run by Elijah McGuire.

On September 8, 2019, the Bills overcame a 16–0 third quarter deficit and four turnovers to beat the Jets 17–16 at MetLife Stadium on opening day of the season. The Jets unraveled after losing linebacker C. J. Mosley to injury and were also hampered by ineffective placekicking from Kaare Vedvik. The momentum would carry over as Buffalo wound up making the playoffs while New York was unable to overcome a 1–7 start, despite both teams being expected to be competitive that year. Having clinched a playoff spot by then, the Bills rested several starters during the week 17 rematch, which the Jets won 13–6.

The second Bills–Jets matchup of the 2020 season was noteworthy as the then-winless Jets held a potent Bills offense out of the endzone, but Buffalo still prevailed 18–10 thanks to six field goals by rookie kicker Tyler Bass. Not only did the Bills sweep the yearly series, but the franchises had nearly exact opposite years with the Bills finishing 13–3 but the Jets just 2–14 to begin the new decade, continuing a long general trend of the two teams being unable to be simultaneously successful. Allen had his best season thus far with a 107.2 passer rating and 37 touchdowns, while Darnold had his worst with a 72.7 rating and just 9 touchdowns in 12 games. The Jets traded Darnold to the Carolina Panthers following the season, drafting Zach Wilson to replace him.

After Allen and the Bills swept the Jets in 2021, the Wilson-led Jets won the first matchup in 2022, as a 6-minute-long drive that started at New York's 4-yard line set up the game winning field goal. With under 2 minutes left, the Bills were unable to respond, as a holding penalty against tackle Dion Dawkins and a strip sack of Allen that left him injured caused the Bills to turn the ball over on downs, allowing a 20–17 Jets upset win over the heavily-favored Bills. This game was the first time since 2011 that both teams met with winning records. By the time of the rematch, Wilson had been benched for Mike White, who had started one game against Buffalo the previous year, and the Jets were in the middle of what would become a six-game losing streak to end the year out of playoff contention while the Bills were in the middle of a seven-game winning streak to end the year. Just as in his previous start against Buffalo, White struggled and was injured during the 20–12 Bills win. During this game, he was knocked out of the game twice, suffering what was later revealed to be broken ribs, but decided to return to the game both times, earning the respect of fans and players from both teams.

The following season, New York traded for longtime Green Bay Packers quarterback Aaron Rodgers, setting up what would become a highly anticipated opening week game between the Bills and Jets on Monday Night Football. Unfortunately, Rodgers ruptured his Achilles tendon on just his fourth play in the game, but the Jets forced Allen to turn the ball over four times, and ended up winning in overtime 22–16 on Xavier Gipson's punt return touchdown. Gipson's next touch against the Bills did not fare as well, as he fumbled the opening kickoff return in the rematch in Buffalo after being tackled by Bills fullback Reggie Gilliam. This sparked a 32–6 Bills victory in what was considered a must-win game for both teams, as the Jets could not contain a refocused Allen and struggled on offense, leading to Zach Wilson being benched again. The game also saw tensions flare between several players, including Micheal Clemons and Dion Dawkins.

== Gallery ==
Oil painting of Bills OG Billy Shaw blocking for Bobby Smith against Jets in 1964

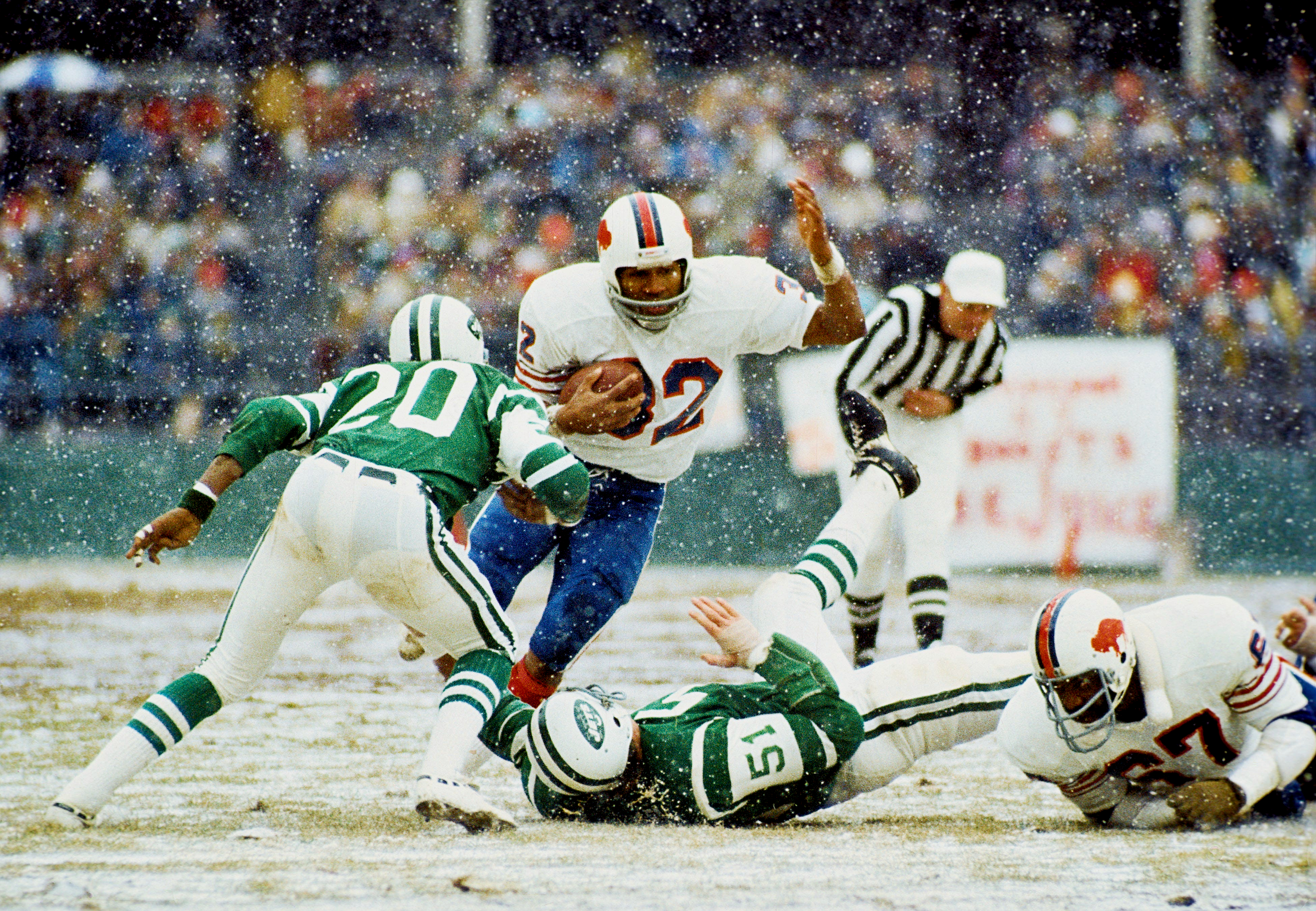
Bills RB O. J. Simpson rushing against Jets in 1973

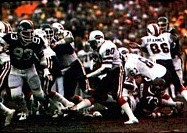
Bills RB Joe Cribbs runs against Jets in 1981 Wild Card game

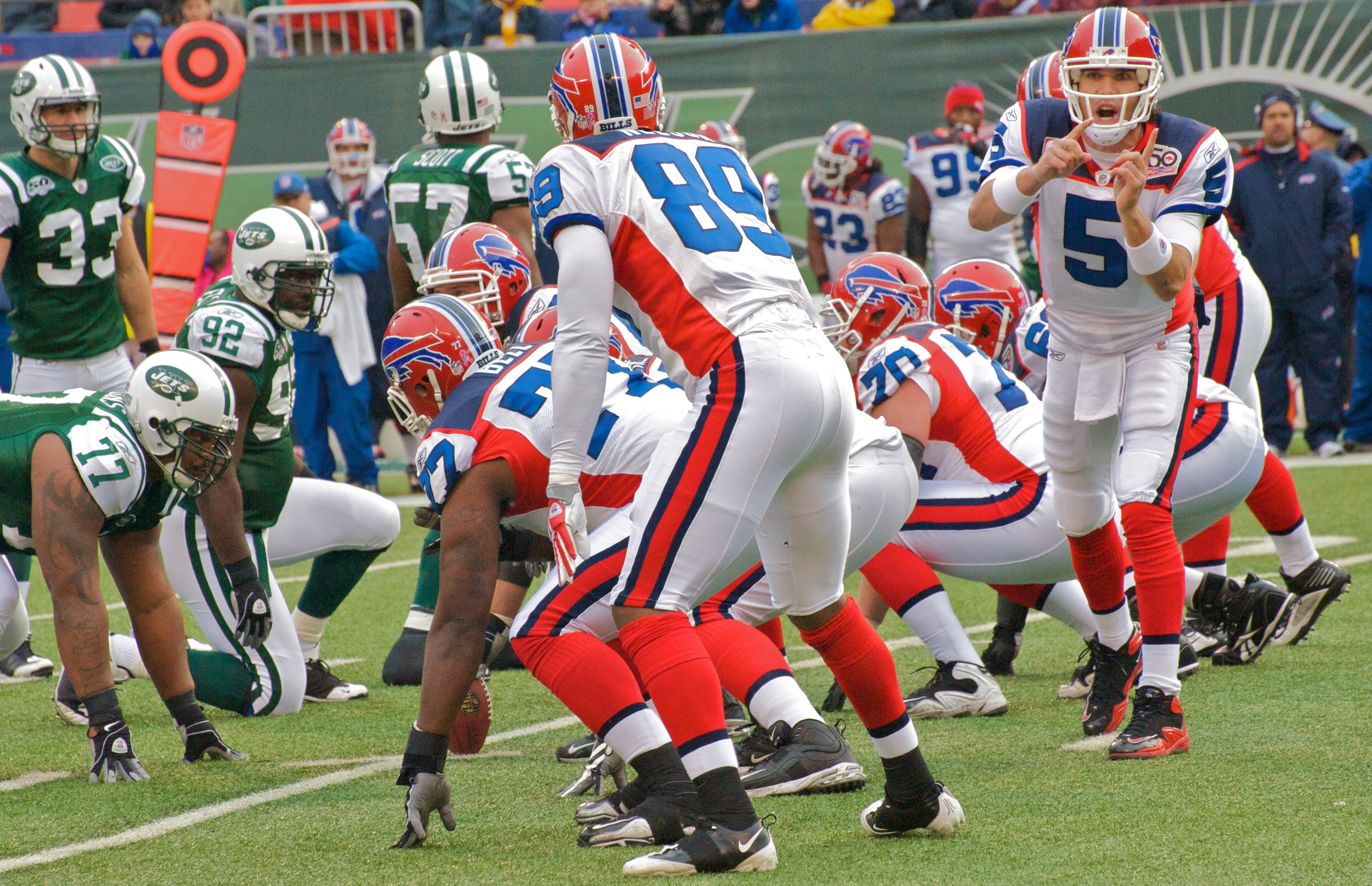
Pre-snap activity between Bills and Jets in 2009

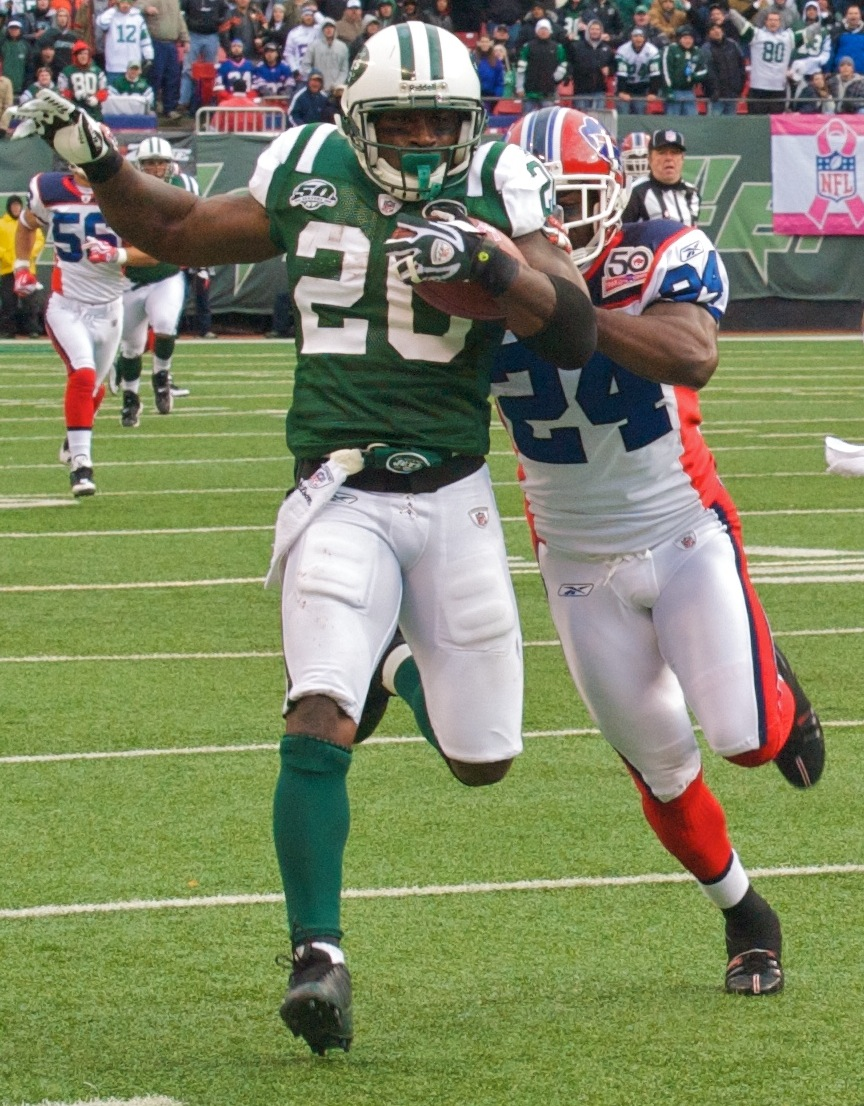
Jets RB Thomas Jones runs for a long touchdown against Bills in 2009

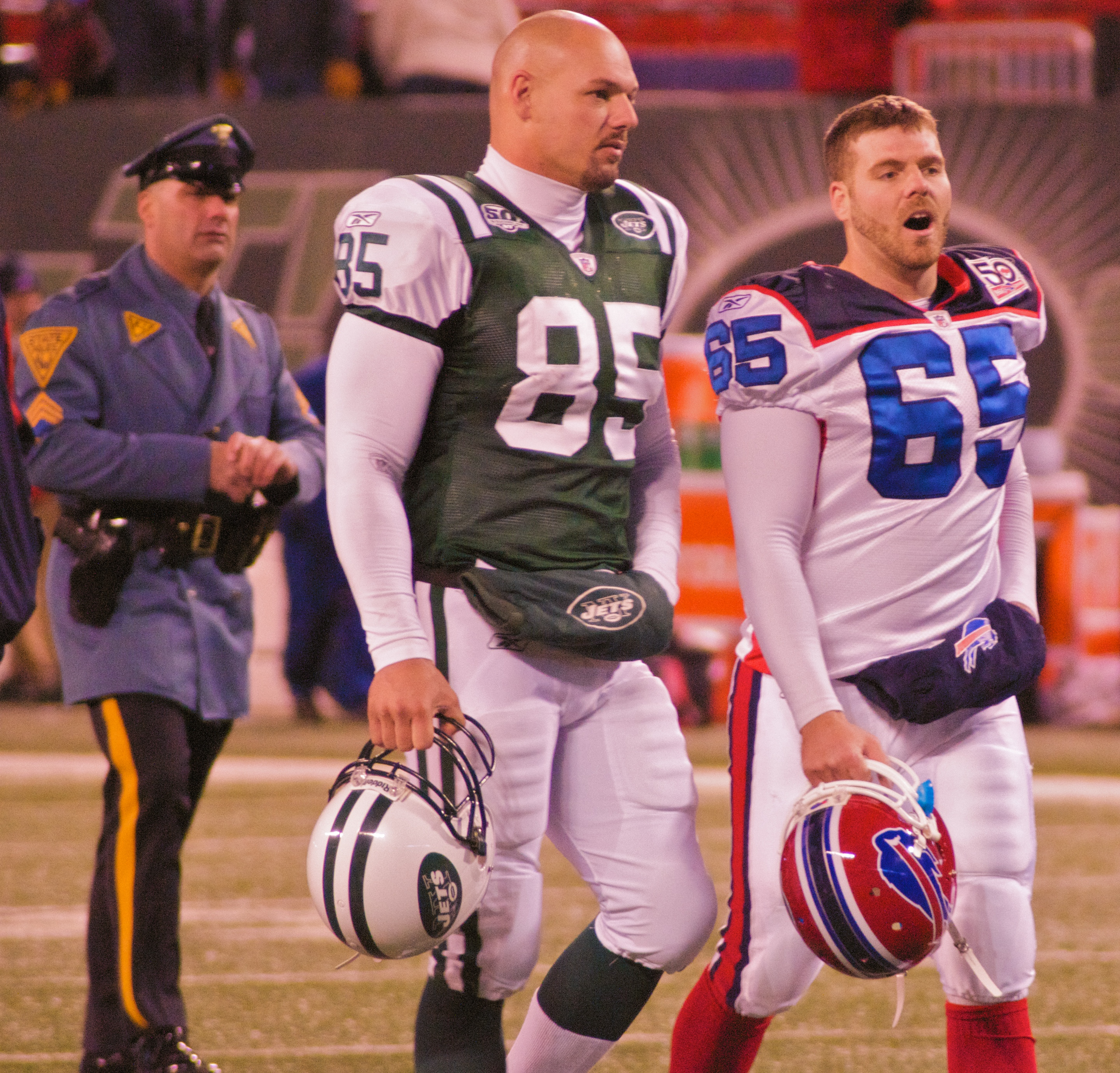
Players chatting following a game

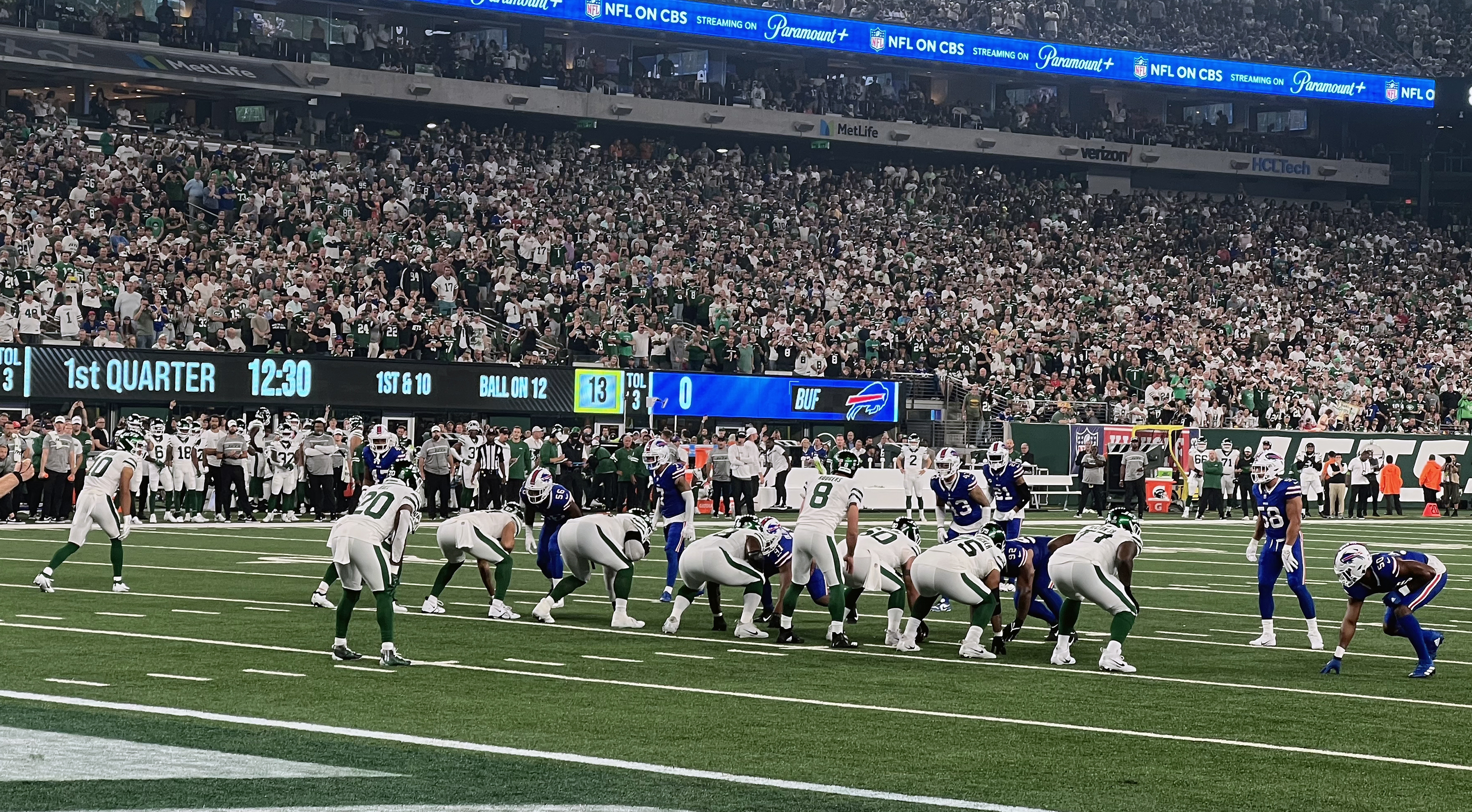
Jets QB Aaron Rodgers about to take a snap against the Bills in 2023, shortly before his Achilles injury

== Season-by-season results ==
Buffalo Bills vs. New York Jets Season-by-Season Results
1960s (Bills, 11–9)

Season	Season series	at Buffalo Bills	at New York Titans/Jets	Overall series	Notes
1960	Titans 2–0	Titans; 17–13	Titans; 27–3	Titans; 2–0	Inaugural season for both franchises and the American Football League (AFL). Both teams are placed in the Eastern Division, becoming divisional rivals. Game in New York is the inaugural game for both franchises.
1961	Tie, 1–1	Bills; 41–31	Titans; 21–14	Titans; 3–1	In Buffalo, Bills overcame a 17–0 deficit. Game in New York was played on Thanksgiving.
1962	Tie, 1–1	Titans; 17–6	Bills; 20–3	Titans; 4–2	Last season, the Titans competed under the name "Titans."
1963	Bills 2–0	Bills; 45–14	Bills; 19–10	Tie; 4–4	Titans change their name to the "Jets."; Last matchup at Polo Grounds.
1964	Bills 2–0	Bills; 34–24	Bills; 20–7	Bills; 6–4	Jets open Shea Stadium. Bills win 1964 AFL Championship.
1965	Tie, 1–1	Bills; 33–21	Jets; 14–12	Bills; 7–5	Jets' win was the Bills only road loss in the 1965 season. Bills win 1965 AFL Championship.
1966	Bills 2–0	Bills; 14–3	Bills; 33–23	Bills; 9–5	
1967	Tie, 1–1	Bills; 20–17	Jets; 20–10	Bills; 10–6	In Buffalo, Bills overcame a 17–0 fourth quarter deficit.
1968	Tie, 1–1	Bills; 37–35	Jets; 25–21	Bills; 11–7	Bills' win was their only win in their 1968 season. Jets win 1968 AFL championship and Super Bowl III.
1969	Jets 2–0	Jets; 33–19	Jets; 16–6	Bills; 11–9	

1970s (Tie, 10–10)

Season	Season series	at Buffalo Bills	at New York Jets	Overall series	Notes
1970	Bills 2–0	Bills; 34–31	Bills; 10–6	Bills; 13–9	As a result of the AFL–NFL merger, the Bills and Jets are placed in the AFC East. Bills’ win in New York snapped their 15‑game road losing streak and their 16‑game road winless streak.
1971	Jets 2–0	Jets; 20–7	Jets; 28–17	Bills; 13–11	
1972	Jets 2–0	Jets; 41–24	Jets; 41–3	Tie; 13–13	Last matchup at War Memorial Stadium.
1973	Bills 2–0	Bills; 9–7	Bills; 34–14	Bills; 15–13	Bills open Rich Stadium (now known as Highmark Stadium). In New York, Bills' RB O. J. Simpson breaks the NFL regular season rushing record.
1974	Tie 1–1	Bills; 16–12	Jets; 20–10	Bills; 16–14	
1975	Bills 2–0	Bills; 42–14	Bills; 24–23	Bills; 18–14	In Buffalo, Jets allow 309 rushing yards from the Bills, setting a franchise record for most rushing yards allowed in a game (broken in 1976). In New York, Bills overcame a 23–7 third quarter deficit.
1976	Jets 2–0	Jets; 19–14	Jets; 17–14	Bills; 18–16	
1977	Tie 1–1	Jets; 24–19	Bills; 14–10	Bills; 19–17	
1978	Jets 2–0	Jets; 21–20	Jets; 45–14	Tie; 19–19	
1979	Bills 2–0	Bills; 46–31	Bills; 14–12	Bills; 21–19	In Buffalo, Bills score their most points in a game against the Jets.

1980s (Bills, 10–9)

Season	Season series	at Buffalo Bills	at New York Jets	Overall series	Notes
1980	Bills 2–0	Bills; 20–10	Bills; 31–24	Bills; 23–19	
1981	Tie 1–1	Bills; 31–0	Jets; 33–14	Bills; 24–20	
1981 Playoffs	Bills 1–0		Bills; 31–27	Bills; 25–20	AFC Wild Card Round. First NFL playoff matchup between two New York-based teams.
1983	Tie 1–1	Jets; 34–10	Bills; 24–17	Bills; 26–21	Bills and Jets did not face each other in the 1982 season due to the 1982 NFL player strike cancelling both games. QBs Jim Kelly and Ken O'Brien were drafted by the Bills and Jets respectively as part of QB class of 1983. Following their win, the Bills went on a 13-game road losing streak against divisional opponents. Last meeting at Shea Stadium.
1984	Jets 2–0	Jets; 28–26	Jets; 21–17	Bills; 26–23	Jets move to The Meadowlands (now known as Giants Stadium).
1985	Jets 2–0	Jets; 27–7	Jets; 42–3	Bills; 26–25	In New York, Jets record their largest victory over the Bills with a 39–point differential.
1986	Jets 2–0	Jets; 28–24	Jets; 14–13	Jets; 27–26	In Buffalo, Jim Kelly makes his debut in the NFL. In New York, an incident occurred when referee Ben Dreith issued a "giving him the business" call to Jets' DE Marty Lyons after he repeatedly punched Kelly in the head.
1987	Tie 1–1	Jets; 31–28	Bills; 17–14	Jets; 28–27	
1988	Bills 2–0	Bills; 9–6 (OT)	Bills; 37–14	Bills; 29–28	After the game in New York, Jets' DE Mark Gastineau, who was leading the AFC in sacks, abruptly announced his retirement to tend to his girlfriend Brigette Nielsen after she was diagnosed with uterine cancer.
1989	Bills 2–0	Bills; 34–3	Bills; 37–0	Bills; 31–28	In New York, Bills record their largest victory over the Jets with a 37–point differential and clinch the AFC East with their win.

1990s (Bills, 14–6)

Season	Season series	at Buffalo Bills	at New York Jets	Overall series	Notes
1990	Bills 2–0	Bills; 30–27	Bills; 30–7	Bills; 33–28	Bills lose Super Bowl XXV.
1991	Bills 2–0	Bills; 24–13	Bills; 23–20	Bills; 35–28	Bills lose Super Bowl XXVI.
1992	Tie 1–1	Jets; 24–17	Bills; 24–20	Bills; 36–29	Bills win ten straight meetings (1987–1992). Bills lose Super Bowl XXVII.
1993	Bills 2–0	Bills; 16–14	Bills; 19–10	Bills; 38–29	Bills lose Super Bowl XXVIII.
1994	Jets 2–0	Jets; 23–3	Jets; 22–17	Bills; 38–31	
1995	Bills 2–0	Bills; 29–10	Bills; 28–26	Bills; 40–31	
1996	Bills 2–0	Bills; 35–10	Bills; 25–22	Bills; 42–31	
1997	Bills 2–0	Bills; 20–10	Bills; 28–22	Bills; 44–31	
1998	Jets 2–0	Jets; 17–10	Jets; 34–12	Bills; 44–33	In Buffalo, Jets clinch their first AFC East title and first division title since the 1969 season with their win.
1999	Tie 1–1	Bills; 17–3	Jets; 17–7	Bills; 45–34	

2000s (Jets, 11–9)

Season	Season series	at Buffalo Bills	at New York Jets	Overall series	Notes
2000	Tie 1–1	Bills; 23–20	Jets; 27–14	Bills; 46–35	
2001	Tie 1–1	Jets; 42–36	Bills; 14–9	Bills; 47–36	
2002	Jets 2–0	Jets; 37–31 (OT)	Jets; 31–13	Bills; 47–38	
2003	Tie 1–1	Bills; 17–6	Jets; 30–3	Bills; 48–39	
2004	Tie 1–1	Bills; 22–17	Jets; 16–14	Bills; 49–40	
2005	Tie 1–1	Bills; 27–17	Jets; 30–26	Bills; 50–41	
2006	Tie 1–1	Jets; 28–20	Bills; 31–13	Bills; 51–42	
2007	Bills 2–0	Bills; 17–14	Bills; 13–3	Bills; 53–42	
2008	Jets 2–0	Jets; 26–17	Jets; 31–27	Bills; 53–44	
2009	Tie 1–1	Jets; 19–13	Bills; 16–13 (OT)	Bills; 54–45	Bills and Jets face off at Rogers Centre in Toronto, Ontario as part of the Bills Toronto Series. It is accounted for as a Bills home game. Last meeting at Giants Stadium.

2010s (Jets, 11–9)

Season	Season series	at Buffalo Bills	at New York Jets	Overall series	Notes
2010	Jets 2–0	Jets; 38–14	Jets; 38–7	Bills; 54–47	Jets open New Meadowlands Stadium (now known as MetLife Stadium).
2011	Jets 2–0	Jets; 27–11	Jets; 28–24	Bills; 54–49	
2012	Tie 1–1	Bills; 28–9	Jets; 48–28	Bills; 55–50	In New York, Jets score their most points in a game against the Bills.
2013	Tie 1–1	Bills; 37–14	Jets; 27–20	Bills; 56–51	
2014	Bills 2–0	Bills; 38–3	Bills; 43–23	Bills; 58–51	Due to the 2014 lake-effect snowstorm, the Bills home game was moved to Ford Field in Detroit.
2015	Bills 2–0	Bills; 22–17	Bills; 22–17	Bills; 60–51	Bills hire former Jets HC Rex Ryan. In Buffalo, Bills win eliminates the Jets from playoff contention.
2016	Jets 2–0	Jets; 37–31	Jets; 30–10	Bills; 60–53	
2017	Tie 1–1	Bills; 21–12	Jets; 34–21	Bills; 61–54	
2018	Tie 1–1	Jets; 27–23	Bills; 41–10	Bills; 62–55	Bills' QB Josh Allen makes his debut in the series.
2019	Tie 1–1	Jets; 13–6	Bills; 17–16	Bills; 63–56	In New York, Bills overcome a 16–0 deficit and four turnovers.

2020s (Bills, 11–2)

Season	Season series	at Buffalo Bills	at New York Jets	Overall series	Notes
2020	Bills 2–0	Bills; 27–17	Bills; 18–10	Bills; 65–56	In New York, Bills overcome a 10–0 deficit despite not scoring a touchdown. Bills sweep the AFC East for the first time.
2021	Bills 2–0	Bills; 27–10	Bills; 45–17	Bills; 67–56	In Buffalo, Bills clinch the AFC East with their win.
2022	Tie 1–1	Bills; 20–12	Jets; 20–17	Bills; 68–57	
2023	Tie 1–1	Bills; 32–6	Jets; 22–16 (OT)	Bills; 69–58	Jets trade for QB Aaron Rodgers, who makes his first debut as a Jets QB in New York. However, he suffered a torn Achilles four plays into the game.
2024	Bills 2–0	Bills; 40–14	Bills; 23–20	Bills; 71–58	
2025	Bills 2–0	Bills; 35–8	Bills; 30–10	Bills; 73–58	
2026	Bills 1–0	January 9/10	Bills; 31–12	Bills; 74–58	

Summary of Results

Season	Season series	at Buffalo Bills	at New York Titans/Jets	Notes
AFL regular season	Bills 11–9	Bills 7–3	Jets 6–4	
NFL regular season	Bills 62–49	Bills 32–23	Bills 30–26	
AFL and NFL regular season	Bills 73–58	Bills 39–26	Bills 34–32	
NFL postseason	Bills 1–0	No games	Bills 1–0	AFC Wild Card: 1981
Regular and postseason	Bills 74–58	Bills 39–26	Bills 35–32	Jets are 1–0 at Rogers Centre in Toronto, Ontario (2009), and the Bills are 1–0 at Ford Field in Detroit (2014), both accounted for as Bills home games.

== Connections between the teams ==
=== Coaches ===
The most notable connection between the Bills and Jets has been Rex Ryan, who carried over many of his staff from the Jets when he was hired as the Bills' head coach.

Name	Position(s)	Bills' tenure	Jets' tenure
Bill Bradley	Defensive backs coach	1998–2000	2001–2003
Rex Ryan	Head coach	2015–16	2009–14
Mike Pettine	Defensive coordinator	2013	2009–2012
David Lee	Quarterbacks coach	2012, 2015–16	2013-14
Chan Gailey	Head coach/Offensive coordinator	2010–2012	2015–2016
Anthony Lynn	Running backs coach/Offensive coordinator	2015–16	2009–14
Dennis Thurman	Defensive backs coach/Defensive coordinator	2015–16	2008–14
Rick Dennison	Offensive coordinator/Offensive line coach	2017	2018
Gregg Williams	Head coach/Defensive coordinator	2001–2003	2019–2020
Eric Washington	Defensive line coach	2020–2023	2025
Joe Danna	Defensive backs coach/Safeties coach/Secondary coach	2023–present	2015–2016

=== Players ===
Several players have been members of both teams during their careers, including:

Name	Position(s)	Bills' tenure	Jets' tenure
Brad Smith	Wide receiver/Kickoff returner	2011–13	2006–10
Aaron Maybin	Linebacker/Defensive end	2009–10	2011–12
Ryan Fitzpatrick	Quarterback	2009–12	2015–16
Frank Gore	Running back	2019	2020
Mecole Hardman	Wide receiver	2025	2023
David Nelson	Wide receiver	2010–12	2013–14
Percy Harvin	Wide receiver	2015–16	2014
IK Enemkpali	Linebacker	2015–16	2014
Jim Leonhard	Safety	2005–2007, 2013	2011
Andre Roberts	Wide receiver/kick returner	2019–2020	2018
Mike White	Quarterback	2024	2019–2022
Brian Winters	Guard	2020	2013–2019
Shaq Lawson	Defensive end	2016–2019, 2022–2023, 2025	2021
Ty Johnson	Running back	2023–present	2020–2022
Frank Reich	Quarterback	1985–1994	1996
Tyrod Taylor	Quarterback	2015–2017	2024–2025
Elijah Moore	Wide receiver	2025	2021–2022
Harrison Phillips	Defensive tackle	2018–2021	2025–present

== See also ==
- National Football League rivalries
- AFC East
