= Bryan Cox Jr. =

American football player (born 1994)

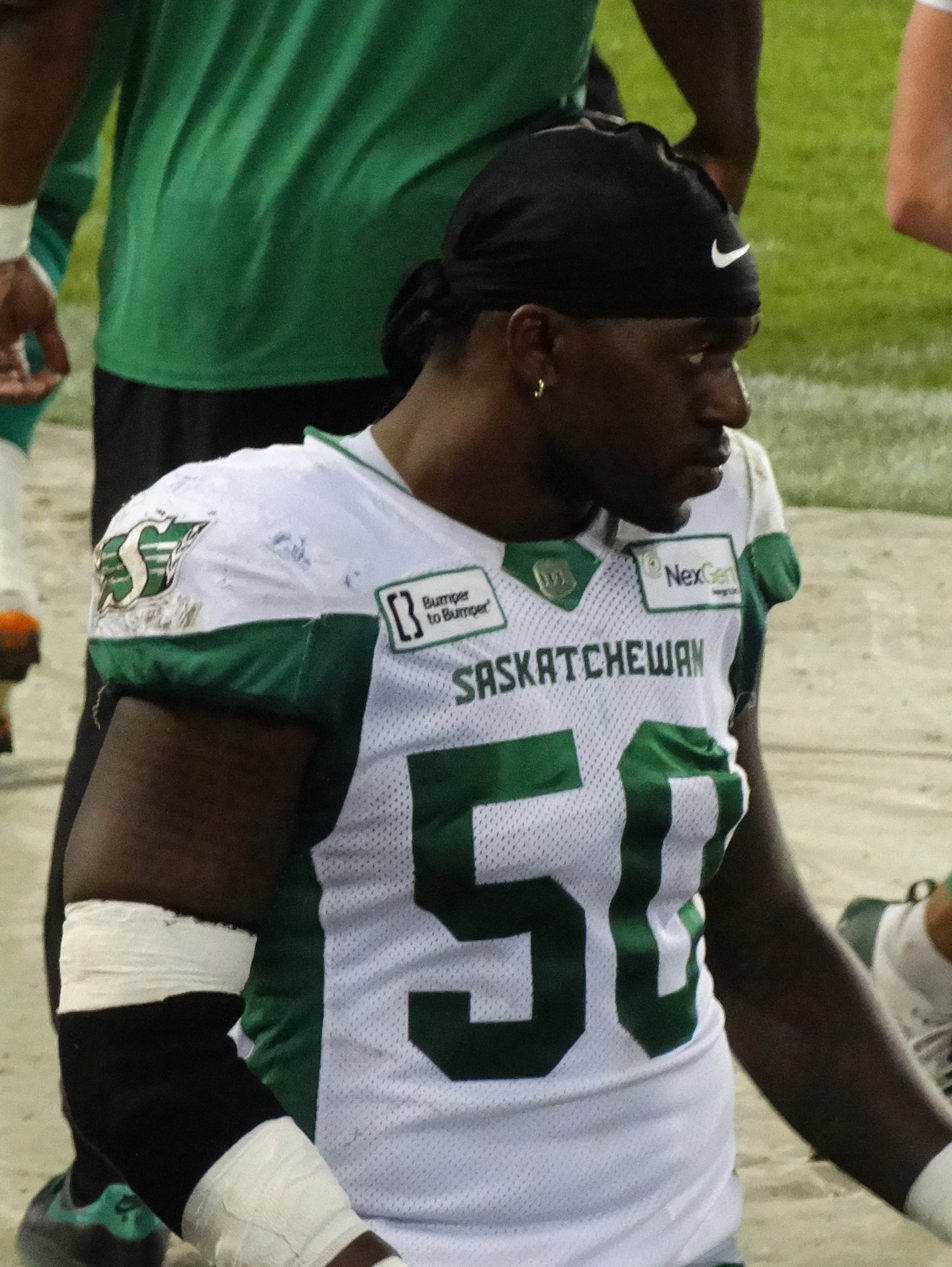
- Cox Jr. with the Saskatchewan Roughriders in 2024

Profile
- Position: Defensive end

Personal information
- Born: June 25, 1994 (age 32); St. Louis, Missouri, U.S.
- Listed height: 6 ft 3 in (1.91 m)
- Listed weight: 270 lb (122 kg)

Career information
- High school: St. Thomas Aquinas (Fort Lauderdale, Florida)
- College: Florida
- NFL draft: 2017: undrafted

Career history
- Carolina Panthers (2017–2019); Cleveland Browns (2019); Buffalo Bills (2020–2021); Indianapolis Colts (2022)*; Saskatchewan Roughriders (2023–2024); Toronto Argonauts (2025)
- * Offseason or practice squad member only

Career NFL statistics
- Total tackles: 31
- Sacks: 0.5
- Fumble recoveries: 1
- Stats at Pro Football Reference
- Stats at CFL.ca

Bryan Keith Cox Jr. (born June 25, 1994) is an American professional football defensive end. He most recently played for the Toronto Argonauts of the Canadian Football League (CFL). He played college football at Florida.

== Early life ==
A three-star prospect according to ESPN, Scout.com and Rivals.com. Rated the No. 66 player in the state of Florida and the No. 37 strongside defensive end in the country by Rivals.com.

== College career ==
After playing a reserve role as a freshman (eight games, five tackles, two sacks), he won a starting job in 2014 (29 tackles, six for loss, four sacks). Despite having hip surgery after the regular season that year, Cox came back to start 12 games as a junior, setting career highs in tackles (45), tackles for loss (10.5), and forced fumbles (two). Also, finishing the year one sack short of a new career high. Injuries limited his effectiveness in 2016, allowing him to only make 19 tackles (2.5 for loss, 0.5 sack) in 11 games.

== Professional career ==
=== Carolina Panthers ===
Cox signed with the Carolina Panthers as an undrafted free agent following the 2017 NFL draft. He was waived on September 2, 2017, and signed to the Panthers' practice squad the next day. He was promoted to the active roster on September 30, 2017.

Cox was waived during final roster cuts on August 31, 2019, and was signed to the practice squad the next day. He was promoted to the active roster on October 1, 2019. He was waived on November 8.

=== Cleveland Browns ===
Cox was signed by the Cleveland Browns on November 13, 2019.

=== Buffalo Bills ===
Cox was signed by the Buffalo Bills on April 29, 2020. He was waived on September 5, 2020, and signed to the practice squad the next day. He was elevated to the active roster on October 19 for the team's week 6 game against the Kansas City Chiefs, and reverted to the practice squad after the game. On January 26, 2021, Cox signed a reserves/futures contract with the Bills. He was placed on injured reserve with an Achilles' tendon injury on June 22, 2021.

=== Indianapolis Colts ===
Cox signed with the Indianapolis Colts on June 12, 2022. He was released on July 29, 2022.

=== Saskatchewan Roughriders ===
On May 8, 2023, Cox Jr. signed with the Saskatchewan Roughriders of the Canadian Football League (CFL).

=== Toronto Argonauts ===
On February 13, 2025, it was announced that Cox Jr. had signed with the Toronto Argonauts. He spent one year with Toronto and became a free agent upon the expiry of his contract on February 10, 2026.

== Personal life ==
He is the son of three-time Pro Bowler linebacker Bryan Cox.
