= Bills–Dolphins rivalry =

American football rivalry

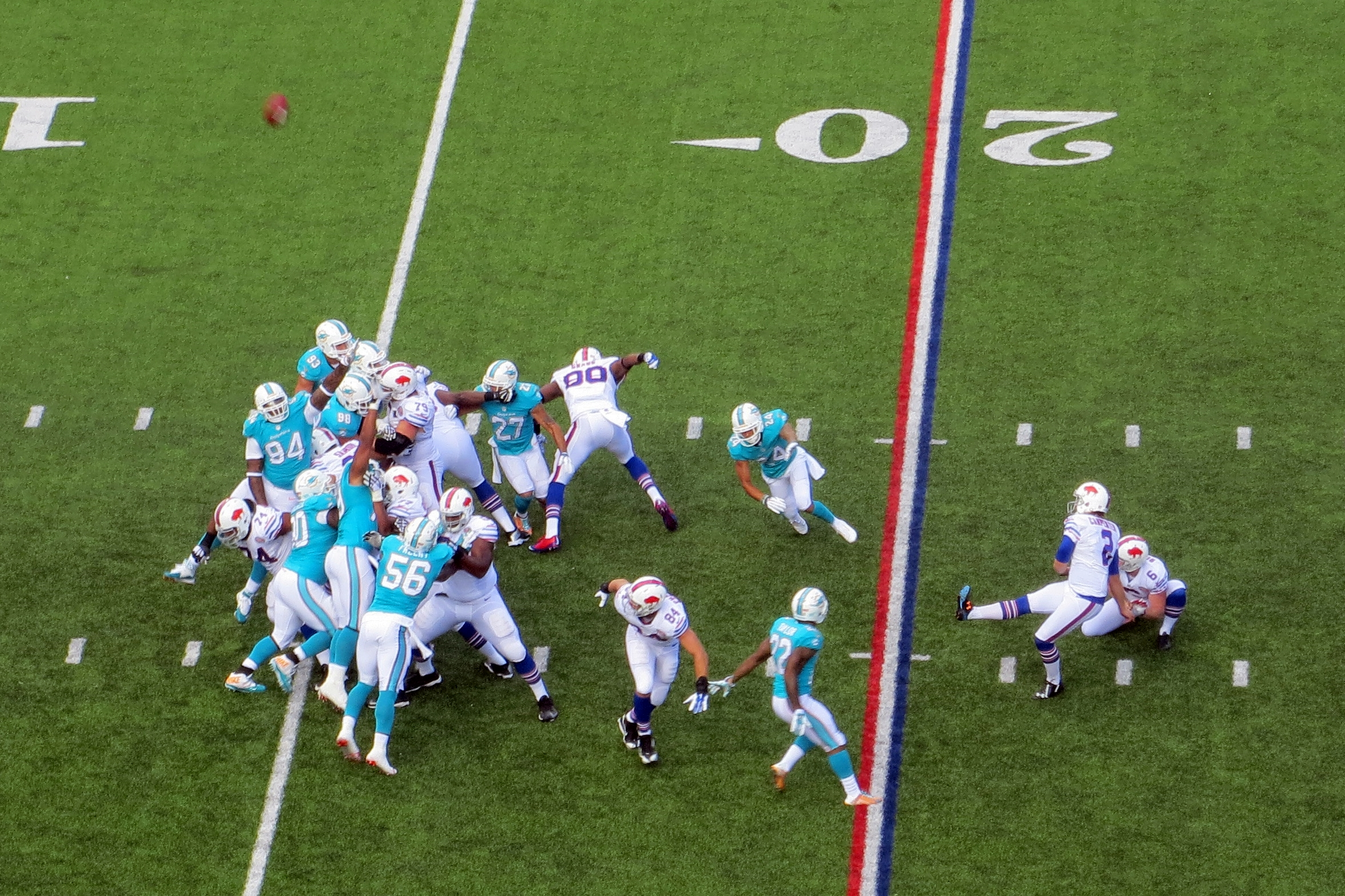
- Bills and Dolphins face off during the 2014 season.

- Buffalo Bills Miami Dolphins
- Location: Buffalo, Miami
- First meeting: September 18, 1966; Bills 58, Dolphins 24
- Latest meeting: November 22, 2026; Bills 26, Dolphins 9
- Next meeting: January 3, 2027
- Stadiums: Bills: Highmark Stadium; Dolphins: Hard Rock Stadium

Statistics
- Total meetings: 126
- All-time series: Dolphins: 63–62–1
- Regular season series: Dolphins: 62–58–1
- Postseason results: Bills: 4–1
- Largest victory: Bills: 35–0 (2021); Dolphins: 45–7 (1970)
- Most points scored: Bills: 58 (1966); Dolphins: 45 (1970), (1976)
- Longest win streak: Bills: 7 (2018–2021, 2022–2025); Dolphins: 20 (1970–1979)
- Current win streak: Bills: 1 (2026–present)

Post-season history
- 1990 AFC Divisional: Bills won: 44–34; 1992 AFC Championship: Bills won: 29–10; 1995 AFC Wild Card: Bills won: 37–22; 1998 AFC Wild Card: Dolphins won: 24–17; 2022 AFC Wild Card: Bills won: 34–31

The Bills–Dolphins rivalry is a National Football League (NFL) rivalry between the Buffalo Bills and Miami Dolphins.

The teams, both members of the AFC East, have played each other twice per year since the 1966 season.

The rivalry was once lopsided as the Dolphins, one of the league's best teams after Don Shula took over as head coach in the 1970s, amassed 20 consecutive wins over the Bills in that decade. It later became more competitive in the 1980s as Buffalo emerged as a leading team in the AFC alongside Miami. During the 1990s, the teams faced off four different times in the AFC playoffs, and the period featured Hall of Fame quarterbacks Jim Kelly for Buffalo and Dan Marino for Miami. Though both teams fell short of the same level of success in the 2000s and 2010s after the retirements of Shula, Kelly, Marino, and Bills coach Marv Levy, the Bills and Dolphins have maintained their rivalry, which became competitive again during the early 2020s as both teams became playoff contenders once more.

The Dolphins lead the overall series, 63–62–1. The two teams have met five times in the playoffs, with the Bills holding a 4–1 record.

== History ==
=== 1966–1969: The AFL days ===
After Miami joined the American Football League (AFL) for the 1966 season, it played against Buffalo for the first time on September 18. The host Bills posted 48 points in the first half of the game, and won 58–24. In the second game between the teams, and the first to be played in Miami, the Bills shut out the Dolphins 29–0. The following year, Miami defeated Buffalo for the first time; a late 31-yard Bob Griese touchdown pass to Howard Twilley gave the Dolphins a 17–14 win. In 1968, the teams played to a 14–14 tie, the only one in the rivalry. After two consecutive Dolphins victories, the Bills won the teams' second game in 1969, 28–3. The game, which featured two receiving touchdowns by O. J. Simpson, proved to be their last win in the series for 11 years.

=== 1970–1979: Complete dominance by Miami ===
Following the 1969 season, the AFL and NFL completed the AFL–NFL merger by re-aligning the NFL's divisions. The Bills and Dolphins joined the NFL's new AFC East division, guaranteeing that they would play twice per year, once at each team's home stadium. In the 1970s, Miami won all 20 meetings between the teams; 12 of the victories came by 10 or more points. Under head coach Don Shula, the Dolphins became a league power during the decade, appearing in the Super Bowl three times and winning two championships. One of the most notable Bills–Dolphins games of this period came in 1972, the year the Dolphins completed an undefeated season. The closest game by final score that Miami played during the season was its first game against the Bills, a 24–23 Dolphins win in the Miami Orange Bowl. Two years later, the Orange Bowl hosted a contest that Chris Iorfida of CBC Sports later called "A rare competitive game between the clubs during the mid- to late-1970s, and an exciting one." The Dolphins held a 28–21 lead when Bills reserve quarterback Gary Marangi passed for the tying touchdown in the final minute of the game. Miami responded 37 seconds later with a 23-yard Don Nottingham run for the touchdown that gave the team a 35–28 win.

By November 1978, the Dolphins' winning streak in the series had reached 17 games, a mark tied for the longest streak in NFL history for one team against another. The press in the Buffalo area frequently noted this fact. The Dolphins broke the record with a 25–24 result in Buffalo's Rich Stadium on November 12 of that year. With 9–7 and 17–7 victories in 1979, Miami's streak reached 20 by the end of the decade.

=== 1980–1989: Bills turn the corner and the emergence of Marino and Kelly ===
On September 7, 1980, the Bills recorded their first victory versus the Dolphins in 21 games, after failing to win a single game against them during the 1970s. With a pair of touchdowns in the final quarter, Buffalo won 17–7. After the conclusion, fans at Rich Stadium rushed the field in celebration, tearing down one of the goal posts in the process. In 1983, the Dolphins hosted the Bills in rookie Dan Marino's first NFL start. The Dolphins overcame a 14–0 gap to lead 35–28 in the final minute before Bills quarterback Joe Ferguson led a game-tying comeback. The game in the Miami Orange Bowl went to overtime, where Dolphins placekicker Uwe von Schamann was unsuccessful on two potential game-winning field goal attempts. The Bills won 38–35 when Joe Danelo made a 36-yard field goal attempt late in overtime; it was Buffalo's first road win in the rivalry for 17 years. Ferguson had 419 yards passing and five touchdowns in the game; the former set a franchise record. Other than those two contests, Miami won 11 of the other 12 games between the teams from 1980 to 1986. United Press International termed the matchup "one of pro football's most lopsided rivalries" in 1983. The Bills, however, won the series' last six games in the 1980s. The first of those came in October 1987, when the Bills won 34–31 in overtime after trailing the Dolphins 21–0 in the first half; the game featured six combined touchdown passes by the teams' quarterbacks, Marino of Miami and Jim Kelly of Buffalo. One of the final games between the Bills and Dolphins in the decade was a 1989 encounter in which Kelly ran two yards for a touchdown on the last play of the contest, giving the Bills a 27–24 victory.

=== 1990–1999: Fight for AFC supremacy ===
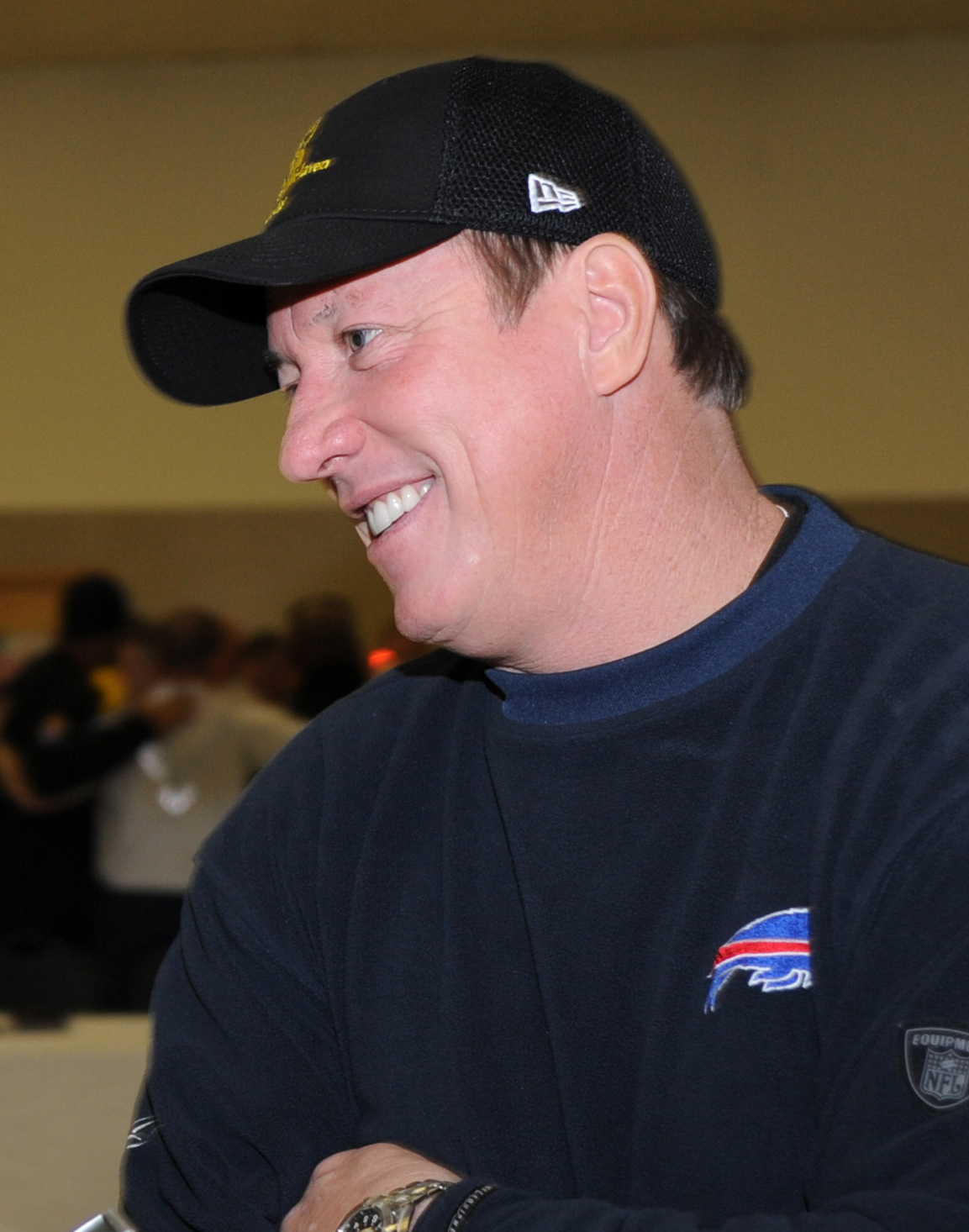
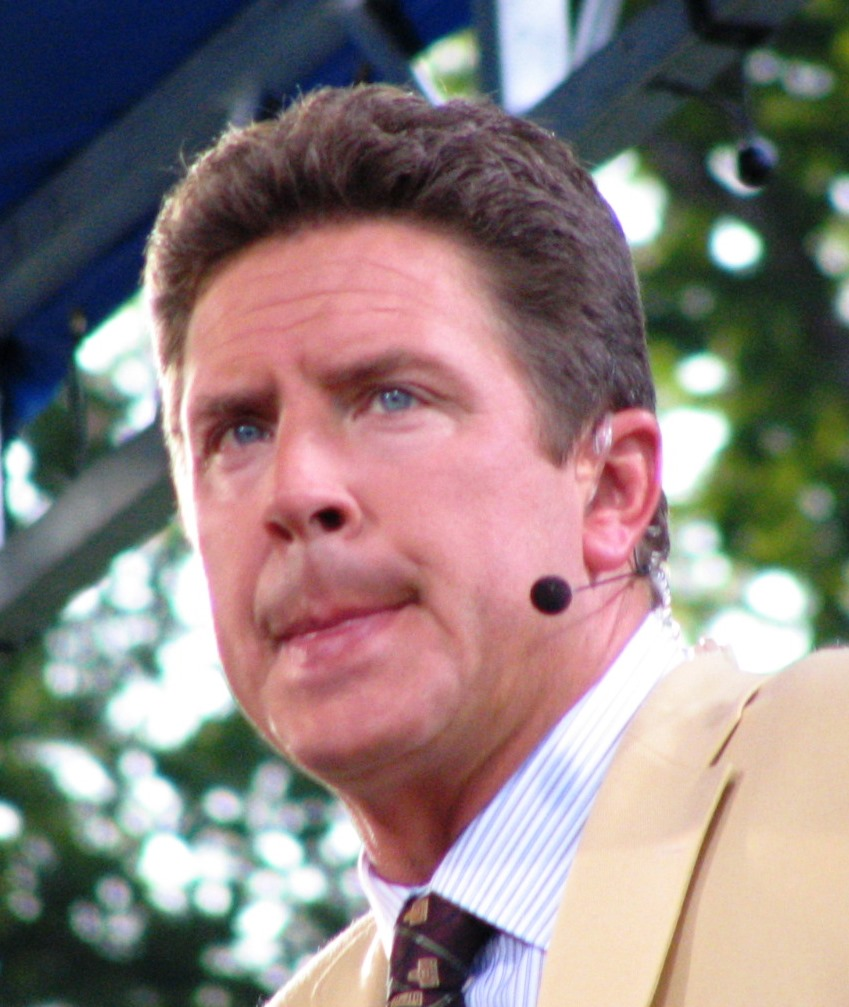
Jim Kelly (top) and Dan Marino (bottom), both part of the famed quarterback class of 1983, were leading figures in the rivalry during their careers in the 1980s and 1990s.

Most of the 1990s games between the teams featured the quarterback play of Marino and Kelly, who became key figures in the rivalry, and eventually earned induction into the Pro Football Hall of Fame. From 1986 to 1996, they had a total of 21 matchups, counting postseason games. In the 1990 playoffs, the Bills and Dolphins met for the first time in the postseason. Buffalo won the divisional round game, held at Rich Stadium, 44–34, as Kelly threw for three touchdowns. Two seasons later, the teams met again in the playoffs, this time in the AFC Championship Game. Players from both teams commented on the rivalry's intensity at the time; Richmond Webb, a Miami offensive lineman, said, "I don't know how it got started – it was a long time before I got here – but these two teams don't like each other. It's like the Game of the Year every time we play them." Before the Bills' last regular season game against the Houston Oilers, Miami safety Louis Oliver had shirts delivered to Oilers players, encouraging them to defeat the Bills; the Oilers did just that, winning 27–3 and allowing the Dolphins to finish first in the AFC East. In response, Bills running back Thurman Thomas said it was "typical of the Miami Dolphins ... to have someone else do their dirty work." A week later, the Oilers raced to a 35–3 lead but collapsed in a 41–38 loss to the Bills in the wild card playoff round, then on January 17, 1993, at Joe Robbie Stadium, the Bills defeated the Dolphins 29–10 to advance to their third consecutive Super Bowl.

The first game in the series in the 1993 season, in Rich Stadium, saw an incident where Miami linebacker Bryan Cox gestured at Bills fans, having previously said that he would "retire from football if I am ever traded up there." Multiple Dolphins players later said the spectators responded in a similar fashion towards them. After a 22–13 Dolphins victory over the Bills, sportswriter Bill Plaschke called the game "a considerable step toward making their rivalry the ugliest in the league". The teams met twice more in the playoffs during the 1990s. On December 30, 1995, Buffalo broke the league record for rushing yards in a game with 341, winning 37–22. This was Shula's last game in the NFL. Three seasons later, the teams met at Pro Player Stadium on January 2, 1999, for their fourth playoff game of the decade, which the Dolphins won 24–17 after forcing five Bills turnovers. In regular season games during the decade, the Bills held a 12–8 win–loss advantage. CBS Sports would later rank the Bills–Dolphins rivalry as the fifth-best NFL rivalry of the 1990s.

=== 2000–2009: Decline ===
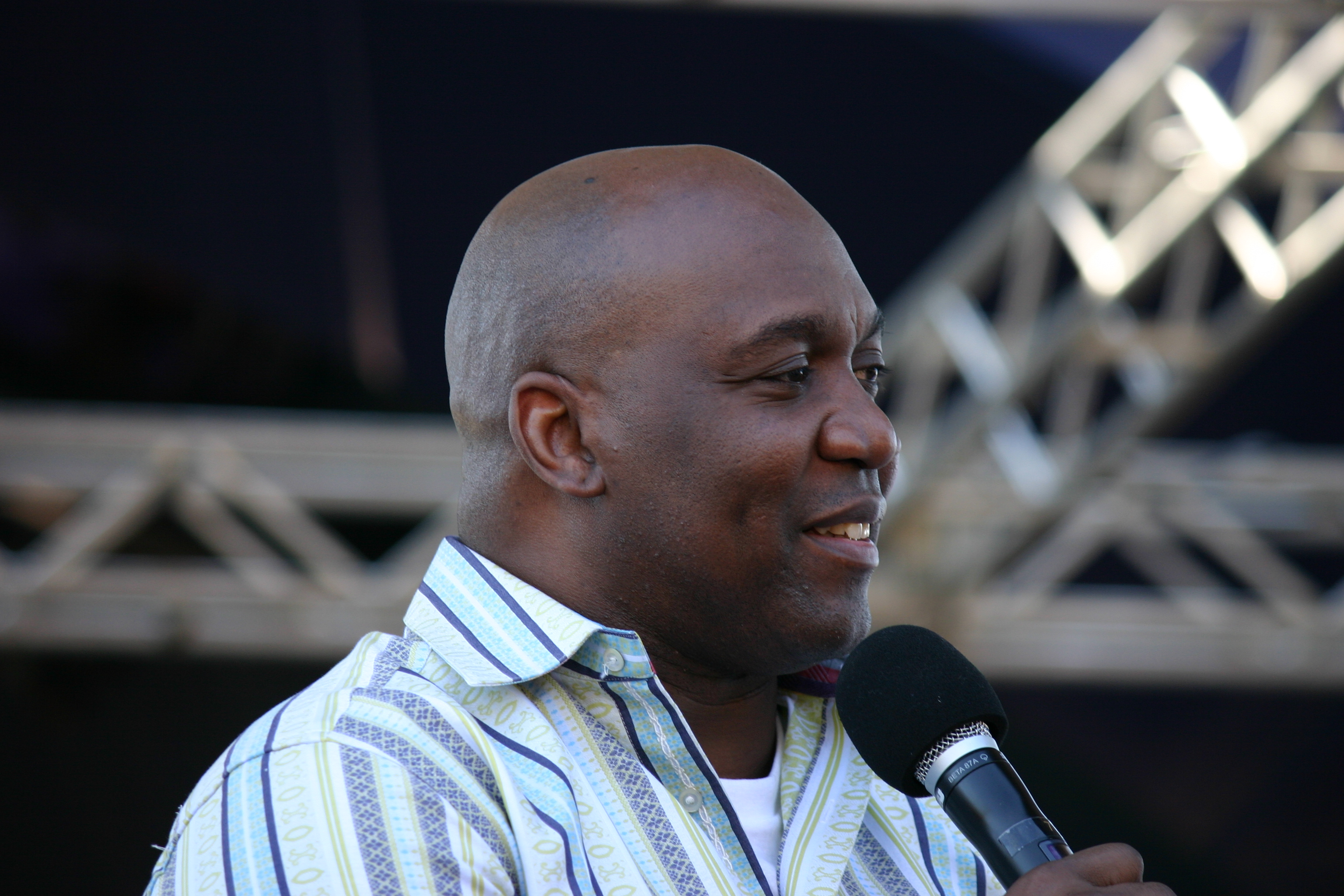
Running back Thurman Thomas, a longtime player for the Bills and a member of the Hall of Fame, concluded his NFL career with the Miami Dolphins.

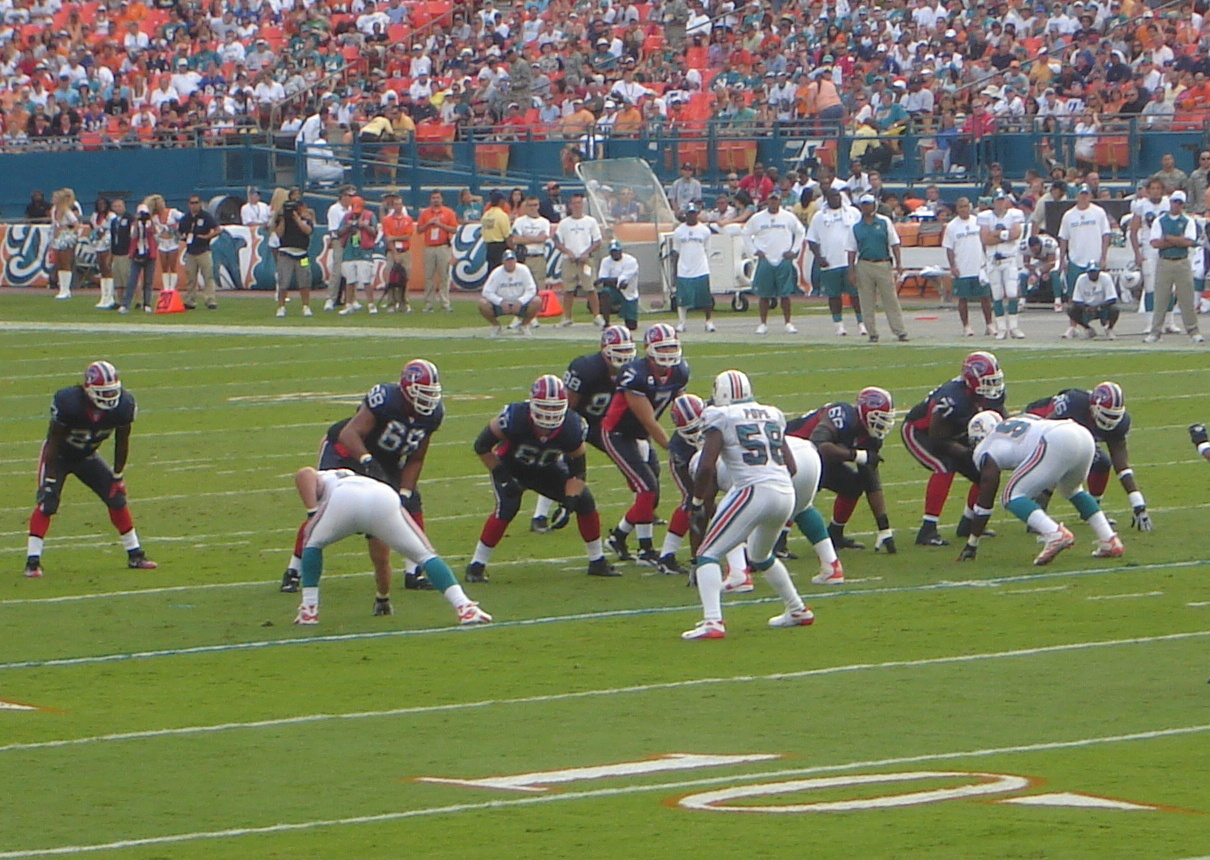
Bills quarterback J. P. Losman (number 7) takes a snap against Miami in 2007.

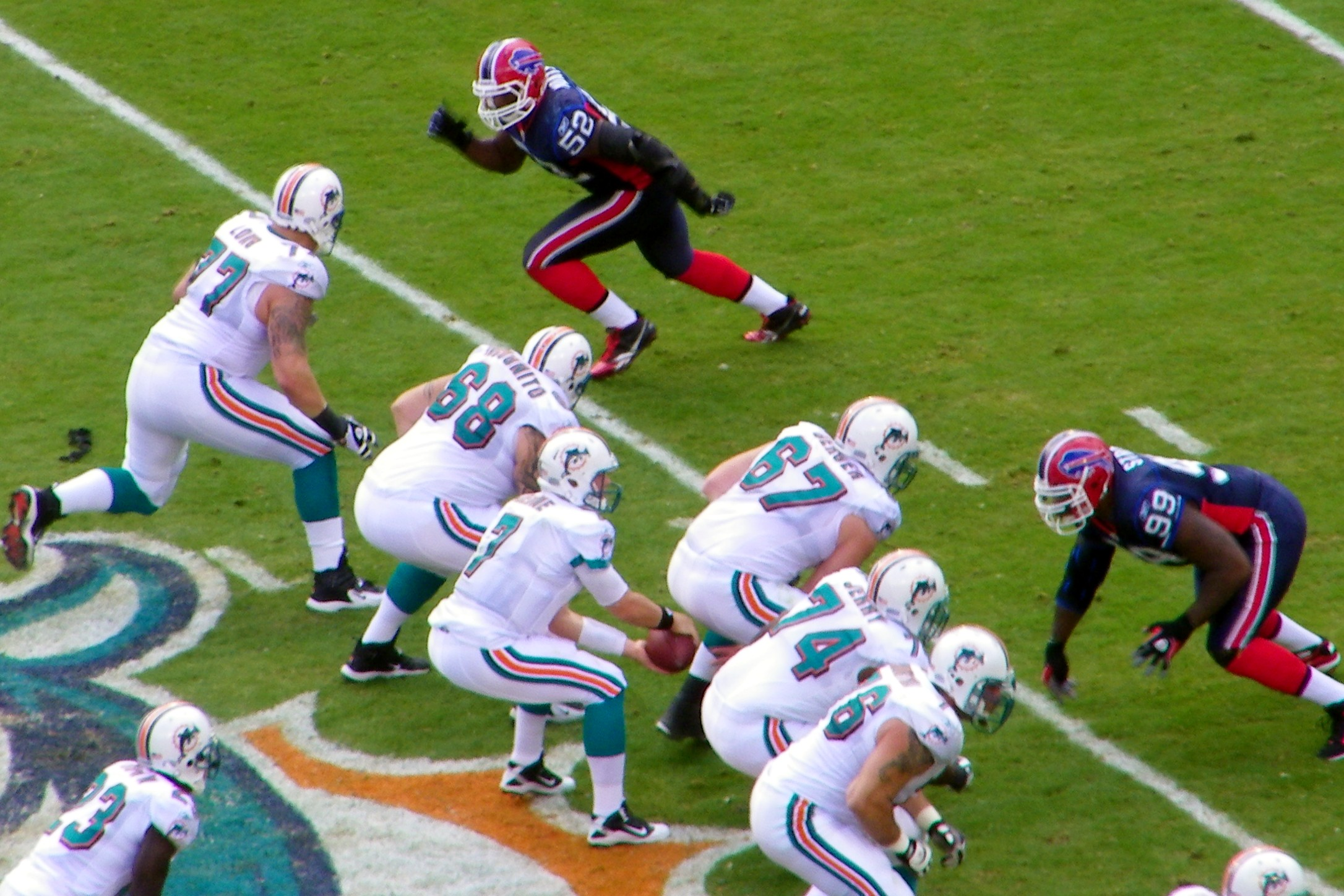
Dolphins quarterback Chad Henne (number 7) takes the snap as the Bills defense blitzes during a game in 2010.

When the NFL reshuffled its divisions after the Houston Texans joined, there was talk of the Bills moving to the AFC North, but Bills owner Ralph Wilson wanted to keep the Bills–Dolphins rivalry active, and thus, the Bills remained in the division. However, the rivalry declined sharply during the 2000s. The rise of the New England Patriots and their dominant reign over the AFC East took focus away from the rivalry. This decade was marked by the aftermath of the retirements of Kelly and Marino from the Bills and Dolphins, respectively. The Buffalo News later wrote that the rivalry had begun declining after the end of their careers. In addition, longtime Bills head coach Marv Levy, who had led the team during its run of success in the 1990s, had retired after the 1997 season. On the NFL's website, Nick Bakay attributed the decline to the reduced success of the Bills and Dolphins in the following years, as there were only three playoff appearances by either team in the 2000s, all by Miami, as the Bills missed the playoffs from 2000 to 2016. Each team won half of the 20 games in the series during the 2000s.

Two games were noteworthy in this decade. On December 4, 2005, two former teammates from the Wisconsin Badgers football team, Lee Evans on the Bills and Chris Chambers on the Dolphins, turned in strong receiving performances for their respective teams. Evans set then career highs with receiving yards (117) and touchdowns (3), but Chambers set Miami franchise records for receptions (15) and receiving yards (238) as well as scoring the game-winning touchdown for Miami in the final seconds, helping the Dolphins erase an early 21–0 Bills lead to win 24–23. In 2008, the Bills hosted Miami at the Rogers Centre in Toronto, Canada; it was the first time the country had been the site of a regular season NFL game. Miami won the contest 16–3.

=== 2010–2019 ===
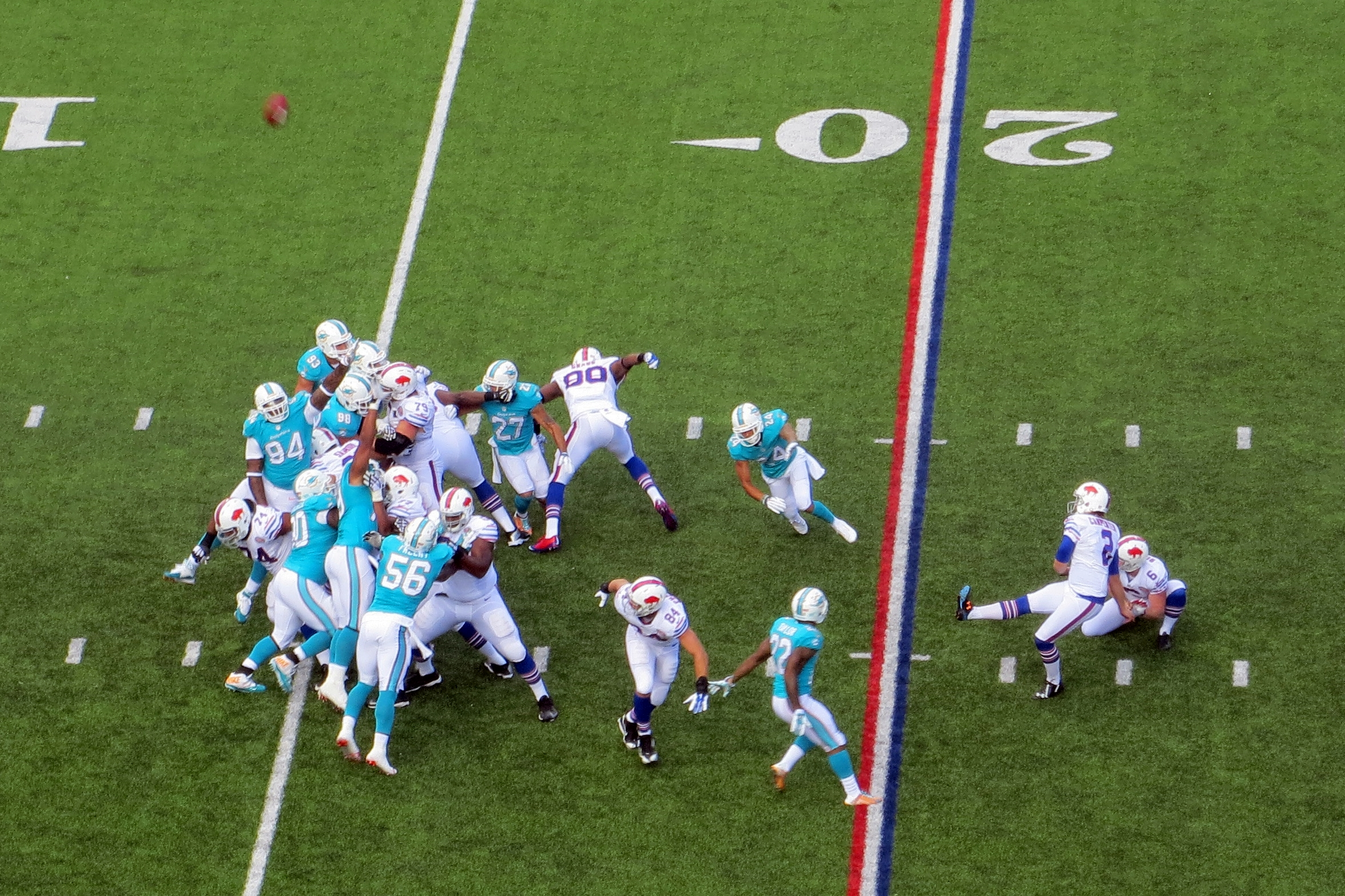
Bills placekicker Dan Carpenter attempts a kick against the Dolphins in 2014.

The teams split their two contests in 2010, while the Dolphins won both of their 2011 matchups. The Bills then won 11 of the following 16 games, claiming a 12–8 advantage during the 2010s decade.

During the 2013 season, quarterback Thad Lewis started in place of injured Bills starter EJ Manuel for both of their games against the Dolphins. This was notable as Lewis had grown up in Miami. Coincidentally, the Bills won both games. The first game was marked by a late-game strip-sack of Dolphins quarterback Ryan Tannehill by Bills defender Mario Williams to set up the Bills' game-winning field goal, and the second was a 19–0 shutout by Buffalo.

During an October 23, 2016 match-up between the two teams, the Bills had a 17–6 lead at one point in the third quarter, but a career game from Miami running back Jay Ajayi helped the Dolphins to come back in the fourth quarter, winning 28–25. Ajayi became just the fourth running back in NFL history to rush for 200 yards in back-to-back games, as he had rushed for over 200 in the prior game against the Pittsburgh Steelers. The game also featured a hit on Bills safety Aaron Williams from Dolphins receiver Jarvis Landry that ended Williams' season and ultimately led to his retirement. On December 24, 2016, the Dolphins won their first game in Buffalo since 2011. The Dolphins won a close game 34–31 in overtime to move to 10–5 on the year and clinched a playoff berth for the first time since 2008 with a Denver Broncos loss the next day. Buffalo, on the other hand, was eliminated from the postseason with the loss despite posting a franchise record 589 yards of offense in a single game. Its defense allowed a 57-yard run from Ajayi in overtime with only 10 defenders on the field, which set up Miami's game-winning field goal. Shortly after the game, the Bills fired head coach Rex Ryan.

The Bills and Dolphins did not meet again until Week 15 in the 2017 season. During the game, which also carried playoff implications, Bills running back LeSean McCoy topped 10,000 career rushing yards, becoming just the 30th NFL running back to do so. Buffalo won 24–16 as Dolphins quarterback Jay Cutler threw three interceptions. Two weeks later, a fight ensued after a Dolphins touchdown in the fourth quarter that led to the ejections of Landry and his teammate Kenyan Drake. After staving off a Dolphins comeback, the Bills clinched their first playoff berth in 18 years with a win in Miami, along with a Cincinnati Bengals victory over the Baltimore Ravens.

On December 2, 2018, Bills tight end and former Dolphin Charles Clay dropped a potential game winning pass from rookie quarterback Josh Allen, allowing a 21–17 Dolphins victory in Miami Gardens. During the rematch on December 30, Dolphins linebacker and former Bill Kiko Alonso collided with a sliding Allen, which drew a penalty and led to another fight which saw Alonso and two other players ejected. The Bills won this game 42–17. The day after this game, Miami fired head coach Adam Gase. The Bills rounded out the 2010s decade with a season sweep in 2019, winning 31–21 in Buffalo on October 20 despite Miami staying competitive under former Bills quarterback Ryan Fitzpatrick, and 37–20 in Miami on November 17.

=== 2020–present: Allen vs. Tagovailoa ===
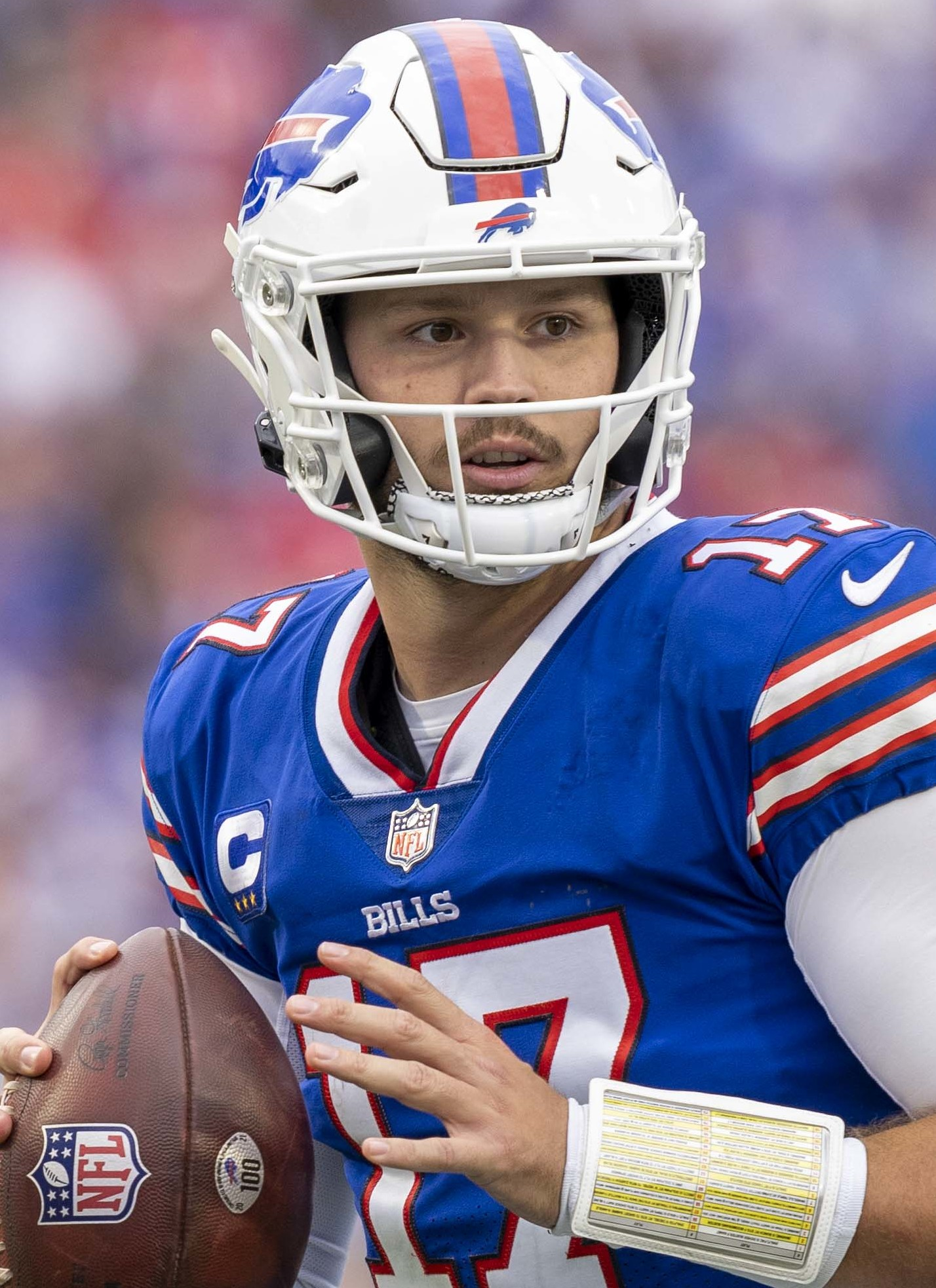
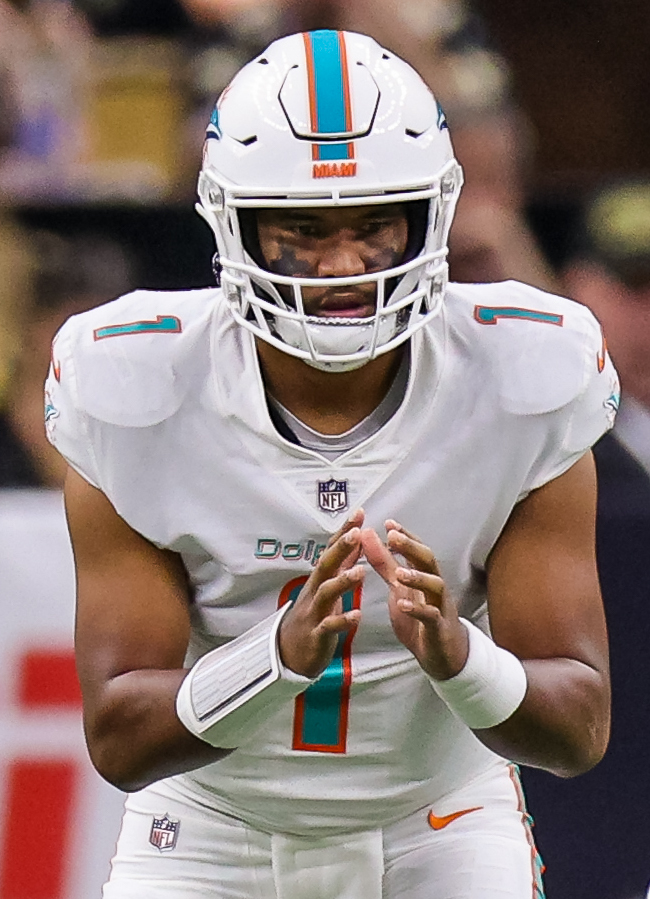
Josh Allen (top) and Tua Tagovailoa (bottom) have become leading figures in the rivalry in the 2020s.

The Dolphins began the 2020s by hiring former Bills head coach Chan Gailey as offensive coordinator, a position he previously held with Miami from 2000 to 2001. The hiring also reunited Gailey with Ryan Fitzpatrick, who was the Bills' starting quarterback during Gailey's tenure with Buffalo. The first meeting between the two teams in the 2020s resulted in a 31–28 Bills victory in Miami on September 20, 2020, with Allen out-dueling Fitzpatrick with a career-high 417 passing yards and four touchdowns. Buffalo claimed the division crown later in the season. The Dolphins ultimately failed to clinch a playoff berth, losing 56–26 to the Bills in the regular season finale, and were eliminated when the Baltimore Ravens, Cleveland Browns, and Indianapolis Colts all won that week. With both teams in postseason contention, after a long period during which they rarely reached the playoffs, the Democrat and Chronicle's Sal Maiorana wrote that the rivalry had the potential to regain intensity.

In Week 2 of the 2021 season, the Bills won 35–0 in Miami behind a strong rushing attack and defensive performance as Allen surpassed 10,000 career passing yards in the game. The Dolphins surrendered 6 sacks to the Bills defense, also losing quarterback Tua Tagovailoa to a rib injury in the first quarter. The 35–0 win was the largest margin of victory by Buffalo in the series. With a 26–11 Bills home win on October 31, 2021, Buffalo achieved a team-record seventh straight victory in the series.

Following the 2021 season, the Dolphins fired their head coach, Brian Flores, and were in contention to hire Bills offensive coordinator Brian Daboll during their head coach search, before Daboll was hired by the New York Giants on January 28, 2022. Daboll had a past connection with Tagovailoa, whom Daboll previously coached in 2017 with the Alabama Crimson Tide. The Dolphins had also interviewed Bills defensive coordinator/assistant head coach Leslie Frazier for the vacant head coaching spot. The Dolphins eventually filled the vacant head coaching position with former San Francisco 49ers offensive coordinator Mike McDaniel. The Bills and Dolphins both made major moves during the 2022 offseason, with the Bills signing Super Bowl 50 MVP Von Miller to a 6-year, $120 million deal on March 16, 2022, and the Dolphins traded for star wide receiver Tyreek Hill on March 23. The Bills' seven-game winning streak in the series ended with a 21–19 Dolphins victory in the teams' first 2022 game. Despite Buffalo running 51 more plays than Miami, several miscues by the Bills offense led to stalled drives that were key to the Dolphins winning. The Dolphins were criticized for keeping Tagovailoa, who had apparently suffered a concussion, in the game, instead indicating that he had suffered a "back injury". The rematch that year on December 17 was an offensive shootout decided by a last-second field goal by the Bills' Tyler Bass as Buffalo won 32–29. In contrast to the Miami home game being played in hot, humid weather, the Buffalo home game was played in winter conditions with heavy lake-effect snow falling.

The two teams played their first postseason matchup in the 20th century on January 15, 2023, in Buffalo. Despite Tagovailoa being out of action and the Bills being heavily favored as a result, the Dolphins played the Bills tightly, even overcoming a 17–0 second quarter deficit and briefly taking the lead in the third quarter, but Buffalo held on to win 34–31 after overcoming several miscues.

The following year, Buffalo beat Miami at home 48–20 on October 1, 2023, handing the Dolphins their first loss of the season one week after the latter scored 70 points on the Denver Broncos. In their subsequent Week 18 matchup, the teams were playing for the AFC East title, as the Bills had won four straight after being 6–6 while the Dolphins had lost two of their last four games after being once 9–3. Miami led at halftime 14–7 but were shut out in the second half while Buffalo scored the go-ahead touchdown with seven minutes remaining and recorded a last-minute interception to clinch a 21–14 victory. With the win, the Bills won their fourth straight division title and the number 2 seed in the AFC while Miami was relegated to being the sixth seed.

During the first matchup in 2024, which Buffalo won 31–10, Tagovailoa suffered another concussion after colliding helmet-first with Bills safety Damar Hamlin. Despite the animosity between the two teams and their fanbases, Bills fans donated to Tagovailoa's charity in a show of compassion. The Bills won again in their second 2024 meeting, 30–27, on a 61-yard field goal by Buffalo kicker Tyler Bass in the closing seconds. The win was the sixth in a row for the Bills in the rivalry.

Tagovailoa, McDaniel, Hill and fellow receiver Jaylen Waddle played their last game in the rivalry in 2025, upsetting the Bills 30–13 in November and ending another 7-game winning streak for Buffalo dating back to 2022. The four were traded or dismissed from the Dolphins organization following a second consecutive losing campaign in 2025, while Buffalo continued its streak of playoff appearances despite losing the division to New England for the first time since 2019. In the offseason, they fired their own head coach Sean McDermott and signed former Dolphins edge rusher Bradley Chubb.

== Characteristics ==
Iorfida wrote in 2008 that the Bills and Dolphins had "one of the stranger rivalries in sports" due to the differences between Buffalo and Miami. In 1980, The Miami News' Joe Crittenden referred to "the contrast between the two cities – Miami, the resort center in the subtropics and Buffalo, the snowfall capital of the east". He wrote that, when the Dolphins were building their 20-game winning streak in the 1970s, the differences contributed to the "intensity" of the rivalry. The CBC also noted the long distance between the teams' cities as an oddity. Despite this distance, they are both members of the AFC East, and have played at least two games per year since the Dolphins first joined the AFL. Games between the Bills and Dolphins were often significant in the league standings during the 1980s and 1990s, and Monday Night Football had nine games from the rivalry during the period.

The Bills–Dolphins rivalry has been called the most significant for Buffalo; Bakay, a Bills fan from the city, called Miami the Bills' "most hated divisional rival". In addition to their rivalry with the Bills, the Dolphins share one with the New York Jets, who "might be the most bitter foe for Miami", according to the CBC. Dolphins player Oliver offered a different assessment in 1993, saying "It's the biggest rivalry we have, us and Buffalo." In addition, both teams share rivalries with the New England Patriots.

== Connections between the teams ==
=== Coaches/executives ===
Name	Bills' tenure	Dolphins' tenure
Jahmile Addae	2024–2025, Cornerbacks coach	2026–present, Cornerbacks coach
Danny Crossman	2013–2018, Special teams coordinator	2019–2024, Special teams coordinator/Assistant head coach
Brian Daboll	2018–2021, Offensive coordinator	2011, Offensive coordinator
Joe Danna	2023–2025, Safeties coach 2026–present, Secondary coach	2010–2011, Assistant secondary coach
George Edwards	2010–2011, Defensive coordinator	2005–2009, 2012–2013, Linebackers coach
Chan Gailey	2010–2012, Head coach	2000–2001, 2020, Offensive coordinator
Dennis Hickey	2017–2021, Senior college scout	2014–2015, General manager
Mike Mularkey	2004–2005, Head coach	2006, Offensive coordinator 2007, Tight ends coach
Terry Robiskie	2018, Wide receivers coach	2007, Wide receivers coach
Bob Sanders	2009, Defensive line coach 2010–2011, Outside linebackers coach 2012, Linebackers coach	2001–2004, Linebackers coach
Joe Schoen	2017–2021, Assistant general manager	2008–2012, National scout 2013, Assistant director of college scouting 2014–2016, Director of player personnel
Mike Shula	2022–2023, Senior offensive assistant	1991–1992, Coaches' assistant 2000–2002, Quarterbacks coach
Eric Studesville	2004–2009, Running backs coach	2018–present, Running backs coach 2018–2020, Run game coordinator 2021, Co-offensive coordinator 2022–present, Associate head coach
Chris Tabor	2025, Special teams coordinator	2026–present, Special teams coordinator
Anthony Weaver	2013, Defensive line coach	2024–2025, Defensive coordinator
Dave Wannstedt	2011–2012, Associate head coach/Linebackers coach 2012, Defensive coordinator	1999, Associate head coach 2000–2004, Head coach

=== Players ===
Name	Position(s)	Bills' tenure	Dolphins' tenure
Kiko Alonso	Linebacker	2013–2014	2016–2018
Matt Breida	Running back	2021	2020
Marlin Briscoe	Quarterback, Wide receiver	1969–1971	1972–1974
Jim Braxton	Fullback	1971–1978	1978
Reggie Bush	Running back	2016	2011–2012
Dan Carpenter	Placekicker	2013–2016	2008–2012
Charles Clay	Tight end	2015–2018	2011–2014
Chase Claypool	Wide receiver	2024*	2023
Vontae Davis	Cornerback	2018	2009–2011
Matt Darr	Punter	2018	2015–2016
Tyrel Dodson	Linebacker	2019–2023	2024–present
Rasul Douglas	Cornerback	2023–2024	2025–present
Ryan Fitzpatrick	Quarterback	2009–2012	2019–2020
Robert Foster	Wide receiver	2018–2019	2021*
Frank Gore	Running back	2019	2018
MarQueis Gray	Tight end	2014–2015	2016–2018
Matt Haack	Punter	2021, 2023	2017–2020
Derek Hagan	Wide receiver	2006–2008	2011
Mack Hollins	Wide receiver	2024	2019–2021
Richie Incognito	Offensive guard	2009, 2015–2017	2010–2013
Duke Johnson	Running back	2022	2021
Matthew Judon	Linebacker	2025	2025
Shaq Lawson	Defensive end	2016–2019, 2022–23, 2025*	2020
J. P. Losman	Quarterback	2004–2008	2011
Greg Mancz	Center	2022–2023	2021
Siran Neal	Cornerback	2018–2023	2024
Nick O'Leary	Tight end	2015–2017	2018–2019
Jordan Phillips	Defensive tackle	2018–2019, 2022–2023, 2025–present*	2015–2018
Jordan Poyer	Safety	2017–2023, 2025–present	2024
Matt Prater	Placekicker	2025	2007*
Bacarri Rambo	Safety	2014–2015, 2017*	2016
Trent Sherfield	Wide receiver	2023	2022
Kenny Stills	Wide receiver	2020	2015-2018
Thurman Thomas	Running back	1988–1999	2000
Marcus Thigpen	Running back	2014–2015	2012–2013, 2014*
Tyler Thigpen	Quarterback	2011–2012	2009–2010
Troy Vincent	Cornerback	2004–2006	1992–1995
Mike White	Quarterback	2024	2023–2024
Mario Williams	Defensive end	2012–2015	2016

*Offseason and/or practice squad member only

== Season-by-season results ==
Buffalo Bills vs. Miami Dolphins Season-by-Season Results
1960s (Bills, 4–3–1)

Season	Season series	at Buffalo Bills	at Miami Dolphins	Overall series	Notes
1966	Bills 2–0	Bills; 58–24	Bills; 29–0	Bills; 2–0	Dolphins join the American Football League (AFL) as an expansion team. They are placed in the AFL Eastern Division, resulting in two meetings annually with the Bills. In Buffalo, the Bills score their most points in a game against the Dolphins and set a franchise record for their most points in a game.
1967	Tie 1–1	Bills; 35–13	Dolphins; 17–14	Bills; 3–1	
1968	Dolphins 1–0–1	Dolphins; 21–17	Tie; 14–14	Bills; 3–2–1	The Dolphins record their first tie in franchise history. In Buffalo, Dolphins overcame a 17–0 third quarter deficit.
1969	Tie 1–1	Bills; 28–3	Dolphins; 24–6	Bills; 4–3–1	

1970s (Dolphins, 20–0)

Season	Season series	at Buffalo Bills	at Miami Dolphins	Overall series	Notes
1970	Dolphins 2–0	Dolphins; 33–14	Dolphins; 45–7	Dolphins; 5–4–1	As a result of the AFL–NFL merger, the Bills and Dolphins are placed in the AFC East. Dolphins hire Don Shula as head coach. In Miami, the Dolphins recorded their largest victory over the Bills with a 38–point differential and scored their most points in a game against the Bills.
1971	Dolphins 2–0	Dolphins; 29–14	Dolphins; 34–0	Dolphins; 7–4–1	Dolphins lose Super Bowl VI.
1972	Dolphins 2–0	Dolphins; 30–16	Dolphins; 24–23	Dolphins; 9–4–1	Dolphins' 24–23 win in Miami was their closest margin of victory during their perfect season. Last matchup at War Memorial Stadium. Dolphins complete 17–0 season, win Super Bowl VII.
1973	Dolphins 2–0	Dolphins; 17–0	Dolphins; 27–6	Dolphins; 11–4–1	Bills open Rich Stadium (now known as Highmark Stadium). Dolphins win Super Bowl VIII.
1974	Dolphins 2–0	Dolphins; 24–16	Dolphins; 35–28	Dolphins; 13–4–1	
1975	Dolphins 2–0	Dolphins; 35–30	Dolphins; 31–21	Dolphins; 15–4–1	
1976	Dolphins 2–0	Dolphins; 30–21	Dolphins; 45–27	Dolphins; 17–4–1	In Miami, the Dolphins tied their most points scored in a game against the Bills.
1977	Dolphins 2–0	Dolphins; 13–0	Dolphins; 31–14	Dolphins; 19–4–1	
1978	Dolphins 2–0	Dolphins; 25–24	Dolphins; 31–24	Dolphins; 21–4–1	
1979	Dolphins 2–0	Dolphins; 9–7	Dolphins; 17–7	Dolphins; 23–4–1	Dolphins win 20 straight meetings (1970–1979), the longest win streak by one NFL team over another in NFL history.

1980s (Dolphins, 11–9)

Season	Season series	at Buffalo Bills	at Miami Dolphins	Overall series	Notes
1980	Tie 1–1	Bills; 17–7	Dolphins; 17–14	Dolphins; 24–5–1	Bills win against the Dolphins for the first time since the 1969 season.
1981	Tie 1–1	Bills; 31–21	Dolphins; 16–6	Dolphins; 25–6–1	Dolphins clinch the AFC East with their win while the Bills fell to the fifth-seeded wild card.
1982	Dolphins 2–0	Dolphins; 9–7	Dolphins; 27–10	Dolphins; 27–6–1	Both games are played despite players strike reducing season to 9 games. Dolphins win 14 straight home meetings (1969–1982). Dolphins lose Super Bowl XVII.
1983	Tie 1–1	Dolphins; 12–0	Bills; 38–35 (OT)	Dolphins; 28–7–1	Quarterbacks Jim Kelly and Dan Marino were drafted by the Bills and Dolphins respectively as part of QB class of 1983. Bills win in Miami for the first time since the 1966 season.
1984	Dolphins 2–0	Dolphins; 21–17	Dolphins; 38–7	Dolphins; 30–7–1	Dolphins lose Super Bowl XIX.
1985	Dolphins 2–0	Dolphins; 23–14	Dolphins; 28–0	Dolphins; 32–7–1	
1986	Dolphins 2–0	Dolphins; 34–24	Dolphins; 27–14	Dolphins; 34–7–1	Bills hire Marv Levy as head coach. First meeting between Kelly and Marino as Kelly joins Bills after a stint in the USFL. Last matchup at Miami Orange Bowl.
1987	Bills 2–0	Bills; 27–0	Bills; 34–31 (OT)	Dolphins; 34–9–1	Dolphins open Joe Robbie Stadium (now known as Hard Rock Stadium). In Miami, Bills overcame a 21–0 deficit and ended their 13-game road losing streak against divisional opponents with their win. Bills sweep the season series against the Dolphins for the first time since the 1966 season.
1988	Bills 2–0	Bills; 9–6	Bills; 31–6	Dolphins; 34–11–1	Starting with their home win, the Bills went on a 17-game home winning streak against divisional opponents.
1989	Bills 2–0	Bills; 31–17	Bills; 27–24	Dolphins; 34–13–1	In Miami, Jim Kelly scrambles for Buffalo's game-winning touchdown as time expires.

1990s (Bills, 15–9)

Season	Season series	at Buffalo Bills	at Miami Dolphins	Overall series	Notes
1990	Tie 1–1	Bills; 24–14	Dolphins; 30–7	Dolphins; 35–14–1	
1990 Playoffs	Bills 1–0	Bills; 44–34	—N/a	Dolphins; 35–15–1	AFC Divisional Round. Bills go on to lose Super Bowl XXV.
1991	Bills 2–0	Bills; 35–31	Bills; 41–27	Dolphins; 35–17–1	Bills lose Super Bowl XXVI.
1992	Tie 1–1	Dolphins; 37–10	Bills; 26–20	Dolphins; 36–18–1	Dolphins' win ended the Bills 17-game home winning streak against divisional opponents. Both teams finish with 11–5 records, but the Dolphins clinch the AFC East based on a better conference record.
1992 Playoffs	Bills 1–0	—N/a	Bills; 29–10	Dolphins; 36–19–1	AFC Championship Game. Bills go on to lose Super Bowl XXVII.
1993	Tie 1–1	Dolphins; 22–13	Bills; 47–34	Dolphins; 37–20–1	In Buffalo, Dolphins LB Bryan Cox famously flips the bird to Bills fans. Bills lose Super Bowl XXVIII.
1994	Bills 2–0	Bills; 21–11	Bills; 42–31	Dolphins; 37–22–1	
1995	Tie 1–1	Bills; 23–20	Dolphins; 23–6	Dolphins; 38–23–1	In Buffalo, Bills FB Carwell Gardner and Dolphins LB Bryan Cox were ejected for fighting.
1995 Playoffs	Bills 1–0	Bills; 37–22	—N/a	Dolphins; 38–24–1	AFC Wild Card Round. Don Shula's final game as Dolphins head coach.
1996	Dolphins 2–0	Dolphins; 21–7	Dolphins; 16–14	Dolphins; 40–24–1	Final season for Bills QB Jim Kelly.
1997	Tie 1–1	Bills; 9–6	Dolphins; 30–13	Dolphins; 41–25–1	Marv Levy's last season as Bills head coach.
1998	Tie 1–1	Bills; 30–24	Dolphins; 13–7	Dolphins; 42–26–1	Both teams finish with 10–6 records, but the Dolphins get the better playoff seed based on net division points, setting up a playoff matchup at Miami.
1998 Playoffs	Dolphins 1–0	—N/a	Dolphins; 24–17	Dolphins; 43–26–1	AFC Wild Card Round.
1999	Bills 2–0	Bills; 23–3	Bills; 23–18	Dolphins; 43–28–1	Final season for Dolphins' QB Dan Marino.

2000s (Tie, 10–10)

Season	Season series	at Buffalo Bills	at Miami Dolphins	Overall series	Notes
2000	Dolphins 2–0	Dolphins; 33–6	Dolphins; 22–13	Dolphins; 45–28–1	
2001	Dolphins 2–0	Dolphins; 34–27	Dolphins; 34–7	Dolphins; 47–28–1	The game in Miami was originally scheduled for Week 2 but was rescheduled to Week 17 following the September 11 attacks.
2002	Bills 2–0	Bills; 38–21	Bills; 23–10	Dolphins; 47–30–1	
2003	Dolphins 2–0	Dolphins; 20–3	Dolphins; 17–7	Dolphins; 49–30–1	
2004	Bills 2–0	Bills; 20–13	Bills; 42–32	Dolphins; 49–32–1	
2005	Tie 1–1	Bills; 20–14	Dolphins; 24–23	Dolphins; 50–33–1	In Miami, Dolphins overcome a 21–0 deficit.
2006	Bills 2–0	Bills; 21–0	Bills; 16–6	Dolphins; 50–35–1	Starting with their loss in Buffalo, the Dolphins went on a 16-game losing streak.
2007	Bills 2–0	Bills; 38–17	Bills; 13–10	Dolphins; 50–37–1	Dolphins' loss in Buffalo extended their losing streak to 16 games.
2008	Dolphins 2–0	Dolphins; 16–3*	Dolphins; 25–16	Dolphins; 52–37–1	Bills' home game was played at Rogers Centre in Toronto as part of the Bills Toronto Series.
2009	Tie 1–1	Bills; 31–14	Dolphins; 38–10	Dolphins; 53–38–1	

2010s (Bills, 12–8)

Season	Season series	at Buffalo Bills	at Miami Dolphins	Overall series	Notes
2010	Tie 1–1	Dolphins; 15–10	Bills; 17–14	Dolphins; 54–39–1	For the first time since the 1993 season, the road team won both games of the series.
2011	Dolphins 2–0	Dolphins; 30–23	Dolphins; 35–8	Dolphins; 56–39–1	
2012	Tie 1–1	Bills; 19–14	Dolphins; 24–10	Dolphins; 57–40–1	
2013	Bills 2–0	Bills; 19–0	Bills; 23–21	Dolphins; 57–42–1	In Miami, Bills' DE Mario Williams forces Dolphins' QB Ryan Tannehill to fumble, setting up a game-winning field goal.
2014	Tie 1–1	Bills; 29–10	Dolphins; 22–9	Dolphins; 58–43–1	
2015	Bills 2–0	Bills; 33–17	Bills; 41–14	Dolphins; 58–45–1	
2016	Dolphins 2–0	Dolphins; 34–31 (OT)	Dolphins; 28–25	Dolphins; 60–45–1	In Buffalo, Dolphins clinched a playoff berth with their win. Despite the loss, the Bills finished with 589 yards, setting a franchise record for their most yards in a game.
2017	Bills 2–0	Bills; 24–16	Bills; 22–16	Dolphins; 60–47–1	In Miami, a Bills victory, combined with a subsequent loss by the Ravens to the Bengals, gave the Bills a playoff berth for the first time since the 1999 season.
2018	Tie 1–1	Bills; 42–17	Dolphins; 21–17	Dolphins; 61–48–1	Bills draft QB Josh Allen. In Buffalo, a late hit on Allen from Dolphins' LB Kiko Alonso leads to a fight.
2019	Bills 2–0	Bills; 31–21	Bills; 37–20	Dolphins; 61–50–1	

2020s (Bills, 12–2)

Season	Season series	at Buffalo Bills	at Miami Dolphins	Overall series	Notes
2020	Bills 2–0	Bills; 56–26	Bills; 31–28	Dolphins; 61–52–1	In Buffalo, a victory by the Bills and a Colts win against the Jaguars eliminated the Dolphins from playoff contention. In addition, Bills sweep the AFC East for the first time in franchise history with their win.
2021	Bills 2–0	Bills; 26–11	Bills; 35–0	Dolphins; 61–54–1	In Miami, Bills record their largest victory over the Dolphins with a 35–point differential.
2022	Tie 1–1	Bills; 32–29	Dolphins; 21–19	Dolphins; 62–55–1	Bills clinched a playoff berth with their win.
2022 Playoffs	Bills 1–0	Bills; 34–31		Dolphins; 62–56–1	AFC Wild Card Round.
2023	Bills 2–0	Bills; 48–20	Bills; 21–14	Dolphins; 62–58–1	In Miami, Bills clinched the AFC East with their win while the Dolphins fell to the sixth seed. Both teams finished with 11–6 records, but the Bills clinched the AFC East based on their head-to-head sweep.
2024	Bills 2–0	Bills; 30–27	Bills; 31–10	Dolphins; 62–60–1	In Buffalo, Bills' kicker Tyler Bass kicks a game-winning 61-yard field goal with 10 seconds remaining in regulation.
2025	Tie 1–1	Bills; 31–21	Dolphins; 30–13	Dolphins; 63–61–1	
2026	Bills 1–0	Bills; 26–9	January 3	Dolphins; 63–62–1	Bills win 11 straight home meetings (2017–present).

Summary of Results

Season	Season series	at Buffalo Bills	at Miami Dolphins	Notes
AFL regular season	Bills 4–3–1	Bills 3–1	Dolphins 2–1–1	
NFL regular season	Dolphins 59–54	Bills 32–25	Dolphins 34–22	
AFL and NFL regular season	Dolphins 62–58–1	Bills 35–26	Dolphins 36–23–1	
NFL postseason	Bills 4–1	Bills 3–0	Tie 1–1	AFC Wild Card: 1995, 1998, 2022; AFC Divisional: 1990; AFC Championship: 1992
Regular and postseason	Dolphins 63–62–1	Bills 38–26	Dolphins 37–24–1	Bills are 1–0 at Rogers Centre in Toronto (2008), accounted for as a Bills home game.
