= Bryan Cox =

American football player and coach (born 1968)

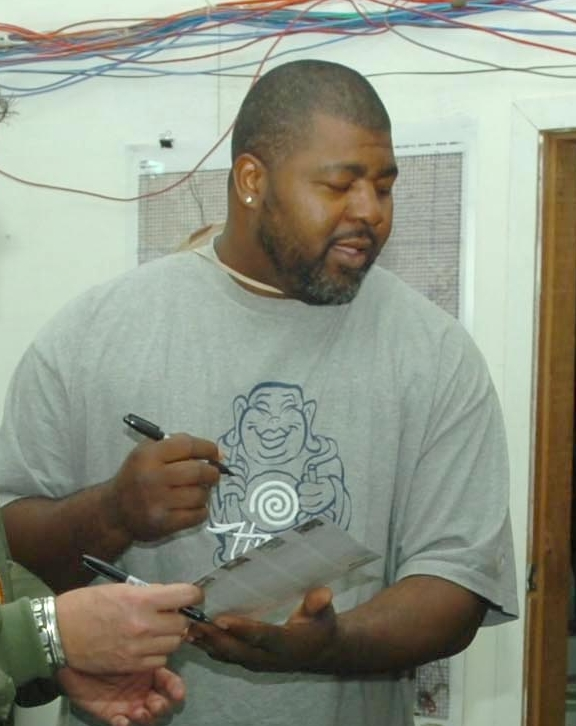
- Cox in Iraq, 2006

Profile
- Title: Linebacker

Personal information
- Born: February 17, 1968 (age 58); East St. Louis, Illinois, U.S.
- Listed height: 6 ft 4 in (1.93 m)
- Listed weight: 250 lb (113 kg)

Career information
- Position: Linebacker (No. 51, 52)
- High school: East St. Louis
- College: Western Illinois (1987–1990)
- NFL draft: 1991: 5th round, 113th overall pick

Career history

Playing
- Miami Dolphins (1991–1995); Chicago Bears (1996–1997); New York Jets (1998–2000); New England Patriots (2001); New Orleans Saints (2002)

Coaching
- New York Jets (2006–2008) Assistant defensive line coach; Cleveland Browns (2009–2010) Defensive line coach; Miami Dolphins (2011) Pass rush coach; Tampa Bay Buccaneers (2012–2013) Defensive line coach; Atlanta Falcons (2014–2016) Defensive line coach; New York Giants (2022–2025) Assistant defensive line coach

Awards and highlights
- As a player: Super Bowl champion (XXXVI); 3× Pro Bowl (1992, 1994, 1995)

Career NFL statistics
- Tackles: 939
- Sacks: 51.5
- Forced fumbles: 22
- Fumble recoveries: 15
- Pass deflections: 10
- Interceptions: 4
- Interception yards: 65
- Defensive touchdowns: 2
- Stats at Pro Football Reference

Bryan Keith Cox Sr. (born February 17, 1968) is a former American professional football coach and former player of the National Football League (NFL). He played as a linebacker in the NFL. He was a three-time Pro Bowl selection with the Miami Dolphins, and was a member of the New England Patriots team that won Super Bowl XXXVI.

Cox played college football for the Western Illinois Leathernecks, an FCS program that has developed other NFL talent, and received attention for his aggressive style of play. Although Cox was a relatively late fifth-round pick by the Dolphins in the 1991 NFL draft, he rose to prominence as a standout linebacker during his twelve NFL seasons from 1991 through 2002.

== Early life and college ==
Cox was a member of the East St. Louis High School Flyers high school football team, where he was coached by Bob Shannon.

Cox attended Western Illinois University and was a mass communications major and a letterman in football. In football, he was a four-year letterman and a two-year starter. As a senior, he was named as a first-team All-America selection by the Football Gazette and was a first-team all-conference selection. As a junior, he was named the Western Illinois Most Valuable Player. As a sophomore, Cox played in every game, and finished his sophomore season with 54 tackles, four forced fumbles, three fumble recoveries, two interceptions and three blocked kicks. As a freshman, Cox was a reserve nickel-back and finished the season with 30 tackles.

== Professional playing career ==
Cox was selected by the Dolphins in the fifth round of the 1991 NFL draft, chosen 113th overall. As a rookie, Cox started 13 games as the Dolphins right outside linebacker, racking up a total of 61 tackles along with two sacks. Miami finished out the season 8–8. In his sophomore campaign, Cox blossomed and helped lead the Dolphins to an 11–5 record and the AFC Championship Game. He made his first Pro Bowl and was named to the All Pro team after recording 127 tackles, 14 sacks and five forced fumbles. Miami switched to a 4–3 defense in 1993 and Cox was moved to right linebacker. The team started out 9–2, but lost their last five to miss the playoffs. Cox again led the team with 122 tackles, four forced fumbles and four fumble recoveries. He also collected five sacks and an interception.

Cox earned his second Pro Bowl selection in 1994, starting 16 games at middle linebacker, leading the team with 100 tackles. Miami finished the season 10–6, winning the Wild Card Game against the Kansas City Chiefs, 27–17 before losing the Divisional Playoff to the San Diego Chargers, 22–21. In 1995, Cox was selected to his second consecutive Pro Bowl, and third overall. He again started every game at middle linebacker, finishing the year with a team high 119 tackles, 7.5 sacks and three forced fumbles. The Dolphins went 9–7 before bowing out in the Wild Card Game to the Buffalo Bills, 37–22. The defense tied for the AFC lead by allowing only seven rushing touchdowns. Overall, Cox spent five years with the Dolphins playing both outside and middle linebacker, starting 75 out of a possible 78 games. While with Miami, Cox made his distaste towards division rival Buffalo widely known, giving the finger towards fans in 1993 and getting into a fistfight with Bills fullback Carwell Gardner in 1995. Both Gardner and Cox were ejected for the altercation. On his way back to the locker room, Cox repeatedly spit into the air, intended as gesture to the heckling Buffalo fans.

Cox went on to play seven more seasons in the NFL for the Chicago Bears, New York Jets, New England Patriots, and New Orleans Saints. In a career encompassing 165 games, Cox recorded 764 tackles, tallied 51.5 quarterback sacks, caught four interceptions and forced 22 fumbles. Among his most famous plays was a 27-yard interception-return touchdown against the Patriots in September 1999 while playing with the Jets; another famous play came with the Patriots in September 2001 in a game against the Indianapolis Colts; Cox hit receiver Jerome Pathon in the first quarter, a hit that briefly knocked Pathon out.

Throughout his NFL career, Cox was easily recognizable on the field due to the unusual headrest- or "surfboard"-style neck roll he wore and colored to match his uniform jersey.

== NFL career statistics ==
Legend
	Super Bowl champion
**Bold**	Career high

=== Regular season ===
Year	Team	Games		Tackles				Interceptions			Fumbles	
Year	Team	GP	GS	Cmb	Solo	Ast	Sck	Int	Yds	TD	FF	FR
1991	MIA	13	13	61	–	–	2.0	0	0	0	0	0
1992	MIA	**16**	**16**	**127**	–	–	**14.0**	**1**	0	0	**5**	1
1993	MIA	**16**	**16**	122	–	–	4.0	**1**	26	0	4	**4**
1994	MIA	**16**	**16**	100	75	25	3.0	0	0	0	2	0
1995	MIA	**16**	**16**	119	**95**	24	7.5	**1**	12	0	3	1
1996	CHI	9	9	59	45	14	3.0	0	0	0	1	3
1997	CHI	**16**	15	101	68	**33**	5.0	0	0	0	1	1
1998	NYJ	**16**	10	70	48	22	6.0	0	0	0	1	0
1999	NYJ	12	11	46	32	14	0.0	**1**	**27**	**1**	2	1
2000	NYJ	15	14	81	55	26	6.0	0	0	0	3	3
2001	NE	11	7	49	34	15	0.0	0	0	0	0	1
2002	NO	9	1	4	3	1	0.0	0	0	0	0	0
Career		165	144	939	455	174	51.5	4	65	1	22	15

== Post-playing career ==
From 2004 to 2005 he worked as an analyst for TVG Network. Cox also co-hosted an afternoon drive radio program for Fox Sports Radio in 2006 alongside Chris Myers. Cox was a football analyst on FS1 in 2018.

=== Coaching career ===
He was an assistant defensive line coach for the New York Jets for three seasons (2006–2008) under Eric Mangini. After Mangini was fired and became the coach of the Cleveland Browns in January 2009, he brought Cox with him, where Cox was the defensive line coach.

On February 21, 2011, Cox was hired by the Miami Dolphins as their pass rush coach.

On February 17, 2012, Cox was hired to become a defensive assistant at the Tampa Bay Buccaneers. He was hired the same day as Bill Sheridan.

On January 11, 2014, Cox was hired by the Atlanta Falcons as their defensive line coach.In the 2016 season, Cox and the Falcons reached Super Bowl LI on February 5, 2017. Against the New England Patriots, the Falcons would fall in a 34–28 overtime defeat. On February 8, 2017, the Atlanta Falcons relieved Cox of his duties as the defensive line coach.

On February 16, 2022, Cox joined the New York Giants as a defensive line assistant. He was let go from the organization on December 10, 2025 following an alleged dispute over seating arrangements on the team plane.

== Personal life ==
Cox was born in East Saint Louis, Illinois to Ronald Cox and Nancy Mathis. He has five siblings, Christopher, Pamela, Anthony, Tonya and Junius Cox.

He is married to Kim Brown and has five children Bryan Cox Jr., Brittani Cox, Lavonda Cox, Chiquita Cox, and Kelli Cox.

Bryan's son, Bryan Cox Jr., played football as a defensive lineman for the Florida Gators and was a member of the Carolina Panthers practice squad, but got promoted to the active roster in late September 2017. He signed with the Cleveland Browns on November 13, 2019. On April 29, 2020, he signed with the Buffalo Bills, who were ironically his father's most-hated rival., and in February 2025, signed with the nearby CFL Toronto Argonauts, after two seasons with Saskatchewan Roughriders.
