= Joe Danna =

American football coach (born 1977)

Buffalo Bills
- Title: Secondary coach

Personal information
- Born: April 3, 1977 (age 49); Midland, Michigan, U.S.

Career information
- Position: Wide receiver
- High school: Midland (MI)
- College: Central Michigan

Career history
- Central Michigan (1999–2000) Student assistant; Georgia (2001) Graduate assistant; Central Michigan (2002–2005); Wide receivers coach (2002, 2005); Secondary coach (2003–2004); Georgia Southern (2006) Defensive backs coach; James Madison (2007) Defensive backs coach; Atlanta Falcons (2008–2009) Defensive quality control coach; Miami Dolphins (2010–2011) Assistant secondary coach; Atlanta Falcons (2012–2014) Defensive backs coach; New York Jets (2015–2016) Defensive backs coach; Jacksonville Jaguars (2017–2021); Assistant defensive backs coach (2017–2018); Defensive backs coach (2019–2020); Nickels coach (2021); Houston Texans (2022) Safeties coach; Buffalo Bills (2023–present); Safeties coach (2023–2025); Secondary coach (2026–present)

Joe Danna (born April 3, 1977) is an American football coach who is the secondary coach for the Buffalo Bills of the National Football League (NFL). He served as the safeties coach for the Bills from 2023 to 2025, prior to being promoted to his current position.

== Career ==
Danna, who played wide receiver for Central Michigan University (CMU) from 1995 to 1998, began his coaching career at his alma mater as a graduate assistant after earning a bachelor of science in elementary education. He returned to CMU for a four-year coaching stint from 2002 to 2005. He served on collegiate coaching staffs at the University of Georgia (2001), Georgia Southern University (2006), James Madison University (2007).

In 2008, Danna joined the Atlanta Falcons of the National Football League, serving as a defensive assistant for head coach Mike Smith. He served as the assistant secondary coach for head coach Tony Sparano for the 2010 and 2011 seasons with the Miami Dolphins. Danna returned to coach Smith's staff in 2012 with the Falcons and served as the defensive backs coach for three years. In 2015, Danna was hired by Todd Bowles of the New York Jets to serve as the defensive backs coach. He was hired by Doug Marrone to be assistant defensive backs coach for the Jacksonville Jaguars in 2017. He was promoted to safeties coach in 2019 and served in the position through 2020. For the 2021 season, Danna was retained by new head coach Urban Meyer as the nickels coach. In 2022, Danna was hired by Lovie Smith to serve as the safeties coach for the Houston Texans.

On February 2, 2023, Danna was hired to serve as safeties coach for the Buffalo Bills. After three seasons in that position, Danna was retained by new head coach Joe Brady for the 2026 season. Danna was promoted to become the team's new secondary coach.
