= 2010 Miami Dolphins season =

45th season in franchise history

- General manager: Jeff Ireland
- Head coach: Tony Sparano
- Home stadium: Sun Life Stadium

Results
- Record: 7–9
- Division place: 3rd AFC East
- Playoffs: Did not qualify
- Pro Bowlers: OT Jake Long; OLB Cameron Wake; DE Randy Starks; LS John Denney

The 2010 season was the Miami Dolphins' 41st in the National Football League (NFL), their 45th overall and their third under head coach Tony Sparano. The Dolphins matched their 7–9 record from 2009, and placed in third in the AFC East.

== Offseason personnel moves ==
=== Staff Changes ===
In September 2010, Bill Parcells, stepped down as Vice President of Football Operations, but remaining as a consultant. He was later criticised for not making the right choices to improve the team.

The Dolphins lost their first coach of the offseason—outside linebackers coach Jim Reid—on January 8, when Reid was named defensive coordinator and associated head coach under Mike London at the University of Virginia.

That same week, inside linebackers coach George Edwards was named defensive coordinator at the University of Florida under Urban Meyer and acting head coach Steve Addazio. He would later go on to fill the Buffalo Bills' defensive coordinator position. On January 11, the Dolphins fired defensive coordinator Paul Pasqualoni after the team finished 25th in the league in points allowed during the season. He was quickly replaced by former Denver Broncos defensive coordinator, Mike Nolan, less than 24 hours after resigning his post in Denver. Former New York Giants defensive coordinator Bill Sheridan was named linebackers coach to replace both Edwards and Reid.

=== Players ===
==== Re-signings ====
- June 17 — Re-signed linebacker Tim Dobbins to a two-year extension.
- June 18 — Re-signed punter Brandon Fields to a two-year extension, and signed long snapper John Denney to a three-year extension.
- July 27 — Re-signed kicker Dan Carpenter to a three-year extension.
- August 6 – Re-signed tight end David Martin. Martin had missed the entire 2009 season with a knee injury, and was released from the team in December.
- August 16 – Re-signed defensive end/outside linebacker Ikaika Alama-Francis to a one-year extension.

==== Signings ====
- March 5 – Signed linebacker Karlos Dansby (Arizona Cardinals).
- March 17 – Signed guard Richie Incognito (Buffalo Bills).
- May 20 – Signed linebacker Zach Thomas to a one-day contract (Kansas City Chiefs).
- May 24 – Signed Offensive Lineman Cory Procter (Dallas Cowboys).
- July 25 – Signed defensive tackle Montavious Stanley (Jacksonville Jaguars).
- July 27 – Signed defensive end Marques Douglas (New York Jets).
- July 30 – Signed defensive end Charles Grant (New Orleans Saints).
- September 6 – Signed inside linebacker Bobby Carpenter (St. Louis Rams).
- September 8 – Signed running back/kick returner Clifton Smith (Tampa Bay Buccaneers).
- September 21 – Signed tight end Jeron Mastrud from the practice squad.

==== Departures ====
- March 5 – Released linebackers Joey Porter, Akin Ayodele and safety Gibril Wilson.
- May 20 – Announced the retirement of linebacker Zach Thomas.
- May 27 – Terminated the contract of linebacker Reggie Torbor.
- July 15 – Announced the retirement of defensive tackle Jason Ferguson.
- September 4 – Released quarterback Pat White, guard Donald Thomas, tight end David Martin and wide receiver Patrick Turner among final roster cuts.
- September 5 – Released defensive ends Marques Douglas and Charles Grant.
- September 6 – Terminated the contract of outside linebacker Charlie Anderson.
- September 8 – Terminated the contract of center Jake Grove.

==== Trades ====
- April 14 – Traded a 2nd round selection in the 2010 NFL draft (43rd overall, traded to Baltimore – Sergio Kindle) and the 2011 NFL draft for Denver Broncos wide receiver Brandon Marshall.
- April 16 – Traded wide receiver Ted Ginn Jr. to the San Francisco 49ers for a fifth round selection in the 2010 NFL draft (145th overall – Nolan Carroll).
- April 22 – Traded the 12th overall selection (Ryan Mathews), a 4th round selection (110th overall, Darrell Stuckey), and a 6th round selection (173rd overall, traded to San Francisco – Anthony Dixon) in the 2010 NFL draft to the San Diego Chargers for the 28th overall selection (Jared Odrick), a 2nd round selection (40th overall, Koa Misi), a 4th round selection (126th overall, traded to Dallas – Akwasi Owusu-Ansah) and linebacker Tim Dobbins.
- May 24 – Traded guard Justin Smiley to the Jacksonville Jaguars for a 7th round selection in the 2011 NFL draft.
- August 25 – Traded wide receiver Greg Camarillo to the Minnesota Vikings for cornerback Benny Sapp.
- September 3 – Acquired offensive tackle Pat McQuistan from the Dallas Cowboys for a conditional 7th-round draft choice in the 2011 NFL draft.

==== 2010 NFL draft ====
After finishing the 2009 season with a record of 7–9, the Dolphins were slotted for the 12th overall pick in the draft. However, on draft day, they ended up trading down with San Diego for the No.28 pick.

Draft		Name	Position	College	Height	Weight
Rnd	Pick	Name	Position	College	Height	Weight
1	28	Jared Odrick	DE	Penn State	6'5"	296
2	40	Koa Misi	OLB	Utah	6'3"	251
3	73	John Jerry	G	Ole Miss	6'5"	328
4	119	A. J. Edds	ILB	Iowa	6'4"	246
5	145	Nolan Carroll	CB	Maryland	5'11"	204
5	163	Reshad Jones	FS	Georgia	6'1"	214
7	212	Chris McCoy	OLB	Middle Tennessee	6'3"	251
7	252	Austin Spitler	ILB	Ohio State	6'3"	234

Notes

- Miami traded their 2010 first-round pick (12th overall), a fourth-round selection (110th overall), and a sixth-round selection it acquired from Kansas City (173rd overall) to San Diego for a first-round selection (28th overall), a second-round selection it acquired from Seattle (40th overall), a fourth-round selection (126th overall), and linebacker Tim Dobbins.
- Miami traded their second-round pick (43rd overall) and its 2011 second-round selection to Denver for wide receiver Brandon Marshall.
- Miami traded their fifth-round pick (142nd overall) to Kansas City for quarterback Tyler Thigpen.
- San Francisco traded their fifth-round pick (145th overall) to Miami for wide receiver Ted Ginn Jr.
- Kansas City traded their sixth-round pick (173rd overall) to Miami for offensive linemen Andy Alleman and Ikechuku Ndukwe.
- Washington traded their sixth-round pick (174th overall) and a 2009 second-round selection (44th overall) to Miami for defensive end Jason Taylor.
- Kansas City traded their seventh-round pick (212th) to Miami for a 2009 seventh-round selection (237th overall).
- Seventh-round pick (252nd overall) is a compensatory pick.
- Washington traded their fifth-round pick (163rd overall) to Miami for a sixth-round selection (174th overall) and a seventh-round selection (219th overall).

== Staff ==
Miami Dolphins 2010 staff
Front office: Chairman/managing general partner – Stephen Ross; Vice chairman/partner – Jorge Perez; Vice chairman – Don Shula; CEO – Mike Dee; General manager – Jeff Ireland; Senior vice president of football operations – Dawn Aponte; Assistant director of player personnel – Brian Gaine; Director of college scouting – Chris Grier; Head coaches: Head coach – Tony Sparano; Assistant head coach/secondary – Todd Bowles; Offensive coaches: Offensive coordinator – Dan Henning; Quarterbacks – David Lee; Running backs – James Saxon; Wide receivers – Karl Dorrell; Tight ends – George DeLeone; Offensive line – Dave DeGuglielmo; Offensive quality control – Steve Bush; Coaching intern/offense – Dan Campbell	Defensive coaches: Defensive coordinator – Mike Nolan; Defensive line – Kacy Rodgers; Linebackers – Bill Sheridan; Assistant secondary – Joe Danna; Defensive quality control/assistant linebackers – David Corrao; Special teams coaches: Special teams coordinator – John Bonamego fired on October 5th; Assistant special teams coordinator – Darren Rizzi; Strength and conditioning: Head strength and conditioning – Evan Marcus; Assistant strength and conditioning – David Puloka

Team Captains

Yeremiah Bell, Patrick Cobbs, Karlos Dansby, and Jake Long.

== Roster ==
2010 Miami Dolphins roster
Quarterbacks (QB): 7 Chad Henne; 16 Tyler Thigpen; Running backs (RB): 23 Ronnie Brown; 38 Patrick Cobbs; 26 Lex Hilliard; 36 Lousaka Polite FB; 34 Ricky Williams; Wide receivers (WR): 15 Davone Bess PR; 19 Brandon Marshall; 14 Marlon Moore; 11 Julius Pruitt; 18 Roberto Wallace; Tight ends (TE): 81 Dedrick Epps; 80 Anthony Fasano; 88 Jeron Mastrud; 86 Mickey Shuler	Offensive linemen (OL): 73 Allen Barbre G; 67 Joe Berger C; 69 Ray Feinga G; 68 Richie Incognito G; 74 John Jerry G; 61 Matt Kopa T; 77 Jake Long T; 79 Pat McQuistan G; 76 Lydon Murtha T; Defensive linemen (DL): 95 Chris Baker NT; 90 Ryan Baker DE; 70 Kendall Langford DE; 78 Tony McDaniel NT; 97 Phillip Merling DE; 96 Paul Soliai NT; 94 Randy Starks DE	Linebackers (LB): 59 Ikaika Alama-Francis OLB; 52 Channing Crowder ILB; 51 Tim Dobbins ILB; 55 Koa Misi OLB; 93 Quentin Moses OLB; 57 Mike Rivera OLB; 53 Austin Spitler ILB; 91 Cameron Wake OLB; Defensive backs (DB): 40 Jonathon Amaya SS; 37 Yeremiah Bell SS; 28 Nolan Carroll CB/KR; 30 Chris Clemons FS; 29 Tyrone Culver SS; 21 Vontae Davis CB; 20 Reshad Jones FS; 32 Nate Ness CB; 27 Benny Sapp CB; 24 Sean Smith CB; Special teams (ST): 5 Dan Carpenter K; 92 John Denney LS; 2 Brandon Fields P	Practice squad: 3 Tom Brandstater QB; 17 Patrick Carter WR; 87 Brooks Foster WR; 44 Mortty Ivy LB; 31 Terrail Lambert CB; 71 James Marten T; 56 Robert Rose DE; Reserve: 25 Will Allen CB (IR); 33 Deon Anderson FB (IR); 72 Vernon Carey T (IR); 58 Karlos Dansby ILB (IR); -- Lionel Dotson DT (IR); 49 A. J. Edds ILB (IR); 75 Nate Garner G (IR); 82 Brian Hartline WR (IR); -- Joey Haynos TE (IR); 98 Jared Odrick DE (IR); 10 Chad Pennington QB (IR); -- Cory Procter C (IR); 22 Kory Sheets RB (IR); Rookies in italics 53 active, 13 reserve, 7 practice squad

== Schedule ==
=== Preseason ===
The Dolphins preseason schedule was announced on March 31, 2010.

Week	Date	Opponent	Result	Record	Game site	NFL.com recap
1	August 14	Tampa Bay Buccaneers	W 10–7	1–0	Sun Life Stadium	Recap
2	August 21	at Jacksonville Jaguars	W 27–26	2–0	EverBank Field	Recap
3	August 27	Atlanta Falcons	L 6–16	2–1	Sun Life Stadium	Recap
4	September 2	at Dallas Cowboys	L 25–27	2–2	Cowboys Stadium	Recap

=== Regular season ===
The 2010 regular season schedule was announced on April 20, 2010.

Week	Date	Opponent	Result	Record	Game site	NFL.com recap
1	September 12	at Buffalo Bills	W 15–10	1–0	Ralph Wilson Stadium	Recap
2	September 19	at Minnesota Vikings	W 14–10	2–0	Mall of America Field	Recap
3	September 26	New York Jets	L 23–31	2–1	Sun Life Stadium	Recap
4	October 4	New England Patriots	L 14–41	2–2	Sun Life Stadium	Recap
5	Bye					
6	October 17	at Green Bay Packers	W 23–20 (OT)	3–2	Lambeau Field	Recap
7	October 24	Pittsburgh Steelers	L 22–23	3–3	Sun Life Stadium	Recap
8	October 31	at Cincinnati Bengals	W 22–14	4–3	Paul Brown Stadium	Recap
9	November 7	at Baltimore Ravens	L 10–26	4–4	M&T Bank Stadium	Recap
10	November 14	Tennessee Titans	W 29–17	5–4	Sun Life Stadium	Recap
11	November 18	Chicago Bears	L 0–16	5–5	Sun Life Stadium	Recap
12	November 28	at Oakland Raiders	W 33–17	6–5	Oakland–Alameda County Coliseum	Recap
13	December 5	Cleveland Browns	L 10–13	6–6	Sun Life Stadium	Recap
14	December 12	at New York Jets	W 10–6	7–6	New Meadowlands Stadium	Recap
15	December 19	Buffalo Bills	L 14–17	7–7	Sun Life Stadium	Recap
16	December 26	Detroit Lions	L 27–34	7–8	Sun Life Stadium	Recap
17	January 2	at New England Patriots	L 7–38	7–9	Gillette Stadium	Recap

== Standings ==
AFC East
	W	L	T	PCT	DIV	CONF	PF	PA	STK
^{(1)} New England Patriots	14	2	0	.875	5–1	10–2	518	313	W8
^{(6)} New York Jets	11	5	0	.688	4–2	9–3	367	304	W1
Miami Dolphins	7	9	0	.438	2–4	5–7	273	333	L3
Buffalo Bills	4	12	0	.250	1–5	3–9	283	425	L2

=== Conference ===
AFC
#	Team	Division	W	L	T	PCT	DIV	CONF	SOS	SOV	STK
Division winners
1	New England Patriots	East	14	2	0	.875	5–1	10–2	.504	.504	W8
2 (Note: Pittsburgh clinched the AFC North title instead of Baltimore based on division record (5–1 to Baltimore's 4–2).)	Pittsburgh Steelers	North	12	4	0	.750	5–1	9–3	.500	.417	W2
3 (Note: Indianapolis clinched the AFC No. 3 seed instead of Kansas City based on a head-to-head victory.)	Indianapolis Colts	South	10	6	0	.625	4–2	8–4	.473	.425	W4
4	Kansas City Chiefs	West	10	6	0	.625	2–4	6–6	.414	.381	L1
Wild cards
5	Baltimore Ravens	North	12	4	0	.750	4–2	9–3	.484	.422	W4
6	New York Jets	East	11	5	0	.688	4–2	9–3	.492	.409	W1
Did not qualify for the postseason
7	San Diego Chargers	West	9	7	0	.563	3–3	7–5	.457	.410	W1
8 (Note: Jacksonville finished ahead of Oakland based on head-to-head victory.)	Jacksonville Jaguars	South	8	8	0	.500	3–3	7–5	.453	.383	L3
9	Oakland Raiders	West	8	8	0	.500	6–0	6–6	.469	.469	W1
10	Miami Dolphins	East	7	9	0	.438	2–4	5–7	.539	.438	L3
11 (Note: Houston finished ahead of Tennessee in the AFC South based on division record (3–3 to Tennessee's 2–4).)	Houston Texans	South	6	10	0	.375	3–3	5–7	.523	.500	W1
12	Tennessee Titans	South	6	10	0	.375	2–4	3–9	.508	.500	L2
13	Cleveland Browns	North	5	11	0	.313	1–5	3–9	.570	.475	L4
14 (Note: Denver finished ahead of Buffalo and Cincinnati based on strength of victory.)	Denver Broncos	West	4	12	0	.250	1–5	3–9	.516	.453	L1
15 (Note: Buffalo finished ahead of Cincinnati based on head-to-head victory.)	Buffalo Bills	East	4	12	0	.250	1–5	3–9	.578	.344	L2
16	Cincinnati Bengals	North	4	12	0	.250	2–4	3–9	.582	.438	L1
Tiebreakers (Note: When breaking ties for three or more teams under the NFL's rules, they are first broken within divisions, then comparing only the highest ranked remaining team from each division.)

== Game results ==
=== Week 1: at Buffalo Bills ===
Week 1: Miami Dolphins at Buffalo Bills – Game summary

Quarter	1	2	3	4	Total
Dolphins	3	7	0	5	15
Bills	0	3	0	7	10

at Ralph Wilson Stadium, Orchard Park, New York

- Date: September 12
- Game time: 1:00 p.m. EDT
- Game weather: 62 °F (17 °C) (Cloudy)
- Game attendance: 69,295
- Referee: Clete Blakeman
- TV announcers (CBS): Gus Johnson and Steve Tasker
- http://www.nfl.com/gamecenter/2010091201/2010/REG1/dolphins@bills

Game information

First quarter

- MIA – Dan Carpenter 32-yard field goal, Dolphins 3–0, Drive: 10 plays, 45 yards, 5:54.

Second quarter

- MIA – Ronnie Brown 1-yard run (Dan Carpenter kick), Dolphins 10–0, Drive: 11 plays, 65 yards, 5:09.
- BUF – Rian Lindell 51-yard field goal, Dolphins 10–3, Drive: 8 plays, 27 yards, 4:04.

Third quarter

- No scoring plays.

Fourth quarter

- MIA – Dan Carpenter 32-yard field goal, Dolphins 13–3, Drive: 10 plays, 45 yards, 5:54.
- BUF – Roscoe Parrish 31-yard reception from Trent Edwards (Rian Lindell kick), Dolphins 13–10, Drive: 10 plays, 80 yards, 4:19
- MIA – Garrison Sanborn fumble out of bounds for Safety, Dolphins 15–10

Top passers

- MIA – Chad Henne – 21/34, 182 yards
- BUF – Trent Edwards – 18/34, 139 yards, 1 TD

Top rushers

- MIA – Ronnie Brown – 13 rushes, 65 yards, 1 TD
- BUF – Fred Jackson – 4 rushes, 19 yards

Top receivers

- MIA – Brandon Marshall – 8 receptions, 53 yards
- BUF – Stevie Johnson – 3 receptions, 40 yards

Top tacklers

- MIA – Yeremiah Bell – 6 tackles, 2 assists
- BUF – Drayton Florence – 9 tackles, 1 assist

The Miami Dolphins began their season at Ralph Wilson Stadium for an AFC East duel with the Buffalo Bills. In the first quarter, Miami struck first when kicker Dan Carpenter nailed a 32-yard field goal, which was increased in the second quarter when running back Ronnie Brown got a 1-yard TD run. The Bills replied when kicker Rian Lindell made a 51-yard field goal. In the fourth quarter, Miami scored first with Carpenter hitting a 43-yard field goal. Then, the Bills replied with quarterback Trent Edwards making a 31-yard touchdown pass to wide receiver Roscoe Parrish. The final score was made when long snapper Garrison Sanborn fumbled out of bounds for a safety.

With the win, the Dolphins began the season at 1–0.

=== Week 2: at Minnesota Vikings ===
Week 2: Miami Dolphins at Minnesota Vikings – Game summary

Quarter	1	2	3	4	Total
Dolphins	7	0	7	0	14
Vikings	0	0	7	3	10

at Mall of America Field at the Hubert H. Humphrey Metrodome, Minneapolis, Minnesota

- Date: September 19
- Game time: 1:00 p.m. EDT/12:00 p.m. CDT
- Game weather: None (dome stadium)
- Game attendance: 63,846
- Referee: Mike Carey
- TV announcers (CBS): Greg Gumbel and Dan Dierdorf
- http://www.nfl.com/gamecenter/2010091902/2010/REG2/dolphins@vikings

Game information

First quarter

- MIA – Brian Hartline 5-yard pass form Chad Henne (Dan Carpenter kick), Dolphins 7–0, Drive: 10 plays, 45 yards, 5:54.

Second quarter

Third quarter

- MIA – Koa Misi fumble recovery in endzone (Dan Carpenter kick), Dolphins 14–0,
- MIN – Adrian Peterson 1-yard run (Ryan Longwell kick), Dolphins 14–7, Drive: 2 plays, 1 yards, 0:10.

Fourth quarter

- MIN – Ryan Longwell 28-yard field goal, Dolphins 14–10, Drive: 13 plays, 78 yards, 6:49.

Top passers

- MIA – Chad Henne – 9/15, 114 yards, 1 touchdown
- MIN – Brett Favre – 22/36, 225 yards, 3 interceptions

Top rushers

- MIA – Ronnie Brown – 13 rushes, 80 yards
- MIN – Adrian Peterson – 28 rushes, 145 yards, 1 touchdown

Top receivers

- MIA – Brandon Marshall – 4 receptions, 71 yards
- MIN – Visanthe Shiancoe – 6 receptions, 86 yards

Top tacklers

- MIA – Yeremiah Bell – 9 tackles, 3 assists
- MIN – E.J. Henderson – 5 tackles, 2 assists, 1 forced fumble

Hoping to increase their winning streak, the Dolphins flew to Mall of America Field at Hubert H. Humphrey Metrodome for an interconference duel with the Vikings. In the first quarter, the Dolphins got the early lead as QB Chad Henne made a 5-yard TD pass to WR Brian Hartline. In the third quarter, the Dolphins increased their lead when LB Koa Misi recovered a fumble in the endzone for a touchdown, but Minnesota scored with RB Adrian Peterson completing a 1-yard TD run. The Vikings tried to fight back in the 4th quarter with kicker Ryan Longwell nailing a 28-yard field goal, but Miami's defense prevented anything else from happening, giving Miami a win. It was the Dolphins' first road win over the Vikings since 1979.

With the win, Miami improved to 2–0.

=== Week 3: vs. New York Jets ===
Week 3: New York Jets at Miami Dolphins – Game summary

Quarter	1	2	3	4	Total
Jets	7	7	7	10	31
Dolphins	0	10	10	3	23

at Sun Life Stadium, Miami Gardens, Florida

- Date: September 26
- Game time: 8:20 p.m. EDT
- Game weather: 83 °F (28 °C) (Cloudy)
- Game attendance: 70,481
- Referee: Jerome Boger
- TV announcers (NBC): Al Michaels, Cris Collinsworth and Andrea Kremer
- http://www.nfl.com/gamecenter/2010092614/2010/REG3/jets@dolphins

Game information

First quarter

- NYJ – Dustin Keller 24-yard pass from Mark Sanchez (Nick Folk kick), Jets 7–0, Drive: 10 plays, 72 yards, 5:43.

Second quarter

- NYJ – Dustin Keller 12-yard pass from Mark Sanchez (Nick Folk kick), Jets 14–0, Drive: 7 plays, 90 yards, 4:07.
- MIA – Anthony Fasano 3-yard pass from Chad Henne (Dan Carpenter kick), Jets 14–7, Drive: 9 plays, 76 yards, 4:21.
- MIA – Dan Carpenter 44-yard field goal, Jets 14–10, Drive: 12 plays, 59 yards, 6:23.

Third quarter

- MIA – Brandon Marshall 11-yard pass from Chad Henne (Dan Carpenter kick), Dolphins 17–14, Drive: 12 plays, 73 yards, 6:13.
- NYJ – Braylon Edwards 67-yard pass from Mark Sanchez (Nick Folk kick), Jets 21–17, Drive: 1 plays, 67 yards, 0:18.
- MIA – Dan Carpenter 20-yard field goal, Jets 21–20, Drive: 8 plays, 73 yards, 3:15.

Fourth quarter

- NYJ – Nick Folk 30-yard field goal, Jets 24–20, Drive: 8 plays, 5 yards, 4:10.
- MIA – Dan Carpenter 50-yard field goal, Jets 24–23, Drive: 6 plays, 18 yards, 2:14.
- NYJ – LaDainian Tomlinson 1-yard run (Nick Folk kick), Jets 31–21, Drive: 12 plays, 80 yards, 4:47.

Top passers

- NYJ – Mark Sanchez – 15/28, 253 yards, 3 touchdowns
- MIA – Chad Henne – 26/44, 363 yards, 2 touchdowns, 1 interception

Top rushers

- NYJ – LaDainian Tomlinson – 15 rushes, 70 yards, 1 touchdown
- MIA – Ronnie Brown – 11 rushes, 54 yards

Top receivers

- NYJ – Dustin Keller – 6 receptions, 98 yards, 2 touchdowns
- MIA – Brandon Marshall – 10 receptions, 166 yards, 1 touchdown

Top tacklers

- NYJ – David Harris – 7 tackles
- MIA – Yeremiah Bell – 8 tackles, 1 assist

Coming off their win over the Vikings, the Dolphins went home, donned their alternate uniforms, and played their Week 3 home-opener against their AFC East foe, the New York Jets, on Sunday night. Miami trailed early in the first quarter as Jets quarterback Mark Sanchez completed a 24-yard touchdown pass to tight end Dustin Keller. The Dolphins' deficit would increase in the second quarter as Sanchez hooked up with Keller again on a 3-yard touchdown pass. Miami would respond with quarterback Chad Henne completing a 3-yard touchdown pass to tight end Anthony Fasano, followed by kicker Dan Carpenter making a 44-yard field goal.

The Dolphins would take the lead in the third quarter as Henne connected with wide receiver Brandon Marshall on an 11-yard touchdown pass, but New York would immediately respond as Sanchez found wide receiver Braylon Edwards on a 67-yard touchdown pass. Miami would answer with Carpenter's 20-yard field goal. In the fourth quarter, the Jets would add onto their lead as kicker Nick Folk got a 30-yard field goal. The Dolphins would chip away as their deficit as Carpenter booted a 50-yard field goal, but New York would pull away as running back LaDainian Tomlinson got a 1-yard touchdown run. Miami tried to rally, but the Jets' defense held on for the win.

With the loss, the Dolphins fell to 2–1.

=== Week 4: vs. New England Patriots ===
Week 4: New England Patriots at Miami Dolphins – Game summary

Quarter	1	2	3	4	Total
Patriots	0	6	21	14	41
Dolphins	7	0	7	0	14

at Sun Life Stadium, Miami Gardens, Florida

- Date: October 4
- Game time: 8:30 p.m. EDT
- Game weather: 80 °F (27 °C) (Clear)
- Game attendance: 69,090
- Referee: Walt Coleman
- TV announcers (ESPN): Mike Tirico, Ron Jaworski, Jon Gruden, Suzy Kolber and Michele Tafoya.
- http://www.nfl.com/gamecenter/2010100400/2010/REG4/patriots@dolphins

Game information

First quarter

- MIA – Davone Bess 19-yard pass from Chad Henne (Dan Carpenter kick), Dolphins 7–0, Drive: 7 plays, 64 yards, 4:02.

Second quarter

- NE – Stephen Gostkowski 23-yard field goal, Dolphins 7–3, Drive: 16 plays, 55 yards, 9:11.
- NE – Stephen Gostkowski 30-yard field goal, Dolphins 7–6, Drive: 13 plays, 63 yards, 2:47.

Third quarter

- NE – Brandon Tate 103-yard kickoff return (Stephen Gostkowski kick), Patriots 13–7, Drive: 0 plays, 0 yards, 0:14.
- NE – BenJarvus Green-Ellis 12-yard run (Stephen Gostkowski kick), Patriots 20–7, Drive: 2 plays, 15 yards, 0:42.
- MIA – Ricky Williams 28-yard pass from Chad Henne (Dan Carpenter kick), Patriots 20–14, Drive: 8 plays, 80 yards, 3:48.
- NE – Danny Woodhead 11-yard pass from Tom Brady (Stephen Gostkowski kick), Patriots 27–14, Drive: 12 plays, 78 yards, 4:54.

Fourth quarter

- NE – Kyle Arrington 35-yard return of blocked field goal (Stephen Gostkowski kick), Patriots 34–14,
- NE – Pat Chung 51-yard interception return (Stephen Gostkowski kick), Patriots 41–14

Top passers

- NE – Tom Brady – 19/24, 153 yards, 1 touchdown
- MIA – Chad Henne – 28/38, 305 yards, 2 touchdowns, 3 interceptions

Top rushers

- NE – BenJarvus Green-Ellis – 16 rushes, 76 yards, 1 touchdown
- MIA – Ricky Williams – 8 rushes, 56 yards

Top receivers

- NE – Wes Welker – 8 receptions, 70 yards
- MIA – Davone Bess – 8 receptions, 96 yards, 1 touchdown

Top tacklers

- NE – Jerod Mayo – 14 tackles, 2 assists
- MIA – Yeremiah Bell – 6 tackles, 1 assist

Hoping to rebound from their divisional loss to the Jets, the Dolphins stayed at home for a Week 4 AFC East duel with the New England Patriots on Monday night. Miami delivered the opening punch in the first quarter as quarterback Chad Henne hooked up with wide receiver Davone Bess on a 19-yard touchdown pass. In the second quarter, the Patriots answered with kicker Stephen Gostkowski making a 23-yard and a 30-yard field goal.

New England took the lead in the third quarter as wide receiver Brandon Tate returned the second half's opening kickoff 103 yards for a touchdown, followed by running back BenJarvis Green-Ellis' 12-yard touchdown run. The Dolphins responded with Henne completing a 28-yard touchdown pass to running back Ricky Williams, but the Patriots came right back with quarterback Tom Brady's 11-yard touchdown pass to wide receiver Danny Woodhead. New England would continue its dominance on special teams in the fourth quarter as cornerback Kyle Arrington returned a blocked field goal 35 yards for a touchdown. Afterwards, the Patriots sealed the win as safety Patrick Chung returned an interception 51 yards for a touchdown.

With the loss, Miami went into its bye week at 2–2.

=== Week 6: at Green Bay Packers ===
Week 6: Miami Dolphins at Green Bay Packers – Game summary

Quarter	1	2	3	4	OT	Total
Dolphins	7	3	3	7	3	23
Packers	10	0	0	10	0	20

at Lambeau Field, Green Bay, Wisconsin

- Date: October 17
- Game time: 1:00 p.m. EDT/12:00 p.m. CDT
- Game weather: 57 °F (14 °C) (Sunny)
- Game attendance: 70,815
- Referee: Ed Hochuli
- TV announcers (CBS): Ian Eagle and Dan Fouts
- http://www.nfl.com/gamecenter/2010101700/2010/REG6/dolphins@packers

Game information

First quarter

- GB – Mason Crosby 46-yard field goal, Packers 3–0, Drive: 7 plays, 46 yards, 3:02.
- MIA – Davone Bess 2-yard pass from Chad Henne (Dan Carpenter kick), Dolphins 7–3, Drive: 11 plays, 74 yards, 5:06.
- GB – Greg Jennings 86-yard pass from Aaron Rodgers (Mason Crosby kick), Packers 10–7, Drive: 1 plays, 86 yards, 0:14.

Second quarter

- MIA – Dan Carpenter 53-yard field goal, Tied 10–10, Drive: 14 plays, 53 yards, 3:29.

Third quarter

- MIA – Dan Carpenter 41-yard field goal, Dolphins 13–10, Drive: 12 plays, 59 yards, 7:18.

Fourth quarter

- GB – Mason Crosby 26-yard field goal, Packers 17–13, Drive: 16 plays, 55 yards, 9:11.
- MIA – Anthony Fasano 22-yard pass from Chad Henne (Dan Carpenter kick), Dolphins 20–17, Drive: 7 plays, 51 yards, 2:48.
- GB – Aaron Rodgers 1-yard run (Mason Crosby kick), Tied 20–20, Drive: 12 plays, 59 yards, 5:07.

Overtime

- MIA – Dan Carpenter 44-yard field goal, Dolphins 23–20, Drive: 7 plays, 26 yards, 3:45.

Top passers

- MIA – Chad Henne – 23/39, 231 yards, 2 touchdowns, 1 interception
- GB – Aaron Rodgers – 18/33, 313 yards, 1 touchdown, 1 interception

Top rushers

- MIA – Ronnie Brown – 19 rushes, 73 yards
- GB – Brandon Jackson – 12 rushes, 53 yards

Top receivers

- MIA – Brandon Marshall – 10 receptions, 127 yards
- GB – Greg Jennings – 6 receptions, 133 yards, 1 touchdown

Top tacklers

- MIA – Karlos Dansby, Vontae Davis, Tony McDaniel – 4 tackles
- GB – Charlie Peprah – 9 tackles, 2 assists

Coming off their bye week the Dolphins flew to Lambeau field for an Interconference duel against the Packers. In the first quarter the Dolphins trailed early with kicker Mason Crosby nailing a 46-yard field goal. But they replied with QB Chad Henne making a 2-yard TD pass to WR Davone Bess. The lead didn't last very long after QB Aaron Rodgers made an 86-yard TD pass to WR Greg Jennings. The Dolphins tied the game in the second quarter with kicker Dan Carpenter hitting a 53-yard field goal. He also made a 41-yard field goal to put the Dolphins up 13–10. In the fourth quarter the Packers tied the game with Crosby making a 46-yard field goal, but the Dolphins got the lead back when Henne found TE Anthony Fasano on a 22-yard TD pass. Green Bay replied with Rodgers scrambling 1 yard to the endzone for a touchdown to put the game in overtime. After overtime, the decision was made when Carpenter successfully put away a 44-yard field goal to give the Dolphins the win.

With the win, the Dolphins improved to 3–2.

=== Week 7: vs. Pittsburgh Steelers ===
Week 7: Pittsburgh Steelers at Miami Dolphins – Game summary

Quarter	1	2	3	4	Total
Steelers	0	17	3	3	23
Dolphins	6	10	3	3	22

at Sun Life Stadium, Miami Gardens, Florida

- Date: October 24
- Game time: 1:00 p.m. EDT
- Game weather: 80 °F (27 °C) (Cloudy)
- Game attendance: 69,867
- Referee: Gene Steratore
- TV announcers (CBS): Greg Gumbel and Dan Dierdorf
- http://www.nfl.com/gamecenter/2010102401/2010/REG7/steelers@dolphins

Game information

First quarter

- MIA – Dan Carpenter 39-yard field goal, Dolphins 3–0, Drive: 4 plays, 1 yards, 0:51.
- MIA – Dan Carpenter 23-yard field goal, Dolphins 6–0, Drive: 4 plays, 8 yards, 1:53.

Second quarter

- PIT – Jeff Reed 22-yard field goal, Dolphins 6–3, Drive: 13 plays, 86 yards, 8:20.
- PIT – Hines Ward 21-yard pass from Ben Roethlisberger (Jeff Reed kick), Steelers 10–6, Drive: 5 plays, 34 yards, 1:44.
- MIA – Dan Carpenter 22-yard field goal, Steelers 10–9, Drive: 11 plays, 69 yards, 5:08.
- PIT – Mike Wallace 53-yard pass from Ben Roethlisberger (Jeff Reed kick), Steelers 17–9, Drive: 1 plays, 53 yards, 0:16.
- MIA – Davone Bess 26-yard pass from Chad Henne (Dan Carpenter kick), Steelers 17–16, Drive: 9 plays, 80 yards, 3:57.

Third quarter

- PIT – Jeff Reed 39-yard field goal, Steelers 20–16, Drive: 10 plays, 46 yards, 5:32.
- MIA – Dan Carpenter 37-yard field goal, Steelers 20–19, Drive: 9 plays, 52 yards, 4:24.

Fourth quarter

- MIA – Dan Carpenter 40-yard field goal, Dolphins 22–20, Drive: 7 plays, 52 yards, 3:27.
- PIT – Jeff Reed 18-yard field goal, Steelers 23–22, Drive: 8 plays, 47 yards, 2:51.

Top passers

- PIT – Ben Roethlisberger – 19/27, 302 yards, 2 touchdowns
- MIA – Chad Henne – 23/36, 257 yards, 1 touchdown, 1 interception

Top rushers

- PIT – Rashard Mendenhall – 15 rushes, 37 yards
- MIA – Ricky Williams – 11 rushes, 48 yards

Top receivers

- PIT – Hines Ward – 7 receptions, 131 yards, 1 touchdown
- MIA – Davone Bess – 6 receptions, 66 yards, 1 touchdown

Top tacklers

- PIT – Bryant McFadden – 5 tackles, 1 assist
- MIA – Chris Clemons – 6 tackles, 3 assists, 0.5 sack, 2 forced fumbles

Coming off their road win over the Packers, the Dolphins went home for a Week 7 intraconference duel with the Pittsburgh Steelers. The Dolphins delivered the opening splash in the first quarter with a 39-yard and a 23-yard field goal from kicker Dan Carpenter. In the second quarter, the Steelers took the lead with kicker Jeff Reed getting a 22-yard field goal, followed by quarterback Ben Roethlisberger completing a 21-yard touchdown pass to wide receiver Hines Ward. Miami would respond with Carpenter's 22-yard field goal, but Pittsburgh struck back with Roethlisberger's 53-yard touchdown pass to wide receiver Mike Wallace. The Dolphins would close out the half as quarterback Chad Henne found wide receiver Davone Bess on a 25-yard touchdown pass.

The Steelers added onto their lead in the third quarter as Reed got a 39-yard field goal. Miami would answer with Carpenter's 37-yard field goal. The Dolphins regained the lead in the fourth quarter as Carpenter booted a 40-yard field goal, but Pittsburgh answered with Reed making an 18-yard field goal. The Dolphins tried to rally, but the Steelers' defense held on for the win.

With the loss, Miami fell to 3–3.

=== Week 8: at Cincinnati Bengals ===
Week 8: Miami Dolphins at Cincinnati Bengals – Game summary

Quarter	1	2	3	4	Total
Dolphins	3	9	3	7	22
Bengals	7	7	0	0	14

at Paul Brown Stadium, Cincinnati, Ohio

- Date: October 31
- Game time: 1:00 p.m. EDT
- Game weather: 54 °F (12 °C) (Sunny)
- Game attendance: 63,179
- Referee: Terry McAulay
- TV announcers (CBS): Kevin Harlan and Solomon Wilcots
- http://www.nfl.com/gamecenter/2010103102/2010/REG8/dolphins@bengals

Game information

First quarter

- CIN – Terrell Owens 7-yard pass from Carson Palmer (Mike Nugent kick), Bengals 7–0, Drive: 15 plays, 86 yards, 7:40.
- MIA – Dan Carpenter 38-yard field goal, Bengals 7–3, Drive: 11 plays, 50 yards, 5:04.

Second quarter

- MIA – Dan Carpenter 42-yard field goal, Bengals 7–6, Drive: 10 plays, 55 yards, 5:17.
- CIN – Terrell Owens 37-yard pass from Carson Palmer (Mike Nugent kick), Bengals 14–6, Drive: 1 plays, 37 yards, 0:07.
- MIA – Dan Carpenter 24-yard field goal, Bengals 14–9, Drive: 7 plays, 39 yards, 1:51.
- MIA – Dan Carpenter 54-yard field goal, Bengals 14–12, Drive: 4 plays, 13 yards, 0:21.

Third quarter

- MIA – Dan Carpenter 31-yard field goal, Dolphins 15–14, Drive: 15 plays, 81 yards, 7:29.

Fourth quarter

- MIA – Ricky Williams 1-yard run (Dan Carpenter kick), Dolphins 22–14, Drive: 6 plays, 96 yards, 2:49.

Top passers

- MIA – Chad Henne – 24/37, 217 yards, 1 interception
- CIN – Carson Palmer – 17/38, 156 yards, 2 touchdowns, 1 interception

Top rushers

- MIA – Ronnie Brown – 16 rushes, 61 yards
- CIN – Cedric Benson – 20 rushes, 69 yards

Top receivers

- MIA – Brandon Marshall – 5 receptions, 64 yards
- CIN – Terrell Owens – 5 receptions, 65 yards, 2 touchdowns

Top tacklers

- MIA – Yeremiah Bell – 6 tackles, 3 assists
- CIN – Morgan Trent – 9 tackles, 2 assists, 1 interception

Hoping to rebound from their loss to the Steelers the Dolphins flew to Paul Brown Stadium for an AFC duel with the Bengals. In the first quarter the Dolphins trailed early as QB Carson Palmer got a 7-yard TD pass to WR Terrell Owens. They soon replied with kicker Dan Carpenter hitting a 38- and a 42-yard field goal. The Dolphins fell further behind with Palmer finding Owens again on a 37-yard TD pass. The Dolphins caught up and eventually took the lead with Carpenter hitting a 24, 54, and a 31-yard field goal in the third quarter to put the Dolphins up 15–14. They increased their lead with RB Ricky Williams making a 1-yard TD run.

With the win, the Dolphins improved to 4–3.

=== Week 9: at Baltimore Ravens ===
Week 9: Miami Dolphins at Baltimore Ravens – Game summary

Quarter	1	2	3	4	Total
Dolphins	7	3	0	0	10
Ravens	7	6	7	6	26

at M&T Bank Stadium, Baltimore, Maryland

- Date: November 7
- Game time: 1:00 p.m. EST
- Game weather: 50 °F (10 °C) (Partly Cloudy)
- Game attendance: 71,305
- Referee: John Parry
- TV announcers (CBS): Greg Gumbel and Dan Dierdorf
- http://www.nfl.com/gamecenter/2010110701/2010/REG9/dolphins@ravens

Game information

First quarter

- BAL – Willis McGahee 32-yard pass from Joe Flacco (Billy Cundiff kick), Ravens 7–0, Drive: 7 plays, 76 yards, 2:52.
- MIA – Ronnie Brown 12-yard run (Dan Carpenter kick), Tied 7–7, Drive: 11 plays, 75 yards, 6:45.

Second quarter

- BAL – Billy Cundiff 26-yard field goal, Ravens 10–7, Drive: 12 plays, 56 yards, 6:10.
- BAL – Billy Cundiff 39-yard field goal, Ravens 13–7, Drive: 10 plays, 39 yards, 6:13.
- MIA – Dan Carpenter 19-yard field goal, Ravens 13–10, Drive: 11 plays, 79 yards, 2:40.

Third quarter

- BAL – Derrick Mason 12-yard pass from Joe Flacco (Billy Cundiff kick), Ravens 20–10, Drive: 6 plays, 96 yards, 2:49.

Fourth quarter

- BAL – Billy Cundiff 20-yard field goal, Ravens 23–10, Drive: 13 plays, 61 yards, 5:58.
- BAL – Billy Cundiff 24-yard field goal, Ravens 26–10, Drive: 7 plays, 12 yards, 4:16

Top passers

- MIA – Chad Henne – 22/34, 213 yards, 3 interceptions
- BAL – Joe Flacco – 20/27, 266 yards, 2 touchdowns

Top rushers

- MIA – Ronnie Brown – 9 rushes, 59 yards, 1 touchdown
- BAL – Ray Rice – 22 rushes, 83 yards

Top receivers

- MIA – Brian Hartline – 4 receptions, 85 yards
- BAL – Ray Rice – 7 receptions, 97 yards

Top tacklers

- MIA – Karlos Dansby – 10 tackles
- BAL – Ray Lewis – 7 tackles, 1 assist

The Dolphins' eighth game was an AFC duel with the Ravens. The Dolphins trailed early after QB Joe Flacco completed a 32-yard TD pass to RB Willis McGahee. They replied with RB Ronnie Brown getting a 12-yard TD run. The Ravens got the lead back after kicker Billy Cundiff made a 26 and a 39-yard field goal. The Dolphins narrowed the lead with kicker Dan Carpenter nailing a 19-yard field goal. The Dolphins fell further behind after Flacco found WR Derrick Mason on a 12-yard TD pass. This was followed in the 4th quarter by Cundiff hitting a 20 and a 24-yard field goal.

With the loss, Miami fell to 4–4.

=== Week 10: vs. Tennessee Titans ===
Week 10: Tennessee Titans at Miami Dolphins – Game summary

Quarter	1	2	3	4	Total
Titans	10	0	7	0	17
Dolphins	7	3	10	9	29

at Sun Life Stadium, Miami Gardens, Florida

- Date: November 14
- Game time: 1:00 p.m. EST
- Game weather: 79 °F (26 °C) (Fair)
- Game attendance: 65,585
- Referee: Pete Morelli
- TV announcers (CBS): Ian Eagle and Dan Fouts
- http://www.nfl.com/gamecenter/2010111400/2010/REG10/titans@dolphins

Game information

First quarter

- MIA – Ronnie Brown 2-yard run (Dan Carpenter kick), Dolphins 7–0, Drive: 6 plays, 31 yards, 2:44
- TEN – Chris Johnson 17-yard run (Rob Bironas kick), Tied 7–7, Drive: 6 plays, 80 yards, 2:51
- TEN – Rob Bironas 40-yard field goal, Titans 10–7, Drive: 4 plays, 6 yards, 1:26

Second quarter

- MIA – Dan Carpenter 23-yard field goal, Tied 10–10, Drive: 8 plays, 75 yards, 3:49

Third quarter

- MIA – Dan Carpenter 26-yard field goal, Dolphins 13–10, Drive: 11 plays, 75 yards, 6:53
- MIA – Patrick Cobbs 13-yard pass from Chad Henne (Dan Carpenter kick), Dolphins 20–10, Drive: 2 plays, 13 yards, 0:14
- TEN – Nate Washington 14-yard pass from Vince Young (Rob Bironas kick), Dolphins 20–17, Drive: 11 plays, 74 yards, 5:46

Fourth quarter

- MIA – Dan Carpenter 42-yard field goal, Dolphins 23–17, Drive: 8 plays, 41 yards, 2:43
- MIA – Anthony Fasano 9-yard pass from Tyler Thigpen (run failed), Dolphins 29–17, Drive: 9 plays, 85 yards, 4:27

Top passers

- TEN – Vince Young – 9/18, 92 rushes, 1 touchdown, 1 interception
- MIA – Chad Henne – 19/28, 240 yards, 1 touchdown, 1 interception

Top rushers

- TEN – Chris Johnson – 17 rushes, 117 yards, 1 touchdown
- MIA – Ricky Williams – 11 rushes, 64 yards

Top receivers

- TEN – Bo Scaife – 7 receptions, 51 yards
- MIA – Anthony Fasano – 5 receptions, 107 yards, 1 touchdown

Top tacklers

- TEN – Alterraun Verner – 7 tackles
- MIA – Yeremiah Bell – 8 tackles, 1 sack, 1 forced fumble

Hoping to rebound from their loss to the Ravens the Dolphins played on home ground for an AFC duel with the Titans. In the first quarter the Dolphins took the lead as RB Ronnie Brown got a 2-yard TD run. The Titans replied with RB Chris Johnson getting a 17-yard TD run. They fell behind after kicker Rob Bironas nailed a 40-yard field goal. They eventually took the lead after kicker Dan Carpenter made a 23 and a 26-yard field goal, which was soon followed by QB Chad Henne completing a 13-yard TD pass to RB Patrick Cobbs. The Titans replied with QB Vince Young completing a 14-yard TD pass to WR Nate Washington, but the Dolphins continued to score after Carpenter got a 42-yard field goal, followed by QB Tyler Thigpen making a 9-yard TD pass to TE Anthony Fasano (With a failed 2-point conversion). Then FS Reshad Jones intercepted a pass in the end zone for a touchback.

With the win, the Dolphins improved to 5–4.

=== Week 11: vs. Chicago Bears ===
Week 11: Chicago Bears at Miami Dolphins – Game summary

Quarter	1	2	3	4	Total
Bears	3	3	10	0	16
Dolphins	0	0	0	0	0

at Sun Life Stadium, Miami Gardens, Florida

- Date: November 18
- Game time: 8:20 p.m. EST
- Game weather: 75 °F (24 °C) (Clear)
- Game attendance: 68,752
- Referee: Bill Leavy
- TV announcers (NFLN): Bob Papa, Matt Millen and Joe Theismann
- http://www.nfl.com/gamecenter/2010111800/2010/REG11/bears@dolphins

Game information

First quarter

- CHI – Robbie Gould 47-yard field goal, Bears 3–0, Drive: 8 plays, 32 yards, 4:27

Second quarter

- CHI – Robbie Gould 24-yard field goal, Bears 6–0, Drive: 13 plays, 40 yards, 6:50

Third quarter

- CHI – Robbie Gould 50-yard field goal, Bears 9–0, Drive: 7 plays, 38 yards, 3:13
- CHI – Matt Forte 2-yard run, Bears 16–0, Drive: 13 plays, 60 yards, 7:26

Fourth quarter

Top passers

- CHI – Jay Cutler – 16/25, 156 yards, 1 interception
- MIA – Tyler Thigpen – 17/29, 187 yards, 1 interception

Top rushers

- CHI – Matt Forte – 25 rushes, 97 yards, 1 touchdown
- MIA – Tyler Thigpen – 6 rushes, 27 yards

Top receivers

- CHI – Johnny Knox – 5 receptions, 55 yards
- MIA – Brian Hartline – 5 receptions, 70 yards

Top tacklers

- CHI – Lance Briggs – 7 tackles
- MIA – Karlos Dansby – 10 tackles, 1 sack

Coming off their win over the Titans, the Dolphins stayed at home for a Week 11 interconference duel with the Chicago Bears on Thursday night. Miami trailed early in the first quarter as Bears kicker Robbie Gould got a 46-yard field goal. Chicago added onto their lead in the second quarter with Gould making a 24-yard field goal.

The Bears continued to increase their lead with Gould's 50-yard field goal, followed by a touchdown scored by running back Matt Forté. This was the final score of the game, with Chicago's defense preventing any score by the Dolphins.

With the loss, the Dolphins fell to 5–5.

=== Week 12: at Oakland Raiders ===
Week 12: Miami Dolphins at Oakland Raiders – Game summary

Quarter	1	2	3	4	Total
Dolphins	10	3	10	10	33
Raiders	7	7	0	3	17

at Oakland–Alameda County Coliseum, Oakland, California

- Date: November 28
- Game time: 4:05 p.m. EST/1:05 p.m. PST
- Game weather: 54 °F (12 °C) (Sunny)
- Game attendance: 48,946
- Referee: Walt Anderson
- TV announcers (CBS): Gus Johnson and Steve Tasker
- http://www.nfl.com/gamecenter/2010112809/2010/REG12/dolphins@raiders

Game information

First quarter

- OAK – Jacoby Ford 101-yard kickoff return (Sebastian Janikowski kick), Raiders 7–0, Drive: 0 plays, 0 yards, 0:13
- MIA – Dan Carpenter 49-yard field goal, Raiders 7–3, Drive: 5 plays, 29 yards, 2:07
- MIA – Patrick Cobbs 29-yard pass from Chad Henne (Dan Carpenter kick), Dolphins 10–7, Drive: 8 plays, 65 yards, 4:40

Second quarter

- OAK – Jacoby Ford 44-yard pass from Bruce Gradkowski (Sebastian Janikowski kick), Raiders 14–10, Drive: 4 plays, 58 yards, 1:17
- MIA – Dan Carpenter 23-yard field goal, Raiders 14–13, Drive: 15 plays, 75 yards, 5:28

Third quarter

- MIA – Marlon Moore 57-yard pass from Chad Henne (Dan Carpenter kick), Dolphins 20–14, Drive: 5 plays, 72 yards, 2:08
- MIA – Dan Carpenter 44-yard field goal, Dolphins 23–14, Drive: 5 plays, 18 yards, 2:48

Fourth quarter

- OAK – Sebastian Janikowski 30-yard field goal, Dolphins 23–17, Drive: 6 plays, 68 yards, 2:11
- MIA – Dan Carpenter 25-yard field goal, Dolphins 26–17, Drive: 13 plays, 73 yards, 6:54
- MIA – Ricky Williams 45-yard run (Dan Carpenter kick), Dolphins 33–17, Drive: 2 plays, 46 yards, 0:16

Top passers

- MIA – Chad Henne – 17/30, 307 yards, 2 touchdowns, 1 interception
- OAK – Bruce Gradkowski – 17/32, 252 yards, 1 touchdown, 2 interceptions

Top rushers

- MIA – Ricky Williams – 20 rushes, 95 yards, 1 touchdown
- OAK – Jacoby Ford – 1 rush, 13 yards

Top receivers

- MIA – Davone Bess – 6 receptions, 111 yards
- OAK – Jacoby Ford – 4 receptions, 108 yards, 1 touchdown

Top tacklers

- MIA – Vontae Davis – 5 tackles
- OAK – Tyvon Branch – 9 tackles, 2 assists, 1 sack

The Dolphins' eleventh game was an AFC duel with the Raiders. In the first quarter the Dolphins trailed immediately as Jacoby Ford returned a kick-off 101 yards to their own endzone for a touchdown. They overcame this deficit with kicker Dan Carpenter nailing a 49-yard field goal, followed by QB Chad Henne completing a 29-yard TD pass to RB Patrick Cobbs. The Raiders replied as QB Bruce Gradkowski made a 44-yard TD pass to Ford. The Dolphins got the lead back as Carpenter got a 23-yard field goal, followed by Henne getting a 57-yard TD pass to WR Marlon Moore, and with Carpenter nailing a 44-yard field goal. The lead was narrowed when kicker Sebastian Janikowski hit a 30-yard field goal, but the Dolphins pulled away with Carpenter getting a 25-yard field goal, and with RB Ricky Williams getting a 45-yard TD run.

With the win, Miami improved to 6–5.

=== Week 13: vs. Cleveland Browns ===
Week 13: Cleveland Browns at Miami Dolphins – Game summary

Quarter	1	2	3	4	Total
Browns	0	3	7	3	13
Dolphins	0	3	0	7	10

at Sun Life Stadium, Miami Gardens, Florida

- Date: December 5
- Game time: 1:00 p.m. EST
- Game weather: 76 °F (24 °C) (Clear)
- Game attendance: 65,942
- Referee: Alberto Riveron
- TV announcers (CBS): Greg Gumbel and Dan Dierdorf
- http://www.nfl.com/gamecenter/2010120501/2010/REG13/browns@dolphins

Game information

First quarter

Second quarter

- CLE – Phil Dawson 32-yard field goal, Browns 3–0, Drive: 7 plays, 14 yards, 1:41
- MIA – Dan Carpenter 60-yard field goal, Tied 3–3, Drive: 8 plays, 24 yards, 1:41

Third quarter

- CLE – Benjamin Watson 3-yard pass from Jake Delhomme (Phil Dawson kick), Browns 10–3, Drive: 6 plays, 94 yards, 3:40

Fourth quarter

- MIA – Anthony Fasano 11-yard pass from Chad Henne (Dan Carpenter kick), Tied 10–10, Drive: 11 plays, 80 yards, 5:49
- CLE – Phil Dawson 23-yard field goal, Browns 13–10, Drive: 4 plays, −4 yards, 0:54

Top passers

- CLE – Jake Delhomme – 24/34, 217 yards, 1 touchdown
- MIA – Chad Henne – 16/32, 174 yards, 1 touchdown, 3 interceptions

Top rushers

- CLE – Peyton Hillis – 18 rushes, 57 yards
- MIA – Ronnie Brown – 16 rushes, 50 yards

Top receivers

- CLE – Benjamin Watson – 10 receptions, 100 yards, 1 touchdown
- MIA – Davone Bess – 6 receptions, 67 yards

Top tacklers

- CLE – Abram Elam – 5 tackles, 2 assists, 1 interception
- MIA – Tim Dobbins – 5 tackles, 2 assists

Coming off their win over the Raiders the Dolphins played on home ground for an AFC duel with the Browns. The second quarter saw the Dolphins trailing early as kicker Phil Dawson made a 32-yard field goal. They replied with kicker Dan Carpenter hitting a 60-yard field goal. They trailed again with QB Jake Delhomme completing a 3-yard TD pass to TE Benjamin Watson. But they replied in the fourth quarter with QB Chad Henne making an 11-yard TD pass to TE Anthony Fasano. The Browns scored again after Dawson nailed a 23-yard field goal.

With the loss, Miami fell to 6–6.

=== Week 14: at New York Jets ===
Week 14: Miami Dolphins at New York Jets – Game summary

Quarter	1	2	3	4	Total
Dolphins	10	0	0	0	10
Jets	0	3	0	3	6

at New Meadowlands Stadium, East Rutherford, New Jersey

- Date: December 12
- Game time: 4:15 p.m. EST
- Game weather: 53 °F (12 °C) (Rain)
- Game attendance: 78,948
- Referee: Ron Winter
- TV announcers (CBS): Ian Eagle and Dan Fouts
- http://www.nfl.com/gamecenter/2010121210/2010/REG14/dolphins@jets

Game information

First quarter

- MIA – Dan Carpenter 47-yard field goal, Dolphins 3–0, Drive: 6 plays, 13 yards, 2:38
- MIA – Brandon Marshall 6-yard pass from Chad Henne, Dolphins 10–0, Drive: 6 plays, 26 yards, 2:55

Second quarter

- NYJ – Nick Folk 35-yard field goal, Dolphins 10–3, Drive: 7 plays, 21 yards, 2:49

Third quarter

Fourth quarter

- NYJ – Nick Folk 42-yard field goal, Dolphins 10–6, Drive: 12 plays, 69 yards, 5:14

Top passers

- MIA – Chad Henne – 5/18, 55 yards, 1 touchdown
- NYJ – Mark Sanchez – 17/44, 216 yards, 1 interception

Top rushers

- MIA – Ronnie Brown – 16 rushes, 55 yards
- NYJ – LaDainian Tomlinson – 19 rushes, 49 yards

Top receivers

- MIA – Anthony Fasano – 2 receptions, 33 yards
- NYJ – Jerricho Cotchery – 5 receptions, 69 yards

Top tacklers

- MIA – Karlos Dansby – 8 tackles, 1 assist, 1 sack, 1 forced fumble
- NYJ – Sione Pouha – 7 tackles, 3 assists, 1 sack

Hoping to rebound from their loss to the Browns the Dolphins flew to New Meadowlands Stadium for an AFC East rivalry match against the Jets. The Dolphins took the lead with kicker Dan Carpenter nailing a 47-yard field goal, followed by QB Chad Henne completing a 6-yard TD pass to WR Brandon Marshall. The Jets responded with kicker Nick Folk hitting a 35 and a 42-yard field goal.

With the win, Miami improved to 7–6.

=== Week 15: vs. Buffalo Bills ===
Week 15: Buffalo Bills at Miami Dolphins – Game summary

Quarter	1	2	3	4	Total
Bills	0	10	7	0	17
Dolphins	0	7	0	7	14

at Sun Life Stadium, Miami Gardens, Florida

- Date: December 19
- Game time: 1:00 p.m. EST
- Game weather: 67 °F (19 °C) (Cloudy)
- Game attendance: 65,511
- Referee: Jeff Triplette
- TV announcers (CBS): Bill Macatee and Rich Gannon
- Recap

Game information

First quarter

Second quarter

- BUF – David Nelson 18-yard pass from Ryan Fitzpatrick (Rian Lindell kick), Bills 7–0, Drive: 9 plays, 35 yards, 4:26.
- BUF – Rian Lindell 29-yard field goal, Bills 10–0, Drive: 5 plays, 32 yards, 1:59.
- MIA – Ronnie Brown 6-yard run (Dan Carpenter kick), Bills 10–7, Drive: 8 plays, 64 yards, 3:57.

Third quarter

- BUF – Stevie Johnson 15-yard pass from Ryan Fitzpatrick (Rian Lindell kick), Bills 17–7, Drive: 11 plays, 86 yards, 6:25.

Fourth quarter

- MIA – Brandon Marshall 9-yard pass from Chad Henne (Dan Carpenter kick), Bills 17–14, Drive: 11 plays, 77 yards, 6:59.

Top passers

- BUF – Ryan Fitzpatrick – 16/26, 223 yards, 2 touchdowns, 1 interception
- MIA – Chad Henne – 33/45, 276 yards, 1 touchdown, 1 interception

Top rushers

- BUF – Fred Jackson – 15 rushes, 36 yards
- MIA – Ronnie Brown – 10 rushes, 39 yards, 1 touchdown

Top receivers

- BUF – Stevie Johnson – 6 receptions, 69 yards, 1 touchdown
- MIA – Brandon Marshall – 11 receptions, 106 yards, 1 touchdown

Top tacklers

- BUF – Drayton Florence – 7 tackles
- MIA – Yeremiah Bell – 9 tackles

The Dolphins' fourteenth game was a must-win matchup against the Buffalo Bills. The Dolphins lost. The final score was seventeen (17) to fourteen (14) and the Dolphins never lead during the game. The second quarter saw Miami trailing early with QB Ryan Fitzpatrick completing an 18-yard TD pass to WR David Nelson. This was followed by kicker Rian Lindell nailing a 29-yard field goal. The Dolphins responded with RB Ronnie Brown getting a 6-yard TD run, but trailed further in the third quarter with Fitzpatrick throwing a 15-yard TD pass to WR Stevie Johnson. The Dolphins tried to cut the lead with QB Chad Henne getting a 9-yard TD pass to WR Brandon Marshall, but the Bills defense denied any more offensive chances.

With the loss, Miami fell to 7–7, and was officially eliminated from playoff contention. Reaction around the Miami area was palpable, with many fans and the media calling for head coach Tony Sparano to resign at the end of the season.

=== Week 16: vs. Detroit Lions ===
Week 16: Detroit Lions at Miami Dolphins – Game summary

Quarter	1	2	3	4	Total
Lions	3	7	7	17	34
Dolphins	3	14	7	3	27

at Sun Life Stadium, Miami Gardens, Florida

- Date: December 26
- Game time: 1:00 p.m. EST
- Game weather: 65 °F (18 °C), Sunny & Windy
- Game attendance: 66,731
- Referee: Tony Corrente
- TV announcers (Fox): Dick Stockton, Charles Davis & Laura Okmin
- Recap
  Gamebook

Game information

First quarter

- DET – Dave Rayner 39-yard field goal, Lions 3–0, Drive: 4 plays, −2 yards, 2:04.
- MIA – Dan Carpenter 40-yard field goal, Tied 3–3, Drive: 7 plays, 30 yards, 2:57.

Second quarter

- DET – Brandon Pettigrew 20-yard pass from Shaun Hill (Dave Rayner kick), 10–3 Lions, Drive: 6 plays, 80 yards, 3:13.
- MIA – Lousaka Polite 4-yard run (Dan Carpenter kick), Tied 10–10, Drive: 11 plays, 80 yds, 6:04.
- MIA – Davone Bess 13-yard pass from Chad Henne (Dan Carpenter kick), Dolphins 17–10, Drive: 4 plays, 40 yards, 1:12.

Third quarter

- DET – Maurice Morris 5-yard run (Dave Rayner kick), Tied 17–17, Drive: 14 plays, 86 yards, 6:28.
- MIA – Ronnie Brown 1-yard run (Dan Carpenter kick), Dolphins 24–17, Drive: 9 plays, 69 yards, 5:44.

Fourth quarter

- MIA – Dan Carpenter 28-yard field goal, 27–17 Dolphins, Drive: 9 plays, 52 yards, 4:53.
- DET – Jahvid Best 53-yard pass from Shaun Hill (Dave Rayner kick), 27–24 Dolphins, Drive: 1 plays, 53 yards, 0:00.
- DET – Dave Rayner 47-yard field goal, Tied 27–27, Drive: 4 plays, 7 yards, 0:57.
- DET – DeAndre Levy 30-yard interception return (Dave Rayner kick), 34–27 Lions, Drive: 3 plays, 2 yards, 0:33.

Top passers

- DET – Shaun Hill – 14/26, 222 yards, 2 touchdowns
- MIA – Chad Henne – 29/44, 278 yards, 1 touchdown, 2 interceptions

Top rushers

- DET – Jahvid Best – 6 rushes, 24 yards,
- MIA – Ricky Williams – 14 rushes, 71 yards,

Top receivers

- DET – Brandon Pettigrew – 4 receptions, 74 yards, 1 touchdown
- MIA – Brandon Marshall – 10 receptions, 102 yards

Top tacklers

- DET – Bobby Carpenter – 8 tackles, 1 assist
- MIA – Yeremiah Bell – 5 tackles, 1 assist

The Dolphins fifteenth game was an inter-conference duel against the Lions. The Dolphins trailed early as kicker Dave Rayner nailed a 39-yard field goal. They re-tied the game with kicker Dan Carpenter hit a 40-yard field goal. The Lions scored again with QB Shaun Hill completing a 20-yard TD pass to TE Brandon Pettigrew, but the Dolphins got the lead back with FB Lousaka Polite getting a 4-yard TD run, followed by QB Chad Henne getting a 13-yard TD pass to WR Davone Bess. The Lions tied the game with RB Maurice Morris getting a 5-yard TD run, but the Dolphins scored to take the lead again with RB Ronnie Brown getting a 1-yard TD run, followed by Carpenter hitting a 28-yard field goal. They failed to maintain this lead after QB Shaun Hill completed a 53-yard TD pass to RB Jahvid Best, followed by Rayner making a 47-yard field goal, then with MLB DeAndre Levy returning an interception 30 yards for a touchdown.

With the loss, Miami fell to 7–8.

=== Week 17: at New England Patriots ===
Week 17: Miami Dolphins at New England Patriots – Game summary

Quarter	1	2	3	4	Total
Dolphins	0	0	0	7	7
Patriots	14	10	14	0	38

at Gillette Stadium, Foxborough, Massachusetts

- Date: January 2
- Game time: 1:00 p.m. EST
- Game weather: 47 °F (8 °C) (Cloudy and occasional rain)
- Game attendance: 68,756
- Referee: Terry McAulay
- TV announcers (CBS): Bill Macatee and Rich Gannon

Game information

First quarter

Second quarter

Third quarter

Fourth quarter

Top passers

- MIA –
- NE –

Top rushers

- MIA –
- NE –

Top receivers

- MIA –
- NE –

Top tacklers

- MIA –
- NE –

The Dolphins' final game was an AFC East rematch against the Patriots. They trailed early with QB Tom Brady throwing a 13-yard TD pass to WR Rob Gronkowski, followed by BenJarvus Green-Ellis getting a 1-yard TD run, then with kicker Shayne Graham nailing a 28-yard field goal. The Dolphins continued to struggle after a three-and-out was converted into a 94-yard punt return for a touchdown by Julian Edelman, followed by Brady making a 10-yard TD pass to TE Alge Crumpler, then with QB Brian Hoyer completing a 42-yard TD pass to WR Brandon Tate. The Dolphins made their only score of the game with QB Tyler Thigpen throwing a 21-yard TD pass to WR Davone Bess.

With the loss, Miami finished their season with a 7–9 record.
