= Ikaika =

Ikaika may refer to:

- A captive orca
- Ikaika Alama-Francis (born 1984), football player
- Ikaika Kahoano (born 1978), singer
- Ikaika Malloe (born 1974), American football player and coach
