= Reshad Jones =

American football player (born 1988)

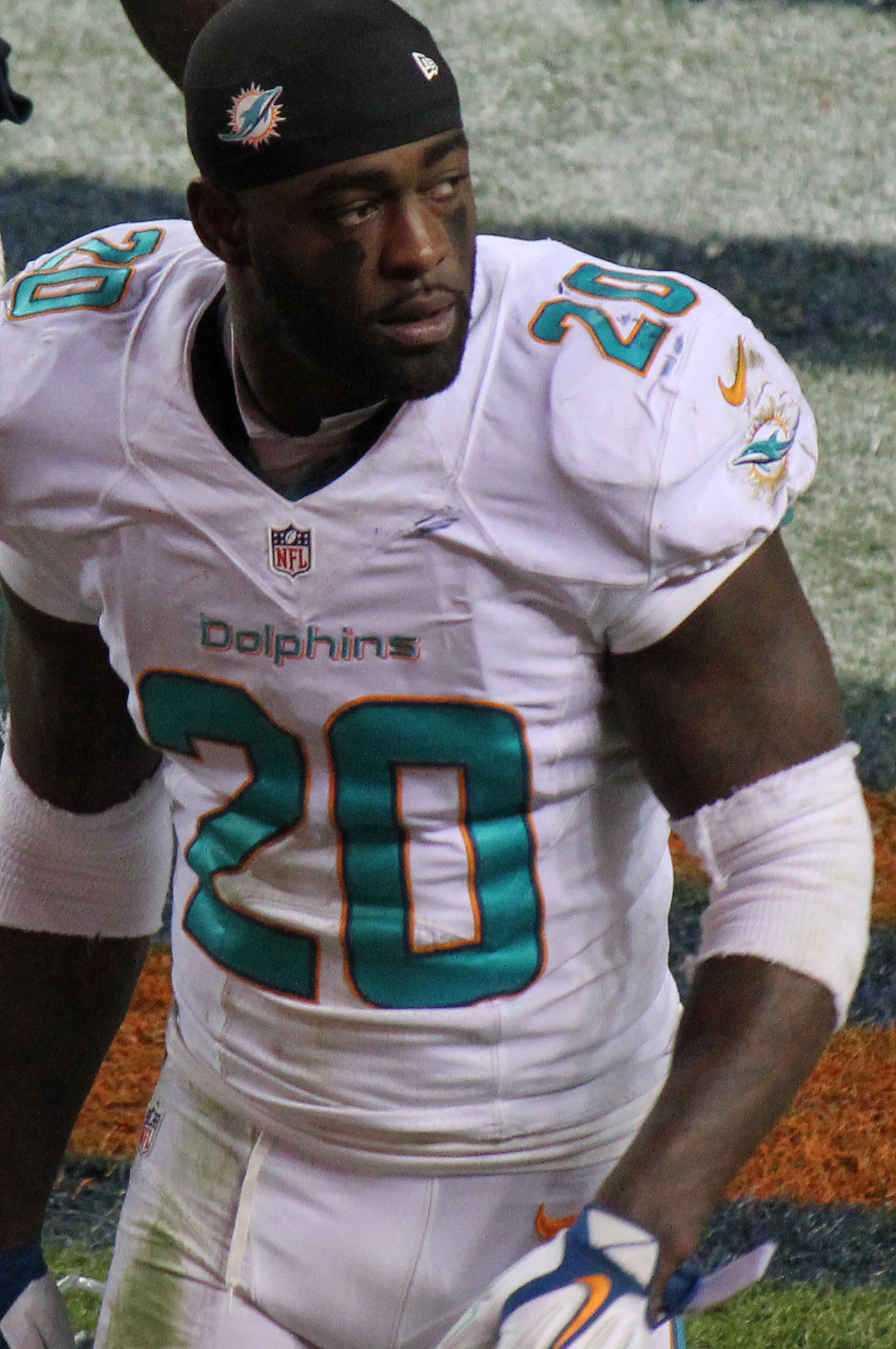
- Jones with the Miami Dolphins in 2014

No. 20
- Position: Safety

Personal information
- Born: February 25, 1988 (age 38); Atlanta, Georgia, U.S.
- Listed height: 6 ft 1 in (1.85 m)
- Listed weight: 215 lb (98 kg)

Career information
- High school: Booker T. Washington (Atlanta, Georgia)
- College: Georgia (2006–2009)
- NFL draft: 2010: 5th round, 163rd overall pick

Career history
- Miami Dolphins (2010–2019)

Awards and highlights
- 2× Pro Bowl (2015, 2017); Second-team All-American (2008); 2× Second-team All-SEC (2008, 2009)

Career NFL statistics
- Total tackles: 776
- Sacks: 10.5
- Forced fumbles: 3
- Fumble recoveries: 7
- Interceptions: 21
- Defensive touchdowns: 6
- Stats at Pro Football Reference

Reshad Monquez Jones (born February 25, 1988) is an American former professional football player who was a safety in the National Football League (NFL). He played college football for the Georgia Bulldogs. He was selected by the Miami Dolphins in the fifth round of the 2010 NFL draft.

== Early life ==
Reshad was born in Atlanta, Georgia. He graduated from Booker T. Washington High School where he earned AAAA All-State and Defensive Player of the Year honors from The Atlanta Journal-Constitution and the Georgia Sports Writers Association as a senior. Jones was the no. 1 safety in the country according to PrepStar 100 and Rivals Top 100. Jones was also the Fox Sports Net South Countdown to Signing Day All-South First Team defensive back.

== College career ==
Jones was a three-year letterman and two-year starter at Georgia. Reshad finished his college career playing in 39 games with 27 starts and recording career totals of 206 tackles (129 solos), including 10 stops for losses. Jones batted away 13 passes and intercepted 11 others for 174 yards. The stand out safety became the eighth player since statistics were kept in 1950 to lead the team in interceptions in consecutive seasons. As a sophomore, Reshad was named second-team Sophomore All-American and second-team All-SEC honors while winning the team's Most Improved Defensive Back Award. Jones repeated the feature as a junior and was named as a second-team All-SEC selection and earned the team's Most Improved Player Award for defense.

== Professional career ==
On January 4, 2010, Jones announced that he would forgo his senior season at Georgia and enter the 2010 NFL draft, as he was projected to be a second round pick by NFL draft experts. He was one of 54 collegiate defensive backs to attend the NFL Scouting Combine in Indianapolis, Indiana and completed all of the combine drills. He finished tied for third among all defensive backs in the bench press, tied for fifth in the vertical jump, and finished 21st in the 40-yard dash. On March 16, 2010, he attended Georgia's pro day and improved his times in the 40-yard dash (4.50s) and 20-yard dash (2.64s) and ran positional drills for scouts and team representatives. He was linked to the Miami Dolphins after attending a dinner with team personnel during a two-day visit. At the conclusion of the pre-draft process, Jones was projected to be a third or fourth round pick by NFL draft experts and scouts. He was ranked the third best strong safety prospect in the draft by NFLDraftScout.com.

External videos
- Reshad Jones' NFL Combine workout

Pre-draft measurables
Height	Weight	Arm length	Hand span	40-yard dash	10-yard split	20-yard split	20-yard shuttle	Three-cone drill	Vertical jump	Broad jump	Bench press
6 ft 1 1/4 in (1.86 m)	214 lb (97 kg)	32 in (0.81 m)	9 in (0.23 m)	4.51 s	1.56 s	2.58 s	4.54 s	7.43 s	39 1/2 in (1.00 m)	9 ft 10 in (3.00 m)	24 reps
All values from NFL Combine

=== 2010 ===
The Miami Dolphins selected Jones in the fifth round (163rd overall) of the 2010 NFL draft. The Miami Dolphins traded their sixth (174th overall) and seventh round (219th overall) selections to the Washington Redskins to acquire the Redskins' fifth round pick and select Jones. He was the 13th safety selected in 2010.

On July 14, 2010, the Dolphins signed Jones to a four-year, $1.95 million contract that includes a signing bonus of $160,400.

He entered training camp competing against Tyrone Culver and Chris Clemons for job as the starting free safety after it was left vacant by the departure of Gibril Wilson. Head coach Tony Sparano named Jones the backup free safety behind Chris Clemons to start the regular season.

He made his professional regular season debut in the Miami Dolphins' season-opening 15–10 victory at the Buffalo Bills. He was inactive for two consecutive games (Weeks 8–9) after suffering a knee injury during the Dolphins' 23–22 loss to the Pittsburgh Steelers. On November 14, 2010, Jones recorded three solo tackles, two pass deflections, his first career sack, and made his first career interception off a pass by quarterback Vince Young during a 29–17 victory against the Tennessee Titans. The following week, he earned his first career start at free safety in place of Chris Clemons who suffered a hamstring injury the previous week. He recorded a season-high five combined tackles in the Dolphins' 16–0 loss to the Chicago Bears. He was sidelined for the Dolphins' Week 12 victory at the Oakland Raiders after he suffered an ankle injury. He finished his rookie season with 21 combined tackles (18 solo), two pass deflections, an interception, and a sack in 13 games and two starts.

=== 2011 ===
Through training camp in 2011, he competed for the job as the starting free safety against Chris Clemons. Defensive coordinator Mike Nolan named Jones the starting free safety, alongside strong safety Yeremiah Bell, to begin the regular season.

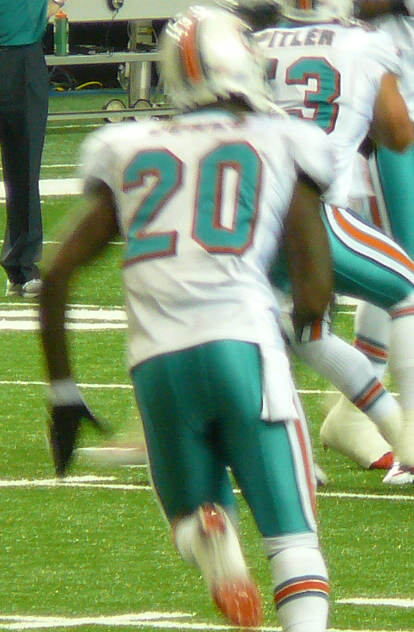
Jones with the Dolphins in 2011.

He started the Miami Dolphins' season-opener against the New England Patriots and collected a season-high 12 combined tackles (eight solo) and deflected a pass during their 38–24 loss. The following week, he recorded six combined tackles and sacked quarterback Matt Schaub as the Dolphins lost 23–13 to the Houston Texans. Jones was inactive for the Dolphins' Week 7 loss to the Denver Broncos due to a knee injury he sustained the previous week. He returned the following week, but was demoted as a backup behind Tyrone Culver. He remained the backup for three games before regaining his starting role in Week 11. On December 12, 2011, the Miami Dolphins fired head coach Tony Sparano after the Dolphins fell to a 4–9 record. The defensive backs coach Todd Bowles was named the interim head coach for the rest of the season. In Week 15, Jones made six combined tackles and intercepted his first pass of the season off a pass by Ryan Fitzpatrick in their 30–23 victory at the Buffalo Bills. He finished the 2011 season with 67 combined tackles (49 solo), four pass deflections, two sacks, and an interception in 15 games and 12 starts.

=== 2012 ===
Jones entered training camp slated as the starting strong safety. Head coach Joe Philbin named him the starter for the start of the regular season, alongside free safety Chris Clemons.

On November 15, 2012, Jones recorded a season-high 14 combined tackles (11 solo) and deflected a pass during a 19–14 loss at the Buffalo Bills. In Week 13, Jones recorded nine solo tackles, a pass deflection, a sack, and intercepted a pass by Tom Brady during a 23–16 loss to the New England Patriots. He finished the 2012 season with 94 combined tackles (73 solo), nine pass deflections, four interceptions, and a sack in 16 games and 16 starts. He was also the led the Dolphins in interceptions.

=== 2013 ===
Jones held out and skipped organized team activities due to a contract dispute after he was set to make $1.32 million in 2013 after allowing an average quarterback rating of 38.0 and only allowed one touchdown reception in pass coverage during his first full season as their starting free safety. His quarterback rating average allowed in pass coverage ranked fourth among all safeties in 2012. On August 5, 2013, the Miami Dolphins signed Jones to a four-year, $28.01 million contract that includes $15 million guaranteed and a $5 million signing bonus.

Jones and Chris Clemons remainder the starting safety duo to begin the season in their second season under defensive coordinator Kevin Coyle. On October 6, 2013, Jones recorded three solo tackles, broke up a pass, and returned an interception by Joe Flacco for a 25-yard touchdown during a 26–23 loss to the Baltimore Ravens. It marked his first career touchdown in his first four seasons. In Week 17, he recorded a season-high 11 combined tackles (ten solo) as the Dolphins lost 21–7 to the New York Jets. Jones finished the 2013 season with 107 combined tackles (84 solo), four pass deflections, 1.5 sacks, one interception, and a touchdown in 16 games and 16 starts.

=== 2014 ===
On August 8, 2014, Jones was suspended for the first four games of the 2014 season for violating the league's substance abuse policy. He released a statement through the NFLPA that he never intentionally took any performance-enhancing drugs and failed the test for a substance that is banned by the NFL after receiving a supplement from a former college trainer, but fully takes responsibility for not checking the supplement and investigating further.

Jimmy Wilson replaced Jones at strong safety during his four-game absence (Weeks 1–4). Upon finishing his suspension, he returned to his starting role, alongside free safety Louis Delmas. He made his season debut in a Week 6 matchup against the Green Bay Packers and recorded nine solo tackles and deflected a pass during a 27–24 loss. The following week, Jones recorded seven solo tackles, a season-high two pass deflections, and returned an interception by Jay Cutler for a career-long 50-yard return during a 27–14 victory at the Chicago Bears. In Week 13, he collected a season-high 12 combined tackles (nine solo), deflected a pass, and intercepted a pass by quarterback Geno Smith in the Dolphins' 16–13 win at the New York Jets. Jones finished the season with 80 combined tackles (70 solo), seven pass deflections, three interceptions, and a sack in 12 games and 12 starts.

=== 2015 ===
Head coach Joe Philbin retained Jones as the starting strong safety to start the 2015 regular season, opposite new free safety Walt Aikens.

He started the Miami Dolphins' season-opener at the Washington Redskins and recorded a season-high 12 combined tackles (seven solo) and broke up a pass during their 17–10 victory. On October 5, 2015, head coach of Joe Philbin was fired after the Dolphins lost their Week 4 matchup against the New York Jets and stood at 1–3. Tight ends coach Dan Campbell was promoted to interim head coach for the remainder of the season. On October 18, 2015, Jones collected eight combined tackles, deflected a pass, and returned an interception by Marcus Mariota for a 30-yard touchdown in the Dolphins' 38–10 win at the Tennessee Titans. The following week, he made eight solo tackles, two pass deflections, and returned an interception by quarterback Brian Hoyer for a 23-yard touchdown in a 44–26 win against the Houston Texans. In Week 10, Jones collected nine combined tackles, a pass deflection, a sack, and an interception as the defeated the Philadelphia Eagles 20–19 victory. He finished the season with a career-high 135 combined tackles (106 solo), ten pass deflections, a career-high five interceptions, two sacks, and two touchdowns in 16 games and 16 starts. On January 24, 2016, it was announced that Jones was named as a replacement to the 2016 Pro Bowl after Cincinnati Bengals' safety Reggie Nelson was unable to participate due to an ankle injury he suffered in the AFC Wildcard Game. On May 16, 2016, Jones was announced as the 64th ranked player, as voted by his peers, on the NFL Top 100 Players of 2016.

=== 2016 ===
On January 9, 2016, the Miami Dolphins announced the hiring of Chicago Bears' offensive coordinator Adam Gase as their new head coach. Defensive coordinator Vance Joseph named Jones the starting strong safety to begin the regular season, along with free safety Isa Abdul-Quddus.

He started the Miami Dolphins' season-opener at the Seattle Seahawks and recorded a season-high 12 combined tackles (six solo) and broke up a pass during their 12–10 loss. On October 16, 2016, Jones collected five combined tackles, a pass deflection, and intercepted a pass by Ben Roethlisberger in their 30–15 victory over the Pittsburgh Steelers. He left the game in the third quarter after tearing his rotator cuff. On October 19, 2016, the Miami Dolphins officially placed Jones on injured reserve and announced that he would miss the remainder of the season with his torn rotator cuff. Jones finished the 2016 season with 51 combined tackles (31 solo), four pass deflections, an interception, and half a sack in six games and six starts.

=== 2017 ===
On March 9, 2017, the Miami Dolphins signed Jones to a five-year, $60 million contract extension with the Dolphins with $35 million guaranteed and a $9.2 million signing bonus.

Head coach Adam Gase named Jones the starting strong safety, opposite free safety Nate Allen. In Week 9, he collected nine solo tackles and broke up a pass in the Dolphins' 27–24 loss to the Oakland Raiders. On December 19, 2017, Jones was named to his second Pro Bowl. On December 24, 2017, Jones recorded a season-high 15 combined tackles (ten solo) and deflected a pass during their 29–13 loss at the Kansas City Chiefs. He finished the season with 122 combined tackles (94 solo), five pass deflections, two interceptions, and 1.5 sacks. Pro Football Focus gave Jones an overall grade of 81.5, ranking 29th among all safeties in 2017. His 122 tackles were those most among all defensive backs and 12th most in the league.

=== 2018 ===
In the Dolphins' season opener against the Tennessee Titans, Jones recorded two interceptions in a single game for the first time in his professional career.

=== 2019 ===
On November 20, 2019, Jones was placed on injured reserve, ending his season.

On March 18, 2020, the Miami Dolphins released Jones, who still had two years left on his previous deal. Jones was the last remaining Dolphin on the roster to have played under head coach Tony Sparano, who died from arteriosclerotic heart disease 2 years prior. Jones' release from the Dolphins also made sixth-year wide receiver DeVante Parker the new longest tenured player on the team's roster.

== NFL career statistics ==
Year	Team	Games		Tackles				Interceptions				
Year	Team	GP	GS	Cmb	Solo	Ast	Sck	PD	Int	Yds	Lng	TD
2010	MIA	13	2	21	18	3	1.0	2	1	0	0	0
2011	MIA	15	12	67	49	18	2.0	4	1	1	1	0
2012	MIA	16	16	94	73	21	1.0	9	4	28	15	0
2013	MIA	16	16	107	84	23	1.5	4	1	25	25	1
2014	MIA	12	12	80	70	10	1.0	7	3	62	50	0
2015	MIA	16	16	135	106	29	2.0	10	5	104	42	2
2016	MIA	6	6	51	31	20	0.5	4	1	17	17	0
2017	MIA	16	16	122	94	28	1.5	5	2	15	15	2
2018	MIA	14	13	72	57	14	0.0	9	3	109	54	1
2019	MIA	4	4	27	17	10	0.0	1	0	0	0	0
Total		128	113	776	599	177	10.5	55	21	361	54	6

== Personal life ==
Jones is first cousins with former NFL cornerback/return specialist Adam 'Pacman' Jones. Jones has a daughter with WAGS Miami star, Darnell Nicole. They separated in 2016.

On July 3, 2025, NBC Sports reported that Jones had $2.58 million stolen from his bank account by a Merrill Lynch vice president and a 49-year-old woman. Jones had earned $58.1 million over the course of his football career. On October 9, 2025, ESPN reported that Jones had settled a lawsuit against Merrill Lynch for $9.5 million in August 2025.
