= Tyler Thigpen =

American football player (born 1984)

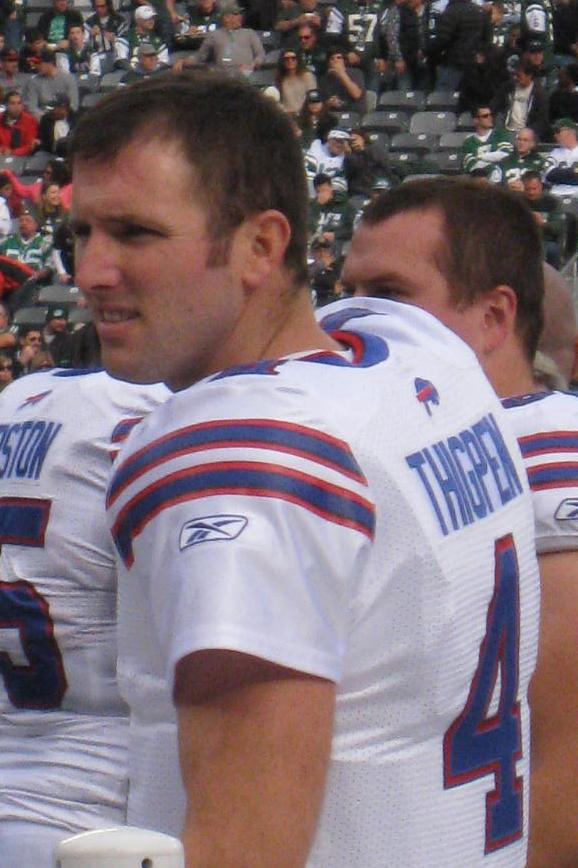
- Thigpen with the Buffalo Bills in 2011

No. 4, 16
- Position: Quarterback

Personal information
- Born: April 14, 1984 (age 42); Winnsboro, South Carolina, U.S.
- Listed height: 6 ft 1 in (1.85 m)
- Listed weight: 216 lb (98 kg)

Career information
- High school: Fairfield Central (Winnsboro)
- College: Coastal Carolina (2003–2006)
- NFL draft: 2007: 7th round, 217th overall pick

Career history
- Minnesota Vikings (2007)*; Kansas City Chiefs (2007–2009); Miami Dolphins (2009–2010); Buffalo Bills (2011–2012); Cleveland Browns (2014)
- * Offseason or practice squad member only

Awards and highlights
- Big South Player of the Year (2006)

Career NFL statistics
- Passing attempts: 509
- Passing completions: 275
- Completion percentage: 54.0%
- TD–INT: 21–18
- Passing yards: 3,222
- Passer rating: 72.5
- Stats at Pro Football Reference

Tyler Beckham Thigpen (born April 14, 1984) is an American former professional football player who was a quarterback in the National Football League (NFL). He played college football for the Coastal Carolina Chanticleers and was selected by the Minnesota Vikings in the seventh round of the 2007 NFL draft.

He was the first quarterback to play for Coastal Carolina. He led the Chanticleers program to a 30–8 record as their starting quarterback. Thigpen holds the single-season and career passing records in most major statistical categories at Coastal Carolina.

He saw his most extensive action as a starting quarterback for the Kansas City Chiefs in 2008. Thigpen recorded 22 touchdowns (18 passing, 3 rushing, and 1 receiving) against 12 interceptions in 11 starts, though the Chiefs were 1–10 in that span.

== Early life ==
Thigpen was born in Winnsboro, South Carolina, and he attended Fairfield Central High School, where he played on the football team. He became an All-South Carolina selection as a senior running back. In addition to running back, Thigpen played wide receiver and punter in high school.

He grew up playing football in the Newberry County Youth Sports.

== College career ==
In February 2002, Thigpen elected to go to Coastal Carolina University in Conway, South Carolina, and majored in sports management.

Thigpen was the first quarterback in Coastal Carolina history, and wore the jersey #16. The Coastal Carolina Chanticleers football program began in 2003. The team competed in the Big South Conference of the NCAA Football Championship Subdivision.

Thigpen and the rest of the Chanticleers' first recruiting class redshirted their freshman year in 2002. In 2003, he started nine of ten games for the team and was third on the team's roster in rushing. After the Chanticleers' inaugural season in which the team finished with a 6–5 record, Thigpen led the team to a 10–1 record in 2004. In 2004, Thigpen started the opening 8 games before suffering a season-ending shoulder injury against Gardner–Webb. In 2005, Thigpen started all 11 games for the Chanticleers and earned the Big South Conference Offensive Player of the Week Award after rushing for 111 yards and three touchdowns and throwing for 157 yards in a victory over the Virginia Military Institute.

In 2006, Thigpen became the first Chanticleer to be chosen a consensus All-American. He registered a career-high 119 rushing yards at Gardner–Webb, including a 76-yard bootleg. He was named Big South Conference Player of the Year in 2006, when he completed 217-of-339 passes for 3,296 yards and 29 touchdowns, and carried 113 times for 656 yards and five touchdowns. Thigpen had a 30–8 record in four seasons (41 games and 39 starts). From 2003 to 2006, the Chanticleers had a 34–11 record in Thigpen's four seasons with the team, winning three Big South Conference championships.

Thigpen played alongside wide receiver Jerome Simpson and running back Mike Tolbert, who both, like Thigpen, later played in the NFL, to help lead the young Chanticleers program to major victories against No. 1 James Madison in 2005, and No. 3 Furman in 2006. He led the Chanticleers to the NCAA Division I-AA playoffs and a Big South Conference championship. Thigpen holds the single-season and career passing records in every major statistical category at Coastal Carolina.

== Professional career ==
=== Pre-draft ===
Thigpen was not invited to the NFL Scouting Combine, but impressed NFL scouts at his pro day (held on March 8, 2007, on the campus of Coastal Carolina) and attended a workout at Clemson University to help raise his draft stock.

Pre-draft measurables
Height	Weight	40-yard dash	10-yard split	20-yard split	20-yard shuttle	Three-cone drill	Vertical jump	Broad jump
6 ft 1 7/8 in (1.88 m)	223 lb (101 kg)	4.78 s	1.65 s	2.78 s	4.40 s	7.11 s	29 in (0.74 m)	8 ft 9 in (2.67 m)
All values from Pro Day.

=== Minnesota Vikings ===
Thigpen was selected in the seventh round of the 2007 NFL draft with the 217th overall pick by the Minnesota Vikings, becoming the first player in Coastal Carolina and Big South Conference history to be drafted in the NFL.

In the 2007 preseason, the Vikings hosted the St. Louis Rams, losing the game by a score of 13–10. Kansas City Chiefs scout and vice president of player personnel Bill Kuharich attended the game at the Hubert H. Humphrey Metrodome. Thigpen played in the fourth quarter and in two possessions with the Vikings offense and completed 3-of-6 passes for 29 yards and picked up 18 yards on two scrambles. Kuharich filed a scouting report following the game and told the rest of the Chiefs personnel to keep an eye on Thigpen if he were to be released after the preseason.

On May 18, 2007, Thigpen became the first of eight Vikings drafted in 2007 to sign a contract, agreeing to a four-year deal. Thigpen then competed with Brooks Bollinger, Tarvaris Jackson, and Drew Henson for a quarterback roster spot for the 2007 NFL season. The Vikings released Thigpen on September 1, 2007, along with several other players. The Vikings planned on signing Thigpen to their practice squad after passing waivers.

=== Kansas City Chiefs ===
==== 2007 season ====
Several NFL teams had just two quarterbacks on their active roster heading into the season, including the Kansas City Chiefs, who had just recently released quarterbacks Casey Printers and Jeff Terrell. Concerning the roster move, Thigpen said, "I definitely felt this was coming...I wasn't surprised by it at all. It was still a great opportunity for me and the Vikings are still trying to keep me around." Thigpen was signed by the Chiefs the following day. Vikings head coach Brad Childress was reportedly upset when the Chiefs claimed Thigpen on waivers.

Thigpen was seen as showing a lot of potential following a strong preseason, whereas the Vikings were otherwise thin on talent at the quarterback position. Going into the 2007 NFL Draft, the Chiefs had Thigpen on their list of players that they had considering selecting in the later rounds, possibly with their seventh round selection (#231). As the draft played out, the Vikings chose Thigpen with the 217th choice.

With the Chiefs, Thigpen made his regular season debut replacing an injured Damon Huard versus the San Diego Chargers on December 12, 2007, in the game's final minutes. The Chiefs lost the game by a score of 24–10. Thigpen finished the game 2-of-6 for 41 yards and an interception. Later in the week at practice, he tore his medial collateral ligament (MCL) and was placed on injured reserve, ending his season.

==== 2008 season ====
Prior to the 2008 season, Thigpen impressed Chiefs coaches enough to make the team think he could challenge for, and even win, the team's starting job against the incumbent Brodie Croyle. Thigpen was listed as the third-string quarterback on the Chiefs' depth chart at the beginning of the 2008 NFL season and made his season debut on September 14 against the Oakland Raiders, when Damon Huard left with "mild head trauma." Thigpen connected on 14-of-33 passes for 151 yards. Thigpen made his first NFL start on September 21, 2008, against the Atlanta Falcons. Thigpen struggled in the game, finishing 14-of-36 and passing for 128 yards with three interceptions in the 14–38 loss. The Chiefs trailed the Falcons 24–0 until Thigpen threw a touchdown pass to Dwayne Bowe just before halftime. Thigpen's third interception was returned for a touchdown with just over a minute remaining in the game. In the week prior to the game, Chiefs coach Herman Edwards insisted he would substitute Damon Huard into the game if Thigpen struggled. Edwards contemplated it during the game, but decided against it reasoning that Thigpen "put some points on the board." Following the game, asked if Thigpen would keep the starting job, Edwards said, "We'll see."

The following week, Huard was retained as the Chiefs' starting quarterback. However, Thigpen was again awarded the starting position after Croyle and Huard were placed on injured reserve, ending both of their seasons.

I think you adjust to what your players do well... You start out with a system but the system has to be adjusted to the players you have. Tyler feels very comfortable in what he's doing and I think he has given us the best opportunity to move the ball, get first downs and score. We’re rolling that way and we’re not turning back.

— Herman Edwards on implementing the spread offense.

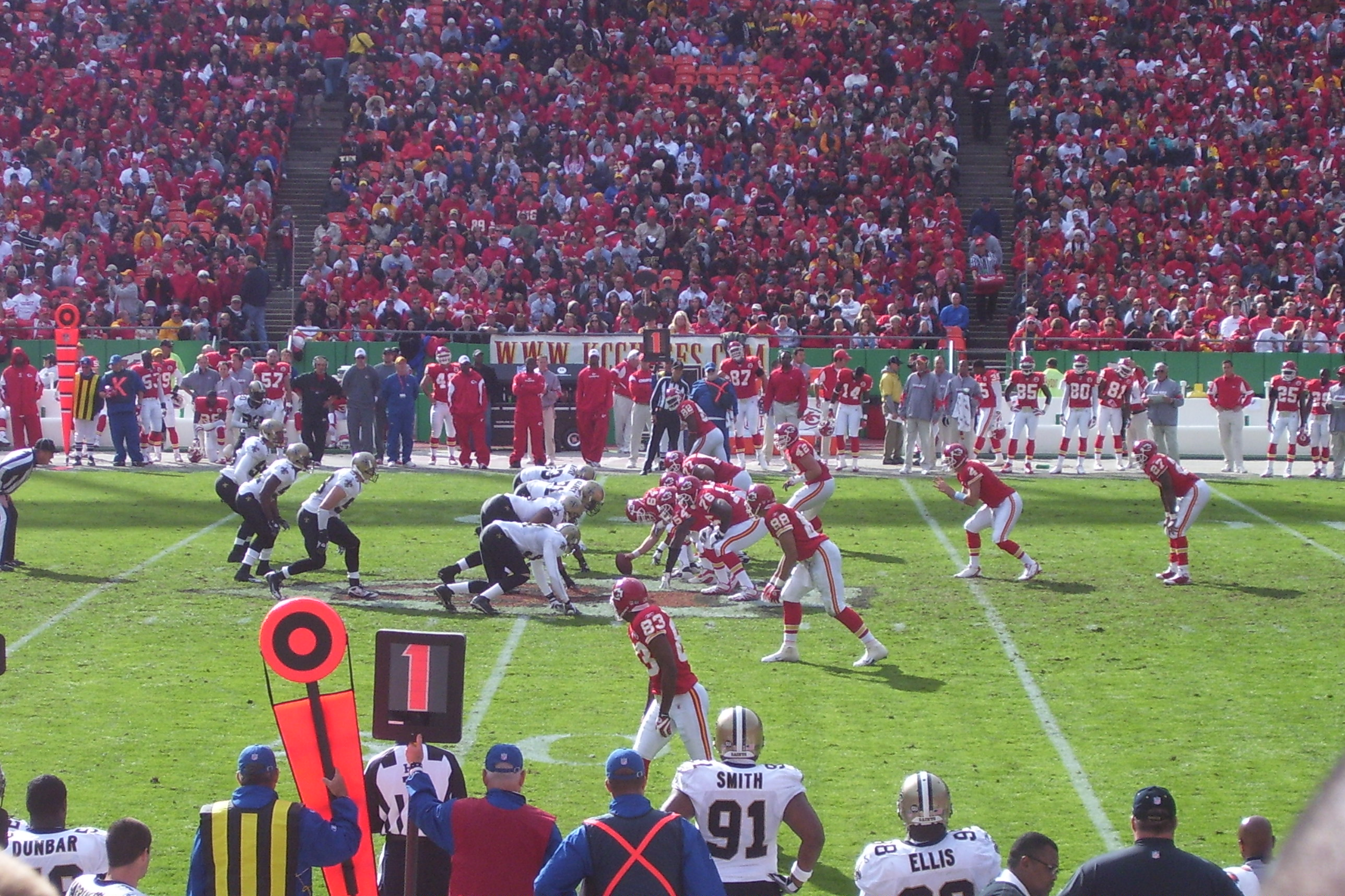
Thigpen (second from right) lines up with the Chiefs in a pistol offense formation.

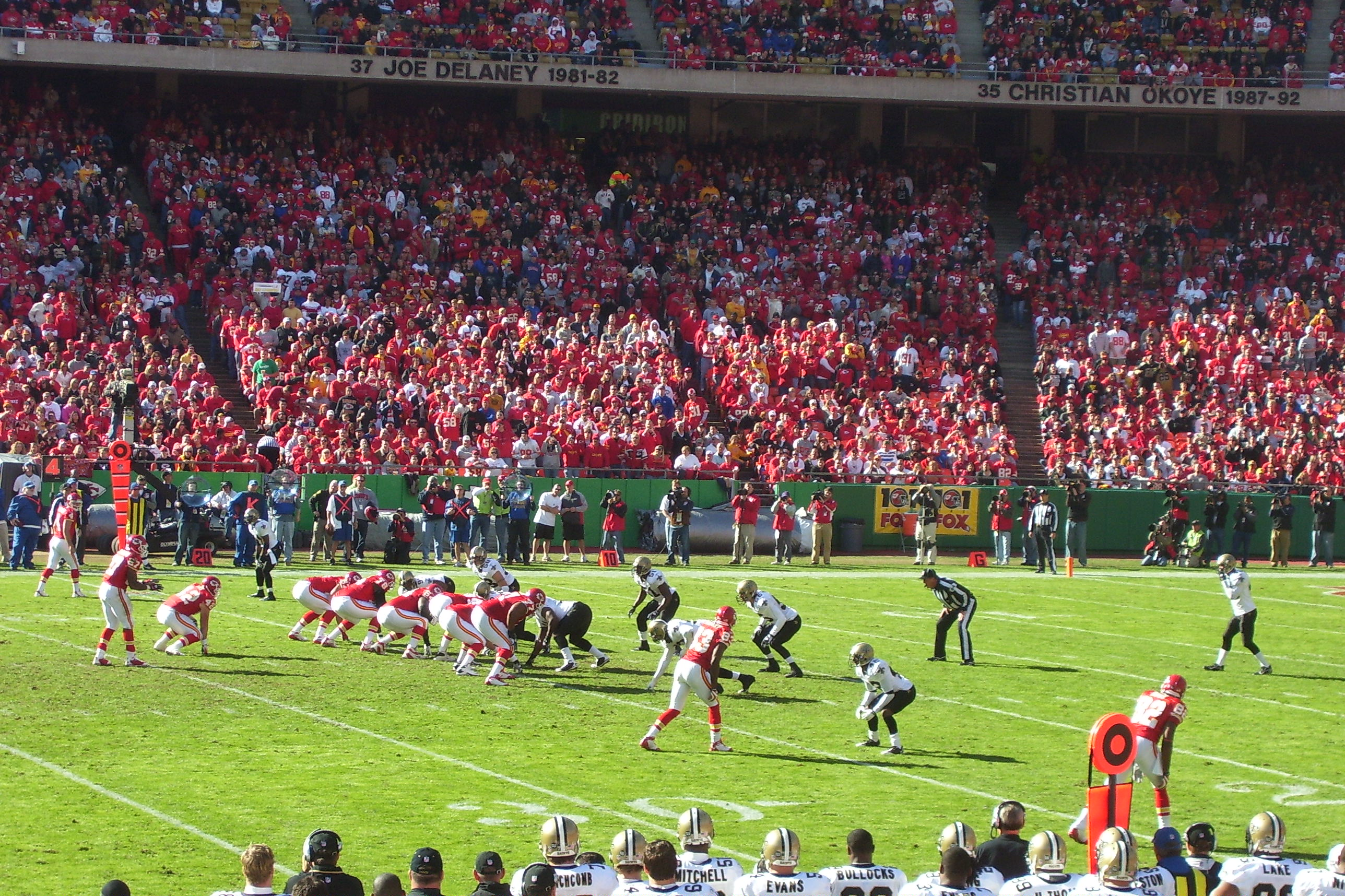
Thigpen (first from left) lines up as a wide receiver on offense as RB Larry Johnson lines up as the quarterback in a wildcat formation.

With the absence of running back Larry Johnson, the central part of the Chiefs' offense in years past, offensive coordinator Chan Gailey adjusted the offense to mimic the spread formation run by Thigpen at Coastal Carolina. Herman Edwards and Chan Gailey chose to implement the spread offense in order to prepare Thigpen for his second career start. By changing the gameplan, the Chiefs' offense began to find an identity after swapping their power running game for spread-type formations that best suited Thigpen.

By implementing the spread offense, the Chiefs made a huge gamble, as most in the NFL believe that a spread offense cannot work in professional football. Upon Larry Johnson's return, Chan Gailey and Edwards implemented the pistol offense to keep Thigpen in the spread while allowing Johnson to run downhill. However efficient the Chiefs became in running the spread offense, it became limited in the red zone, and the Chiefs struggled to finish out winning games.

In Thigpen's second career start, he passed for 280 yards with a 69.4% completion rate, with two touchdowns and no interceptions against the New York Jets, nearly leading the Chiefs to win over the heavily favored Jets.

Thigpen scored his first receiving touchdown the following week versus the Tampa Bay Buccaneers. The 37-yard pass was from wide receiver Mark Bradley in a Wildcat formation. Thigpen also passed for 164 yards, a touchdown, no interceptions, and a 56.0% completion rate in the 30–27 loss against Tampa Bay Buccaneers. Thigpen became only the fifth player in Chiefs' history (and the first quarterback) to throw a touchdown pass and also score touchdowns by running and receiving. In the game, the Chiefs led 24–3 with a little more than two minutes remaining in the second quarter and seemed headed for just their second victory of the season. The Buccaneers rallied back and won the game in overtime with 24 unanswered points.

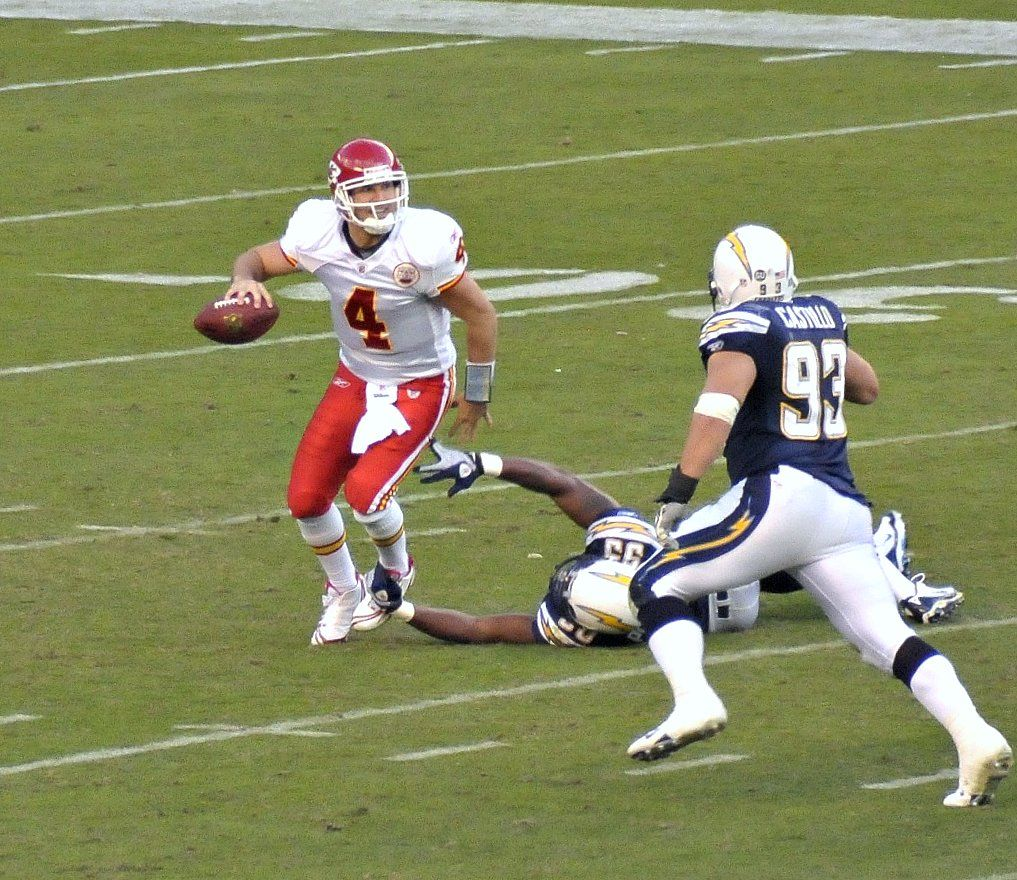
Thigpen avoids a sack from linebacker Shaun Phillips in a game against the San Diego Chargers

Thigpen continued his impressive play the following week in the Chiefs' 20–19 loss to the San Diego Chargers, completing 27-of-41 passes for 266 yards, three touchdowns and no interceptions. That gave him six touchdown passes and no turnovers in his previous three games.

After throwing three interceptions against the Atlanta Falcons and appearing lucky to avoid throwing twice that many, Thigpen threw 124 straight passes without an interception through Week 10. Thigpen's no-interception streak ended at 161 in the closing seconds of a 30–20 loss to the New Orleans Saints, but Thigpen still managed to complete 19-of-38 passes for 235 yards and two touchdowns to Dwayne Bowe. Thigpen became the first Chiefs quarterback to throw a touchdown pass in four consecutive games since Trent Green in 2005.

Prior to the Chiefs implementing the spread offense, Thigpen had been playing erratically with the Chiefs, and he suddenly became poised and effective running the new offense. His passer rating has climbed from 44.3 to 76.9 in the five games following his initial start at Atlanta. The Chiefs scored more than 10 points just twice in their first six games, but scored more offensive points than that in every game after, and twice had topped 25.

Thigpen had his first bad game in five outings against the Buffalo Bills on November 23 in the Chiefs' 54–31 loss. Thigpen's three turnovers (two interceptions and one lost fumble) led to 20 points by the Bills. Despite the turnovers, Thigpen also threw for 240 yards and three touchdowns.

Thigpen won his first game as the Chiefs' starter on November 30 against the Oakland Raiders, leading Kansas City to a 20–13 victory. Thigpen finished 15-of-22 for 162 yards and ran for 48 more. The victory ended a 7-game losing streak for the Chiefs. The following week, Thigpen kept the Chiefs competitive against the Denver Broncos, holding onto a 17–17 tie into the fourth quarter. After the Chiefs lost the lead to Denver, Thigpen drove the Chiefs all the way to the Broncos' 5-yard line, where his draw on fourth-and-goal was snuffed out by Broncos cornerback Dré Bly at the 1-yard line. The Broncos held their 24–17 lead and sent the Chiefs to a 2–11 record on the season.

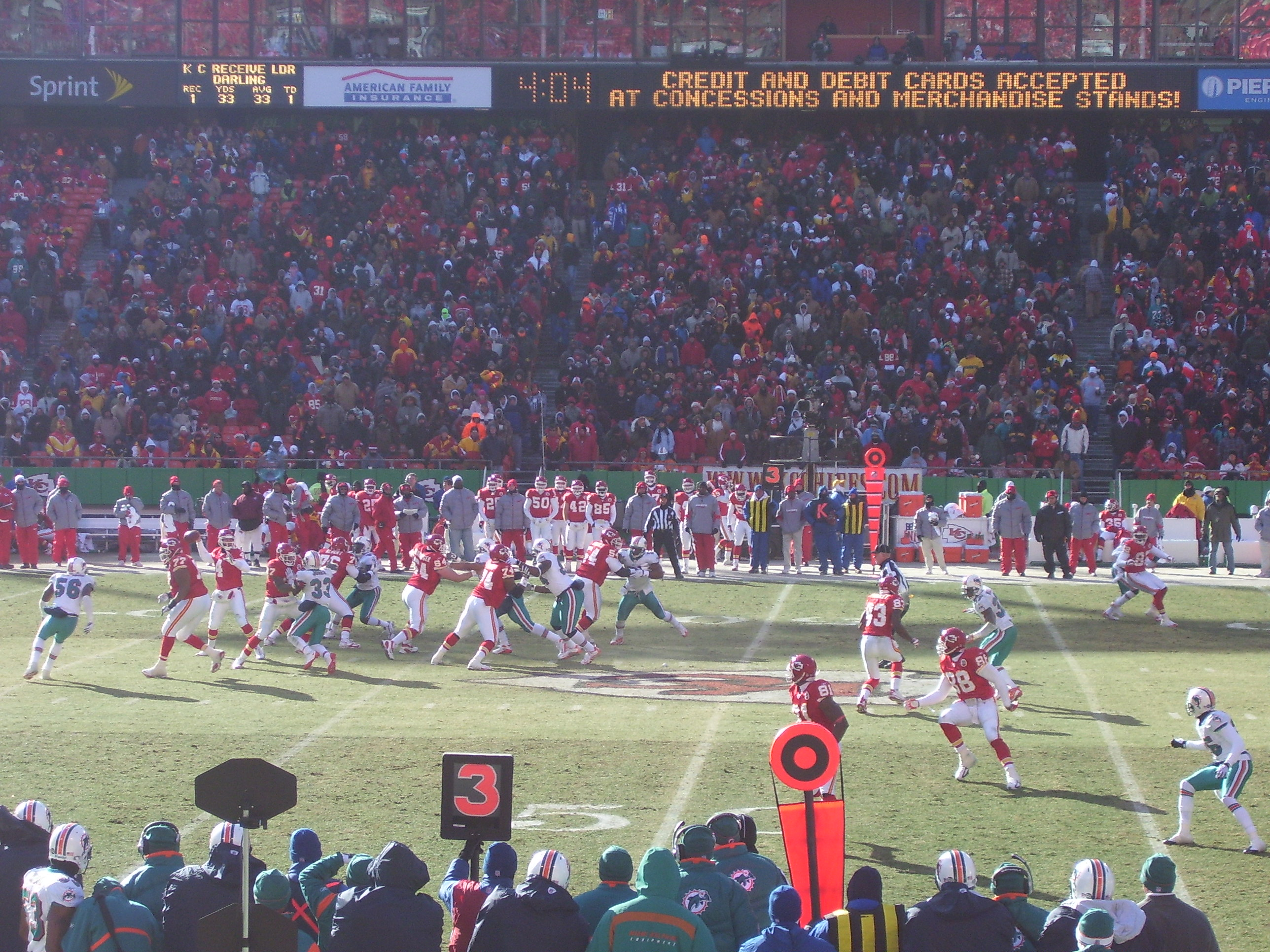
Under pressure, Thigpen attempts to pass against the Dolphins' defense.

The following week against the Chargers, Thigpen was 19-of-38 for 171 yards with two touchdowns. Thigpen's first touchdown in the game (to Dwayne Bowe) gave the Chiefs a 14–0 lead over the Chargers, and his second touchdown (rushed in from 3 yards out) gave Kansas City a 21–3 lead in the third quarter. The Chiefs had a 21–10 lead with 1:19 remaining the game, but allowed two touchdowns and lost the Chargers 22–21.

Kansas City hosted the Miami Dolphins in the second-coldest game ever held at Arrowhead Stadium on December 21 with the game-time temperature at 10 °F. Thigpen threw a career best 320 yards with two touchdowns, but also threw three interceptions. Despite trailing 10–0 early in the game, Thigpen led the Chiefs to a 28–24 lead by halftime. The Chiefs failed to score a touchdown in the second half of the game and lost 38–31.

In the Chiefs' final game of the 2008 season, the Chiefs lost to the Cincinnati Bengals by a score of 16–6. The Chiefs' offense managed to get only two first downs in the first half of the game. Thigpen finished the game 19-of-26 for 191 yards and one touchdown.

Thigpen's final statistics for the 2008 season included 21 total touchdowns, 12 interceptions, and 2,994 all-purpose yards. He led the NFL in rushing yards by a quarterback with 386. He lost 10 of the 11 games he started at quarterback, six of which were lost by margins of seven points or less.

==== 2009 season ====
Following a 2–14 season, Thigpen appeared to be the Chiefs' lone quarterback who would remain in their plans for the 2009 season, especially after Damon Huard was released. Though Thigpen had earned the right to compete for the starting job, the Chiefs were expected to add a high-end quarterback through free agency or the 2009 NFL draft. Despite impressing coaches in Brodie Croyle and Damon Huard's absence, Thigpen was not a lock for the starting job. Chiefs tight end Tony Gonzalez voiced his support for Thigpen to retain the position for the 2009 season. "It would be a disgrace if they don't (keep Thigpen as the starting quarterback)", Gonzalez told ESPN. "We've been playing well since he came in...I could see this being a playoff team next year. I could see us turning it around." Gonzalez was later traded to the Atlanta Falcons.

The Kansas City Star reported that Herman Edwards's coaching staff would meet after the 2008 season to debate Thigpen's prospects and whether to keep the spread offense the team adjusted to in a seemingly temporary move earlier this season. Edwards was fired as head coach but Chan Gailey, who implemented the spread offense, was retained as offensive coordinator under new head coach Todd Haley.

The Chiefs acquired quarterback Matt Cassel from the New England Patriots on February 28 for a second-round draft selection.

Head coach Todd Haley initially said that Thigpen would compete against Cassel for the starting quarterback position, but the first depth chart in training camp listed Thigpen as the third quarterback behind Brodie Croyle. Thigpen competed with Croyle for the backup quarterback position, and the Chiefs listened to trade offers in exchange for Thigpen throughout the offseason. The Jacksonville Jaguars offering a fifth-round draft pick but Kansas City ultimately declined.

Thigpen played in Week 1 against the Baltimore Ravens, having one rushing attempt for two yards. He was listed as inactive for weeks two and three.

=== Miami Dolphins ===
Thigpen was traded to the Miami Dolphins for an undisclosed draft pick on September 29, 2009. The move came just two days after Dolphins starting quarterback Chad Pennington suffered a season-ending shoulder injury. After spending the first 15 games with the Dolphins as the inactive third quarterback, Thigpen made his first appearance for the Dolphins in Week 17 against the Steelers after both Chad Henne and Pat White left the game with injuries. He scored a touchdown, but later ended up throwing an interception in the end zone during a pivotal point in the game. Thigpen was given another chance to drive the Dolphins down the field with only 40 seconds on the clock, but he overthrew the receiver which resulted in his second interception of the game.

In the Dolphins initial off-season depth chart, Thigpen was listed as the second quarterback, behind Chad Henne. He was listed ahead of former starter Chad Pennington and Pat White. After Chad Henne threw three interceptions in the Dolphins game against New England on October 4, 2010, Thigpen came in and completed 2-of-6 passes for 15 yards and an interception. He also scrambled once for 12 yards. In Week 9, Thigpen was passed over when Chad Pennington was named starter for the rest of the season. However, after both Pennington and Henne went down with injuries in a home game against the Tennessee Titans, Thigpen entered the game and threw for a touchdown pass in a Dolphins win against the Tennessee Titans. Thigpen started next game against the Chicago Bears, but was replaced by Henne the following week.

=== Buffalo Bills ===
On July 26, 2011, he agreed to terms with the Buffalo Bills on a three-year contract. Thigpen played two seasons with the team, seeing limited playing time as a backup in seven games.

=== Cleveland Browns ===
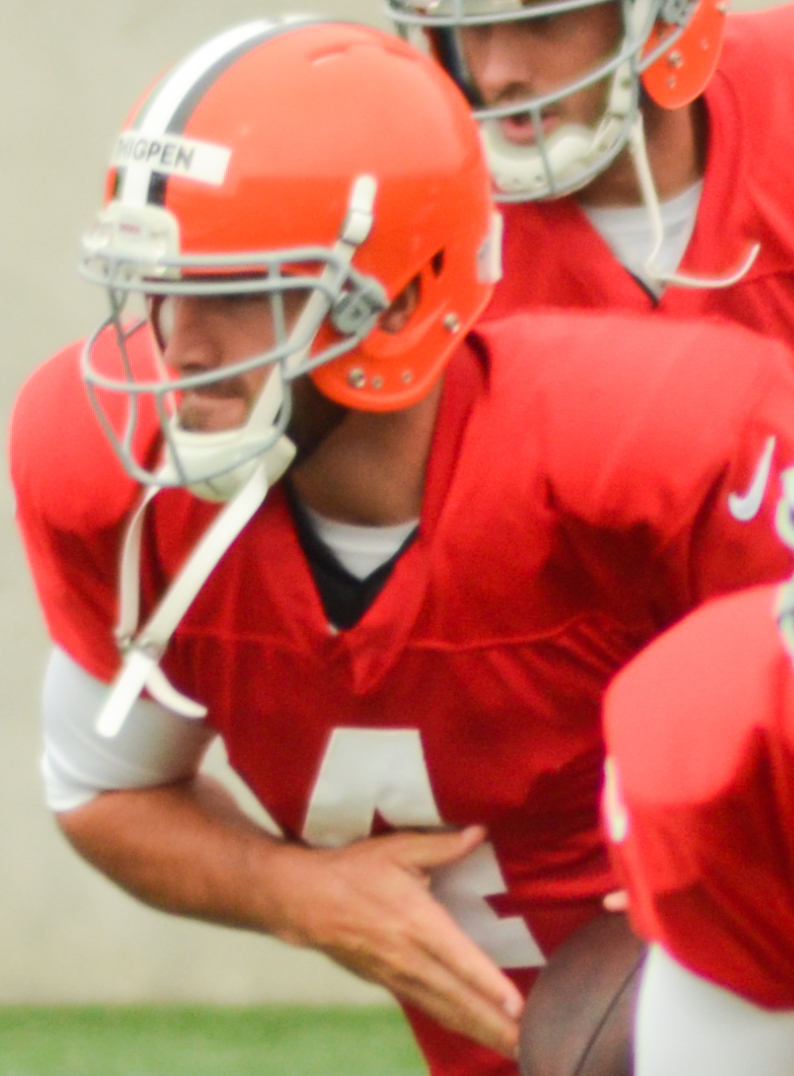
Thigpen with the Cleveland Browns in 2014

On May 1, 2014, the Cleveland Browns signed Thigpen to a one-year contract. He was released after the signing of Rex Grossman on August 12, 2014. He re-signed with the Browns on December 23, 2014, after injuries to Johnny Manziel and Brian Hoyer.

== Career statistics ==
=== NFL ===
Year	Team	Games			Passing								Rushing			
Year	Team	GP	GS	Record	Cmp	Att	Pct	Yds	Avg	TD	Int	Rtg	Att	Yds	Avg	TD
2007	KC	1	0	0−0	2	6	33.3	41	6.8	0	1	18.7	0	0	0.0	0
2008	KC	14	11	1−10	230	420	54.8	2,608	6.2	18	12	76.0	62	386	6.2	3
2009	KC	1	0	0−0	0	0	0.0	0	0.0	0	0	0.0	1	2	2.0	0
2009	MIA	1	0	0−0	4	8	50.0	83	10.4	1	2	87.0	1	1	1.0	0
2010	MIA	5	1	0−1	33	62	53.2	435	7.0	2	2	73.0	13	73	5.6	0
2011	BUF	3	0	0−0	3	8	37.5	25	3.1	0	1	6.8	1	8	8.0	0
2012	BUF	4	0	0−0	3	5	60.0	30	6.0	0	0	77.1	1	−1	−1.0	0
2014	CLE	0	0	DNP												
Career		29	12	1−11	275	509	54.0	3,222	6.3	21	18	72.5	79	469	5.9	3

=== College ===
Year	Team	Passing						Rushing			
Year	Team	Cmp	Att	Yds	TD	Int	Rtg	Att	Yds	Avg	TD
2003	Coastal Carolina	58	136	705	5	4	92.4	81	282	3.5	3
2004	Coastal Carolina	78	158	1,008	8	4	114.6	55	251	4.6	1
2005	Coastal Carolina	133	246	1,589	11	6	118.2	97	437	4.5	4
2006	Coastal Carolina	217	339	3,296	29	11	167.4	113	656	5.8	4
Totals		486	879	6,598	53	25	132.6	346	1626	4.7	13
