= Yeremiah Bell =

American football player (born 1978)

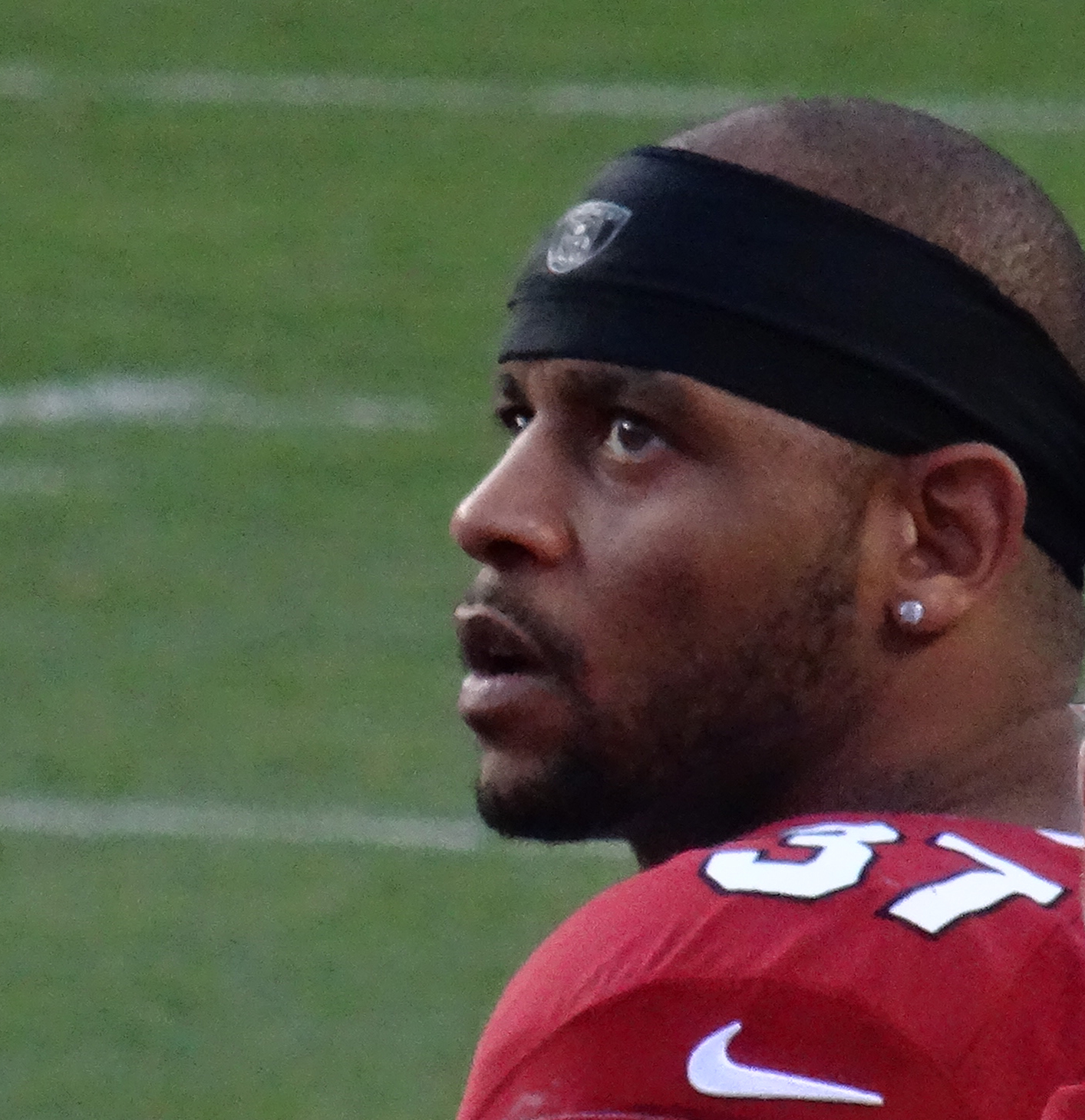
- Bell with the Arizona Cardinals in 2013

No. 37
- Position: Safety

Personal information
- Born: March 3, 1978 (age 48); Winchester, Kentucky, U.S.
- Listed height: 6 ft 0 in (1.83 m)
- Listed weight: 205 lb (93 kg)

Career information
- High school: Clark (Winchester)
- College: Eastern Kentucky
- NFL draft: 2003: 6th round, 213th overall pick

Career history
- Miami Dolphins (2003–2011); New York Jets (2012); Arizona Cardinals (2013)

Awards and highlights
- Pro Bowl (2009); Inducted into KY Pro Football HOF (2010)

Career NFL statistics
- Total tackles: 729
- Sacks: 13.0
- Forced fumbles: 9
- Fumble recoveries: 10
- Interceptions: 8
- Stats at Pro Football Reference

Yeremiah Neavius Bell (born March 3, 1978) is an American former professional football player who was a safety in the National Football League (NFL). He played college football for the Eastern Kentucky Colonels and was selected by the Miami Dolphins in the sixth round of the 2003 NFL draft.

Bell played for the Dolphins for nine seasons, seeing no game action during his rookie year before spending the next two seasons as a backup. He became a starter in 2006. After missing most of the 2007 season due to injury, Bell was selected to the Pro Bowl in 2008. He then remained with the Dolphins as a starter for three further seasons. After being released by the Dolphins after the 2011 season, he spent the next two seasons with the New York Jets and Arizona Cardinals, respectively.

== Early life ==
Bell attended George Rogers Clark High School in Winchester, Kentucky, where he was a three-year letterman in football as a defensive back and wide receiver. He also lettered in basketball as well as in baseball, starting as a senior with former Major League pitcher Matt Ginter.

Bell was not highly recruited while in high school, and without a full scholarship offer he began doing hard labor in a central Kentucky steel mill for $8 per hour.

== College career ==
After two years of working in the steel mill, Bell enrolled at nearby Eastern Kentucky University and attempted to walk-on the Eastern Kentucky Colonels football team. Bell made the team, but contemplated quitting during two-a-day practices his freshman year. Eventually Bell would remain on the team and excel in the defensive backfield. In his three-year college career Bell was a finalist for the 2001 Buck Buchanan Award as the Division I-AA Defensive Player of the Year. He was also named a 2001 All-American, two time All-Ohio Valley Conference safety (2000–01), and was the OVC defensive player of the year (2001). Before his senior season in 2002 Bell injured his knee in a pick-up basketball game ending his college career.

=== Awards and honors ===
- Eastern Kentucky Defensive Back of the Year (1999)
- 2× All-Ohio Valley Conference (2000, 2001)
- Eastern Kentucky Defensive Most Valuable Player (2000)
- Associated Press All-American (2001)
- Ohio Valley Conference Defensive Player of the Year (2001)
- Named to the Eastern Kentucky University All-Century team as a Defensive Back (2009)

== Professional career ==
Pre-draft measurables
Height	Weight	Vertical jump
5 ft 11 1/2 in (1.82 m)	193 lb (88 kg)	34.0 in (0.86 m)
All values from Pro Day

=== Miami Dolphins ===
==== 2003 ====
Bell was selected in the sixth round by the Miami Dolphins and signed to the team's practice squad.

==== 2004 ====
Bell played in 13 games recording 10 tackles in primarily a special teams and reserve role before suffering a broken leg late in the season.

==== 2005 ====
In his first injury free NFL season, Bell played in all 16 games registered 21 tackles, three sacks, an interception, four passes defensed, a fumble recovery and a forced fumble. He finished second on the squad with 14 stops on special teams, where he also recovered a fumble. The initial interception of his NFL career came vs. New England Patriots (11/13) when he picked off a Tom Brady pass in the fourth quarter, leading to a Dolphins touchdown six plays later.

==== 2006 ====
Bell earned a starting spot in Dolphins secondary. In his first season as a starter Bell has recorded 62 tackles, 2 sacks, and 11 passes defended. Dolphins defensive standout Jason Taylor said of Bell, "The guy just makes plays, no matter if it's special teams, defense or whatever. He always makes plays for us."

==== 2007 ====
In 2007 Bell was a restricted free agent and he signed a tender that he received from the Dolphins. Bell was the starter at strong safety but suffered a torn Achilles tendon in the season opener on September 9 that ended his season. He was placed on injured reserve on September 11. Bell finished the season with 5 tackles.

==== 2008 ====
After the 2007 season Bell became an unrestricted free agent but he did not receive much interest from other teams because of his torn Achilles tendon. The Dolphins re-signed him to a one-year, 1.4 million dollar contract on March 3. In 2008, Bell became a force to be reckoned with. He finished the season with 120 tackles, 1 sack, and three forced fumbles, & while he did not have any picks that year, his return from injury proved to be the stabilizing force in the secondary.

==== 2009 ====
Miami's leading tackler in 2008, and 2009, Bell signed a four-year, $20 million contract with the Dolphins on the eve of free agency. The deal included $10 million in guaranteed money. He finished the season with 114 tackles, 1.5 sacks, and 3 interceptions. In 2009 Bell received a Pro Bowl selection after Antoine Bethea and the Indianapolis Colts went to the Super Bowl.

==== 2010 ====
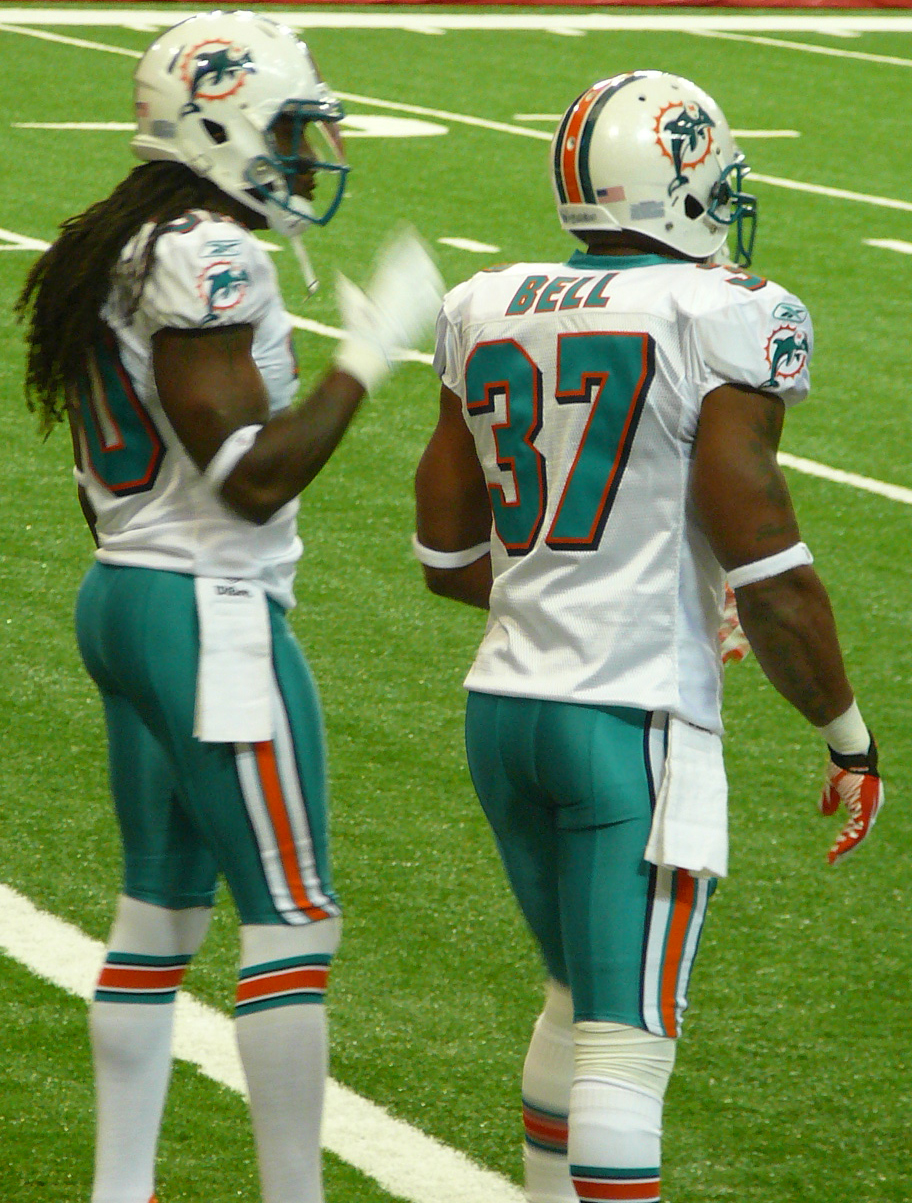
Bell (right) with fellow Dolphins starter Chris Clemons in 2011.

In 2010, Bell started all 16 games, recording 101 tackles, 1.5 sacks, two forced fumbles with one recovery and one interception.

==== 2011 ====
After starting all games and recording 107 total tackles for the 2011 season, Bell was released after the season on March 19, 2012.

=== New York Jets ===
==== 2012 ====
Bell was signed by the New York Jets on May 18, 2012, to a one-year $1.4 million contract.

=== Arizona Cardinals ===
==== 2013 ====
Bell signed with the Arizona Cardinals on March 13, 2013.

=== Retirement ===
On August 9, 2014, Bell announced that he would be retiring from the NFL.

== NFL career statistics ==
Legend
**Bold**	Career high

=== Regular season ===
Year	Team	Games		Tackles					Interceptions					Fumbles			
Year	Team	GP	GS	Cmb	Solo	Ast	Sck	TFL	Int	Yds	TD	Lng	PD	FF	FR	Yds	TD
2004	MIA	13	0	10	8	2	0.0	0	0	0	0	0	1	0	0	0	0
2005	MIA	**16**	0	35	21	14	**3.0**	2	1	0	0	0	3	1	2	12	0
2006	MIA	**16**	11	70	46	24	2.0	1	0	0	0	0	**12**	**3**	2	0	0
2007	MIA	1	1	5	4	1	0.0	0	0	0	0	0	0	0	0	0	0
2008	MIA	**16**	**16**	**120**	**100**	20	1.0	3	0	0	0	0	10	**3**	1	0	0
2009	MIA	**16**	15	114	92	22	1.5	3	**3**	**48**	0	**29**	8	0	0	0	0
2010	MIA	**16**	**16**	101	83	18	1.5	4	1	21	0	21	5	2	1	4	0
2011	MIA	**16**	**16**	107	81	**26**	2.0	2	1	20	0	20	4	0	1	0	0
2012	NYJ	**16**	**16**	90	73	17	1.0	3	0	0	0	0	2	0	**3**	**18**	0
2013	ARI	**16**	**16**	77	61	16	1.0	**5**	2	6	0	6	9	0	0	0	0
		142	107	729	569	160	13.0	23	8	95	0	29	54	9	10	34	0

=== Playoffs ===
Year	Team	Games		Tackles					Interceptions					Fumbles			
Year	Team	GP	GS	Cmb	Solo	Ast	Sck	TFL	Int	Yds	TD	Lng	PD	FF	FR	Yds	TD
2008	MIA	**1**	**1**	**3**	**2**	**1**	0.0	0	0	0	0	0	**1**	0	0	0	0
		1	1	3	2	1	0.0	0	0	0	0	0	1	0	0	0	0

== Personal ==
Bell has a daughter, Yamia, born July 23, 2000, and a son, Brayden, born December 15, 2003.
