= Koa Misi =

American football player (born 1987)

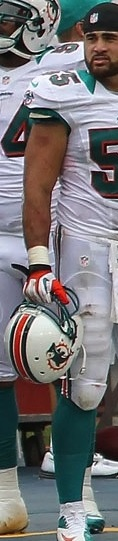
- Misi with the Miami Dolphins in 2012

No. 55
- Position: Linebacker

Personal information
- Born: January 17, 1987 (age 39); Santa Rosa, California, U.S.
- Listed height: 6 ft 3 in (1.91 m)
- Listed weight: 254 lb (115 kg)

Career information
- High school: Montgomery (Santa Rosa)
- College: Utah
- NFL draft: 2010: 2nd round, 40th overall pick

Career history
- Miami Dolphins (2010–2017)

Awards and highlights
- PFWA All-Rookie Team (2010); First-team All-MW (2009); Second-team All-MW (2008)

Career NFL statistics
- Total tackles: 360
- Sacks: 12
- Forced fumbles: 3
- Fumble recoveries: 2
- Defensive touchdowns: 1
- Stats at Pro Football Reference

Nawa'akoa Lisiate Foti Analeseanoa "Koa" Misi (born January 17, 1987) is an American former professional football player who was a linebacker for the Miami Dolphins of the National Football League (NFL). He played college football for the Utah Utes. He was selected by the Dolphins in the second round of the 2010 NFL draft.

== College career ==
After graduation from Montgomery High School, Misi began his college career at Santa Rosa Junior College, where he was a first-team all-conference defensive end. He then attended the University of Utah and played for the Utes for three years (2007–2009). While at Utah, he played in 38 of 39 games, missing one game due to injury, and started 36 of those games. He played at both defensive end and defensive tackle positions during his college career. He was twice selected as an all-conference player in the Mountain West Conference, second-team all-conference in 2008 and first-team all-conference in 2009.

== Professional career ==
On April 23, 2010, Misi was selected by the Miami Dolphins with a second round pick in the 2010 NFL draft with the 40th overall pick.

Pre-draft measurables
Height	Weight	40-yard dash	10-yard split	20-yard split	20-yard shuttle	Three-cone drill	Vertical jump	Broad jump
6 ft 2 1/2 in (1.89 m)	251 lb (114 kg)	4.75 s	1.64 s	2.76 s	4.27 s	7.07 s	38 in (0.97 m)	10 ft 7 in (3.23 m)
All values from NFL Combine

On September 19, 2010, Misi's second career game in the NFL, he recovered a Brett Favre fumble in the end zone for a touchdown giving the Dolphins a 14–0 lead. Misi also had two tackles. On September 7, 2013, Misi signed a four-year, $17 million contract extension with the Dolphins. Due to a back injury, Misi was placed on the team's injured reserve on December 22, 2015. On October 10, 2016, Misi was placed on injured reserve due to a neck injury.

On July 25, 2017, the Dolphins placed Misi on injured reserve with a neck injury.

=== NFL statistics ===
Year	Team	GP	Total	Solo	AST	Sacks	FF	FR	Int	TD	PD
2010	MIA	16	41	29	12	4.5	0	2	0	1	2
2011	MIA	12	34	26	8	1.0	0	0	0	0	1
2012	MIA	14	65	50	15	3.5	3	0	0	0	2
2013	MIA	15	54	34	20	2.0	0	0	0	0	3
2014	MIA	11	66	50	16	1.0	0	0	0	0	1
2015	MIA	13	78	59	19	0.0	0	0	0	0	1
2016	MIA	3	22	11	11	0.0	0	0	0	0	0
Career		84	358	258	100	12.0	3	2	0	1	10
