= Marlon Moore =

American football player (born 1987)

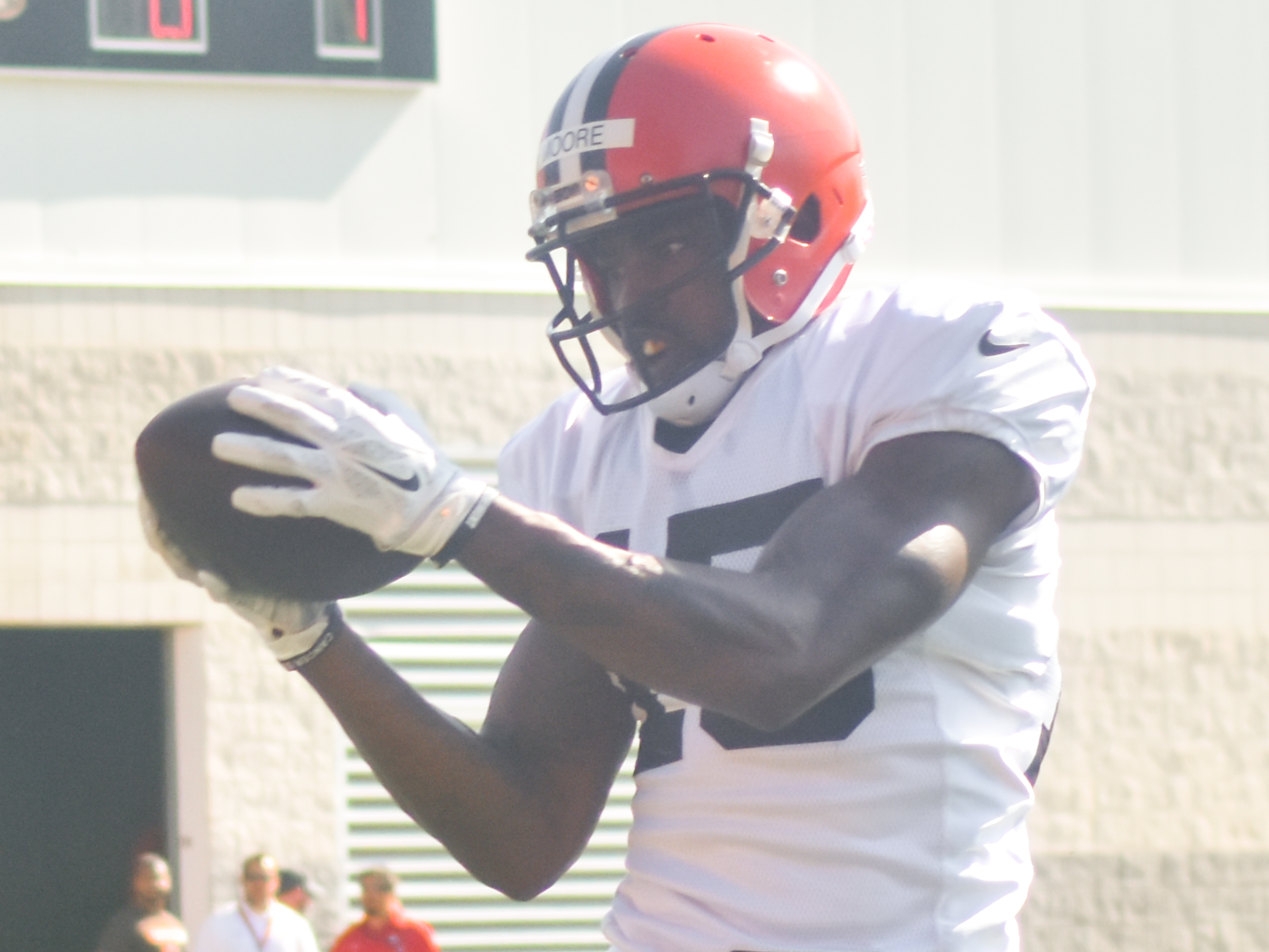
- Moore with the Browns in 2015

No. 14, 19, 15
- Position: Wide receiver

Personal information
- Born: September 3, 1987 (age 39); Sacramento, California, U.S.
- Listed height: 6 ft 0 in (1.83 m)
- Listed weight: 190 lb (86 kg)

Career information
- High school: Natomas (Sacramento)
- College: Fresno State
- NFL draft: 2010: undrafted

Career history
- Miami Dolphins (2010–2012); San Francisco 49ers (2013); Miami Dolphins (2013); Cleveland Browns (2014–2015)

Career NFL statistics
- Receptions: 26
- Receiving yards: 387
- Receiving touchdowns: 3
- Stats at Pro Football Reference

Marlon Moore (born September 3, 1987) is an American former professional football player who was a wide receiver in the National Football League (NFL). He played college football for the Fresno State Bulldogs and was signed by the Miami Dolphins as an undrafted free agent in 2010. Moore also played for the San Francisco 49ers and Cleveland Browns.

== Early life ==
Moore was born in Sacramento, California, and attended Sacramento (CA) Natomas high school where he excelled in football. He then committed to Fresno State where he finished his college career.

== Professional career ==
=== Miami Dolphins (first stint) ===
Having gone undrafted in the 2009 NFL draft, Moore signed with the Miami Dolphins as an undrafted free agent. Moore, who is known for his agility and quickness, was utilized primarily in special teams and a reserve receiver. Moore had a career highlight 37-yard reception from Matt Moore during the 2011 season. Moore had finished his career with the Dolphins with 12 receptions for 244 yards and 2 touchdowns, averaging 20.3 yards per reception. Moore was an unrestricted free agent at the conclusion of the 2012 season.

=== San Francisco 49ers ===
On March 19, 2013, it was announced that Moore had signed a one-year deal with the San Francisco 49ers. He was released in October 2013 due to Mario Manningham's return to the team's active roster after week 7.

=== Miami Dolphins (second stint) ===
Moore re-signed with the Dolphins on November 4, 2013 to a one-year contract, one week after getting released by the 49ers. He appeared in the team's last eight games, catching six passes as a reserve wide receiver, and again returned to his role as a special teams ace for the club.

=== Cleveland Browns ===
Moore signed with the Cleveland Browns on July 28, 2014. On September 3, 2016, he was released by the Browns.
