= Ikaika Alama-Francis =

American football player (born 1984)

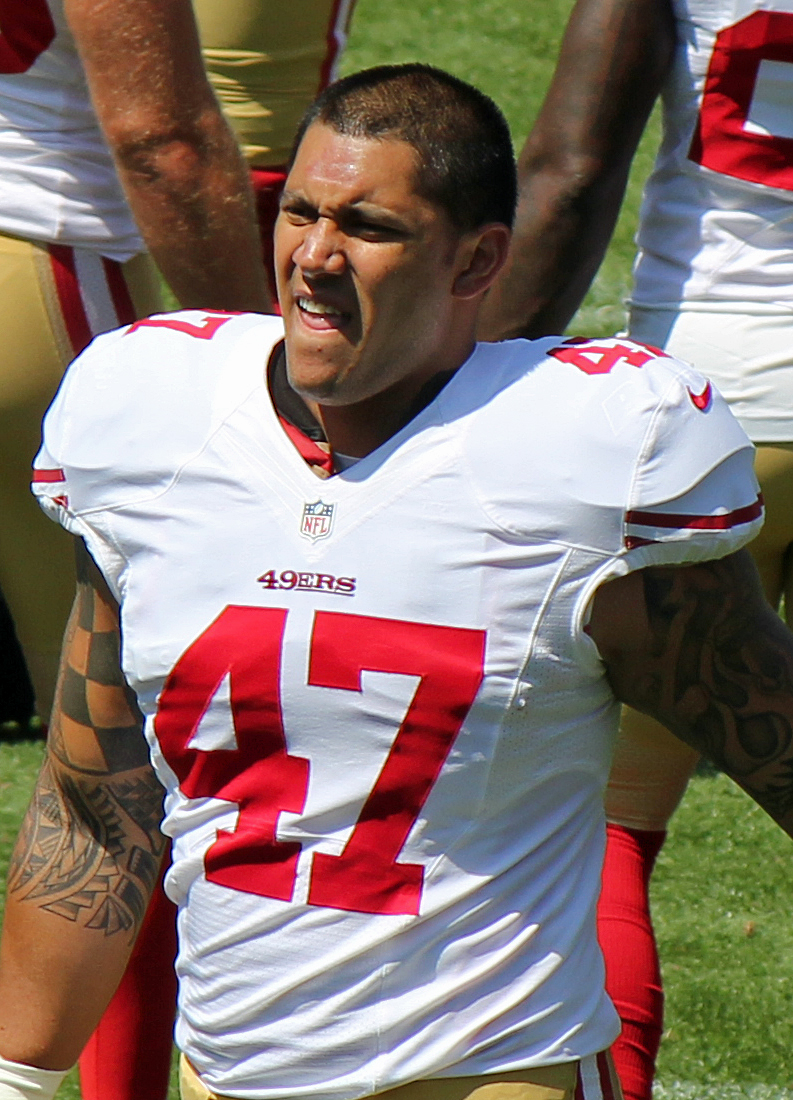
- Alama-Francis with the San Francisco 49ers in the 2012 preseason

No. 91, 97, 59
- Position: Defensive end

Personal information
- Born: December 4, 1984 (age 41); Kāne'ohe, Hawai'i, U.S.
- Listed height: 6 ft 5 in (1.96 m)
- Listed weight: 280 lb (127 kg)

Career information
- High school: Kalaheo (Kailua, Hawaii)
- College: Hawaii
- NFL draft: 2007: 2nd round, 58th overall pick

Career history
- Detroit Lions (2007–2008); Miami Dolphins (2009–2011); San Francisco 49ers (2012)*
- * Offseason or practice squad member only

Awards and highlights
- First-team All-WAC (2006); Second-team All-WAC (2005)

Career NFL statistics
- Total tackles: 48
- Sacks: 1
- Fumble recoveries: 1
- Stats at Pro Football Reference

Brent Ikaika Alama-Francis (born December 4, 1984) is an American former professional football player who was a defensive end in the National Football League (NFL). He played college football for the Hawaii Warriors and was selected by the Detroit Lions in the second round of the 2007 NFL draft.

== Early life ==
Alama-Francis was born to former Green Bay Packers backup quarterback and former high school football coach Joseph "Joe" Francis and Rolenda "Ku'ulei" Alama-Francis. He has three older half-brothers from Joe Francis's first wife and two older brothers from Joe's second wife, Kuulei. His much older brother is Jon Francis, who played running back for the Los Angeles Rams. Another child, Makana, joined the family after Ikaika went to college. While playing basketball and volleyball for Kalaheo High School, he made the All-State High School basketball and volleyball teams his junior and senior years.

== College career ==
Even though he was recruited to play basketball for New Mexico and Portland State, Alama-Francis started his career at Hawaii after graduating from high school in 2002 as a walk on to the Warrior basketball team. He played forward mostly at the end of games that were already decided.

Alama-Francis decided to try out for the football team during spring training after his first and only season with Warrior Basketball. The elder Francis was a bit skeptical due to Alama-Francis relatively small size and lack of experience with football physicality as a basketball player. Even though Warrior coach June Jones offered Alama-Francis a scholarship coming out of high school with no high school playing experience, Alama-Francis and his father, Joe Francis, refused the offer because they did not feel that Alama-Francis was ready. The elder Francis told the coach that his son needed to earn the scholarship.

Alama-Francis gained 70 pounds over the years to build his 190-pound frame to 260 pounds. He also worked on building his strength and football defensive end knowledge to become a starter his junior and senior year. At the beginning of Alama-Francis' senior year, he was chosen by Coach Jones to represent the University of Hawaii at media day for the Western Athletic Conference at the start of the 2006 season. In his 26 starts at Hawaii he had a total of 112 tackles (62 solos) with 10 sacks.

== Professional career ==
=== Detroit Lions ===
During the 2007 mini-camp, Alama-Francis could not participate in team organized activities due to a pectoral muscle tear suffered during the Hula Bowl. Instead he worked with head Coach Rod Marinelli and the defensive coaching staff on developing his skills. Alama-Francis impressed the coaches and teammates with his work ethic and positive demeanor.

Alama-Francis remained inactive for 10 of the first 12 games of the season. In the 4 games he played in, he recorded 12 tackles.

For the 2008 season, Alama-Francis switched his uniform number from 91 to 97, after the departure of Boss Bailey who had previously worn 97.

Alama-Francis was released from the team on September 6, 2009.

=== Miami Dolphins ===
Alama-Francis was signed by the Miami Dolphins on November 24, 2009 for a salary of $460,000. The Dolphins tried changing his position from defensive end to outside linebacker. He competed with teammate Koa Misi for a starting position.

In the 2010-2011 season, the Dolphins gave him a contract extension.

=== San Francisco 49ers ===
On August 15, 2012, Alama-Francis was signed by the San Francisco 49ers to a one-year deal. He was released on August 31, 2012.
