= 2009 Miami Dolphins season =

44th season in franchise history

- General manager: Jeff Ireland
- Head coach: Tony Sparano
- Home stadium: Land Shark Stadium

Results
- Record: 7–9
- Division place: 3rd AFC East
- Playoffs: Did not qualify
- All-Pros: Jake Long (2nd team)
- Pro Bowlers: OT Jake Long; S Yeremiah Bell; K Dan Carpenter

The 2009 Miami Dolphins season was the franchise's 40th season in the National Football League (NFL), the 44th overall and the second under head coach Tony Sparano. The Dolphins entered the 2009 season as the reigning AFC East champions after posting an 11–5 record in 2008. Dropping by four more games, the Dolphins failed to make the playoffs for the first time since 2007, marking the 25th consecutive year that the region hosting the Super Bowl did not see its host team play in, thus it set off a playoff drought that lasted until 2016 (not counting years where Super Bowls have been played on neutral sites).

== Offseason personnel moves ==
=== Coaching staff ===
The Dolphins fired offensive line coach Mike Maser on January 14, 2009, just one year after he was hired to head coach Tony Sparano's staff. During Maser's lone season with the Dolphins, the team had the 12th-best offense in the league with 345.6 yards per game. A day after firing Maser, the team hired Dave DeGuglielmo, who had been the assistant offensive line coach for the New York Giants, as their new offensive line coach.

After kicking coach Steve Hoffman left the team to join the Kansas City Chiefs, the Dolphins hired University of Rhode Island head coach Darren Rizzi as the assistant special teams coach on February 21.

=== Players ===
==== Re-signings ====
- January 5 – Re-signed wide receiver Anthony Armstrong, cornerback Scorpio Babers, cornerback Will Billingsley, fullback Chris Brown, defensive tackle Joe Cohen, running back Lex Hilliard and wide receiver Todd Lowber.
- February 20 – Re-signed offensive tackle Vernon Carey.
- February 25 – Re-signed linebacker Channing Crowder.
- February 27 – Re-signed safety Yeremiah Bell.
- May 16 – Signed fullback Lousaka Polite to a multi-year extension.
- May 26 – Signed cornerback Will Allen to a multi-year extension.
- June 22 – Signed safety Tyrone Culver to a multi-year extension.

==== Signings ====
- January 6 – Claimed linebacker Tearrius George off waivers from the New Orleans Saints.
- January 19 – Signed safety Ethan Kilmer (Bengals) and linebacker Cameron Wake (BC Lions).
- February 25 – Signed safety Gibril Wilson (Raiders).
- February 27 – Signed guard Joe Berger (Cowboys).
- March 3 – Signed center Jake Grove (Raiders).
- March 12 – Signed cornerback Eric Green (Cardinals).
- April 25 – Signed punter Jy Bond (Australia).
- May 13 – Signed linebacker Jason Taylor (Redskins).

==== Departures ====
- February 10 – Waived guard Matt McChesney and linebacker Kelvin Smith.
- March 2 – Terminated the contract of defensive end Vonnie Holliday.
- April 27 – Released quarterback John Beck.
- June 1 – Released wide receiver Todd Lowber.
- June 15 – Released cornerback Scorpio Babers and punter Jy Bond.

==== Trades ====
- March 19 – Acquired defensive tackle Tony McDaniel from the Jacksonville Jaguars in exchange for seventh-round pick in the 2009 NFL draft.
- March 23 – Traded center Samson Satele to the Oakland Raiders in exchange for a sixth-round pick and a swap of fourth-round picks in the 2009 NFL draft.

==== Free agents ====
UFA: Unrestricted free agent, RFA: Restricted free agent, ERFA: Exclusive-rights free agent

Position	Player	Free agency status	Date signed	2009 team
SS	Yeremiah Bell	UFA	2/26	Miami Dolphins
OT	Vernon Carey	UFA	2/20	Miami Dolphins
LB	Channing Crowder	UFA	2/25	Miami Dolphins
CB	André Goodman	UFA	3/1	Denver Broncos
TE	Aaron Halterman	ERFA		
FS	Renaldo Hill	UFA	2/27	Denver Broncos
C	Al Johnson	UFA	3/17	New England Patriots
LB	Quentin Moses	ERFA	3/31	Miami Dolphins
G	Ike Ndukwe	ERFA	3/20	Miami Dolphins
WR	Tab Perry	UFA		
LB	Derek Smith	UFA		

= Retained by Dolphins

==== 2009 NFL draft ====
Originally slated to have the 26th overall pick in the 2009 NFL draft, the Dolphins' pick moved up one spot to 25th after the Arizona Cardinals and Philadelphia Eagles made it to the NFC Championship. Both the Cardinals (9–7) and Eagles (9–6–1) were projected to pick before the Dolphins (11–5), but with one guaranteed to make the Super Bowl (and thus pick 31st or 32nd depending on the outcome) the Dolphins moved up one position in the draft.

Draft		Name	Position	College	Height	Weight
Rnd	Pick	Name	Position	College	Height	Weight
1	25	Vontae Davis	CB	Illinois	5'11"	203
2	44	Pat White	QB/WR	West Virginia	6'0"	197
2	61	Sean Smith	CB	Utah	6'4"	215
3	87	Patrick Turner	WR	USC	6'5"	220
4	108	Brian Hartline	WR	Ohio State	6'3"	188
5	161	John Nalbone	TE	Monmouth	6'4"	255
5	165	Chris Clemons	FS	Clemson	6'1"	210
6	181	Andrew Gardner	OT	Georgia Tech	6'6"	305
7	214	J. D. Folsom	ILB	Weber State	6'3"	230

Notes

- The Dolphins acquired Washington's 2009 second-round pick when they traded defensive end Jason Taylor in July 2008.
- The Dolphins traded their 2009 sixth-round pick to the Dallas Cowboys when they acquired defensive tackle Jason Ferguson in February 2008.
- The Dolphins acquired Cleveland's 2009 seventh-round pick when they traded cornerback Travis Daniels in August 2008.
- The Dolphins acquired Carolina's 2009 seventh-round pick when they traded quarterback Josh McCown in August 2008.
- The Dolphins traded its second-round selection (56th overall) to Indianapolis for their second- and fifth-round selection (61st and 165th overall, respectively).
- The Dolphins traded their second 2009 seventh-round selection (237th pick) to Kansas City for a 2010 seventh-round selection.

==== Draft pick signings ====
- May 21 – Signed tight end John Nalbone to a four-year contract.
- June 18 – Signed offensive tackle Andrew Gardner to a four-year contract.
- July 3 – Signed wide receiver Patrick Turner to a four-year contract.
- July 3 – Signed linebacker J. D. Folsom to a four-year contract.
- July 15 – Signed wide receiver Brian Hartline to a four-year contract.
- July 24 – Signed cornerback Sean Smith to a four-year contract.
- August 1 – Signed cornerback Vontae Davis to a five-year contract.
- August 2 – Signed quarterback Pat White to a four-year contract.
- August 2 – Signed safety Chris Clemons to a four-year contract.

==== Undrafted free agents ====
Following the 2009 NFL draft, the Dolphins signed the following nine undrafted free agents on April 30:

- DE Ryan Baker (Purdue)
- TE Jared Bronson (Central Washington)
- NT Louis Ellis (Shaw)
- RB Anthony Kimble (Stanford)
- OG Mark Lewis (Oregon)
- RB Rob Lewis (University of Virginia)
- WR Brennan Marion (Tulsa)
- DE Orion Martin (Virginia Tech)
- OT SirVincent Rogers (Houston)
- WR Chris Williams (New Mexico State)

The team later signed guard J. D. Quinn (Montana) on May 11. Two of the undrafted rookies left the team shortly after signing, with Bronson failing to report to training camp on August 2 and Rogers opting for retirement on August 6.

== Training camp and preseason ==
=== Opening camp roster ===
Miami Dolphins 2009 opening training camp roster
Quarterbacks: 7 Chad Henne; 10 Chad Pennington; 6 Pat White; Running backs: 20 Chris Brown FB; 23 Ronnie Brown; 38 Patrick Cobbs; 26 Lex Hilliard; 45 Anthony Kimble; 36 Lousaka Polite FB; 34 Ricky Williams; Wide receivers: 11 Anthony Armstrong; 15 Davone Bess; 83 Greg Camarillo; 19 Ted Ginn Jr.; 82 Brian Hartline; 17 Brandon London; 14 Brennan Marion; 84 Patrick Turner; 87 Chris Williams; Tight ends: 80 Anthony Fasano; 81 Joey Haynos; 88 David Martin; 86 John Nalbone; 18 Ernest Wilford	Offensive linemen: 57 Andy Alleman C; 67 Joe Berger G; 72 Vernon Carey T; 76 Brandon Frye G; 63 Andrew Gardner T; 75 Nate Garner T; 64 Jake Grove C; 60 Mark Lewis G; 77 Jake Long T; 61 Shawn Murphy G; 68 Ike Ndukwe G; 73 SirVincent Rogers T; 65 Justin Smiley G; 66 Donald Thomas G; Defensive linemen: 79 Ryan Baker DE; 62 Joe Cohen NT; 71 Lionel Dotson NT; 93 Louis Ellis NT; 95 Jason Ferguson NT; 70 Kendall Langford DE; 78 Tony McDaniel NT; 97 Phillip Merling DE; 74 Quentin Moses DE; 96 Paul Soliai NT; 94 Randy Starks DE; 90 Rodrique Wright DE	Linebackers: 56 Charlie Anderson OLB; 51 Akin Ayodele ILB; 52 Channing Crowder ILB; 59 J. D. Folsom ILB; 49 Tearrius George OLB; 58 William Kershaw ILB; 48 Orion Martin OLB; 55 Joey Porter OLB; 99 Jason Taylor OLB/DE; 53 Reggie Torbor ILB; 50 Erik Walden OLB; 91 Cameron Wake OLB; Defensive backs: 32 Jason Allen CB/; 25 Will Allen CB; 37 Yeremiah Bell SS; 27 Will Billingsley CB; 47 Courtney Bryan S; 30 Chris Clemons FS; 29 Tyrone Culver S; 24 Vontae Davis CB; 21 Eric Green CB; 33 Nathan Jones CB; 43 Ethan Kilmer FS; 31 Sean Smith CB; 22 Joey Thomas CB; 28 Gibril Wilson FS; Special teams: 5 Dan Carpenter K; 92 John Denney LS; 2 Brandon Fields P	Reserve lists: 89 Jared Bronson (did not report); 98 Matt Roth OLB (active/NF-Inj.); Rookies in italics

=== Final preseason roster ===
Miami Dolphins 2009 final preseason roster
Quarterbacks: 7 Chad Henne; 10 Chad Pennington; 6 Pat White; Running backs: 23 Ronnie Brown; 38 Patrick Cobbs; 26 Lex Hilliard; 36 Lousaka Polite FB; 34 Ricky Williams; Wide receivers: 15 Davone Bess; 83 Greg Camarillo; 19 Ted Ginn Jr.; 82 Brian Hartline; 17 Brandon London; 14 James Robinson; 84 Patrick Turner; Tight ends: 80 Anthony Fasano; 81 Joey Haynos; 88 David Martin; 86 John Nalbone	Offensive linemen: 67 Joe Berger C; 72 Vernon Carey T; 76 Brandon Frye G; 63 Andrew Gardner T; 75 Nate Garner T; 64 Jake Grove C; 60 Mark Lewis G; 77 Jake Long T; 61 Shawn Murphy G; 65 Justin Smiley G; 66 Donald Thomas G; Defensive linemen: 79 Ryan Baker DE; 71 Lionel Dotson NT; 95 Jason Ferguson NT; 70 Kendall Langford DE; 78 Tony McDaniel NT; 97 Phillip Merling DE; 74 Quentin Moses DE; 96 Paul Soliai NT; 94 Randy Starks DE; 90 Rodrique Wright DE	Linebackers: 56 Charlie Anderson OLB; 51 Akin Ayodele ILB; 52 Channing Crowder ILB; 59 J. D. Folsom ILB; 58 William Kershaw ILB; 55 Joey Porter OLB; 99 Jason Taylor OLB; 53 Reggie Torbor ILB; 50 Erik Walden OLB; 91 Cameron Wake OLB; Defensive backs: 32 Jason Allen CB; 25 Will Allen CB; 37 Yeremiah Bell SS; 27 Will Billingsley CB; 47 Courtney Bryan SS; 30 Chris Clemons SS; 29 Tyrone Culver FS; 24 Vontae Davis CB; 33 Nathan Jones CB; 31 Sean Smith CB; 22 Joey Thomas CB; 28 Gibril Wilson FS; Special teams: 5 Dan Carpenter K; 92 John Denney LS; 2 Brandon Fields P	Reserve lists: 89 Jared Bronson TE (did not report); 43 Ethan Kilmer FS (Left Squad); 40 Joe Kowalewski FB (IR); -- Brennan Marion WR (IR); 98 Matt Roth OLB (active/NF-Inj.); Rookies in italics

=== Transactions ===
- August 2 – Waived guard J. D. Quinn and placed tight end Jared Bronson on the Reserve/Did Not Report list.
- August 4 – Placed linebacker Matt Roth on the Active/Non-Football Injury list.
- August 5 – Waived/injured wide receiver Brennan Marion.
- August 6 – Waived fullback Chris Brown and signed fullback Matt Quillen.
- August 6 – Placed wide receiver Brennan Marion on injured reserve. and offensive tackle SirVincent Rogers on the Reserve/Retired list.
- August 10 – Waived fullback Matt Quillen and signed wide receiver James Robinson and placekicker Connor Barth.
- August 11 – Signed fullback Joe Kowalewski.
- August 12 – Placed safety Ethan Kilmer on the Commissioner's Exemption list.
- August 19 – Released cornerback Eric Green.
- August 19 – Moved safety Ethan Kilmer to the Reserve/Left Squad list.
- August 24 – Waived running back Anthony Kimble, nose tackle Joe Cohen, linebacker Tearrius George and linebacker Orion Martin.
- August 24 – Waived/injured wide receiver Chris Williams.
- August 24 – Traded offensive lineman Andy Alleman and Ikechuku Ndukwe to the Kansas City Chiefs in exchange for an undisclosed 2010 NFL draft pick.
- August 25 – Released wide receiver Chris Williams with an injury settlement.
- August 29 – Waived wide receiver Anthony Armstrong, nose tackle Louis Ellis and placekicker Connor Barth.
- August 29 – Waived/injured fullback Joe Kowalewski.
- September 1 – Placed fullback Joe Kowalewski on injured reserve.
- September 5 – Waived or released safety Courtney Bryan, offensive tackle Brandon Frye, linebacker William Kershaw, wide receiver Brandon London, cornerback Joey Thomas, defensive end Rodrique Wright, offensive tackle Nate Garner, cornerback Will Billingsley, defensive end Ryan Baker, guard Mark Lewis, linebacker J. D. Folsom and wide receiver James Robinson.

== Preseason ==
=== Schedule ===
Week	Date	Opponent	Result	Record	Game site	NFL.com recap
1	August 17	Jacksonville Jaguars	W 12–9	1–0	Land Shark Stadium	Recap
2	August 22	Carolina Panthers	W 27–17	2–0	Land Shark Stadium	Recap
3	August 27	at Tampa Bay Buccaneers	W 10–6	3–0	Raymond James Stadium	Recap
4	September 3	at New Orleans Saints	W 10–7	4–0	Louisiana Superdome	Recap

== Regular season ==
=== Schedule ===
Week	Date	Opponent	Result	Record	Game site	NFL.com recap
1	September 13	at Atlanta Falcons	L 7–19	0–1	Georgia Dome	Recap
2	September 21	Indianapolis Colts	L 23–27	0–2	Land Shark Stadium	Recap
3	September 27	at San Diego Chargers	L 13–23	0–3	Qualcomm Stadium	Recap
4	October 4	Buffalo Bills	W 38–10	1–3	Land Shark Stadium	Recap
5	October 12	New York Jets	W 31–27	2–3	Land Shark Stadium	Recap
6	Bye					
7	October 25	New Orleans Saints	L 34–46	2–4	Land Shark Stadium	Recap
8	November 1	at New York Jets	W 30–25	3–4	Giants Stadium	Recap
9	November 8	at New England Patriots	L 17–27	3–5	Gillette Stadium	Recap
10	November 15	Tampa Bay Buccaneers	W 25–23	4–5	Land Shark Stadium	Recap
11	November 19	at Carolina Panthers	W 24–17	5–5	Bank of America Stadium	Recap
12	November 29	at Buffalo Bills	L 14–31	5–6	Ralph Wilson Stadium	Recap
13	December 6	New England Patriots	W 22–21	6–6	Land Shark Stadium	Recap
14	December 13	at Jacksonville Jaguars	W 14–10	7–6	Jacksonville Municipal Stadium	Recap
15	December 20	at Tennessee Titans	L 24–27 (OT)	7–7	LP Field	Recap
16	December 27	Houston Texans	L 20–27	7–8	Land Shark Stadium	Recap
17	January 3	Pittsburgh Steelers	L 24–30	7–9	Land Shark Stadium	Recap

=== Standings ===
AFC East
	W	L	T	PCT	DIV	CONF	PF	PA	STK
^{(3)} New England Patriots	10	6	0	.625	4–2	7–5	427	285	L1
^{(5)} New York Jets	9	7	0	.563	2–4	7–5	348	236	W2
Miami Dolphins	7	9	0	.438	4–2	5–7	360	390	L3
Buffalo Bills	6	10	0	.375	2–4	4–8	258	326	W1

=== Game results ===
==== Week 1: at Atlanta Falcons ====
Quarter	1	2	3	4	Total
Dolphins	0	0	0	7	7
Falcons	0	10	6	3	19

at Georgia Dome, Atlanta

- Game time: 1:00 pm EDT
- Game weather: None (Domed Stadium)
- Game attendance: 67,606
- Referee: Walt Coleman
- TV announcers (CBS): Greg Gumbel & Dan Dierdorf

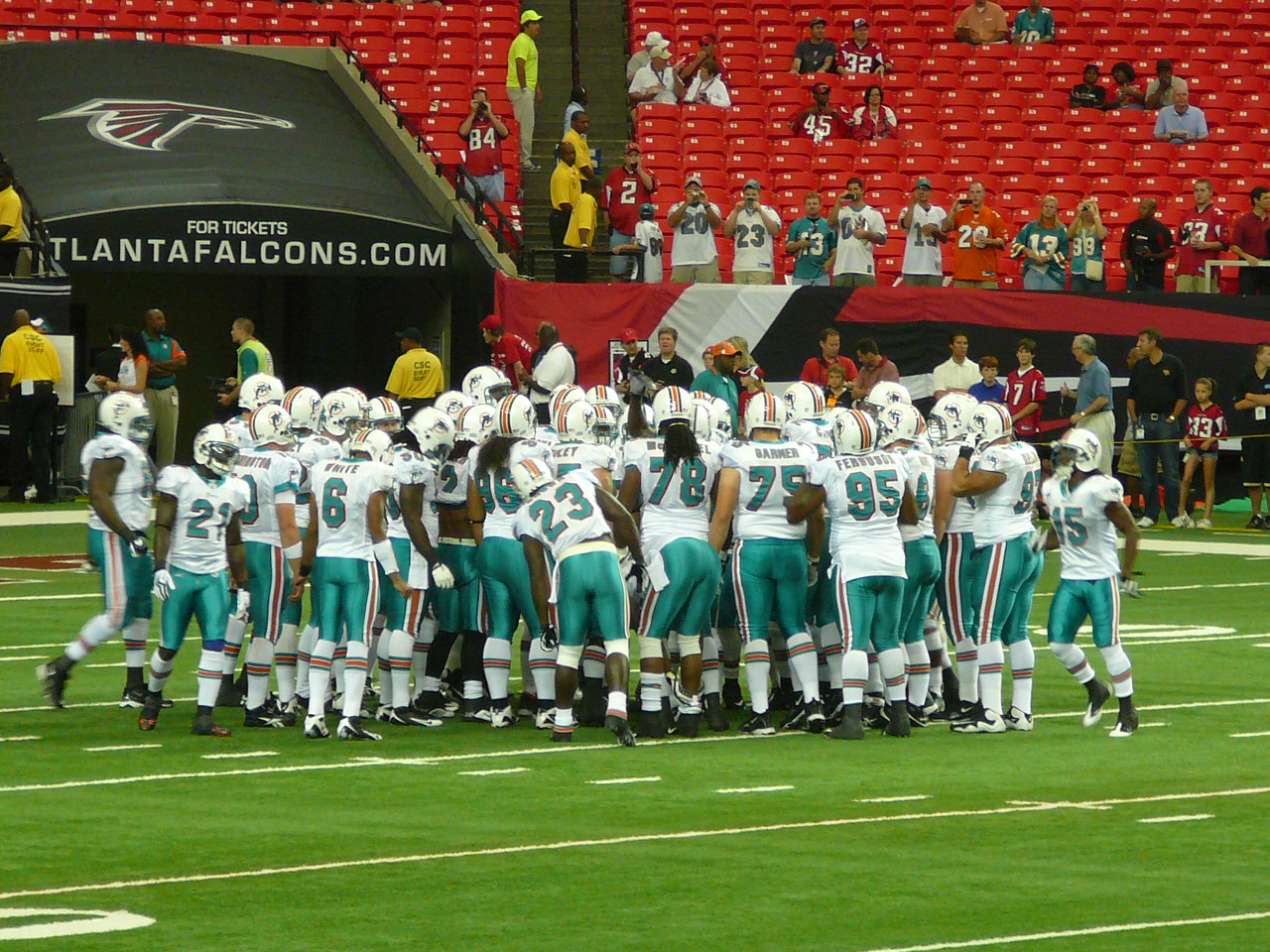
The Miami Dolphins preparing for the 2009 season opener in Atlanta.

After a great season for the Miami Dolphins in 2008, the Dolphins went to the Georgia Dome to take on 2008 playoff contenders, the Atlanta Falcons. After a scoreless first quarter, the Falcons got on the board with a 1-yard touchdown pass from Matt Ryan to fullback Ovie Mughelli in the second quarter. They also got a 36-yard field goal by kicker Jason Elam to make the score 10–0 at halftime. In the third quarter, Mike Peterson intercepted a Chad Pennington pass, which set up a 20-yard touchdown pass to tight end Tony Gonzalez and a 50-yard field goal by Jason Elam to make the score 19–0. Chad Pennington then hit a 9-yard touchdown pass to Ricky Williams.

The Falcons won the game 19–7 as the Dolphins started their season 0–1.

In 2008, no other team turned the ball over less than the Dolphins with only 13 turnovers, but in Week 1 Miami's offense had 4 turnovers, without having a single turnover on defense.

==== Week 2: vs. Indianapolis Colts ====
Quarter	1	2	3	4	Total
Colts	7	6	0	14	27
Dolphins	7	6	0	10	23

at Land Shark Stadium, Miami Gardens, Florida

- Game time: 8:30 pm EDT
- Game weather: 84 °F (29 °C) (Cloudy)
- Game attendance: 66,227
- Referee: Terry McAulay
- TV announcers (ESPN): Mike Tirico, Ron Jaworski, Jon Gruden, & Suzy Kolber

After a miserable loss to the Atlanta Falcons, the Dolphins host their home opener to the Indianapolis Colts. On the first play from scrimmage, Peyton Manning threw an 80-yard touchdown pass to tight end Dallas Clark. The Dolphins answered with a 14-yard touchdown run by Ronnie Brown out of the Wildcat Offense. The Dolphins and Colts kept going back and forth at each other with two field goals by Dan Carpenter and Adam Vinatieri to make the score 13–13 at halftime. After a scoreless third quarter, Ronnie Brown ran 2-yards for a touchdown to put Miami up 20–13. The Colts answered back with a 15-yard touchdown run by rookie running back Donald Brown. Miami than hit a 45-yard field goal by Dan Carpenter. But the Colts took the lead thanks to a 48-yard touchdown pass to Pierre Garçon. The Dolphins tried to rally at the end of the game but Chad Pennington was intercepted by Antoine Bethea to secure the Colts' victory.

The Colts won the game 27–23 as the Dolphins dropped to 0–2.

The Dolphins dominated the game in the time of possession battle, but lost the game with almost 50 minutes of offensive possession.

==== Week 3: at San Diego Chargers ====
Quarter	1	2	3	4	Total
Dolphins	0	3	3	7	13
Chargers	0	3	7	13	23

at Qualcomm Stadium, San Diego, California

- Game time: 4:15 pm EDT
- Game weather: 80 °F (27 °C) (Sunny)
- Game attendance: 67,230
- Referee: Bill Leavy
- TV announcers (CBS): Dick Enberg & Dan Fouts

Looking for their first win of the season, the Dolphins traveled to Qualcomm Stadium to take on the San Diego Chargers.

After a scoreless first quarter, Nate Kaeding hit a 25-yard field goal to score the first points of the game. Miami answered with a 24-yard field goal to tie the game at halftime 3–3. Miami took the lead after a 23-yard field goal by Dan Carpenter. But the Chargers retook the lead with a 5-yard touchdown run by Philip Rivers. The Chargers pulled away in the fourth quarter with two Nate Kaeding field goals and a 31-yard interception return by safety Eric Weddle. The Dolphins got a 14-yard touchdown run by Ricky Williams, but couldn't make a comeback.

The Chargers won the game 23–13 as the Dolphins fell to 0–3.

Dolphins quarterback Chad Pennington left the game with a shoulder injury after being hit by linebacker Kevin Burnett and was out for the season. The Dolphins chose Chad Henne to lead the Dolphins for the rest of the season.

==== Week 4: vs. Buffalo Bills ====
Quarter	1	2	3	4	Total
Bills	0	3	0	7	10
Dolphins	0	17	14	7	38

at Land Shark Stadium, Miami Gardens, Florida

- Game time: 4:05 pm EDT
- Game weather: 88 °F (31 °C) (Sunny)
- Game attendance: 65,523
- Referee: Carl Cheffers
- TV announcers (CBS): Kevin Harlan & Solomon Wilcots

The Miami Dolphins came off of a 0–3 start and tried to rebound against the Buffalo Bills. After a scoreless first quarter the Dolphins rallied quick with a 23-yard interception return for a touchdown by rookie Vontae Davis and a 1-yard touchdown run by Ronnie Brown along with a 33-yard field goal by Dan Carpenter making the halftime score 17–3. Miami continued with a Chad Henne touchdown pass to Brian Hartline and a 1-yard touchdown run by Ricky Williams. Trent Edwards hit Josh Reed for a 3-yard touchdown but Miami ended the game with a 1-yard touchdown run by Ronnie Brown.

The Dolphins won the game 38–10 as the team improved to 1–3.

Chad Henne made his first NFL start and threw for 115 yards and a touchdown.

==== Week 5: vs. New York Jets ====
Quarter	1	2	3	4	Total
Jets	7	6	0	14	27
Dolphins	10	0	0	21	31

at Land Shark Stadium, Miami Gardens, Florida

- Game time: 8:30 pm EDT
- Game weather: 83 °F (28 °C) (Clear)
- Game attendance: 69,767
- Referee: Alberto Riveron
- TV announcers (ESPN): Mike Tirico, Ron Jaworski, & Jon Gruden

Ronnie Brown ran in for the winning touchdown with just seconds left to send the Dolphins into their bye week at 2–3.

==== Week 7: vs. New Orleans Saints ====
Quarter	1	2	3	4	Total
Saints	3	7	14	22	46
Dolphins	14	10	10	0	34

at Land Shark Stadium, Miami Gardens, Florida

- Game time: 4:15 pm EDT
- Game weather: 89 °F (32 °C) (Sunny)
- Game attendance: 66,689
- Referee: John Parry
- TV announcers (Fox): Dick Stockton, Charles Davis, & Jaime Maggio

After they passed on signing him during the 2006 offseason, this was Saints quarterback Drew Brees' first time playing in Miami. With the surprising loss, the Dolphins dropped to 2–4.

==== Week 8: at New York Jets ====
Quarter	1	2	3	4	Total
Dolphins	0	3	21	6	30
Jets	0	3	16	6	25

at The Meadowlands, East Rutherford, New Jersey

- Game time: 1:00 pm EST
- Game weather: 54 °F (12 °C) (Cloudy)
- Game attendance: 77,531
- Referee: Don Carey
- TV announcers (CBS): Jim Nantz & Phil Simms

With their season sweep over the Jets, the Dolphins improved to 3–4.

==== Week 9: at New England Patriots ====
Quarter	1	2	3	4	Total
Dolphins	3	7	7	0	17
Patriots	7	9	8	3	27

at Gillette Stadium, Foxborough, Massachusetts

- Game time: 1:00 pm EST
- Game weather: 65 °F (18 °C) (Sunny)
- Game attendance: 68,756
- Referee: Mike Carey
- TV announcers (CBS): Greg Gumbel & Dan Dierdorf

With the loss, the Dolphins dropped to 3–5.

==== Week 10: vs. Tampa Bay Buccaneers ====
Quarter	1	2	3	4	Total
Buccaneers	3	3	3	14	23
Dolphins	6	13	0	6	25

at Land Shark Stadium, Miami Gardens, Florida

- Game time: 1:00 pm EST
- Game weather: 80 °F (27 °C) (Sunny)
- Game attendance: 66,085
- Referee: Tony Corrente
- TV announcers (Fox): Ron Pitts, John Lynch, & Laura Okmin

With the win, the Dolphins improved to 4–5.

==== Week 11: at Carolina Panthers ====
Quarter	1	2	3	4	Total
Dolphins	0	14	0	10	24
Panthers	3	0	0	14	17

at Bank of America Stadium, Charlotte, North Carolina

- Game time: 8:20 pm EST
- Game weather: 56 °F (13 °C) (Cloudy)
- Game attendance: 73,475
- Referee: Walt Anderson
- TV announcers (NFLN): Bob Papa & Matt Millen

With the win, the Dolphins improved to 5–5.

==== Week 12: at Buffalo Bills ====
Quarter	1	2	3	4	Total
Dolphins	0	7	7	0	14
Bills	0	7	0	24	31

at Ralph Wilson Stadium, Orchard Park, New York

- Game time: 1:00 pm EST
- Game weather: 49 °F (9 °C) (Sunny)
- Game attendance: 70,155
- Referee: Jeff Triplette
- TV announcers (CBS): Gus Johnson and Steve Tasker

With the loss, the Dolphins fell to 5–6.

==== Week 13: vs. New England Patriots ====
Quarter	1	2	3	4	Total
Patriots	7	7	7	0	21
Dolphins	0	10	9	3	22

at Land Shark Stadium, Miami Gardens, Florida

- Game time: 1:00 pm EST
- Game weather: 75 °F (24 °C) (Clear)
- Game attendance: 70,102
- Referee: Gene Steratore
- TV announcers (CBS): Jim Nantz & Phil Simms

With the win, the Dolphins improved to 6–6.

==== Week 14: at Jacksonville Jaguars ====
Quarter	1	2	3	4	Total
Dolphins	7	7	0	0	14
Jaguars	0	7	3	0	10

at Jacksonville Municipal Stadium, Jacksonville, Florida

- Game time: 1:00 pm EST
- Game weather: 75 °F (24 °C) (Sunny)
- Game attendance: 60,457
- Referee: Walt Coleman
- TV announcers (CBS): Kevin Harlan & Solomon Wilcots

With the win, the Dolphins improved to 7–6.

==== Week 15: at Tennessee Titans ====
Quarter	1	2	3	4	OT	Total
Dolphins	3	3	3	15	0	24
Titans	7	10	7	0	3	27

at LP Field, Nashville, Tennessee

- Game time: 1:00 pm EST
- Game weather: 35 °F (2 °C) (Cloudy)
- Game attendance: 69,143
- Referee: Scott Green
- TV announcers (CBS): Dick Enberg & Dan Fouts

With the loss, the Dolphins dropped to 7–7.

==== Week 16: vs. Houston Texans ====
Quarter	1	2	3	4	Total
Texans	10	17	0	0	27
Dolphins	0	3	7	10	20

at Land Shark Stadium, Miami Gardens, Florida

- Game time: 1:00 pm EST
- Game weather: 75 °F (24 °C) (Sunny)
- Game attendance: 65,847
- Referee: Ron Winter
- TV announcers (CBS): Ian Eagle & Rich Gannon

With the loss, the Dolphins dropped to 7–8.

==== Week 17: vs. Pittsburgh Steelers ====
Quarter	1	2	3	4	Total
Steelers	14	3	7	6	30
Dolphins	7	3	0	14	24

at Land Shark Stadium, Miami Gardens, Florida

- Game time: 1:00 pm EST
- Game weather: 60 °F (16 °C) (Partly Cloudy)
- Game attendance: 70,102
- Referee: Bill Leavy
- TV announcers (CBS): Greg Gumbel & Dan Dierdorf

The final outcome of this game had somewhat of a domino effect. It resulted in the Dolphins' elimination from the post-season (including Super Bowl XLIV, which they hosted February 8, 2010), and also, by virtue of the final standings' tiebreaker (as the result of the Baltimore Ravens defeating the Oakland Raiders), the Steelers themselves being dethroned of their world title defense.

The Dolphins ended their season in 3rd place in the AFC East as they finished the season 7–9.

== Staff ==
Miami Dolphins 2009 staff
Front office: Chairman/managing general partner – Stephen Ross; CEO – Mike Dee; Vice chairman – Don Shula; Executive vice president of football operations – Bill Parcells; General manager – Jeff Ireland; Assistant director of player personnel – Brian Gaine; Director of college scouting – Chris Grier; Head coaches: Head coach – Tony Sparano; Assistant head coach/secondary – Todd Bowles; Offensive coaches: Offensive coordinator – Dan Henning; Quarterbacks – David Lee; Running backs – James Saxon; Wide receivers – Karl Dorrell; Tight ends – George DeLeone; Offensive line – Dave DeGuglielmo; Offensive quality control – Steve Bush	Defensive coaches: Defensive coordinator – Paul Pasqualoni; Defensive line – Kacy Rodgers; Outside linebackers – Jim Reid; Inside linebackers – George Edwards; Defensive quality control – David Corrao; Special teams coaches: Special teams coordinator – John Bonamego; Assistant special teams – Darren Rizzi; Strength and conditioning: Head strength and conditioning – Evan Marcus; Assistant strength and conditioning – David Puloka

== Final roster ==
2009 Miami Dolphins roster
Quarterbacks (QB): 7 Chad Henne; 16 Tyler Thigpen; 6 Pat White; Running backs (RB): 26 Lex Hilliard; 36 Lousaka Polite FB; 22 Kory Sheets; 34 Ricky Williams; Wide receivers (WR): 15 Davone Bess PR; 83 Greg Camarillo; 19 Ted Ginn Jr. KR/PR; 82 Brian Hartline; 84 Patrick Turner; Tight ends (TE): 80 Anthony Fasano; 81 Joey Haynos; 85 Kory Sperry	Offensive linemen (OL): 67 Joe Berger C/G; 72 Vernon Carey T; 63 Andrew Gardner T; 75 Nate Garner G/T; 64 Jake Grove C; 60 Andrew Hartline G; 77 Jake Long T; 65 Justin Smiley G; 66 Donald Thomas G; Defensive linemen (DL): 79 Ikaika Alama-Francis DE; 90 Ryan Baker NT; 71 Lionel Dotson DE; 70 Kendall Langford DE; 78 Tony McDaniel DE; 97 Phillip Merling DE; 96 Paul Soliai NT; 94 Randy Starks DE; 91 Cameron Wake DE	Linebackers (LB): 56 Charlie Anderson OLB; 51 Akin Ayodele ILB; 59 J. D. Folsom ILB; 93 Quentin Moses OLB; 55 Joey Porter OLB; 99 Jason Taylor OLB; 53 Reggie Torbor ILB; 50 Erik Walden OLB; Defensive backs (DB): 32 Jason Allen CB/S; 37 Yeremiah Bell SS; 30 Chris Clemons FS; 29 Tyrone Culver CB/S; 21 Vontae Davis CB; 33 Nate Jones CB/S; 41 Evan Oglesby CB; 24 Sean Smith CB; 28 Gibril Wilson FS; Special teams (ST): 5 Dan Carpenter K; 92 John Denney LS; 2 Brandon Fields P	Practice squad: 20 Tristan Davis RB; 69 Ray Feinga G; 89 Taurus Johnson WR; 86 John Nalbone TE; 31 Nate Ness S; 11 Julius Pruitt WR; Reserve: 25 Will Allen CB (IR); 23 Ronnie Brown RB (IR); 38 Patrick Cobbs RB/KR (IR); 52 Channing Crowder LB (IR); 95 Jason Ferguson NT (IR); 14 Brennan Marion WR (IR); 76 Lydon Murtha T (IR); 10 Chad Pennington QB (IR); Rookies in italics 53 active, 8 reserve, 6 practice squad
