= Charlie Anderson =

American football player (born 1981)

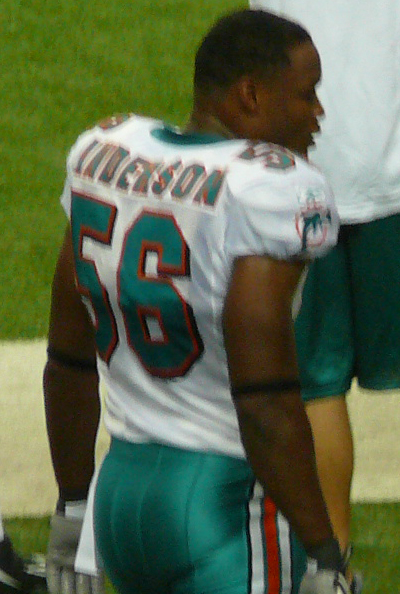
- Anderson with the Dolphins in 2009

No. 50, 56, 52
- Position: Linebacker

Personal information
- Born: December 8, 1981 (age 44); Jackson, Mississippi, U.S.
- Listed height: 6 ft 4 in (1.93 m)
- Listed weight: 250 lb (113 kg)

Career information
- High school: Provine (Jackson)
- College: Ole Miss
- NFL draft: 2004: 6th round, 200th overall pick

Career history
- Houston Texans (2004–2007); Miami Dolphins (2008–2009); Kansas City Chiefs (2010)

Career NFL statistics
- Total tackles: 123
- Sacks: 7.5
- Forced fumbles: 4
- Fumble recoveries: 4
- Defensive touchdowns: 1
- Stats at Pro Football Reference

Charlie Alexander Anderson (born December 8, 1981) is an American former professional football player who was a linebacker in the National Football League (NFL). He was selected by the Houston Texans in the sixth round of the 2004 NFL draft. He played college football for the Ole Miss Rebels.

== Early life ==
Anderson attended and played high school football at Provine High School in Jackson, Mississippi. As a senior tight end and defensive end, his team made it to the 5-A state finals. He also lettered in track and soccer.

== College career ==
Anderson was a four-year letterman at the University of Mississippi. During his senior season as defensive end in 2003, he recorded 54 tackles, 5.5 sacks and two forced fumbles. He finished his collegiate career having played in 48 games and racking up 127 tackles, 12.5 sacks, three forced fumbles and five passes defensed.

== Professional career ==
=== Houston Texans ===
Anderson was selected by the Houston Texans in the sixth round (200th overall) of the 2004 NFL draft. On July 27, he signed a three-year contract worth $970,000.

During his rookie season in 2004, Anderson appeared in 15 games as a reserve. His 13 special teams tackles ranked third on the team, and he also contributed a tackle on defense. In a December 19 contest against the Chicago Bears, Anderson recovered a Chad Hutchinson fumbled forced by Dunta Robinson and returned it 60 yards for a touchdown.

In 2005, Anderson was viewed by the Texans' as their third outside linebacker behind starters Antwan Peek and Jason Babin. Despite battling a hip injury late in the season, he appeared in all 16 games as a reserve. He surpassed his previous season's total with 14 special teams tackles, ranking him second on the team. He recorded his first career sack against the Seattle Seahawks on October 16, taking down Matt Hasselbeck for a 19-yard loss. Against the Arizona Cardinals on December 18, he recovered a Reggie Swinton fumble on special teams. Anderson finished the season with nine tackles, a sack and a pass defensed on defense.

Anderson suffered a knee injury during practice in May 2006 and was sidelined until training camp. After battling Shantee Orr for the starting strongside linebacker job, Anderson appeared in 13 games in a reserve role. He finished the season with five tackles on defense while adding 11 tackles on special teams - a total which ranked him second on the team for the second straight season.

During his final season with the Texans in 2007, Anderson appeared in all 16 games and made the first five starts of his career in place of an injured Danny Clark. He recorded a career-high 24 tackles, two sacks and as pass defensed on the season. Both of his sacks came against Jacksonville Jaguars quarterback Quinn Gray in a 42-28 Texans win on December 30.

=== Miami Dolphins ===
An unrestricted free agent in the 2008 offseason, the Miami Dolphins signed Anderson to a three-year contract on March 2. It was reported that team vice president Bill Parcells and general manager Jeff Ireland liked Anderson because of his speed and athleticism, especially on special teams. Despite having started only five games in four seasons with the Texans, he was told by Dolphins management he would have an opportunity to compete for a starting job. In the last game of the season, he blocked a punt against the Jets, the Dolphins went on to win the game, 24–17, and head to the playoffs.

=== Kansas City Chiefs ===
He played the 2010 season with the Kansas City Chiefs. He was not re-signed following the season and was declared a free agent on July 25, 2011.

=== Statistics ===
Year	Team	G	GS	Total Tkl	Solo Tkl	Ast Tkl	Sacks	PDef	FF	FR	SFTY
2004	HOU	15	0	13	9	4	0.0	0	0	1	0
2005	HOU	16	0	18	14	4	1.0	2	0	1	0
2006	HOU	13	0	16	13	3	0.0	1	0	0	0
2007	HOU	16	5	31	19	12	2.0	1	0	1	0
2008	MIA	16	1	28	21	7	2.5	0	2	1	1
2009	MIA	16	1	17	15	2	2.0	0	2	0	0
2010	KC	2	0	0	0	0	0	0	0	0	0
Total		94	7	123	91	32	7.5	4	4	4	1

== Personal life ==
Anderson majored in sociology with a minor in criminal justice at the University of Mississippi and earned his degree during the 2007 offseason. He has five children- Devin, Kylin, Jaiden, Christian, and Ethan. His wife is Victoria Anderson.
