= Kendall Langford =

American football player (born 1986)

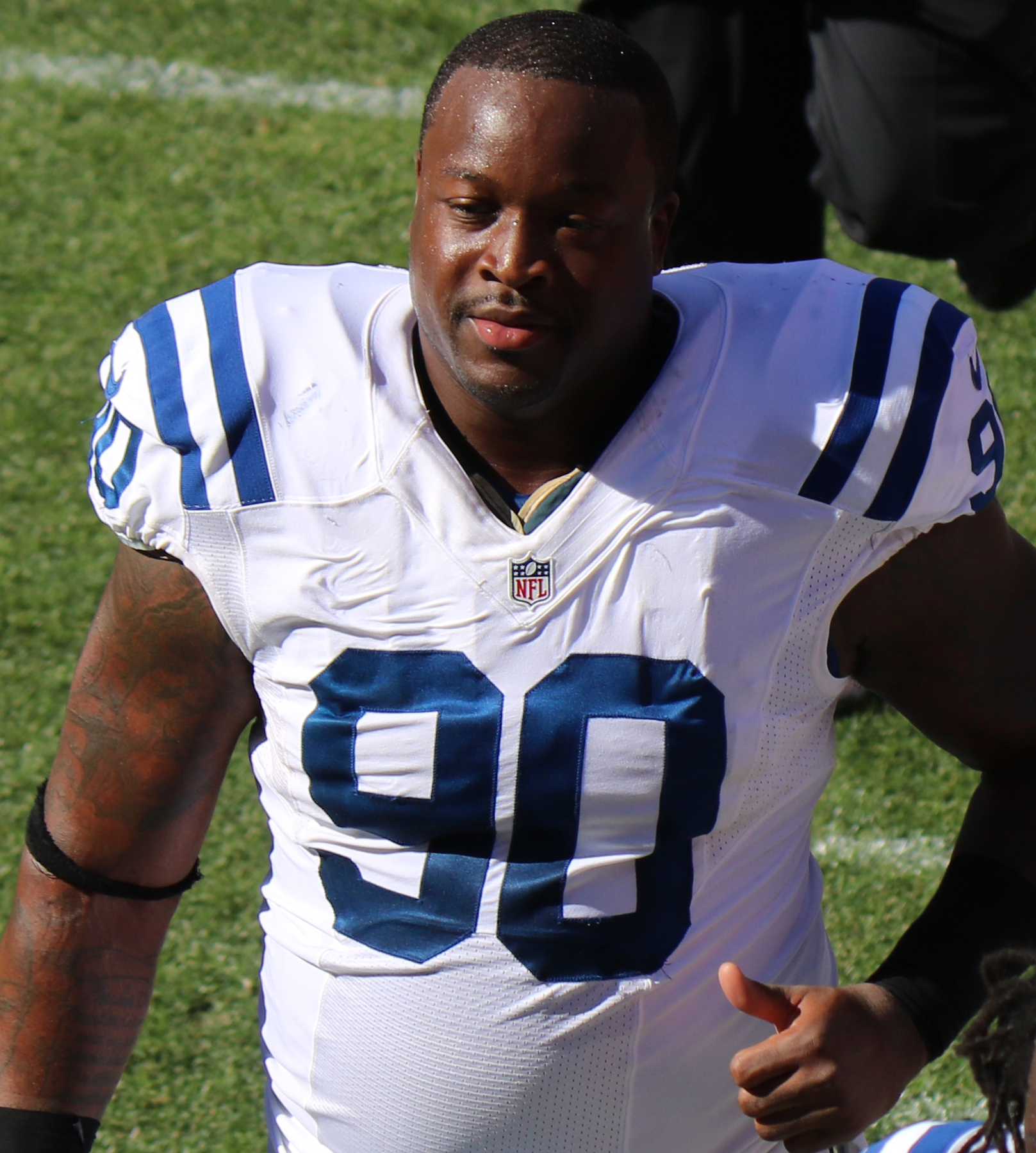
- Langford with the Indianapolis Colts in 2016

No. 70, 98, 90, 96
- Position: Defensive end

Personal information
- Born: January 27, 1986 (age 40); Petersburg, Virginia, U.S.
- Listed height: 6 ft 6 in (1.98 m)
- Listed weight: 305 lb (138 kg)

Career information
- High school: Petersburg
- College: Hampton (2004–2007)
- NFL draft: 2008: 3rd round, 66th overall pick

Career history
- Miami Dolphins (2008–2011); St. Louis Rams (2012–2014); Indianapolis Colts (2015–2016); New Orleans Saints (2017); Houston Texans (2017); Miami Dolphins (2018)*
- * Offseason or practice squad member only

Awards and highlights
- PFWA All-Rookie Team (2008); 3× First-team All-MEAC (2005–2007)

Career NFL statistics
- Total tackles: 290
- Sacks: 22.5
- Forced fumbles: 4
- Fumble recoveries: 1
- Stats at Pro Football Reference

Kendall Arkel Langford (born January 27, 1986) is an American former professional football player who was a defensive end in the National Football League (NFL). He played college football for the Hampton Pirates, and was selected by the Miami Dolphins in the third round of the 2008 NFL draft. He also played for the St. Louis Rams, Indianapolis Colts, New Orleans Saints, and Houston Texans.

== Early life ==
Langford attended and played high school football at Petersburg (Va.) High School. He was earned First-team All-District honors as a junior in 2002, as well as First-team All-District, Second-team All-Metro, and Second-team All-Region honors as a senior.

== College career ==
After high school, Langford attended and played college football at Hampton University, where he was a four-year letterman from 2004 to 2007. He was also recruited by Virginia, Virginia Tech, Morgan State as well as other Division I-AA schools.

In 12 games (three starts) for the Pirates as a freshman in 2004, Langford earned Freshman all-American honors after recording 44 tackles (15 solo), 11.5 tackles for a loss, 4.5 sacks, seven quarterback pressures, two forced fumbles and a fumble recovery. In a game against South Carolina State, he recovered a fumble and returned it 30 yards for a touchdown.

As a sophomore in 2005, Langford started all 12 games for the Pirates at left defensive end. On the season he recorded 65 tackles (31 solo), 15.5 tackles for a loss, 4.5 sacks, 12 quarterback pressures, three forced fumbles, two blocked kicks and two passes defensed. For his efforts, Langford earned first-team All-MEAC honors. He earned MEAC Defensive Player of the Week honors in a game against Delaware State after racking up nine tackles (four solo), five tackles for a loss and three sacks.

Langford earned first-team All-MEAC honors for the second consecutive season as a junior in 2005. He started all 12 games for the Pirates at left defensive end, recording 55 tackles (32 solo), 16 tackles for a loss, 8.5 sacks, eight quarterback pressures, two forced fumbles, a blocked kick and a pass defensed. His tackle total led the Pirates' defensive lineman, while his sack total ranked third in the MEAC.

During his senior season at Hampton in 2007, Langford led the team with 72 tackles (32 solo) on his way to his third straight first-team All-MEAC selection. He also recorded 13.5 tackles for a loss, six sacks, 12 quarterback pressures, two forced fumbles, a blocked kick and a pass defensed. In a game against North Carolina A&T, Langford intercepted a Shelton Morgan pass and returned it 22 yards for his second career touchdown. Following his senior season, he appeared in the East-West Shrine Game and 2008 Senior Bowl.

After playing in 47 games for Hampton, Langford finished his collegiate career with 236 tackles (110 solo), 56.5 tackles for a loss, 23.5 sacks, 39 quarterback pressures, nine force fumbles, a fumble recovery, five pass deflections, an interception, five blocked kicks and two touchdowns.

== Professional career ==
=== Pre-draft ===
Coming out of Hampton, Langford was projected by the majority of NFL draft experts and analysts to be a third or fourth round pick. He received an invitation to the NFL combine and completed all of the required combine drills. Langford had private workouts with the Detroit Lions, Miami Dolphins, Minnesota Vikings, Pittsburgh Steelers, and St. Louis Rams. He was ranked as the 11th best defensive end prospect in the draft by NFLDraftScout.com.

Pre-draft measurables
Height	Weight	40-yard dash	10-yard split	20-yard split	20-yard shuttle	Three-cone drill	Vertical jump	Broad jump	Bench press
6 ft 6 in (1.98 m)	295 lb (134 kg)	4.95 s	1.59 s	2.84 s	4.69 s	7.72 s	27 in (0.69 m)	9 ft 6 in (2.90 m)	24 reps
All values from NFL Combine

=== Miami Dolphins (first stint) ===
"I think I am a power player. I get after the ball. I chase the ball. I believe I make plays."

— Kendall Langford, April 2008

Langford was selected by the Miami Dolphins in the third round (66th overall) of the 2008 NFL draft. He was the second of three defensive lineman taken by the Dolphins in the 2008 Draft, following Phillip Merling and preceding Lionel Dotson. He was projected as a defensive end in the Dolphins' 3–4 defense. Negotiations between the Dolphins and Langford's agent took place in June and lasted until he was signed to a multi-year deal on July 11.

=== St. Louis Rams ===
Langford signed with the St. Louis Rams on March 17, 2012. He was released by the team on February 26, 2015.

=== Indianapolis Colts ===
Langford signed with the Indianapolis Colts on March 10, 2015. On November 19, 2016, Langford was placed on injured reserve.

On August 9, 2017, Langford was released by the Colts after failing his physical.

=== New Orleans Saints ===
On September 21, 2017, Langford signed with the New Orleans Saints. He was released on October 4, 2017.

=== Houston Texans ===
On October 10, 2017, Langford signed with the Houston Texans. He was released on November 7, 2017.

=== Miami Dolphins (second stint) ===
On August 14, 2018, Langford signed with the Miami Dolphins. He was released on September 1, 2018.

== Career statistics ==
=== NFL ===
==== Regular season ====
Season	Team	Games		Tackles						Interceptions					Fumbles
Season	Team	GP	GS	Comb	Total	Ast	Sck	SFTY	PDef	Int	Yds	Avg	Lng	TDs	FF
2008	Miami Dolphins	16	13	31	25	6	2.0	–	3	–	–	–	–	–	0
2009	Miami Dolphins	16	13	43	33	10	2.5	–	1	–	–	–	–	–	1
2010	Miami Dolphins	16	16	47	33	14	3.0	–	4	–	–	–	–	–	2
2011	Miami Dolphins	16	12	20	15	5	0.0	–	1	–	–	–	–	–	1
2012	St. Louis Rams	16	16	27	18	9	2.0	–	2	–	–	–	–	–	0
2013	St. Louis Rams	16	16	49	36	13	5.0	–	4	–	–	–	–	–	0
2014	St. Louis Rams	16	4	25	17	8	1.0	–	0	–	–	–	–	–	0
2015	Indianapolis Colts	16	16	38	23	15	7.0	–	3	–	–	–	–	–	0
2016	Indianapolis Colts	7	7	10	8	2	0.0	–	2	–	–	–	–	–	0
	Total	135	113	290	208	82	22.5	–	20	–	–	–	–	–	4

==== Postseason ====
Season	Team	Games		Tackles						Interceptions					Fumbles
Season	Team	GP	GS	Comb	Total	Ast	Sck	SFTY	PDef	Int	Yds	Avg	Lng	TDs	FF
2008	Miami Dolphins	1	1	2	2	0	0.0	–	0	–	–	–	–	–	0
	Total	1	1	2	2	0	0.0	–	0	–	–	–	–	–	0

=== College ===
		Tackles									
Year	G	Total	Solo	Ast	TFL	Sck	FF	FR	INT	PD	TD
2004	12	44	15	29	11.5	4.5	2	1	0	1	1
2005	12	65	31	34	15.5	4.5	3	0	0	2	0
2006	12	55	32	23	16	8.5	2	0	0	1	0
2007	11	72	32	40	13.5	6	2	0	1	1	1
Total	47	236	110	126	56.5	23.5	9	1	1	5	2
