= Lionel Dotson =

American football player (born 1985)

No. 71, 95, 97
- Position: Defensive tackle

Personal information
- Born: February 11, 1985 (age 41); Houston, Texas, U.S.
- Listed height: 6 ft 4 in (1.93 m)
- Listed weight: 289 lb (131 kg)

Career information
- High school: Dobie (Houston)
- College: Arizona
- NFL draft: 2008: 7th round, 245th overall pick

Career history
- Miami Dolphins (2008–2009); Denver Broncos (2010)*; Miami Dolphins (2010); Buffalo Bills (2011)
- * Offseason or practice squad member only

Awards and highlights
- Second-team All-Pac-10 (2007)

Career NFL statistics
- Total tackles: 7
- Stats at Pro Football Reference

Lionel Eugene Dotson, Jr. (born February 11, 1985) is an American former professional football player who was a defensive tackle in the National Football League (NFL). He played college football for the Arizona Wildcats and was selected by the Miami Dolphins in the seventh round of the 2008 NFL draft.

Dotson was also a member of the Denver Broncos and Buffalo Bills.

== Early life ==
Dotson attended and played high school football at Dobie High School in Pasadena, Texas. He was a two-time letterman in both football and basketball. During his senior season, he recorded 50 tackles and 13 sacks on his way to a nomination for the U.S. Army All-American Bowl. In basketball, he earned first-team all-district honors as a junior and was selected to the Texas High School Coaches All-Star game as a senior.

== College career ==
After graduating from Dobie High School, Dotson played college football for the University of Arizona. As a true freshman in 2003, he was redshirted and was a member of the defensive scout team.

Dotson saw action in seven games including six starts as a redshirt freshman in 2004. He finished the season with 19 tackles (12 solo), 3.5 tackles for a loss and three sacks. Against rival Arizona State, he recorded five tackles, 1.5 tackles for a loss and a sack.

As a sophomore in 2005, Dotson started four of the 10 games in which he played for the Wildcats. On the year he recorded 21 tackles (10 solo), a forced fumble and a fumble recovery. He set a season-high and tied a career-high with five tackles in a game against Washington.

Dotson played in 11 games for the Wildcats in 2006, starting 10 of them. He earned honorable mention All-Pac-10 honors as a junior with 31 tackles (15 solo), two tackles for a loss, a sack and a forced fumble.

He experienced his most productive season as a senior in 2007, recording 50 tackles (36 solo), nine tackles for a loss, a team-high 6.5 sacks a forced fumble and a pass defensed. For his efforts, Dotson earned second-team All-Pac-10 honors.

During his four-year collegiate career at Arizona, Dotson started 32 of the 40 games in which he played and racked up 121 tackles (73 solo), 14.5 tackles for a loss, 10.5 sacks, three forced fumbles, a fumble recovery and four passes defensed.

=== Statistics ===
Career Statistics
			Tackles									
Year	GP	GS	Total	Solo	Ast	TFL	Sck	FF	FR	INT	PD	TD
2003	Redshirted											
2004	7	6	19	12	7	3.5	3	0	0	0	0	0
2005	10	4	21	10	11	0	0	1	1	0	3	0
2006	11	10	31	15	16	2	1	1	0	0	0	0
2007	12	12	50	36	14	9	6.5	1	0	0	1	0
Total	40	32	121	73	48	14.5	10.5	3	1	0	4	0

== Professional career ==
=== Miami Dolphins (first stint) ===
"He really came on this year at Arizona and we really feel good about his upside as well."

— Jeff Ireland, Dolphins general manager

Dotson was selected by the Miami Dolphins in the seventh round (245th overall) of the 2008 NFL draft. Dotson reported that the Dolphins had been calling him throughout the second day of the draft, though he had also been contacted by the Arizona Cardinals, Atlanta Falcons and New York Giants. He was the third and final defensive lineman taken by the Dolphins in the draft, following Phillip Merling and Kendall Langford. On May 19, the Dolphins signed Dotson to a multi-year contract.

Dotson was waived on September 4, 2010.

=== Denver Broncos ===
Dotson was signed to the Denver Broncos' practice squad on September 5.

=== Miami Dolphins (second stint) ===
Dotson was signed off of the Broncos' practice squad by the Dolphins on September 14.

=== Buffalo Bills ===
On July 31, 2011, Dotson signed with the Buffalo Bills. He was waived on July 25, 2012.

== Personal ==
Dotson's uncle, Vance Bedford, is currently serves as defensive coordinator at the University of Louisville and played for the NFL's St. Louis Cardinals in 1982.
