= Brandon Fields =

Brandon Fields may refer to:

- Brandon Fields (American football)
- Brandon Fields (musician)
