= List of Monmouth Hawks in the NFL draft =

This is a list of Monmouth Hawks players in the NFL draft.

== Key ==
B	Back	K	Kicker	NT	Nose tackle
C	Center	LB	Linebacker	FB	Fullback
DB	Defensive back	P	Punter	HB	Halfback
DE	Defensive end	QB	Quarterback	WR	Wide receiver
DT	Defensive tackle	RB	Running back	G	Guard
E	End	T	Offensive tackle	TE	Tight end

= Pro Bowler
= Hall of Famer

== Selections ==
Year	Round	Pick	Player	Team	Position
1958	22	261	Bob McKee	Baltimore Colts	E
1974	16	401	Jim Smith	Philadelphia Eagles	LB
2009	5	161	John Nalbone	Miami Dolphins	TE
2015	7	220	Neal Sterling	Jacksonville Jaguars	WR
