= Paul Soliai =

American football player (born 1983)

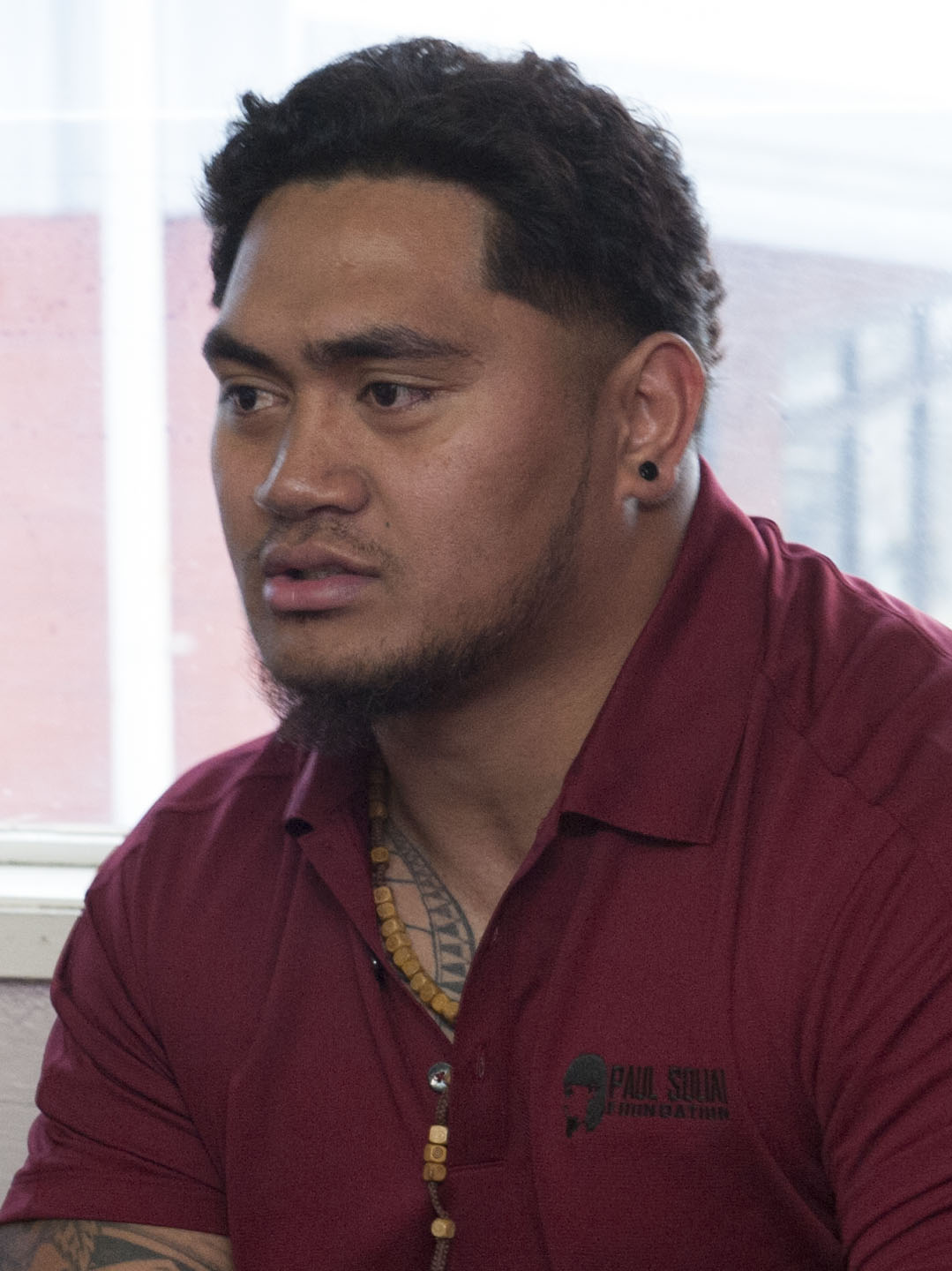
- Soliai in 2014

No. 96, 90
- Position: Defensive tackle

Personal information
- Born: December 30, 1983 (age 42); Santa Ana, California, U.S.
- Listed height: 6 ft 4 in (1.93 m)
- Listed weight: 345 lb (156 kg)

Career information
- High school: Nuuuli Poly Tech (Pago Pago, American Samoa)
- College: Coffeyville (2002–2003); Utah (2004–2006)
- NFL draft: 2007: 4th round, 108th overall pick

Career history
- Miami Dolphins (2007–2013); Atlanta Falcons (2014–2015); Carolina Panthers (2016)

Awards and highlights
- Pro Bowl (2011); Second-team All-MW (2006)

Career NFL statistics
- Total tackles: 221
- Sacks: 5.5
- Forced fumbles: 2
- Fumble recoveries: 4
- Stats at Pro Football Reference

Paul Fuapapa Soliai (born December 30, 1983) is an American former professional football player who was a defensive tackle in the National Football League (NFL). He played college football for the Utah Utes. He was selected by the Miami Dolphins in the fourth round of the 2007 NFL draft. He also played for the Atlanta Falcons and the Carolina Panthers.

== Early life ==
Soliai, of Samoan descent, attended Rancho Alamitos High School in Garden Grove, California, before moving to American Samoa for his senior year, where he attended Nu'uuli Technical High School in Pago Pago and was the team captain.

== College career ==
=== Junior college ===
Soliai spend two seasons at Coffeyville Community College in Coffeyville, Kansas. He was a two-time All-Kansas Jayhawk Community College Conference offensive lineman. He earned an honorable mention All-American selection in 2002, and was a First-team junior college All-American as a sophomore in 2003.

Considered a four-star recruit out of junior college by Rivals.com, Soliai was listed as the No. 32 non-high school player in the nation.

=== Utah ===
Soliai transferred to the University of Utah in 2004 and was redshirted his first season with the Utes. He played in 12 games as a junior in 2005, with up five tackles, 1.5 of which were for a loss. He made four stops against rival Utah State, including an assisted tackle for a loss. He also had a 10-yard sack against Arizona.

In 12 games at nose guard as a senior in 2006, Soliai recorded 35 tackles (13 solo), 3.5 tackles for a loss, two sacks for 15 yards, four pass break-ups, a forced fumble, a fumble recovery and a blocked kick. He earned a Second-team All-Mountain West Conference selection.

== Professional career ==
=== Pre-draft ===
In April 2007, Soliai measured a height of 6-feet-4 and a weight of 332 pounds at his Utah Pro Day. He ran the 40-yard dash in 5.02 seconds and 5.12 seconds, the short shuttle in 4.53 seconds and the three-cone drill in 7.77 seconds. He measured a 30½-inch vertical jump, but an elbow sprain prevented him from doing the 225-pound bench press.

Prior to the draft, Soliai was praised for his rare size, strength, quickness and athleticism, while also being criticized for his lack of technique and moves.

Pre-draft measurables
Height	Weight	40-yard dash	10-yard split	20-yard split	20-yard shuttle	Three-cone drill	Vertical jump	Broad jump	Wonderlic
6 ft 4 in (1.93 m)	344 lb (156 kg)	5.02 s	1.63 s	2.86 s	4.53 s	7.66 s	30 1/2 in (0.77 m)	9 ft 7 in (2.92 m)	9
All values from NFL Combine, except for 40-yd dash (and splits), 20-ss, and vertical, which are from Utah Pro Day

=== Miami Dolphins ===
Soliai was selected by the Miami Dolphins in the fourth round (108th overall) of the 2007 NFL draft, signing a four-year contract on June 7.

Before the NFL lockout, Soliai was franchise tagged by the Dolphins. They gave him a one-year guaranteed salary of at least $12 million, which was the average of the top 5 salaries at that position. This was made bloated by Albert Haynesworth's record-breaking $100 million contract from the Redskins.

On January 24, 2012, Soliai was added to the AFC Pro Bowl Roster to replace Ravens defensive tackle Haloti Ngata.

On March 14, 2012, Soliai signed a 2-year extension with Miami worth $12 million, with $6 million guaranteed for the 2012 and 2013 seasons.

=== Atlanta Falcons ===
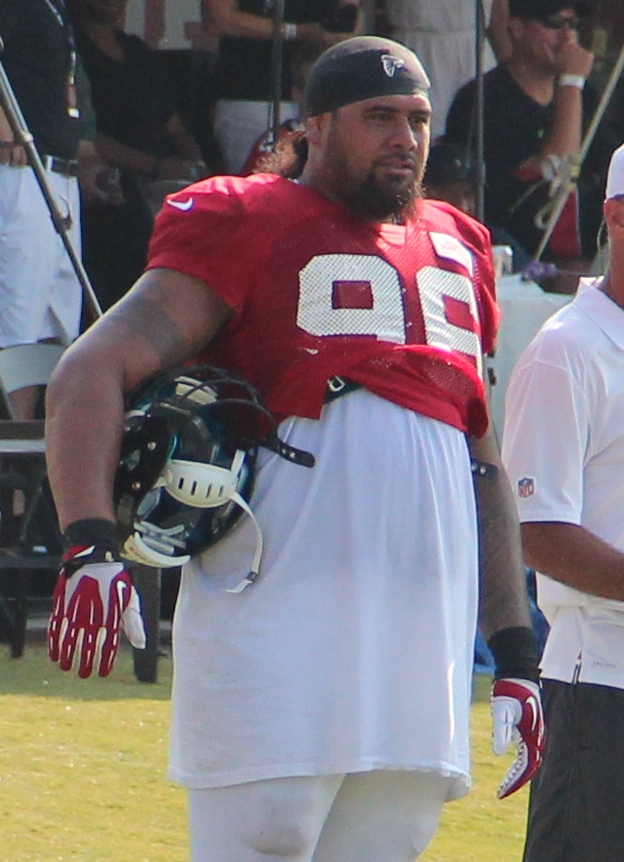
Soliai with the Atlanta Falcons in 2014

On March 11, 2014, Soliai agreed to terms with the Atlanta Falcons on a five-year, $33 million contract including $14 million guaranteed. In a week 8 game against the Detroit Lions at Wembley Stadium in London, Soliai was called for a holding penalty against Lions center Dominic Raiola. This penalty set up kicker Matt Prater for a game-winning 47 yard field goal, which he made, handing the Falcons a 22–21 loss and dropping them to a 2–5 record. On December 29, 2015 Soliai was placed on injured reserve ending his season.

On March 9, 2016, the Atlanta Falcons cut Soliai.

=== Carolina Panthers ===
Soliai signed with the Carolina Panthers on March 14, 2016.

On February 21, 2017, Soliai was released by the Panthers.

=== Retirement ===
On April 19, 2018, Soliai signed a one-day contract to retire as a member of the Dolphins.

== NFL career statistics ==
Legend
**Bold**	Career high

=== Regular season ===
Year	Team	Games		Tackles					Interceptions					Fumbles			
Year	Team	GP	GS	Cmb	Solo	Ast	Sck	TFL	Int	Yds	TD	Lng	PD	FF	FR	Yds	TD
2007	MIA	8	0	4	4	0	0.0	0	0	0	0	0	0	0	0	0	0
2008	MIA	14	0	3	3	0	0.0	0	0	0	0	0	0	0	0	0	0
2009	MIA	14	5	25	22	3	0.0	2	0	0	0	0	1	**1**	0	0	0
2010	MIA	**16**	14	**39**	**33**	6	**2.0**	**8**	0	0	0	0	2	0	**1**	0	0
2011	MIA	**16**	12	27	19	8	0.0	3	0	0	0	0	2	0	0	0	0
2012	MIA	**16**	**16**	29	18	11	1.5	**8**	0	0	0	0	2	0	**1**	0	0
2013	MIA	15	15	34	19	**15**	1.0	4	0	0	0	0	**5**	**1**	0	0	0
2014	ATL	15	14	30	20	10	1.0	6	0	0	0	0	0	0	0	0	0
2015	ATL	14	10	22	17	5	0.0	3	0	0	0	0	0	0	**1**	0	0
2016	CAR	10	1	8	4	4	0.0	1	0	0	0	0	0	0	**1**	0	0
		138	87	221	159	62	5.5	35	0	0	0	0	12	2	4	0	0

=== Playoffs ===
Year	Team	Games		Tackles					Interceptions					Fumbles			
Year	Team	GP	GS	Cmb	Solo	Ast	Sck	TFL	Int	Yds	TD	Lng	PD	FF	FR	Yds	TD
2008	MIA	**1**	0	**1**	**1**	0	0.0	**1**	0	0	0	0	0	**1**	0	0	0
		1	0	1	1	0	0.0	1	0	0	0	0	0	1	0	0	0
