= James Robinson (wide receiver) =

American football player (born 1982)

No. 15
- Position: Wide receiver

Personal information
- Born: December 6, 1982 (age 43); Fort Lauderdale, Florida, U.S.
- Listed height: 6 ft 3 in (1.91 m)
- Listed weight: 200 lb (91 kg)

Career information
- College: Butler C.C.

Career history
- Miami Morays / Florida Frenzy (2005–2006); Las Vegas Gladiators (2007)*; South Georgia Wildcats (2007); Toronto Argonauts (2007)*; Kansas City Brigade (2008); Toronto Argonauts (2008–2009); Miami Dolphins (2009)*; Cleveland Browns (2009)*; Washington Redskins (2009–2010)*; Cleveland Browns (2010)*; Toronto Argonauts (2010); Saskatchewan Roughriders (2011); Chicago Slaughter (2011); Pittsburgh Power (2013)
- * Offseason or practice squad member only

Career CFL statistics
- Receptions: 30
- Receiving yards: 437
- Receiving TDs: 1
- Stats at CFL.ca (archived)

Career AFL statistics
- Receptions: 10
- Receiving yards: 138
- Receiving TDs: 5
- Stats at ArenaFan.com

James Robinson (born December 6, 1982) is an American former professional football wide receiver. He was signed by the Miami Morays of the National Indoor Football League as a street free agent in 2005. He played college football at Butler Community College.

Robinson was also a member of the Florida Frenzy, Las Vegas Gladiators, South Georgia Wildcats, Toronto Argonauts, Kansas City Brigade, Miami Dolphins, Cleveland Browns, Washington Redskins, Saskatchewan Roughriders, Chicago Slaughter, and Pittsburgh Power.

== Professional career ==
=== Florida Frenzy ===
After finishing his collegiate career at Butler Community College, Robinson signed with the Florida Frenzy of the National Indoor Football League in 2005. He appeared in every game for the Frenzy through the 2006 season.

=== Las Vegas Gladiators ===
Robinson attended training camp with the Las Vegas Gladiators of the Arena Football League (AFL) in 2007 before being released on March 20.

=== South Georgia Wildcats ===
Robinson signed with af2's South Georgia Wildcats for the 2007 season and caught 77 passes for 1,168 yards and 27 touchdowns his rookie season.

=== Toronto Argonauts (first stint) ===
On September 23, 2007, Robinson signed a practice roster agreement with the Toronto Argonauts of the Canadian Football League (CFL), remaining there for the duration of the season.

=== Kansas City Brigade ===
Robinson signed with the Kansas City Brigade of the AFL in 2008, catching two passes for 11 yards and a touchdown while also adding three tackles.

=== Toronto Argonauts (second stint) ===
In 2008, Robinson played in 13 games for the Argonauts, catching 25 receptions for 381 yards and 1 touchdown. His best performance came in week 4 of the 2008 Toronto Argonauts season when he hauled in 10 catches for 194 yards including scoring a 90-yard touchdown. He was released by the team on August 5, 2009, after the Argonauts re-signed P. K. Sam.

=== Miami Dolphins ===
Robinson was signed by the Miami Dolphins on August 10, 2009. He was waived by the Dolphins during final cuts on September 5, but re-signed to the team's practice squad the following day. He was released from the practice squad on November 4.

=== Cleveland Browns (first stint) ===
Robinson was signed to the Cleveland Browns' practice squad on November 19, 2009. He was released on December 1.

=== Washington Redskins ===
Robinson was signed to the Washington Redskins' practice squad on December 9. After his contract expired following the season, Robinson was re-signed to a future contract on January 5, 2010.

He was waived on May 3, 2010.

=== Cleveland Browns (second stint) ===
Robinson signed with the Browns on June 3, 2010. He was released on June 17, 2010.

=== Toronto Argonauts (third stint) ===
On June 25, 2010, it was announced that Robinson had rejoined the team and had agreed to a practice roster spot. He was released by the team on June 24, 2011.

=== Saskatchewan Roughriders ===
On July 12, 2011, Robinson signed with the Saskatchewan Roughriders of the CFL. After one season with the team, he was released on February 10, 2012.

=== Pittsburgh Power ===
Robinson was signed by the AFL's Pittsburgh Power on November 8, 2012. However, due to injuries, he did not make his debut with the team until May 11, 2013. In that game against the Philadelphia Soul, he made 6 catches for 84 yards and 4 touchdowns, resulting in him being named the J. Lewis Small Playmaker of the Game.
