= Salmon High School =

Salmon Jr/Sr High School

Location
- 401 S. Warpath Drive; Salmon, Idaho 83467; United States; 45°10′13″N 113°53′07″W

Information
- Type: Public high school
- Established: 1980; 46 years ago
- School district: Salmon School District #291
- Superintendent: Jill Patton
- Principal: Russ Bradshaw
- Teaching staff: 23.44 (FTE) (2023-2024)
- Grades: 6–12
- Enrollment: 383 (2023-2024)
- Student to teacher ratio: 16.34
- Colors: Orange, Black, and White
- Athletics conference: IHSAA Division 3A
- Mascot: Savages
- Website: sjshs.salmon291.org

Salmon Jr/Sr High School is a public high school located in Salmon, Idaho. Salmon High School is a part of the Salmon School District #291.

== Extracurricular activities ==
Extracurricular activities offered by the school include FFA, Travel Club, Natural Helpers, National Honor Society, Robotics, student council, pep band, and Key club. School-supported programs include wrestling, football, basketball, cross-country, track & field, baseball, softball, golf, volleyball, cheer, ice hockey, and rodeo.

The Nep & Mary Ellen Lynch Center, known locally as The Lynch Center, opened in May 2021. This $5 million facility is the primary gym at Salmon High School for basketball, volleyball, and wrestling.

== Graduation requirements ==
In order to receive a diploma from Salmon High School, students must maintain a "C" average (a 2.0 GPA) in core subjects. The number of credits required varies between graduation years, currently ranging from 46 to 50. In addition, students who entered 9th grade on or after the Fall of 2009 must take either the ACT, SAT, or COMPASS college placement test. The same group of students must complete a senior project.

== Mascot lawsuit ==
In 1999, the Salmon School Board was threatened by the National Coalition on Racism in Sports and the Media with a $100,000 lawsuit if they did not change the schools mascot, the Savages. Members of the coalition stated that Native American mascots were derogatory especially since the name was Savages. The school board ultimately chose to get rid of the logo featuring a Native American head but retained the Savages name. The current logo is a nod to grizzly bears in the nearby Salmon-Challis National Forest.

== Notable alumni ==
- J. D. Folsom, American football player
