= Jy Bond =

Australian gridiron football player (born 1979)

No. 6
- Position: Punter

Personal information
- Born: 22 April 1979 (age 47); Melbourne, Australia
- Listed height: 6 ft 3 in (1.91 m)
- Listed weight: 222 lb (101 kg)

Career history
- Miami Dolphins (2009)*; New York Giants (2010)*; Hartford Colonials (2010)
- * Offseason or practice squad member only

Jy Bond (born 22 April 1979) is an American former football punter. He was signed by the Miami Dolphins as a street free agent in 2009.

Bond was also a member of the New York Giants and Hartford Colonials.

== Australian football career ==
The son of former Australian rules football player Graeme Bond, Jy Bond followed his father to Richmond under the father/son rule but did not play senior football with the team.

== American football career ==
Bond began training to be a punter in the NFL after a holiday in the USA in 2005. Jy worked with Sav Rocca (another ex AFL player with the Philadelphia Eagles) and his agent to move into the NFL. He signed with the Miami Dolphins of the NFL in March 2009. Jy was offered a college scholarship a number of years previous while visiting his brother who was on a baseball scholarship in the USA. For personal reasons he was unable to accept the offer.

Since 2009, Jy was coached and mentored by Darren Bennett. Bond also worked with fellow Aussie NFL player Sav Rocca.

Jy also played for the Western Crusaders, an American football team located in Melbourne, Australia. He is a member of their team of the century.

=== Miami Dolphins ===
Bond signed a two-year contract with the Miami Dolphins on 3 March 2009. He competed with incumbent Brandon Fields for the Dolphins' punting job in training camp, but was released.

=== New York Giants ===
Bond signed with the New York Giants on 18 March 2010.

Bond returned to the Giants for their mini camp in May 2012. In 2012, NFL teams–New York Jets, Carolina Panthers and Chicago Bears expressed interest in Bond as a Punter. In 2013 Bond worked out with the Jets and also Tampa Bay before returning to Giants.

Jy is now involved in the media and also runs a feeder program to the NCAA and NFL with former NFL player Ben Graham and Darren Bennett. They later worked with ex-Carlton player, Brendan Fevola.

Bond now works in talent management for his native Australian rules football.
