= Patrick Turner =

American football player (born 1987)

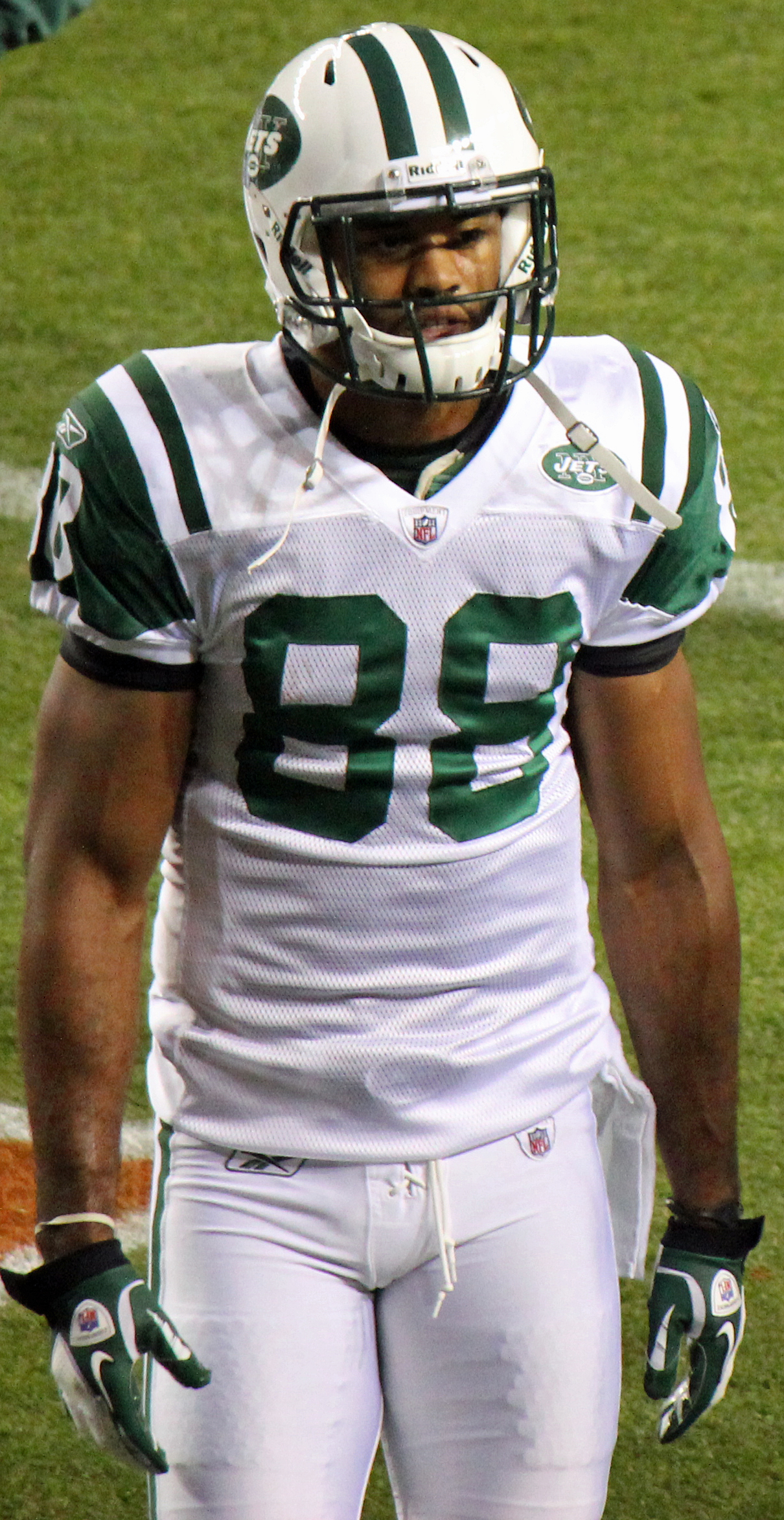
- Turner during the 2011 NFL season

No. 84, 88
- Position: Wide receiver

Personal information
- Born: May 19, 1987 (age 39); Nashville, Tennessee, U.S.
- Listed height: 6 ft 5 in (1.96 m)
- Listed weight: 220 lb (100 kg)

Career information
- High school: Goodpasture Christian School (Madison, Tennessee)
- College: USC
- NFL draft: 2009: 3rd round, 87th overall pick

Career history
- Miami Dolphins (2009); New York Jets (2010–2012)

Awards and highlights
- Second-team All-Pac-10 (2008)

Career NFL statistics
- Receptions: 10
- Receiving yards: 122
- Receiving average: 12.2
- Receiving touchdowns: 1
- Stats at Pro Football Reference

Patrick Steven Turner (born May 19, 1987) is an American former professional football player who was a wide receiver in the National Football League (NFL). He was selected by the Miami Dolphins in the third round of the 2009 NFL draft. He played college football for the USC Trojans. He was also a member of the New York Jets.

== Early life ==
Turner prepped at Goodpasture Christian School in Madison, Tennessee, where he was a highly touted receiver, winning numerous All-American awards during his Sophomore, Junior and Senior years. Turner participated in the 2005 U.S. Army All-American Bowl. He was also on his high school's basketball team until his sophomore year. He also participated on the track team for all four years.

Turner was ranked as the #1 wide receiver in the country by ESPN's Tom Lemming and #5 out of the top 100 high school football players for 2005 before signing with the Trojans.

== College career ==
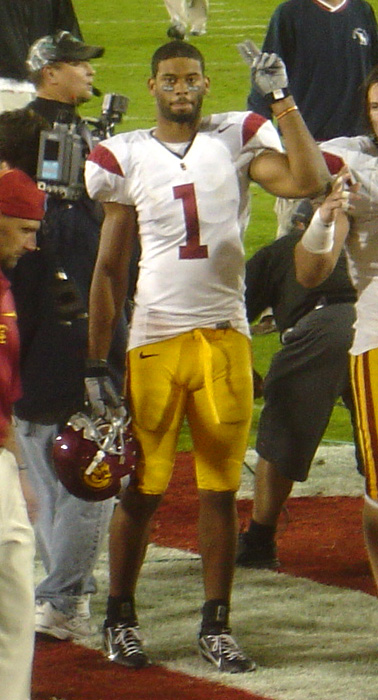
Turner celebrating after a USC victory

As a freshman at the University of Southern California during the 2005 season, Turner was an often-used backup wide receiver, catching 12 passes for 170 yards and 2 touchdowns. He appeared in 12 games, missing only the UCLA game due to injury.

As a sophomore, he moved up the depth chart to be the Trojans' third receiver under the John David Booty-led offense, after junior receiver Dwayne Jarrett and senior receiver Steve Smith. Turner stepped up several times when both Jarrett and Smith were injured and missed games over the season, including 12 catches for 116 yards against Washington.

Going into 2007 spring training, Turner was projected to be the leading receiver of the 2007 Trojan squad in the fall, his junior season, following in USC's recent line of star receivers starting with Mike Williams (who previously wore number 1) and Jarrett. He returned some of the most impressive plays during the Spring.

In 2007, Turner finished second on the team in receiving yards with 569 yards, following only TE Fred Davis, who led the team with 881 yards. With the departure of Davis to the NFL, Turner was expected to step up his production and become the number one option for the Trojans in 2008.

Turner was one of twelve USC players invited to the 2009 NFL Scouting Combine.

== Professional career ==
=== Miami Dolphins ===
Turner was selected by the Miami Dolphins in the third round (87th overall) of the 2009 NFL draft. He was cut after the 2010 Preseason.

=== New York Jets ===
On September 5, 2010, Turner was claimed off waivers by the New York Jets. Turner was later waived by the team on September 7, 2010. On September 10, 2010, Turner was re-signed by the team and placed on the practice squad. On September 25, 2010, Turner was added to the Jets active roster.

Following the team's Week Four matchup against the Buffalo Bills, Turner, along with teammate David Clowney, were released on October 4, 2010, to make room for defensive tackle Howard Green and wide receiver Santonio Holmes, who was returning from a four-game suspension. Turner was later re-signed to the team's practice squad on October 6, 2010.

The Jets activated Turner from the practice squad on November 18, 2010, as veteran receiver Jerricho Cotchery had suffered a groin injury. He was waived on September 3, 2011. He was re-signed to the practice squad on September 4, 2011. Turner was signed to the active roster on September 14.

Turner was waived by the Jets on September 11, 2012. He was re-signed on September 24, 2012. Turner was waived again on October 2, 2012, after the team signed Lex Hilliard.
