= J. D. Folsom =

American football player (born 1984)

No. 59
- Position: Linebacker

Personal information
- Born: August 19, 1984 (age 42); Salmon, Idaho, U.S.
- Listed height: 6 ft 3 in (1.91 m)
- Listed weight: 230 lb (104 kg)

Career information
- High school: Salmon
- College: Weber State
- NFL draft: 2009: 7th round, 214th overall pick

Career history
- Miami Dolphins (2009); Chicago Bears (2010)*; Tampa Bay Buccaneers (2010)*; Arizona Cardinals (2010)*; Miami Dolphins (2010)*; Tampa Bay Buccaneers (2010–2011)*
- * Offseason or practice squad member only

Awards and highlights
- Second-team NJCAA All-American (2006); 2× First-team All-Big Sky (2007–2008); First-team All-WSFL (2006)

Career NFL statistics
- Total tackles: 1
- Stats at Pro Football Reference

John David "J. D." Folsom (born August 19, 1984) is an American former professional football player who was a linebacker in the National Football League (NFL). He was selected by the Miami Dolphins in the seventh round of the 2009 NFL draft. He played college football at Weber State. Folsom was also a member of the Chicago Bears Tampa Bay Buccaneers and Arizona Cardinals.

== Early life ==
Folsom attended Salmon High School in Salmon, Idaho, where he played quarterback and linebacker and earned Second-team All-State honors as a senior. He was also a national qualified in team roping for the school's high school rodeo team.

== College career ==
=== Snow College ===
Folsom attended Snow College in Ephraim, Utah in 2003 before leaving to serve a two-year LDS church mission in Santa Cruz, Bolivia.

Upon his return in 2006, he helped Snow to an 11–1 record and a No. 2 ranking in the NJCAA. He recorded 69.5 tackles, 10 tackles for a loss and three sacks on his way to First-team All-WSFL and Second-team NJCAA All-American honors. He was also a First-team NJCAA Academic All-American.

=== Weber State ===
Folsom transferred from Snow to Weber State and became the team's starting strong side linebacker. He appeared in 11 games and recorded 73 tackles (30 solo), 5.5 tackles for a loss, two sacks and a fumble recovery. Following the season, Folsom earned First-team All-Big Sky honors.

Folsom started six of the 12 games in which he played for the Wildcats as a senior in 2008, recording 76 tackles (27 solo), four tackles for a loss, one interception, one forced fumble and one fumble recovery. He, again, earned First-team All-Big Sky honors.

== Professional career ==
=== Pre-draft ===
At his Weber State pro day, Folsom measured 6–3, 230 pounds and ran a 4.59 forty-yard dash, had a vertical jump of 32 1/2" and broad jump of 9'8", a 3-Cone drill of 7.30 and did 20 reps of 225 pounds on the bench press.

=== Miami Dolphins ===
Folsom was selected by the Miami Dolphins in the seventh round (214th overall) of the 2009 NFL draft. According to Folsom, he was surprised to be drafted and had already been preparing for a career after football, having been accepted to veterinary school at Oklahoma State and Washington State.

Folsom was waived by the Dolphins during final cuts on September 5 and re-signed to the team's practice squad the following day. He later was added to the 53-man roster on November 8, and saw his first game action the same day. He was waived again on November 13 and re-signed to the practice squad on November 18. Folsom was promoted to the active roster again on January 2, 2010 after linebacker Channing Crowder was placed on injured reserve.

Folsom was re-signed to the Dolphins practice squad on December 1, 2010 but released on December 8, 2010.

=== Chicago Bears ===
Folsom was a member of the Chicago Bears practice squad from September 6, 2010 to September 23, 2010 when he was released.

=== Tampa Bay Buccaneers ===
Folsom was signed to the Tampa Bay Buccaneers practice squad on September 29, 2010. Folsom was later released October 11, 2010. Folsom was re-signed on December 14, 2010. The Buccaneers released Folsom on July 29, 2011.

=== Arizona Cardinals ===
Folsom was signed to the Arizona Cardinals practice squad on October 27, 2010, and later released on November 9, 2010.

== Personal life ==
Folsom graduated from Oklahoma State University College of Veterinary Health Sciences with a Doctor of Veterinary Medicine degree, where he was also a veterinary student researcher. He was an associate veterinarian in Rexburg, Idaho. He is owner of Henry’s Fork Cattle Company. He also owned and operated Folsom Saddle Company.
