= Tearrius George =

American gridiron football player (born 1982)

No. 93
- Position: Defensive end

Personal information
- Born: December 3, 1982 (age 43); Fayetteville, North Carolina, U.S.
- Listed height: 6 ft 4 in (1.93 m)
- Listed weight: 258 lb (117 kg)

Career information
- College: Kansas State

Career history
- 2006: New York Jets*
- 2007: Calgary Stampeders
- 2008: Dallas Cowboys*
- 2008: New Orleans Saints
- 2009: Miami Dolphins*
- 2009: Dallas Cowboys*
- 2009–2010: Calgary Stampeders
- 2011–2016: Saskatchewan Roughriders
- * Offseason or practice squad member only

Awards and highlights
- CFL West All-Star (2014)
- Stats at CFL.ca

Tearrius George (born December 3, 1982) is a former gridiron football defensive end who played for the Calgary Stampeders and Saskatchewan Roughriders of the Canadian Football League. He was signed by the New York Jets as an undrafted free agent in 2006. He played college football at Kansas State.

George was also a member of the New Orleans Saints, Miami Dolphins and Dallas Cowboys.

== Early life ==
George prepped at Pine Forest High School in North Carolina.

== College career ==
George played at Kansas State University. In 2005 as a senior George played in 11 games and totaled 27 tackles (6 for losses) and 4 sacks, forced a fumble and recovered one. In 2004 as a junior he appeared in 10 games, with five starts and made 21 tackles, including 11 solo stops, six tackles for loss and three sacks, Prior to Kansas State he was a two-year starter at Los Angeles Valley College where he was All-conference honors as a freshman.

== Professional career ==
=== New York Jets ===
George signed as an undrafted free agent by the New York Jets in 2006.

=== Calgary Stampeders ===
After failing to make it in the NFL, George signed a contract with the Calgary Stampeders of the Canadian Football League. George played in 13 games for the Stamps during the 2007 CFL season. During which time he racked up 33 tackles, 8 quarterback sacks and 1 fumble recovery.

=== Return to the NFL (Cowboys, Saints, Dolphins, Cowboys II) ===
His impressive play in the CFL garnered interest from NFL clubs for the second time in his professional career. George signed with the Dallas Cowboys on August 28, 2009. After failing to make the final roster for the Cowboys, George was signed by the New Orleans Saints, with whom he would spend the 2008 NFL season deep on their linebacker depth chart. Following the 2008 season George was not resigned by the Saints. He spent time on two more NFL rosters in the lead up to the 2009 season, but was released prior to the start of the season by both the Dolphins and the Dallas Cowboys.

=== Calgary Stampeders II ===
After failing to play in any regular season games in his return to the NFL, George ultimately re-signed with the Calgary Stampeders on September 9, 2009; partway through the 2009 CFL season. George spent two seasons in Calgary.

=== Saskatchewan Roughriders ===
George signed with the Saskatchewan Roughriders as a free-agent on February 17, 2011. In his first four seasons with the Roughriders George flourished into a talented pass rushing force. In 2013 George finished tied for 1st on the Riders with 8 sacks, then finished second on the team in sacks the following year with 12. Following the 2014 season, at age 32, Tearrius George signed a contract extension with the Roughriders. He announced his retirement from football on May 2, 2016.
