= Miami Morays =

The Miami Morays were a professional indoor football team. They were a member of the NIFL. and played their home games at Miami Arena in Miami, Florida. They became the Florida Frenzy for the 2006 season. Coached by NFL Hall of Famer Larry Little and owned by a group that included former Miami Dolphin Oronde Gadsden, the Morays put on an impressive display to start, but eventually fell apart due in part to financial troubles. Denny Petro was the General Manager for the inaugural season. He built a solid foundation but resigned due to health concerns.
