= Tony McDaniel =

American football player (born 1985)

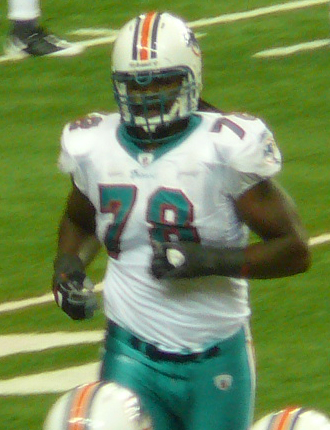
- McDaniel with the Miami Dolphins in 2009

No. 96, 78, 99, 77, 93, 69, 76
- Position: Defensive tackle

Personal information
- Born: January 20, 1985 (age 41); Hartsville, South Carolina, U.S.
- Listed height: 6 ft 7 in (2.01 m)
- Listed weight: 305 lb (138 kg)

Career information
- High school: Keenan (Columbia, South Carolina)
- College: Tennessee
- NFL draft: 2006: undrafted

Career history
- Jacksonville Jaguars (2006–2008); Miami Dolphins (2009–2012); Seattle Seahawks (2013–2014); Tampa Bay Buccaneers (2015); Seattle Seahawks (2016); New Orleans Saints (2017)*; San Francisco 49ers (2017); New Orleans Saints (2017)
- * Offseason or practice squad member only

Awards and highlights
- Super Bowl champion (XLVIII)

Career NFL statistics
- Total tackles: 278
- Sacks: 11.5
- Forced fumbles: 1
- Fumble recoveries: 3
- Stats at Pro Football Reference

Anthony Dewayne McDaniel (born January 20, 1985) is an American former professional football player who was a defensive tackle in the National Football League (NFL). He played college football for the Tennessee Volunteers. McDaniel was signed by the Jacksonville Jaguars as an undrafted free agent in 2006. He also played for the Miami Dolphins, Tampa Bay Buccaneers, Seattle Seahawks, New Orleans Saints, and San Francisco 49ers.

== College career ==
McDaniel played college football at the University of Tennessee but was dismissed from the team after assaulting a fellow Tennessee student during a pick up basketball game. He left college as a junior to enter the NFL draft and was picked up by Jacksonville as an undrafted free-agent.

== Professional career ==
McDaniel played in 11 games as reserve defensive tackle for the Jaguars during the 2006 season. McDaniel finished the year with 21 tackles and one sack. He was inactive for the final five games of the season while battling a hip injury.

On March 19, 2009, McDaniel was traded to the Miami Dolphins in exchange for a seventh-round pick in the 2009 NFL draft.

On March 28, 2013, McDaniel signed a one-year contract with the Seattle Seahawks. McDaniel and the Seahawks won Super Bowl XLVIII 43–8 over the Denver Broncos in February 2014, and would lose Super Bowl XLIX 28–24 to the New England Patriots the following season. On August 2, 2015, McDaniel was released for salary cap reasons after the Seahawks signed Russell Wilson and Bobby Wagner to long-term extensions that offseason.

On August 10, 2015, McDaniel signed a one-year contract with the Tampa Bay Buccaneers.

On August 16, 2016, McDaniel signed with his former team, the Seattle Seahawks.

On June 16, 2017, McDaniel signed with the New Orleans Saints. He was released by New Orleans as a part of final roster cuts on September 2.

On October 17, 2017, McDaniel signed with the San Francisco 49ers. On November 13, McDaniel was released by the 49ers.

On December 27, 2017, McDaniel re-signed with the New Orleans Saints. He was placed on injured reserve on January 10, 2018. McDaniel was released by the Saints on February 6.

== Legal troubles ==
=== 2005 ===
In January 2005, McDaniel assaulted fellow University of Tennessee student, Edward Goodrich, during a pick-up basketball game for which Goodrich received four broken bones and needed a metal plate inserted into his face to repair injuries. McDaniel, originally charged with aggravated assault, a felony, pleaded guilty to misdemeanor assault and agreed to pay restitution to Goodrich for an undisclosed amount. Goodrich had filed an $800,000 lawsuit against McDaniel in Knox County Circuit Court.

=== 2010 ===
On February 6, 2010, McDaniel was arrested on the charge of domestic battery against his girlfriend which allegedly occurred in the driveway of his Broward County Florida residence. He was released on bond the following day. McDaniel was the first of two defensive lineman for the Miami Dolphins, Phillip Merling being the second, to be arrested and charged with battery against a female during the 2010 offseason.

The charges were later reduced to disorderly contact, a misdemeanor. He pleaded no contest, was sentenced to six months probation, and was required to attend counseling. After pleading no contest, the NFL suspended McDaniel one game, without pay, for violating the league's personal conduct policy.

"I think he's been very good, very strong up front for us. I think he's been a dominant player at times."

— Jaguars head coach Jack Del Rio on McDaniel in August 2008
