= Donald Thomas (American football) =

American football player (born 1985)

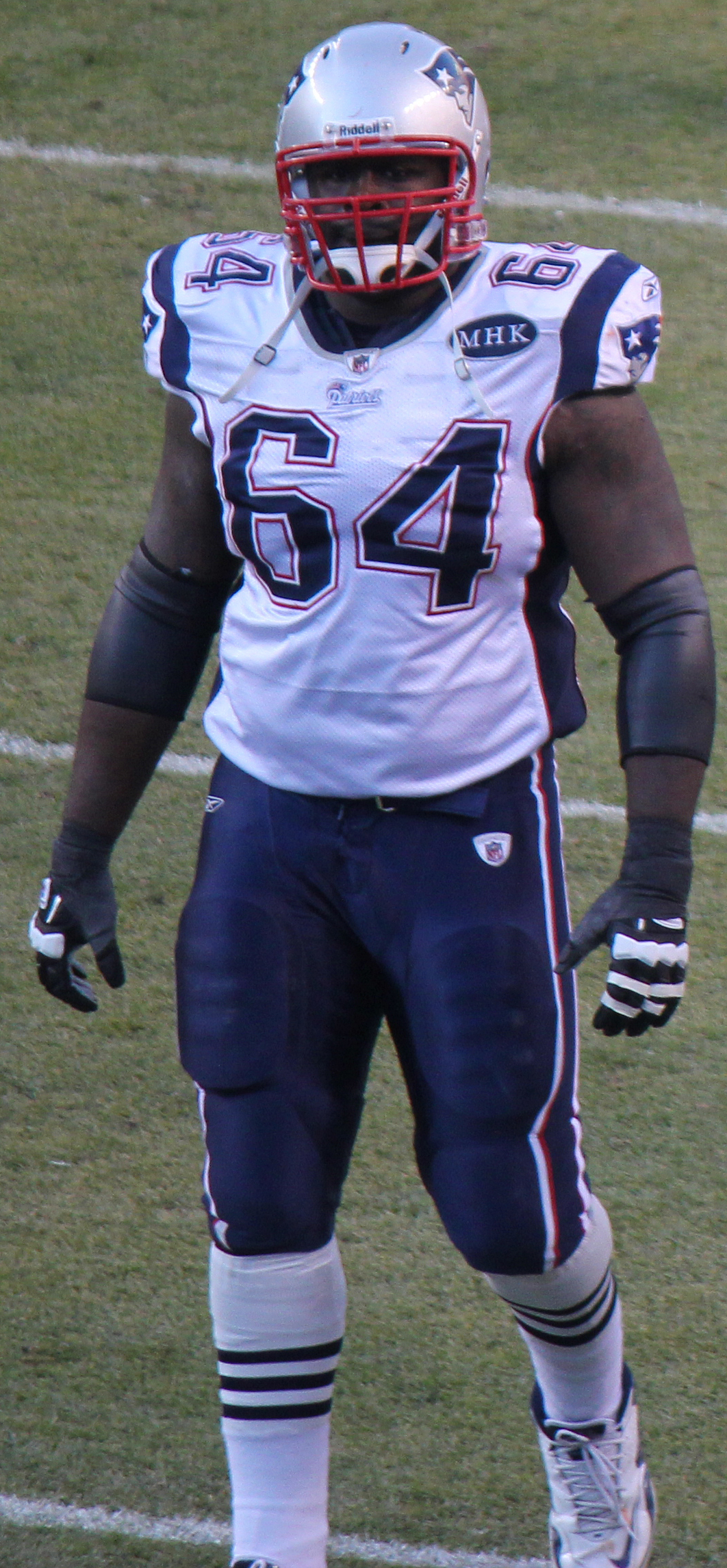
- Thomas with the Patriots in 2011

No. 66, 64
- Position: Guard

Personal information
- Born: September 25, 1985 (age 41); New Haven, Connecticut, U.S.
- Listed height: 6 ft 4 in (1.93 m)
- Listed weight: 305 lb (138 kg)

Career information
- High school: Hill (New Haven)
- College: Connecticut
- NFL draft: 2008: 6th round, 195th overall pick

Career history
- Miami Dolphins (2008–2009); Detroit Lions (2010); New England Patriots (2011–2012); Indianapolis Colts (2013–2014)

Awards and highlights
- First-team All-Big East (2007)

Career NFL statistics
- Games played: 45
- Games started: 23
- Fumble recoveries: 1
- Stats at Pro Football Reference

Donald Grant Thomas (born September 25, 1985) is an American former professional football player who was a guard in the National Football League (NFL). He was selected by the Miami Dolphins in the sixth round of the 2008 NFL draft. He played college football for the Connecticut Huskies.

Thomas was also a member of the Detroit Lions, New England Patriots, and Indianapolis Colts.

== Early life ==
Thomas, as a freshman, played two games with neighboring town West Haven High School JV team because Career Magnet High School does not have a football team. The New Haven Public School addressed Thomas's athletic eligibility and since Career had other varsity sports, they declared Thomas could not play for West Haven High School. Despite this, Thomas excelled at other sports, such as basketball, baseball, and soccer.

== College career ==
Thomas entered the University of Connecticut without the intention of playing sports. Once he played pick-up basketball with Huskies linebacker Danny Lansanah, Lansanah persuaded Thomas to try out for a walk-on position for University of Connecticut's varsity football team. Thomas' strong work ethic eventually earned him a full scholarship and a starting guard position where he was named All Big East in 2007 for UConn.

== Professional career ==
=== Miami Dolphins ===
Thomas was selected in the sixth round of the 2008 NFL draft as the 195th pick overall. He was promoted to the starting right guard on the third day of training camp over Trey Darilek. He made his NFL debut on September 7, 2008, against the New York Jets. Thomas injured his left foot in the second quarter but played through the injury and finished the game. The injury later proved to be a Lisfranc fracture and Thomas was placed on season-ending injured reserve on September 9. Thomas was released by the team at the start of the 2010 NFL season.

=== Detroit Lions ===
After trying out for several teams Thomas eventually signed with the Detroit Lions in November of the 2010 season. He was not in the active roster for any game in the 2010 NFL season.

=== New England Patriots ===
Thomas was signed by the New England Patriots on September 14, 2011, after a season-ending injury to starting center Dan Koppen created an opening on the roster. He has been utilized as a fullback in short yardage situations. Thomas was brought into the starting lineup on December 24 against his former team the Miami Dolphins when starting left guard Logan Mankins went down with a knee injury.

=== Indianapolis Colts ===
Thomas signed with the Indianapolis Colts on March 12, 2013. Thomas immediately became the starting left guard for the Colts, but was placed on injured reserve after sustaining a quadriceps tear in a week two loss to the Miami Dolphins, his former team.

On July 30, 2014, Thomas re-tore the same quadriceps muscle that cost him all but two games in 2013. On July 31, Thomas was officially put on injured reserve, ending his 2014 season.
