= Orion Martin =

American football player (born 1985)

Profile
- Position: Defensive end

Personal information
- Born: September 2, 1985 (age 41); Danville, Virginia, U.S.
- Listed height: 6 ft 2 in (1.88 m)
- Listed weight: 260 lb (118 kg)

Career information
- High school: Hargrave (Chatham, Virginia)
- College: Virginia Tech
- NFL draft: 2009: undrafted

Career history
- Miami Dolphins (2009)*; Detroit Lions (2009)*
- * Offseason or practice squad member only

Awards and highlights
- Second-team All-ACC (2008)
- Stats at Pro Football Reference

David Orion Martin (born September 2, 1985) is an American former football defensive end. He was signed by the Miami Dolphins as an undrafted free agent in 2009. He played college football at Virginia Tech.

Martin was also a member of the Detroit Lions.

== Early life ==
After high school, he played defensive end at Hargrave Military Academy in Chatham, Virginia for one semester to qualify for college. He attended George Washington High School in Danville, Virginia, prior to that. As a senior, had three sacks, eight receptions for 190 yards, and one interception. He was named first-team all-Western Valley as a senior. He also lettered in basketball as a forward.

== College career ==
In 2008, Martin was named Second-team All-ACC after playing 14 games and making 56 tackles (13 for losses) and 7.5 sacks for the Hokies. In 2007, Martin moved into the starting lineup at end and had 58 total tackles, including 10.5 behind the line, along with 15 hurries and 6.5 sacks. He also batted down five passes and forced a team-high three fumbles. In 2006, he contributed 29 tackles on the season, including 1.5 sacks. The year before, 2005, he played in all 13 games and made 23 tackles, seven quarterback hurries, and three passes broken up. In 2004, Martin joined the team as a walk-on for spring practice. He posted a 350-pound bench press, a 550-pound back squat, and a 34-inch vertical jump in spring testing and also turned in the best 40 meter dash by a defensive end with a time of 4.52 seconds. In 2004, he attended Norfolk State University for the 2004 spring semester, after finishing up at prep school.

== Professional career ==
=== Pre-draft ===
Pre-draft measurables
Height	Weight	40-yard dash	20-yard shuttle	Three-cone drill	Vertical jump	Broad jump	Bench press
6 ft 2 in (1.88 m)	262 lb (119 kg)	4.70 s	4.63 s	7.90 s	32 in (0.81 m)	9 ft 0 in (2.74 m)	24 reps
All values from NFL Combine.

Bench presses 400 pounds.

=== Miami Dolphins ===
Martin was signed by the Miami Dolphins as an undrafted free agent in 2009. The Dolphins moved Martin from defensive end to inside linebacker. He was waived on August 24.

=== Detroit Lions ===
Martin was claimed off waivers by the Detroit Lions on August 25, 2009, when the team released wide receiver Eric Fowler. He was waived on September 4, 2009.

== Coaching career ==
From 2013 to 2017 Martin was the head football coach at Martinsville High School in Martinsville, Virginia. In 2021, Martin was named new head football coach at the St. Albans School in Washington D.C.
