= Vernon Carey =

American football player (born 1981)

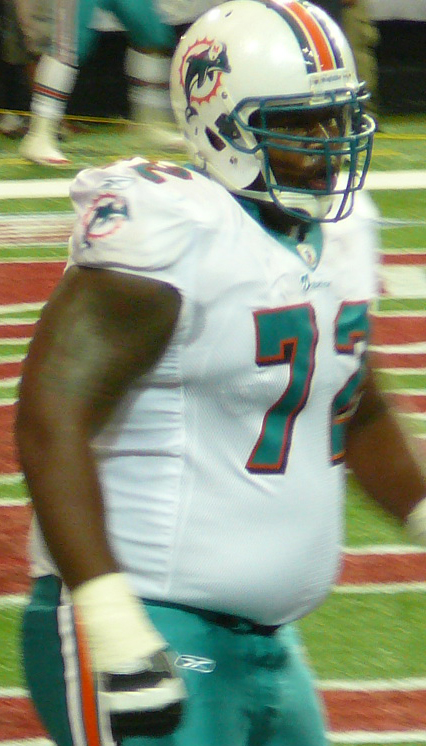
- Carey with the Dolphins in 2011.

No. 72
- Position: Offensive tackle

Personal information
- Born: July 31, 1981 (age 45); Miami, Florida, U.S.
- Listed height: 6 ft 5 in (1.96 m)
- Listed weight: 340 lb (154 kg)

Career information
- High school: Miami Northwestern (Miami, Florida)
- College: Miami (FL)
- NFL draft: 2004: 1st round, 19th overall pick

Career history
- Miami Dolphins (2004–2011)

Awards and highlights
- BCS national champion (2001); Second-team All-American (2003); 2× Second-team All-Big East (2002, 2003)

Career NFL statistics
- Games played: 121
- Games started: 107
- Fumble recoveries: 8
- Stats at Pro Football Reference

Vernon A. Carey Sr. (born July 31, 1981) is an American former professional football player who was an offensive tackle for eight seasons with the Miami Dolphins of the National Football League (NFL). He was selected by the Dolphins with the 19th overall pick in the 2004 NFL draft after playing college football for the Miami Hurricanes.

== Early life ==
Carey lettered in football and basketball at Miami Northwestern High School in Miami, Florida. He did not allow a sack during his junior and senior seasons, and was named as a Parade and USA Today first-team All-America pick as a senior. He also earned first team Class 6A All-State honors, and helped guide Northwestern to the Florida Class 6A state title.

== College career ==
Carey was a four-year letterman at the University of Miami from 2000 to 2003. In 1999, Carey was redshirted and was a member of the Hurricanes' scout team.

He played in eight games as a redshirt freshman in 2000. As a sophomore, Carey played in every game including one start, when he stepped in for injured left tackle Bryant McKinnie for the season finale against Virginia Tech. He started all 12 games at right offensive tackle as a junior, collecting eight touchdown-resulting blocks and 79 key blocks (42 pancakes). For his efforts, he was named as a second-team All-Big East Conference selection. He started 11 games as a senior, moving to left guard in spring drills after starting at right tackle as a junior. As a senior, he was named as a third-team All-America choice by the Associated Press and College Football News. He also earned second-team All-Big East Conference honors from the media. Carey led the Hurricanes in key blocks (knockdowns/pancakes) as both a junior and senior.

== Professional career ==
=== 2004 ===
Carey was a first round draft choice (19th overall) of his hometown Miami Dolphins in the 2004 NFL draft. He was the third offensive lineman selected, behind only Iowa offensive tackle Robert Gallery (second overall) and Arkansas offensive guard Shawn Andrews (16th overall). In order to select Carey, the Dolphins traded up one selection in the draft. The Dolphins signed Carey to a five-year, $8.6 million deal. Carey earned $6.3 million in total salary in his first year.

Carey was tried at both tackle and guard during training camp his rookie season. He went on to play in 14 games, including two starts. The first of his NFL career came when he opened at right tackle in place of the injured John St. Clair (ankle) at the New England Patriots on October 10, 2004. He also opened at that spot the following week at the Buffalo Bills. Carey struggled at times during his rookie campaign, but showed enough promise to be a solid starter in the near future.

=== 2005 ===
Carey was originally planned to be the starter at left tackle in 2005, but he was shifted to right tackle in August 2005. He went on to play in all 16 games, including 14 starts at right tackle. He secured the right tackle job following the benching of Stockar McDougle after Week 6. Carey was part of a line that yielded just 26 sacks—the fourth-lowest total in the NFL—and led a running game that averaged 118.6 yards an outing and 4.3 yards per rush attempt, which ranked seventh and fourth in the AFC. He took part in all but one offensive snap over the final 11 weeks of the season.

=== 2006 ===
The team once again considered moving Carey in 2006 – this time to right guard; however, that notion was quickly abandoned. During a season when the Dolphins' offensive line struggled early in the year, Carey was the lone bright spot. Starting all 16 games of the year at right tackle, Carey was by far the Dolphins' most consistent and productive offensive lineman.

=== 2007 ===
During a news conference that occurred during the first day of the 2007 NFL draft, head coach Cam Cameron announced Carey as the team's starting left tackle.

=== 2008 ===
With the Dolphins drafting Jake Long first overall, Carey was moved to the right tackle spot where he started all 16 games in 2008. According to Pro Football Focus, Carey was rated the seventh-best tackle in the NFL. He only yielded six sacks during the entire season with six hits and 13 pressures to quarterbacks.

=== 2009 ===
In 2009, Carey started all 16 games for the Dolphins at the right tackle spot. At the end of the 2009 season Carey had started 74 straight games for the Dolphins heading into the off-season. Carey gave up only four sacks in 2009.

=== 2010 ===
In 2010, Carey started just 12 games for the Dolphins at right tackle and missed four games due to injuries.

=== 2011 ===
In 2011, Carey started 15 games at right guard position while missing just one game.

=== Retirement ===
On August 5, 2012, Carey announced his retirement from football. He became an assistant football coach at Miami Northwestern High School. On April 19, 2018, he signed a one-day contract to retire as a member of the Dolphins.

== Personal life ==
Vernon wedded LaTavia, his long-time girlfriend, in October 2004. The couple has a son, Vernon Carey Jr. and twins, son Jaylen and daughter Taelynn. They reside in Miramar, Florida. Growing up, the Miami Dolphins were his favorite sports team and Reggie White was his favorite athlete. Carey lists "Martin" as favorite television show, The Notorious B.I.G. as favorite recording artist and the Bible as favorite book. He holds a B.A. in liberal arts from Miami.
