= Anthony Kimble =

American football player (born 1986)

No. 5
- Position: Running back

Personal information
- Born: April 9, 1986 (age 40)
- Listed height: 6 ft 0 in (1.83 m)
- Listed weight: 216 lb (98 kg)

Career information
- College: Stanford
- NFL draft: 2009: undrafted

Career history
- Miami Dolphins (2009)*; New York Jets (2009)*
- * Offseason or practice squad member only

Anthony Kimble (born April 9, 1986) is a former American football running back. He was signed by the Miami Dolphins as an undrafted free agent in 2009. He also played for the New York Jets.

== College career ==
Kimble attended Stanford University where he played college football for the Stanford Cardinal. During his career at Stanford, Kimble rushed for 1,940 yards and 18 touchdowns. He led Stanford in rushing in both 2006 and 2007.

== Professional career ==
Pre-draft measurables
Height	Weight	Arm length	Hand span	40-yard dash	10-yard split	20-yard split	20-yard shuttle	Three-cone drill	Vertical jump	Broad jump	Bench press
6 ft 0 1/4 in (1.84 m)	216 lb (98 kg)	30 1/8 in (0.77 m)	9 1/2 in (0.24 m)	4.54 s	1.56 s	2.62 s	4.40 s	7.08 s	36.0 in (0.91 m)	10 ft 2 in (3.10 m)	17 reps

=== Miami Dolphins ===
Kimble signed with the Miami Dolphins as rookie free agent on May 1, 2009. He was waived on August 24.

=== New York Jets ===
After being released by the Dolphins, Kimble signed with the New York Jets.
