= Ikechuku Ndukwe =

American football player (born 1982)

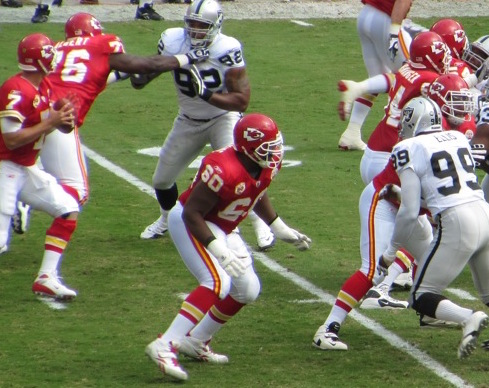
- Ndukwe #60, Chiefs vs Oakland, 9/20/09

No. 63, 68, 60
- Position: Guard

Personal information
- Born: July 17, 1982 (age 44); Morgantown, West Virginia, U.S.
- Listed height: 6 ft 4 in (1.93 m)
- Listed weight: 338 lb (153 kg)

Career information
- High school: Coffman (Dublin, Ohio)
- College: Northwestern
- NFL draft: 2005: undrafted

Career history
- New Orleans Saints (2005)*; Washington Redskins (2005–2006); Baltimore Ravens (2006–2007); Miami Dolphins (2007–2008); Kansas City Chiefs (2009); New York Giants (2011)*; San Diego Chargers (2011)
- * Offseason or practice squad member only

Career NFL statistics
- Games played: 35
- Games started: 18
- Stats at Pro Football Reference

Ikechuku "Ike" Ndukwe // (born July 17, 1982) is an American former professional football player who was a guard in the National Football League (NFL). He was signed by the New Orleans Saints as an undrafted free agent in 2005. He played college football for the Northwestern Wildcats.

Ndukwe was also a member of the Washington Redskins, Baltimore Ravens, Miami Dolphins, Kansas City Chiefs, New York Giants, and San Diego Chargers. He is the older brother of former NFL safety Chinedum Ndukwe.
