= Lex Hilliard =

American football player (born 1984)

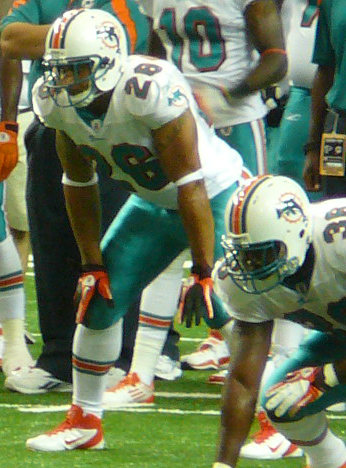
- Hilliard with the Miami Dolphins in 2011

No. 26, 30, 36
- Positions: Running back, fullback

Personal information
- Born: July 30, 1984 (age 42); Kalispell, Montana, U.S.
- Listed height: 5 ft 11 in (1.80 m)
- Listed weight: 235 lb (107 kg)

Career information
- High school: Flathead (Kalispell)
- College: Montana
- NFL draft: 2008: 6th round, 204th overall pick

Career history
- Miami Dolphins (2008–2011); Minnesota Vikings (2012)*; New England Patriots (2012); New York Jets (2012–2013)
- * Offseason or practice squad member only

Awards and highlights
- 2× First-team All-Big Sky (2004, 2005); Second-team All-Big Sky (2007)

Career NFL statistics
- Rushing attempts: 48
- Rushing yards: 163
- Receptions: 30
- Receiving yards: 233
- Total touchdowns: 5
- Stats at Pro Football Reference

Lex Douglas Hilliard (born July 30, 1984) is an American former professional football player who was a running back and fullback in the National Football League (NFL). He played college football for the Montana Grizzlies and was selected by the Miami Dolphins in the sixth round of the 2008 NFL draft.

== Early life ==
Hilliard attended and played high school football at Flathead High School in Kalispell, Montana. During his sophomore year, he set a school record with 1,384 rushing yards and 14 touchdowns. During his time at Flathead, he was a three-time all-state and all-conference selection, as well as team captain his final two seasons. He finished his career with 3,419 rushing yards, 4,410 all-purpose yards and 44 touchdowns—all school records.

Hilliard also earned three letters in track and one in wrestling. He competed in the 100, 200 and 4x100 meter relay as well as the shot put, earning two all-league selections.

== College career ==
As a true freshman at the University of Montana in 2003, Hilliard was originally going to redshirt but was activated for the second game of the season. His 590 rushing yards ranked ninth in the Big Sky Conference that season.

Despite starting just four games as a sophomore in 2004, Hilliard rushed for a team-leading 972 yards and 17 touchdowns on his way to earning first-team All-Big Sky honors. He posted five 100-yard rushing games during the season, and his 17 touchdowns were best in the conference.

Hilliard earned first-team All-Big Sky honors for the second straight season, as well as being named a finalist for the Walter Payton Award, as a junior in 2005 after rushing for 1,322 yards. His rushing total ranked 19th in the nation and second in school history behind only Yohance Humphery in 2001. He had six 100-yard games during the season, including a 237-yard performance against Cal Poly which was the second-highest single-game rushing total in school history.

In 2006, Hilliard was redshirted after suffering a season-ending Achilles tendon injury.

"Now that we're in the '07 season and he's back with us, it's just a godsend to have him back. I see Lex having a monster season."

— Bobby Hauck, Grizzlies head coach

Hilliard returned to the field as a fifth-year senior in 2007, appearing in 11 games for the Grizzlies. He rushed for 1,132 yards and 16 touchdowns on his way to second-team All-Big Sky honors. He topped the 100-yard rushing plateau seven times during the season.

During his five-year career at Montana, Hilliard racked up 4,106 rushing yards and 50 touchdowns on 5.0 average. He also added 57 receptions for 591 yards and two touchdowns.

=== Statistics ===
Career statistics
		Rushing					Receiving				
Year	G	Att	Yds	TD	Lng	Avg.	Rec.	Yds	TD	Lng	Avg.
2003	12	125	590	5	38	4.7	9	117	0	21	13.0
2004	14	190	972	17	61	5.1	22	211	0	39	9.6
2005	12	249	1,322	12	69	5.3	11	144	2	66	13.1
2006	Did not play										
2007	11	242	1,132	16	54	4.7	15	119	0	24	7.9
Total	49	806	4,016	50	69	5.0	57	591	2	66	10.4

== Professional career ==
=== Pre-draft ===
Following his collegiate career, Hilliard was invited to the NFL Scouting Combine. At his Pro Day on March 19, he measured in at 5-foot-11¼ and 234 pounds. He ran the 40-yard dash in 4.66 seconds, short shuttle in 4.03 seconds and cone drill in 6.93 seconds. He also had a 36½-inch vertical leap and a 10-foot, three-inch long jump.

In early April, it was reported that Hilliard was scheduled to visit with the New York Giants.

=== Miami Dolphins ===
"I'll play whatever. It may have to be on special teams. I'm ready to go. I'm ready to do whatever it takes to help the Miami Dolphins win."

— Lex Hilliard, April 2008

Hilliard was selected by the Miami Dolphins in the sixth round (204th overall) of the 2008 NFL draft. On May 19, he signed a four-year contract with the Dolphins. Viewed as a fullback/tailback hybrid, Hilliard stated he had no preference on where he played.

In the 2008 preseason, Hilliard finished third on the team with 68 rushing yards on a 2.8-yard average. He also caught three passes for 24 yards. On August 30, the team waived Hilliard during final cuts. He was re-signed to the practice squad the following day.

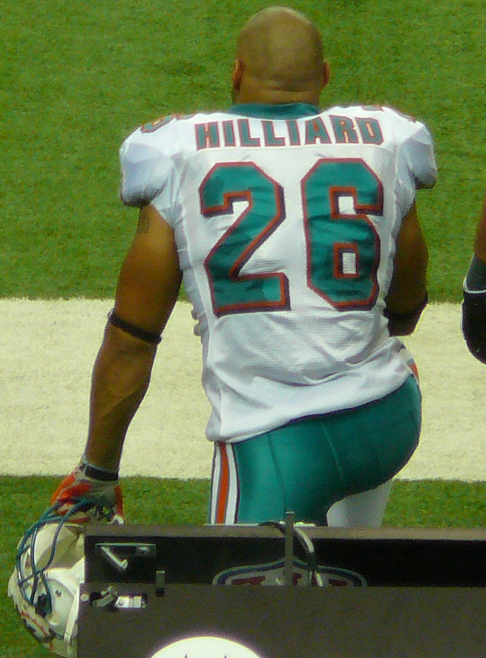
Hilliard with the Dolphins in 2009

After spending the entire 2008 season on the practice squad, Hilliard was re-signed on January 5, 2009.

=== Minnesota Vikings ===
Hilliard signed with the Minnesota Vikings on March 18, 2012. On August 31, 2012, as the Vikings reduced their roster down to league maximum of 53 players, he was released.

=== New England Patriots ===
On September 4, 2012, Hilliard signed with the New England Patriots. He was released on September 19, 2012. During his short tenure with the Patriots, Hilliard played in two games recording one rush attempt for two yards.

=== New York Jets ===
Hillard was signed by the New York Jets on October 2, 2012. Hilliard was placed on injured reserve on August 21, 2013, after fracturing his right scapula in practice.

== Personal life ==
Hilliard was one of the victims of professional scam artist/fraudster Peggy Ann Fulford (Peggy King, Peggy Williams, Peggy Ann Barard, etc.), losing $130 thousand, amongst the $5.79 million in total she stole from him and other athletes. Hilliard had met Fulford through his then-teammate, Ricky Williams. Fulford, who was indicted by the FBI in December 2016, continued her criminal activity until sentenced in February 2018 to 10 years in prison and full financial restitution to her victims. In 2025, Hillard was inducted into the Montana Football Hall of Fame.
