= John Nalbone =

American football player (born 1986)

No. 86
- Position: Tight end

Personal information
- Born: May 14, 1986 (age 40); Trenton, New Jersey, U.S.
- Listed height: 6 ft 4 in (1.93 m)
- Listed weight: 255 lb (116 kg)

Career information
- High school: Lawrence (NJ)
- College: Monmouth
- NFL draft: 2009: 5th round, 161st overall pick

Career history
- Miami Dolphins (2009–2010); Minnesota Vikings (2010)*; Denver Broncos (2010)*; Philadelphia Eagles (2011)*; Cincinnati Bengals (2011)*; Denver Broncos (2011)*; Seattle Seahawks (2011–2012)*; Dallas Cowboys (2012)*
- * Offseason or practice squad member only

Awards and highlights
- 2× First-team All-NEC (2007–2008); 2× Second-team All-NEC (2005–2006)
- Stats at Pro Football Reference

Johnathan Gregory Nalbone (born May 14, 1986) is an American former professional football player who was a tight end in the National Football League (NFL). He played college football for the Monmouth Hawks and he was selected by the Miami Dolphins in the fifth round of the 2009 NFL draft. Nalbone was also a member of the Minnesota Vikings, Denver Broncos, Philadelphia Eagles, Cincinnati Bengals, Seattle Seahawks and Dallas Cowboys.

== Professional career ==
=== Miami Dolphins ===
Nalbone was selected by the Miami Dolphins in the fifth round (161st overall) of the 2009 NFL draft. He was waived on October 31, 2009, but was re-signed to the team's practice squad on November 3. He spent the remainder of the 2009 season on the team's practice squad, and was re-signed to a future contract on January 7, 2010. Nalbone was waived by the Dolphins on September 21.

=== Minnesota Vikings ===
Nalbone was signed to the Minnesota Vikings' practice squad on September 28, 2010. He was released on October 13.

=== Denver Broncos (first stint) ===
Nalbone was signed to the Denver Broncos practice squad on October 20. His practice squad contract expired at the conclusion of the season.

=== Philadelphia Eagles ===
Nalbone was signed to a future contract by the Philadelphia Eagles on January 11, 2011. He was waived on August 3.

=== Cincinnati Bengals ===
He was claimed off waivers by the Cincinnati Bengals on August 4, 2011. He was waived on September 3.

=== Denver Broncos (second stint) ===
The Broncos signed him to their practice squad on September 20, 2011, only to be released on September 23.

=== Seattle Seahawks ===
The Seattle Seahawks signed him to their practice squad on November 16, 2011, they waived him on June 16, 2012

=== Dallas Cowboys ===
The Dallas Cowboys acquired him from the Seahawks waivers on June 19, 2012.
