= Phillip Merling =

American football player (born 1985)

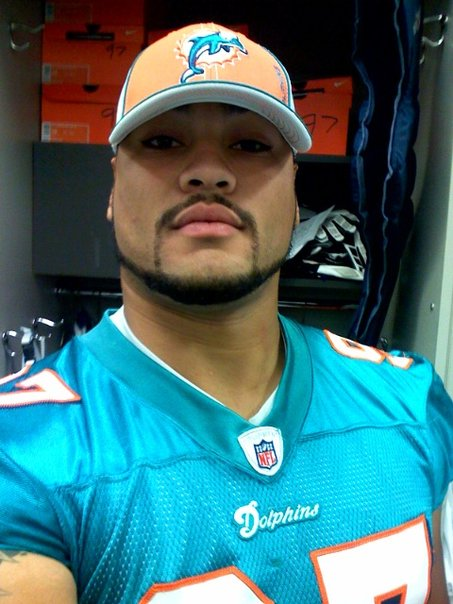
- Merling with the Miami Dolphins in 2009

No. 97, 94, 93
- Position: Defensive end

Personal information
- Born: August 19, 1985 (age 41); Portsmouth, Virginia, U.S.
- Listed height: 6 ft 5 in (1.96 m)
- Listed weight: 315 lb (143 kg)

Career information
- High school: Fork Union Military Academy (Fork Union, Virginia)
- College: Clemson
- NFL draft: 2008: 2nd round, 32nd overall pick

Career history
- Miami Dolphins (2008–2011); Green Bay Packers (2012); Washington Redskins (2013)

Awards and highlights
- Second-team Rivals.com All-Freshman (2005); Second-team All-ACC (2007)

Career NFL statistics
- Total tackles: 70
- Sacks: 3.5
- Fumble recoveries: 2
- Interceptions: 1
- Defensive touchdowns: 1
- Stats at Pro Football Reference

Phillip Blaine Merling (born August 19, 1985) is an American former professional football player who was a defensive end in the National Football League (NFL). He played college football for the Clemson Tigers and was selected by the Miami Dolphins in the second round of the 2008 NFL draft.

He was also a member of the Green Bay Packers and Washington Redskins.

== Early life ==
Merling played tight end and defensive end at Fork Union Military Academy in 2004. He totaled 38 catches for 647 yards and five touchdowns on offense and on defense he added five sacks, 51 tackles, and eight pass breakups. He had 20 catches for 430 yards and four scores as a senior and totaled 96 tackles and thirty four sacks as a senior. For that performance he was the MVP at Fork Union. After his senior year at Cordova High School, in Cordova, Tennessee, he played in the Tennessee/Kentucky All-Star game. He was also First-team All-state and All-region as a senior at Cordova High School. He played tight end and defensive end and helped his team reach the 6A state play-offs. Phillip had 9 quarterback sacks, 10 pass knock downs, 4 caused fumbles, 7 tackles for loss and he had 28 pass receptions for 415 yards and 4 touchdowns. Prior to Fork Union, Merling attended Calhoun County High School in Saint Matthews, SC, for three years.

Merling was also All-conference, All-region, and All-area in basketball as a sophomore and junior. He averaged 20 points and 12 rebounds as a senior and averaged 15 points and 13 rebounds as a junior.

== College career ==
Merling appeared in 38 games at Clemson, starting his final 26. He delivered 146 tackles (99 solos), 12 sacks for minus 80 yards, 31 stops for losses totaling 152 yards and 45 quarterback pressures.

In 2007, he recorded 78 total tackles (first among defensive linemen), including 17 tackles-for-loss and seven sacks. He was instrumental to the Tigers’ top 10 national ranking in scoring and total defense. Was voted Second-team All-ACC for his efforts. He was named ACC Defensive Lineman of the Week three times, more than any other ACC player. It marked the first time since 2001 that a Clemson player was named ACC Player of the Week three times.

He started all 13 games of the 2006 season, finishing with 46 total tackles on Clemson's top-16 total and scoring defense. Merling had had 10 tackles for loss, second-most on the team behind Gaines Adams. Merling also recorded three sacks, 20 quarterback hurries and one forced fumble that year.

Merling played 271 snaps during his true freshman season in 2005. Won the 12th Man Award for the defense as a freshman and was a Second-team freshman All-America defensive end by Rivals.com.

== Professional career ==
=== Pre-draft ===
Merling underwent a successful laparoscopic by athletic pubalgia surgeon Dr. William Myers to repair a sports hernia. As a result, he did not participate in most drills at the combine or the Clemson Pro day due to his recovery from surgery. However, on April 25, 2008, Merling had a private "pro day" for scouts and "performed well". Merling worked out hard for about 45 minutes. "The kid's a pretty safe pick," one scout said. "He's not going to get outflanked," another said, referring to Merling's stoutness at the point of attack. No numbers have been released from the workout.

Measurables

Height: 6'4½" Weight: 271 lbs
40-yard time: 4.63, 4.73, 4.84 (pre-combine)
225-pound bench press: 17 reps

=== Miami Dolphins ===
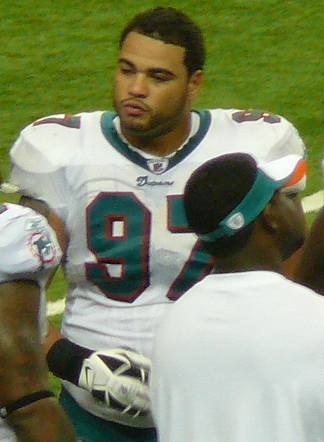
Merling with the Dolphins in 2009.

Merling was selected in the second round with the 32nd overall pick in the 2008 NFL draft by the Miami Dolphins. Although being picked 32nd overall, Merling is considered a second-round pick due to the involvement of the New England Patriots in the Spygate Scandal, resulting in the loss of their first round pick. In Week 17 of the 2008 season, he intercepted a Brett Favre pass and returned it for a touchdown, helping the Dolphins clinch the 2008 AFC East Division championship.

Before the 2010 season he suffered a torn Achilles' Tendon and was ruled out for the season, although he was activated before the Dolphins' Week 13 game with Cleveland.

Merling was waived by the Dolphins on April 23, 2012. He had only made seven tackles over the last two seasons.

=== Green Bay Packers ===
Merling signed with the Green Bay Packers on May 23, 2012. He was released by the Green Bay Packers on November 6, 2012

=== Washington Redskins ===
The Washington Redskins signed Merling to a reserve contract on January 8, 2013. On October 1, he was released, along with John Potter, in order to make room on the roster for the reinstatement of Rob Jackson and Jarvis Jenkins.

== Career statistics ==
=== NFL ===
Year	Team	GP	COMB	TOTAL	AST	SACK	FF	FR	FR YDS	INT	IR YDS	AVG IR	LNG	TD	PD
2008	MIA	16	26	20	6	1.0	0	1	0	1	25	25	25	1	2
2009	MIA	16	33	24	9	2.5	0	1	1	0	0	0	0	0	3
2010	MIA	5	3	3	0	0.0	0	0	0	0	0	0	0	0	1
2011	MIA	10	4	3	1	0.0	0	0	0	0	0	0	0	0	2
2012	GB	3	2	1	1	0.0	0	0	0	0	0	0	0	0	0
2013	WSH	3	2	1	1	0.0	0	0	0	0	0	0	0	0	0
Career		53	70	52	18	3.5	0	2	0	1	25	25	25	1	8

=== College ===
		Tackles									
Year	GP	Total	Solo	Ast	TFL	Sck	FF	FR	INT	PD	TD
2005	12	22	17	5	4	2	1	0	0	0	0
2006	13	46	31	15	10	3	1	0	0	4	0
2007	13	78	51	27	17	7	2	1	0	0	0
Total	38	146	99	47	31	12	3	1	0	4	0

== Personal ==
Merling was arrested in Broward County, Florida on May 26, 2010, and charged with aggravated battery against his then-fiancée Kristen Lennon, who was two months pregnant at the time. Merling was the second of two defensive linemen for the Miami Dolphins, Tony McDaniel being the first, to be arrested and charged with battery against a female during the 2010 offseason. The charges were later dropped by the Broward State Attorney's Office after Lennon moved back to her home state of South Carolina and did not return to testify against him, because she could not travel, as she was 8 months pregnant at the time.

In the fall of 2014, Merling enrolled at Clemson, where he worked as a graduate assistant for the football team. He left the university that October. That same month, a warrant was issued for his arrest for failure to pay child support to Kristen Lennon.
