= Brandon Fields (American football) =

American football player (born 1984)

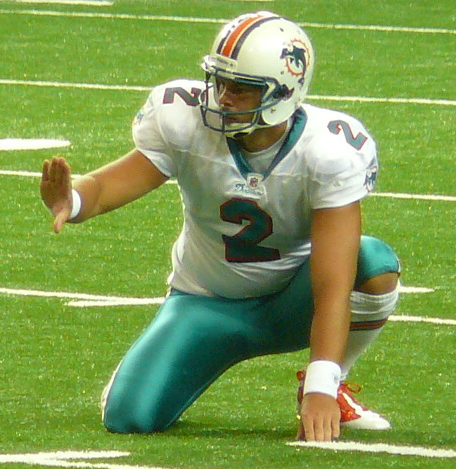
- Fields with the Miami Dolphins in 2011

No. 4, 2
- Position: Punter

Personal information
- Born: May 21, 1984 (age 42); Southfield, Michigan, U.S.
- Listed height: 6 ft 5 in (1.96 m)
- Listed weight: 249 lb (113 kg)

Career information
- High school: St. John's Jesuit (Toledo, Ohio)
- College: Michigan State
- NFL draft: 2007: 7th round, 225th overall pick

Career history
- Miami Dolphins (2007–2014); New Orleans Saints (2015)

Awards and highlights
- Second-team All-Pro (2013); Pro Bowl (2013); Consensus All-American (2004); 3× First-team All-Big Ten (2003, 2004, 2006); Nat Moore Community Service Award (2011, 2012)

Career NFL statistics
- Punts: 604
- Punting yards: 28,192
- Punting average: 46.7
- Inside 20: 209
- Longest Punt: 74
- Stats at Pro Football Reference

Brandon David Fields (born May 21, 1984) is an American former professional football player who was a punter for nine seasons in the National Football League (NFL). He played college football for the Michigan State Spartans, earning consensus All-American honors. He was selected by the Miami Dolphins in the seventh round of the 2007 NFL draft. He also played for the New Orleans Saints.

== Early life ==
Fields was born in Southfield, Michigan. He attended St. John's Jesuit High School in Toledo, Ohio, and played for the St. John's Titans high school football team. During his senior season, he handled kickoff duties for the Titans football team and was a first-team all-state selection as a punter while also playing tight end. Fields also lettered in basketball for St. John's.

== College career ==
Fields attended Michigan State University, and played for the Michigan State Spartans football team from 2003 to 2006. He earned numerous honors during his freshman season in 2003. He led the Big Ten Conference and was second in the nation with a 46.4-yard average. In a game against Nebraska, Fields set an Alamo Bowl record with a 62-yard punt.

Fields had the most productive season of his collegiate career as a sophomore in 2004, leading the nation with a 47.9-yard punting average. Honors on the season included numerous All-Big Ten and All-American selections. He was also a finalist for the Ray Guy Award, given annually to the nation's top punter.

As a junior in 2005, Fields handled the kickoff duties for the first four games of the season in addition to being the team's punter. He wrapped up his collegiate career with a 45.0-yard punting average as a senior.

On December 13, 2010, the Big Ten Conference instituted the Eddleman-Fields Punter of the Year award to honor Fields and Thomas "Dike" Eddleman, Illinois punter from 1946 to 1948.

=== Awards and honors ===
During his collegiate career at Michigan State, Fields earned the following honors:

Freshman (2003):

- Mid-season SI.com All-American
- Second-team coaches All-Big Ten
- First-team media All-Big Ten
- First-team Sporting News Freshman All-American
- Honorable mention Rivals.com All-American
- Second-team Sporting News All-American

Sophomore (2004):

- Second-team coaches All-Big Ten
- First-team media All-Big Ten
- First-team AP All-American
- First-team FWAA All-American
- First-team Rivals.com All-American
- First-team SI.com All-American
- First-team Walter Camp All-American
- Ray Guy Award finalist

In addition to his football accolades, Fields was an Academic All-Big Ten selection each of his four years at Michigan State.

== Professional career ==
=== Pre-draft ===
Prior to the 2007 NFL draft, Fields was invited to the NFL Scouting Combine in Indianapolis. At his Pro Day in April, Fields measured in at 6-foot-4 7/8 and 236 pounds.

=== Miami Dolphins ===
Fields was drafted by the Miami Dolphins in the seventh round (225th overall) of the 2007 NFL Draft. The pick used to select Fields was acquired from the St. Louis Rams earlier in the offseason in exchange for punter Donnie Jones. Fields was the first punter drafted by the Dolphins since Brent Bartholomew in 1999 and was the first rookie to handle punting duties for the team on a full-time basis since Reggie Roby in 1983. On May 24, the Dolphins signed Fields to a four-year contract.

Fields handled punting duties for the Dolphins during all 16 games of his rookie season. His 77 punts averaged 43.2 yards in length, with 10 of them landing inside the opponent's 20-yard line. He also served as the holder on field goals and extra points. His gross average ranked seventh in the AFC and led all four rookie punters in the NFL that season and has improved in all facets of his game every season since.

During the 2008 offseason, it was reported that new Dolphins Vice President Bill Parcells "absolutely loves Brandon Fields." The team did not pursue competition for him that offseason or since.

On December 27, 2013, the NFL announced Fields as a selection for the 2014 Pro Bowl.

Fields was released on September 1, 2015.

=== New Orleans Saints ===
Fields signed with the New Orleans Saints on October 6, 2015, to replace Thomas Morstead while he recovered from a strained quadriceps. Fields played in two games, and was then released on October 20, 2015.

=== Retirement ===
On September 29, 2017, Fields announced his retirement from the NFL.

== NFL career statistics ==
| Year | Team | GP | Punting | | | | | | |
| Year | Team | GP | Punts | Yards | Avg | Lng | Net | Ins20 | Blk |
|---|---|---|---|---|---|---|---|---|---|
| 2007 | MIA | 16 | 77 | 3,327 | 43.2 | 61 | 36.6 | 10 | 0 |
| 2008 | MIA | 16 | 74 | 3,249 | 43.9 | 71 | 35.5 | 24 | 0 |
| 2009 | MIA | 16 | 75 | 3,472 | 46.3 | 66 | 39.8 | 25 | 0 |
| 2010 | MIA | 16 | 73 | 3,249 | 46.2 | 61 | 37.8 | 31 | 2 |
| 2011 | MIA | 16 | 78 | 3,810 | 48.8 | 70 | 41.1 | 32 | 0 |
| 2012 | MIA | 16 | 74 | 3,715 | 50.2 | 67 | 41.2 | 29 | 0 |
| 2013 | MIA | 16 | 85 | 4,150 | 48.8 | 74 | 42.4 | 33 | 0 |
| 2014 | MIA | 16 | 58 | 2,688 | 46.3 | 60 | 38.6 | 21 | 1 |
| 2015 | NO | 2 | 10 | 412 | 41.2 | 74 | 35.1 | 4 | 0 |
| Career | | 130 | 604 | 28,192 | 46.7 | 74 | 39.3 | 209 | 3 |

== Personal life ==
His wife, Katie, whom he married during the 2008 offseason, earned her degree in chiropractic medicine at Palmer College of Chiropractic in Port Orange, Florida. He is part owner of Inside The Five Brewery in Sylvania, Ohio and Perrysburg, Ohio.

In 2016, Fields earned a Master of Business Administration degree from the University of Miami Business School.
