= Jeff Ireland =

American football executive (born 1970)

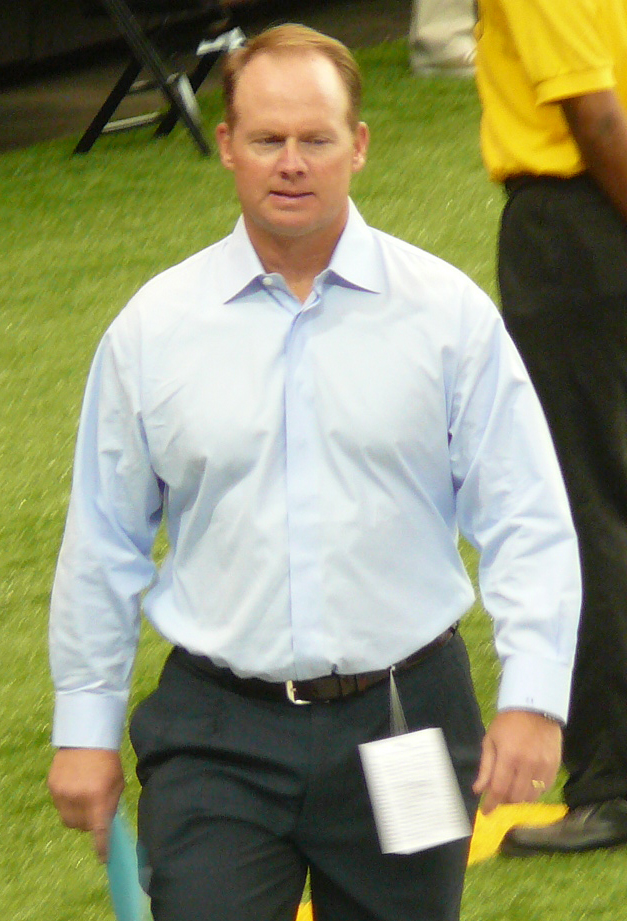
- Ireland in 2011

New Orleans Saints
- Title: Assistant general manager & college scouting director

Personal information
- Born: March 11, 1970 (age 56); Abilene, Texas, U.S.

Career information
- Position: Placekicker
- High school: Abilene (TX) Cooper
- College: Baylor

Career history

Coaching
- North Texas (1992–1993) Special teams coach

Operations
- NFL Scouting Combine (1994–1996) Scout; Kansas City Chiefs (1997–2000) Scout; Dallas Cowboys (2001–2004) National scout; Dallas Cowboys (2005–2007) Vice president of college & pro scouting; Miami Dolphins (2008–2013) General manager; Seattle Seahawks (2014) Draft consultant; New Orleans Saints (2015–present) Assistant general manager & college scouting director
- Executive profile at Pro Football Reference

Jeff Ireland (born March 11, 1970) is an American professional football executive who is the assistant general manager and college scouting director for the New Orleans Saints of the National Football League (NFL). He previously served as the general manager of the Miami Dolphins from 2008 to 2014 and also served for the Dallas Cowboys and Kansas City Chiefs in various executive roles. Before his career as a football executive, Ireland was an assistant football coach at the University of North Texas, and a player at Baylor University. Ireland was also a childhood ball boy for the Chicago Bears.

== High school and college career ==
Ireland was a wide receiver and placekicker and soccer forward for Cooper High School in the 1980s, and then a placekicker for the Baylor Bears from 1988 to 1991. He became the starter at placekicker as a sophomore.

At Baylor, Ireland was known for making difficult kicks but missing the easy ones. Against Rice University in 1991, for example, he made a 58-yard field goal, then missed field goals of 43, 45, and 27 yards. Baylor, a 20.5 point favorite, lost the game by three points. Baylor was ranked 8th in the Associated Press poll at that time.

Ireland finished his college career third on the school's all-time scoring list with 213 points. His 45 career field goals, including a 58-yard effort against Rice in 1991, were school records.

He is a member of the Pi Kappa Alpha fraternity.

== Executive career ==
=== Early years ===
Ireland began his professional career as the special teams coach at the University of North Texas from 1992 to 1993. He became a scout for the NFL Scouting Combine from 1994 to 1996. He later was hired to be an area scout for the Kansas City Chiefs from 1997 to 2000.

=== Dallas Cowboys ===
Ireland was a national talent-scout for the Dallas Cowboys from 2001 to 2005. During this period, the team drafted four future-Pro Bowl selections: safety Roy Williams; offensive lineman Andre Gurode; cornerback Terence Newman; and tight end Jason Witten. In 2005, Ireland was promoted to Vice President of College and Pro Scouting.

In what would be Ireland's final season with the Cowboys (in 2007), the Cowboys went 13-3 and won the NFC East Division Championship. At the time of his departure in January 2008, 38 of the team's 53 players were acquired over the past three years, including 12 of 22 starters.

=== Miami Dolphins ===
On January 2, 2008, Ireland was officially hired by then-executive vice president of football operations Bill Parcells as general manager of the Miami Dolphins. Ireland and Parcells had worked together previously, when Parcells was the head coach and football operations boss at the Dallas Cowboys (2003-2006).

On December 28, 2008, the Miami Dolphins defeated the New York Jets 24–17, securing the AFC East title and becoming the first team in NFL history to reach the playoffs after having won only one game during the previous season. In reaction to the victory and title, Ireland granted a rare interview to ESPN's Tim Graham, saying, "It's a remarkable feeling. I'm so proud of these coaches, these players. Coach always asked us and the players right there in training camp, 'Why not us?' Well, Why not us? I'm just so proud of the coaches and what they've done."

In April 2010, Ireland asked NFL prospect Dez Bryant during a formal interview whether Bryant's mother was a prostitute, after Bryant allegedly told Ireland that his dad was a pimp and that his mother worked for his father. Bryant denies ever telling Ireland that his father was a pimp. Ireland later apologized to Bryant for asking the question.

On September 7, 2010, Ireland assumed full command of operations on a day-to-day basis. Bill Parcells became a daily consultant for the Miami Dolphins, a position he has since left.

Ireland's tenure with the Dolphins became controversial as the club's on-field successes declined after 2008. Public efforts to recruit free agent players were unsuccessful and Ireland's handling of his Dez Bryant interview was criticized.

In 2011, some fans pitched in to have a plane fly over Sun Life Stadium reading: "MR ROSS: SAVE OUR DOLPHINS. FIRE IRELAND."

In 2013, Ireland came under further scrutiny when he suggested that offensive tackle Jonathan Martin "punch" offensive guard Richie Incognito after allegations of bullying towards Martin on the part of Incognito came to light. A second airplane banner was flown over Sun Life Stadium on November 17, during warmups for the Dolphins' Week 11 game against the San Diego Chargers, reading "MR ROSS: WE TOLD YOU SO 2 YEARS AGO #FIREIRELAND".

On January 7, 2014, the Dolphins announced that they had mutually parted ways with Ireland.

=== Seattle Seahawks ===
On April 26, 2014, the Seattle Seahawks announced they had hired Jeff Ireland to work as a consultant for the 2014 NFL draft, the Seahawks also announced that a possible long-term deal would be negotiated after the draft. Ireland's tenure with the Seattle Seahawks, however, was short-lived as the team decided to move on without him after only one month.

=== New Orleans Saints ===
On January 20, 2015, Adam Schefter tweeted "It's not just Dennis Allen joining the Saints. Former Dolphins GM Jeff Ireland is being hired to do college scouting for the Saints, per source.". He was hired to be the Saints' assistant general manager & college scouting director. During Ireland's tenure, the Saints' roster improved, and Ireland was allowed to build his own scouting department in 2016. In 2017, Saints' head coach Sean Payton praised Ireland, stating that Ireland "has done an outstanding job" in overhauling the draft process for the Saints.

== Personal life ==
Ireland is the stepson of College Football Hall of Famer E. J. Holub, who played center and linebacker for the Kansas City Chiefs and Dallas Texans. Ireland is also the grandson of Jim Parmer, who played for the Philadelphia Eagles and was a personnel executive for the Chicago Bears. Jeff and his wife, Rachel, have four children.
