= 2008 Miami Dolphins season =

43rd season in franchise history

- General manager: Jeff Ireland
- Head coach: Tony Sparano
- Offensive coordinator: Dan Henning
- Defensive coordinator: Paul Pasqualoni
- Home stadium: Dolphin Stadium

Results
- Record: 11–5
- Division place: 1st AFC East
- Playoffs: Lost Wild Card Playoffs (vs. Ravens) 9–27
- Pro Bowlers: RB Ronnie Brown; T Jake Long; LB Joey Porter

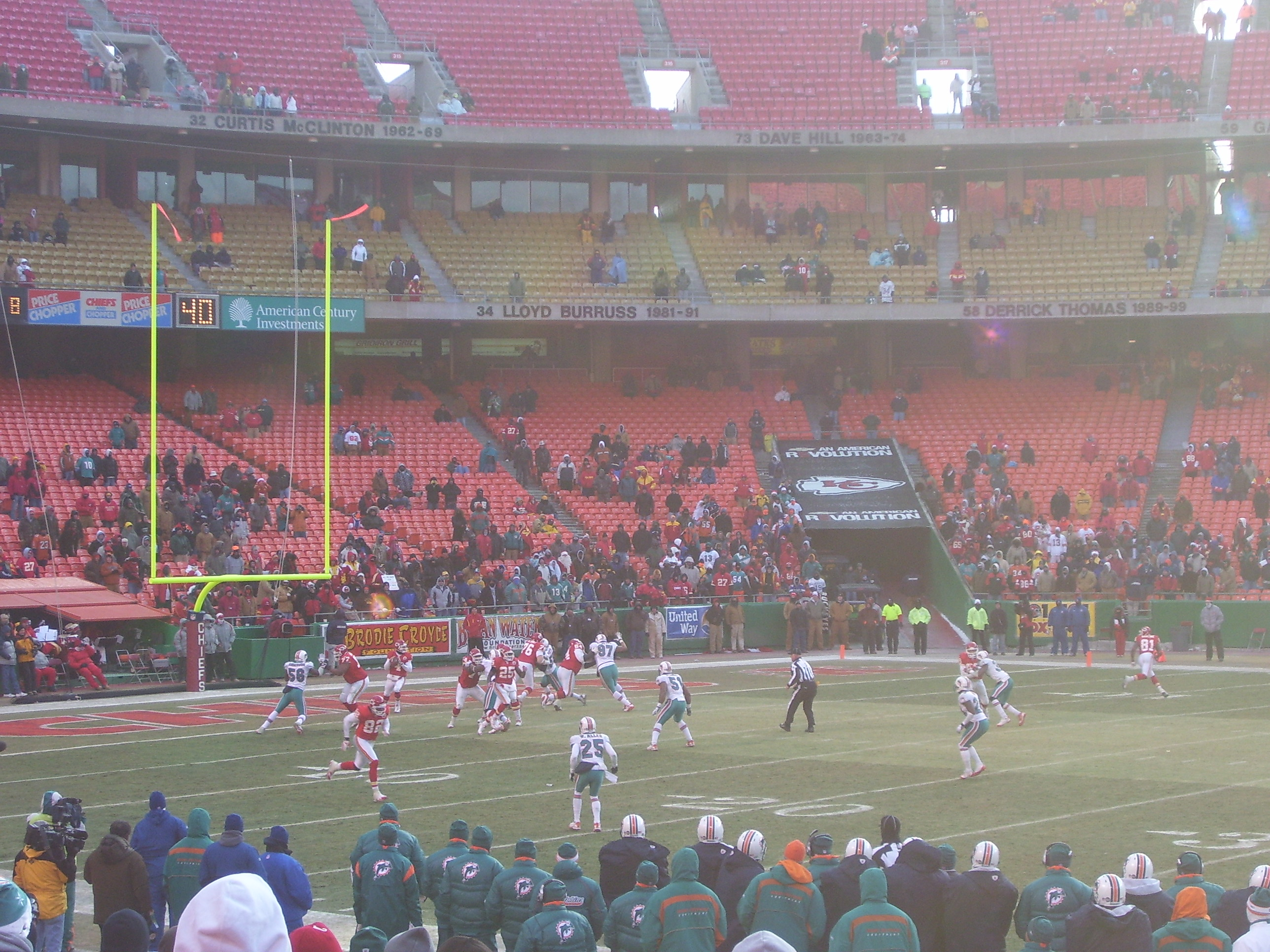
The Miami Dolphins at Arrowhead Stadium during their game against the Kansas City Chiefs, on December 21, 2008

The 2008 Miami Dolphins season was the franchise's 39th season in the National Football League (NFL), the 43rd overall and the first under new head coach Tony Sparano. During the regular season the Dolphins completed the greatest single-season turnaround in NFL history, going from a 1–15 regular season record in 2007 to an 11–5 record in 2008. The previous record for most improved team one year after a 1–15 season belonged to the 1997 New York Jets, who went 9–7. The 2008 Dolphins became the second team to accomplish a 10-game turnaround, first done by the 1999 Indianapolis Colts and then later matched by the 2025 New England Patriots. Additionally, Miami won the AFC East, becoming the first team in NFL history to win their division after only having one win the previous season. The division title also snapped the Patriots' 5-year streak of winning the AFC East. The Dolphins' season came to an end in the Wild Card round when they were defeated by the Baltimore Ravens which, coincidentally, was also the only team that the Dolphins had beaten the prior season, saving the Dolphins from suffering a winless season. With their rebound 11–5 record and division title, the Dolphins had hopes of achieving their first playoff victory since 2000, or to possibly become the first team ever to make the Super Bowl after winning only one game the previous season, similar to how the Carolina Panthers went 1–15 in 2001 and made Super Bowl XXXVIII just two seasons later.

The 2008 season was the first with Bill Parcells as executive vice president of football operations, Jeff Ireland as general manager, and Tony Sparano as head coach.

With a league-worst 1–15 record in 2007, the Dolphins held the first pick in the 2008 NFL draft and selected Michigan offensive tackle Jake Long. The offseason also saw the departure of two Pro Bowlers and long-time Dolphins with the release of linebacker Zach Thomas and trade of defensive end Jason Taylor.

The 2008 season was the last season in which the Miami Dolphins had a winning record and qualified for the playoffs before the 2016 team accomplished the feat. This also currently remains the latest season where the Dolphins won a division title.

This season was also notable for the Dolphins wide-spread use of the Wildcat offense. Though previously used by other teams in several other seasons, this package was fully installed by the Dolphins by week 3, and led to an upset win over the defending AFC Champion New England Patriots. Until 2019, this was the Dolphins' last road win over the Patriots. Additionally, this was the last season that the AFC East was won by a team other than the Patriots until the 2020 Buffalo Bills snapped the Patriots' streak of 11 straight AFC East championships.

== Offseason personnel moves ==
=== Front office ===
On December 27, 2007, Dolphins owner Wayne Huizenga hired former NFL head coach and ESPN analyst Bill Parcells as executive vice president of football operations. Parcells signed a four-year deal with the Dolphins less than a day after turning down a similar offer from the Atlanta Falcons.

Just a few days after Parcells' hiring, three men were dismissed from the Dolphins' front office. The most notable of the three was general manager Randy Mueller, who had been hired by the team in 2005. Also dismissed were assistant director of player personnel Mike Baugh and college scouting coordinator Rick Thompson.

Three days after Mueller's dismissal, Parcells hired Jeff Ireland as the team's new general manager. Ireland had worked for the Dallas Cowboys the past seven years, including the last three as vice president of college and pro scouting. Ireland had worked with Parcells previously, when the latter was head coach of the Cowboys from 2003 to 2006. Although Ireland was officially given final say on personnel decisions, it was speculated that Parcells was actually in control, and did not hold the title of general manager so that the team could hire a front office executive from another team.

On January 15, the Dolphins reeled in another former Cowboys executive when they hired Brian Gaine as assistant director of player personnel. Gaine had previously spent the past three seasons as the Cowboys' assistant director of pro scouting, working with both Parcells and Ireland during that time.

Following the 2008 NFL draft, it was reported on May 1 that the Dolphins had fired scouts Ellis Rainsberger, Jack Glowik and Roger Pollard. The team's vice president of media relations, Harvey Greene, said Rainsberger had retired, and did not comment on the other two reported firings.

=== Coaches ===
==== Head coach ====
One day after hiring of Jeff Ireland as general manager, the Dolphins fired head coach Cam Cameron after just one season on the job. Cameron led the Dolphins to an NFL worst 1–15 record in 2007, which was also the worst in franchise history. Additionally, all but two members of the coaching staff were dismissed. The only coaches retained were assistant special teams coach Steve Hoffman and linebackers coach George Edwards. Both Hoffman and Edwards were coaches for the Dallas Cowboys during Ireland's tenure with the team.

A search for Cameron's replacement began almost immediately after his firing. Various candidates were rumored, many of which had some connection to Parcells and/or Ireland. Rumored candidates included Cleveland Browns head coach Romeo Crennel, Dallas Cowboys assistant Tony Sparano, Cowboys secondary coach Todd Bowles, Arizona Cardinals running backs coach Maurice Carthon and Cardinals offensive coordinator Todd Haley. Additionally, Baltimore Ravens defensive coordinator Rex Ryan and Minnesota Vikings defensive coordinator Leslie Frazier were contacted. The Washington Post suggested that Washington Redskins defensive coordinator Gregg Williams could be a candidate as well.

The first interview scheduled was Sparano, who met with the Dolphins on Saturday, January 11. Sparano had previously met with the Atlanta Falcons and Baltimore Ravens regarding their head coaching vacancies. On January 6, it was reported that Sparano would be offered the Dolphins' head coaching job, and that he would accept. The Dolphins denied the report later that day, saying it was an initial interview only and that the team had interviews with others planned over the next few days. However, the addition of quarterbacks coach David Lee, a former Cowboys assistant, fueled speculation that Sparano was indeed going to the next head coach of the Miami Dolphins.

The team then proceeded to interview Frazier, Ryan and Tennessee Titans defensive coordinator Jim Schwartz. After the Dallas Cowboys lost to the New York Giants in the divisional round of the 2007 NFL playoffs on January 13, speculation grew that Sparano's hiring was imminent. On January 16, the Dolphins ended their search by naming Sparano the eighth head coach in franchise history. He received a four-year contract believed to be worth between $2.5 and $2.7 million per season.

==== Assistants ====
Parcells and Ireland made their first coaching staff addition on January 7, luring Ole Miss offensive coordinator David Lee to be quarterbacks coach. Lee, who briefly followed Houston Nutt to Ole Miss after serving as his offensive coordinator at Arkansas in 2007, worked with Parcells and Ireland as the Cowboys' quarterbacks coach from 2003 to 2006. The addition fueled speculation that Sparano was indeed going to the next head coach of the Miami Dolphins.

Two days after hiring Sparano as their head coach, the Dolphins made their second assistant coach hiring. On January 18, Mike Maser was named the team's new offensive line coach. Maser had previously served in the same capacity for the Carolina Panthers from 2003 to 2006, and worked with Sparano when both were assistants for the Jacksonville Jaguars in 2002.

Over the next week, the Dolphins filled various positions on Sparano's staff. On January 22, former Kansas City Chiefs running backs coach James Saxon was hired in the same capacity for the Dolphins. Also hired that day was former Atlanta Falcons strength and conditioning coach Evan Marcus, who took the same job with Miami.

On January 23, the Dolphins added four more assistant coaches to their staff when they named Paul Pasqualoni as their defensive coordinator, Todd Bowles as assistant head coach/secondary, Kacy Rodgers as defensive line coach and David Corrao as defensive quality control coach. Pasqualoni, Bowles and Rodgers all came from the Dallas Cowboys' staff, while Corrao was most recently linebackers coach at the University of Mississippi.

A day later, former UCLA head coach Karl Dorrell was named the team's new wide receivers coach. Five more coaches were added to the staff on January 28 when the Dolphins named John Bonamego as their special teams coordinator, George DeLeone as their tight ends coach, David Puloka as assistant strength and conditioning coach, Jim Reid as outside linebackers coach and Steve Bush as offensive quality control coach.

The Dolphins made their final addition to the staff on February 4, hiring Dan Henning as offensive coordinator. Henning, who had most recently served as offensive coordinator for the Carolina Panthers from 2002 to 2006, had previous worked for the Dolphins under Don Shula as quarterbacks and wide receivers coach in 1979–1980.

== Staff ==
When the Dolphins' coaching staff was completed with the hiring of offensive coordinator Dan Henning on February 14, only two of the 17 assistant coaches under Sparano (Edwards and Hoffman) were holdovers from the previous season's staff. Three of the new coaches (Bowles, Pasqualoni and Rodgers) had experience with Parcells, Ireland and Sparano in Dallas. The completed staff was as follows:

2008 Miami Dolphins staff
Front office: Team Owner / Chairman - H. Wayne Huizenga; President/COO – Bryan Wiedmeier; Vice chairman – Don Shula; Executive vice president of football operations – Bill Parcells; General manager – Jeff Ireland; Head coaches: Head coach – Tony Sparano; Assistant head coach/secondary – Todd Bowles; Offensive coaches: Offensive coordinator – Dan Henning; Quarterbacks – David Lee; Running backs – James Saxon; Wide receivers – Karl Dorrell; Tight ends – George DeLeone; Offensive line – Mike Maser; Offensive quality control – Steve Bush	Defensive coaches: Defensive coordinator – Paul Pasqualoni; Defensive line – Kacy Rodgers; Inside linebackers – George Edwards; Outside linebackers – Jim Reid; Defensive quality control – David Corrao; Special teams coaches: Special teams coordinator – John Bonamego; Kicking – Steve Hoffman; Strength and conditioning: Head strength and conditioning – Evan Marcus; Strength and conditioning assistant – David Puloka

== Roster Moves ==
=== Departures ===
- February 11 – Terminated the contracts of quarterback Trent Green, wide receiver Marty Booker, offensive tackle L. J. Shelton and defensive tackle Keith Traylor.
- February 11 – Waived offensive tackle Anthony Alabi, offensive tackle Marion Dukes, guard Marquay Love, offensive lineman Joe Toledo and defensive tackle Anthony Bryant.
- February 14 – Released linebacker Zach Thomas.
- April 24 – Released the following seven players: quarterback Casey Bramlet, linebacker Marcello Church, safety Tuff Harris, cornerback Jereme Perry, wide receiver Kerry Reed, linebacker Mark Washington and wide receiver Chandler Williams. The team also waived safety Cameron Worrell, who tore his ACL in 2007, after he failed a physical.
- April 29 – Released quarterback Matt Baker and defensive tackle Steve Fifita.
- May 5 – Waived wide receiver Marcel Reece, defensive end Derreck Robinson, linebacker Abraham Wright and cornerback Aaron Lane. Reece and Lane were signed as undrafted free agents the previous week, while Robinson and Wright were with the Dolphins in 2007.
- May 16 – Waived offensive lineman Drew Mormino after he failed a physical. Mormino spent the 2007 season on injured reserve with a shoulder injury.
- June 6 – Released placekicker Dave Rayner.

=== Re-signings ===
- January 7 – Re-signed wide receivers Kerry Reed and Chandler Williams, guard Marquay Love and linebacker Marcello Church. All finished the 2007 season on the Dolphins' practice squad.
- March 3 – Re-signed safety Yeremiah Bell to a one-year, $1.4 million contract.
- March 5 – Re-signed cornerback Michael Lehan to a three-year, $4.95 million contract.

=== Signings ===
- January 30 – Signed quarterback Matt Baker, offensive lineman Trey Darilek and linebacker Junior Glymph. Baker was with the Dallas Cowboys in 2006, while Darilek and Glymph were both in training camp with Dallas in 2007.
- February 8 – Signed cornerback Joey Thomas. He was originally drafted by the Green Bay Packers in the third round of the 2004 NFL draft and had most recently spent training camp with the Cowboys in 2007.
- February 28 – Signed wide receiver David Kircus, formerly of the Denver Broncos and Detroit Lions.
- February 29 – Signed tight end Sean Ryan (Jets) to a one-year deal.
- February 29 – Signed wide receiver Ernest Wilford (Jaguars) to a four-year, $13 million contract with $6 million guaranteed.
- March 1 – Signed linebacker Charlie Anderson (Texans) to a three-year contract.
- March 1 – Signed quarterback Josh McCown (Raiders) to a two-year, $6.25 million contract.
- March 1 – Signed guard Justin Smiley (49ers) to a five-year, $25 million contract with $9 million guaranteed.
- March 1 – Signed defensive end Randy Starks (Titans) to a five-year, $21 million contract with $7 million guaranteed.
- March 1 – Signed linebacker Reggie Torbor (Giants) to a four-contract.
- March 5 – Signed fullback Boomer Grigsby (Chiefs) to a one-year contract.
- March 11 – Signed safety Keith Davis (Cowboys) to a two-year contract.
- March 12 – Signed placekicker Dave Rayner (Chargers) to a one-year contract.
- March 14 – Signed cornerback Nathan Jones (Cowboys) to a two-year contract.
- March 16 – Signed wide receiver Tab Perry (Bengals) to a one-year contract.
- March 28 – Signed safety Chris Crocker (Falcons) to a one-year, $1.15 million contract with a $300,000 signing bonus.
- April 14 – Signed safety Will Billingsley (North Carolina A&T) as a street free agent. Billingsley was eligible for the 2007 NFL draft but was not drafted and remained unsigned throughout the year.
- May 19 – Signed offensive lineman Steve McKinney (Texans) to a one-year contract.

=== Trades ===
- February 29 – Acquired defensive tackle Jason Ferguson from the Dallas Cowboys for a sixth-round pick in the 2009 NFL draft. The teams also swapped sixth-round picks in the 2008 NFL draft.
- April 26 – Acquired linebacker Akin Ayodele and tight end Anthony Fasano from the Dallas Cowboys in exchange for the team's fourth-round pick (100th overall) in the 2008 NFL draft. The pick was later traded to the Oakland Raiders and used to select cornerback Tyvon Branch.
- July 21 – Traded defensive end Jason Taylor to the Washington Redskins in exchange for a second-round pick in 2009 and a sixth-round pick in 2010.

=== Free agency ===
The Dolphins entered free agency $44 million under that year's $116 million salary cap – the highest in the league at the time. The team cleared between $13–15 million by cutting players leading up to free agency.

=== Free agents ===
UFA: Unrestricted free agent, RFA: Restricted free agent, ERFA: Exclusive-rights free agent

Position	Player	Free agency status	Date signed	2008 team
SS	Yeremiah Bell	UFA	March 3	Miami Dolphins
WR	Greg Camarillo	ERFA	March 19	Miami Dolphins
RB	Jesse Chatman	UFA	March 9	New York Jets
RB	Patrick Cobbs	ERFA	March 19	Miami Dolphins
RB	Samkon Gado	RFA (not tendered)	November 4	St. Louis Rams
OG	Rex Hadnot	UFA	March 10	Cleveland Browns
CB	Michael Lehan	UFA	March 5	Miami Dolphins
OL	Cory Lekkerkerker	RFA (not tendered)	May 14	Dallas Cowboys
QB	Cleo Lemon	UFA	February 29	Jacksonville Jaguars
OG	Gene Mruczkowski	UFA	June 6	New England Patriots
OG	Ike Ndukwe	ERFA	March 19	Miami Dolphins
DL	Chase Page	ERFA (not tendered)		
LB	Derrick Pope	UFA	March 14	Minnesota Vikings
OT	Mike Rosenthal	UFA		
FS	Lance Schulters	UFA	August 18	New Orleans Saints
LB	Donnie Spragan	UFA	August 2	Buffalo Bills

= Retained by Dolphins

=== 2008 NFL draft ===
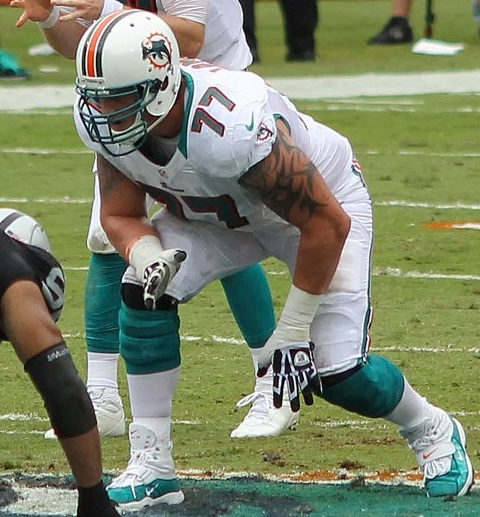
Jake Long, the 1st overall selection in the 2008 NFL draft

Due to their league-worst 1–15 record in 2007, the Dolphins secured the first overall pick in the 2008 NFL draft on April 26. The Dolphins used it to draft Michigan offensive tackle Jake Long.

Including Long, the Dolphins selected the following nine players in the 2008 NFL Draft:

2008 Miami Dolphins draft
Round	Pick	Player	Position	College	Notes
1	1	Jake Long *	OT	Michigan	
2	32	Phillip Merling	DE	Clemson	
2	57	Chad Henne	QB	Michigan	from San Diego
3	66	Kendall Langford	DE	Hampton	from Kansas City via Detroit
4	110	Shawn Murphy	OT	Utah State	from Chicago
6	176	Jalen Parmele	RB	Toledo	from Detroit
6	195	Donald Thomas	OG	Connecticut	from Dallas
6	204	Lex Hilliard	RB	Montana	Compensatory pick
7	245	Lionel Dotson	DE	Arizona	Compensatory pick
Made roster * Made at least one Pro Bowl during career

Notes

- The Dolphins own second-round pick, the first of the round, was the 32nd overall in the draft rather than the 33rd because the New England Patriots forfeited their first-round pick (31st overall) after the Spygate incident.
- The Dolphins acquired a second-round pick from the San Diego Chargers in a trade that sent wide receiver Chris Chambers to San Diego on October 16, 2007.
- The Dolphins sent their fifth-round pick to the Kansas City Chiefs in exchange for quarterback Trent Green on June 5, 2007.
- The Dolphins and Dallas Cowboys swapped sixth-round draft picks in trade that brought defensive tackle Jason Ferguson to Miami.
- The last of the Dolphins' picks in the sixth and seventh rounds were awarded by NFL due to free agents lost the previous offseason.

==== Draft day trades ====
On the first day of the draft, the Dolphins traded second-year running back Lorenzo Booker to the Philadelphia Eagles in exchange for a fourth-round pick (115th overall) in the 2008 NFL draft.

On the second day of the draft, the Dolphins acquired the Detroit Lions' third-round pick (66th overall) as well as their sixth-round pick (176th overall) in exchange for the Dolphins' third-round pick (64th overall). The Lions used the pick to select running back Kevin Smith, while the Dolphins took defensive end Kendall Langford with the third-round pick and running back Jalen Parmele with the sixth-rounder.

Later on Day 2, the Dolphins traded the fourth-round pick acquired from the Eagles, along with a seventh-round pick (208th overall), to the Chicago Bears in exchange for the 110th overall selection. The Dolphins used this pick to select guard Shawn Murphy. The 115th overall pick was eventually dealt by the Bears the Tampa Bay Buccaneers, who used it to select defensive tackle Dre Moore. The Bears used the seventh-round pick to select defensive end Ervin Baldwin.

==== Draft pick signings ====
In the weeks leading up to the draft, the Dolphins began contract negotiations with Jake Long. On April 14, Peter King of Sports Illustrated reported that the Dolphins had given Long a deadline to accept their contract offer (believed to be worth less than 2007 No. 1 pick JaMarcus Russell received from the Oakland Raiders); otherwise, they would move on to another prospect. On April 22, the Dolphins officially signed Long to a five-year, $57.75 million contract with $30 million guaranteed, assuring they would take him first overall. On May 19, the Dolphins signed sixth-rounders Jalen Parmele and Lex Hilliard and seventh-rounder Lionel Dotson to contacts. On May 23, sixth-round pick Donald Thomas was signed to a multi-year deal. On July 11, the Dolphins signed third-round pick Kendall Langford to a multi-year deal.

=== Undrafted free agents ===
Following the 2008 NFL draft, the Dolphins signed 18 undrafted free agents. They were:

- Cornerback Scorpio Babers (Sam Houston State)
- Wide receiver Davone Bess (Hawaii)
- Linebacker Titus Brown (Mississippi State)
- Center Michael Byrne (Delaware)
- Placekicker Dan Carpenter (Montana)
- Wide receiver Jayson Foster (Georgia Southern)
- Offensive tackle Dan Gore (Boise State)
- Offensive tackle Daren Heerspink (Portland State)
- Cornerback Aaron Lane (Purdue)
- Wide receiver Selwyn Lymon (Purdue)
- Tight end Matthew Mulligan (Maine)
- Linebacker Kelly Poppinga (BYU)
- Wide receiver Marcel Reece (Washington)
- Defensive tackle Kory Robertson (Virginia Tech)
- Linebacker Keith Saunders (Alabama)
- Center Matt Spanos (Southern California)
- Defensive tackle Anthony Toribio (Carson-Newman)
- Wide receiver Justin Wynn (Grand Rapids CC)

Two failed to survive a week with the team, as the Dolphins released Lane and Reece on May 5. Less than a month after being signed, Robertson decided to retire. On June 9, the Dolphins signed wide receiver John Dunlap (NC State) after he attended a minicamp on a tryout basis.

=== Reserve lists ===
- May 27 – Placed defensive tackle Kory Robertson on the reserve/retired list.
- May 29 – Placed wide receiver Tab Perry on injured reserve with a torn Achilles tendon.

== Roster ==
=== Opening camp roster ===
Miami Dolphins 2008 opening training camp roster
Quarterbacks: 9 John Beck; 7 Chad Henne; 4 Josh McCown; 10 Chad Pennington; Running backs: 23 Ronnie Brown; 38 Patrick Cobbs; 46 Boomer Grigsby FB; 26 Lex Hilliard FB; 45 Reagan Mauia FB; 31 Jalen Parmele; 34 Ricky Williams; Wide receivers: 11 Anthony Armstrong; 15 Davone Bess; 83 Greg Camarillo; 17 John Dunlap; 14 Jayson Foster; 19 Ted Ginn Jr. KR/PR; 82 Derek Hagan; 85 David Kircus; 84 Selwyn Lymon; 18 Ernest Wilford; Tight ends: 81 Anthony Fasano; 80 Aaron Halterman; 88 David Martin; 48 Matthew Mulligan; 87 Justin Peelle; 89 Sean Ryan	Offensive linemen: 60 Michael Byrne C/G; 72 Vernon Carey T; 69 Trey Darilek OL; 67 Daren Heerspink T; 77 Jake Long T; 76 Steve McKinney G/C; 61 Shawn Murphy G; 68 Ike Ndukwe G; 73 Rueben Riley G; 64 Samson Satele C; 65 Justin Smiley G; 75 Matt Spanos C; 66 Donald Thomas G; Defensive linemen: 71 Lionel Dotson DE; 95 Jason Ferguson NT; 91 Vonnie Holliday DE; 70 Kendall Langford DE; 97 Phillip Merling DE; 98 Matt Roth DE; 96 Paul Soliai NT; 94 Randy Starks DE/NT; 62 Anthony Toribio NT; 90 Rodrique Wright DE	Linebackers: 56 Charlie Anderson OLB; 51 Akin Ayodele ILB; 57 Titus Brown OLB; 52 Channing Crowder ILB; 59 Junior Glymph OLB; 50 Edmond Miles ILB; 74 Quentin Moses OLB; 93 Rob Ninkovich OLB; 49 Kelly Poppinga ILB; 43 Keith Saunders OLB; 58 Kelvin Smith ILB; 53 Reggie Torbor ILB; Defensive backs: 32 Jason Allen FS/CB; 25 Will Allen CB; 35 Scorpio Babers CB; 37 Yeremiah Bell SS; 27 Will Billingsley CB/S; 47 Courtney Bryan SS; 20 Chris Crocker FS; 29 Travis Daniels CB; 28 Keith Davis SS; 21 André Goodman CB; 24 Renaldo Hill FS; 33 Nathan Jones CB; 41 Joey Thomas CB; Special teams: 1 Dan Carpenter K; 92 John Denney LS; 3 Jay Feely K; 2 Brandon Fields P	Reserve lists: 22 Michael Lehan CB (Active/PUP); -- Tab Perry WR (IR); 55 Joey Porter OLB (Active/PUP); rookies in italics

=== Final preseason roster ===
Miami Dolphins 2008 final preseason roster
Quarterbacks: 9 John Beck; 7 Chad Henne; 4 Josh McCown; 10 Chad Pennington; Running backs: 23 Ronnie Brown; 38 Patrick Cobbs; 46 Boomer Grigsby FB; 26 Lex Hilliard; 45 Reagan Mauia FB; 31 Jalen Parmele; 34 Ricky Williams; Wide receivers: 11 Anthony Armstrong; 15 Davone Bess; 83 Greg Camarillo; 14 Jayson Foster; 19 Ted Ginn Jr. KR/PR; 82 Derek Hagan; 18 Ernest Wilford; Tight ends: 80 Anthony Fasano; 88 David Martin; 48 Matthew Mulligan; 87 Justin Peelle; 89 Sean Ryan	Offensive linemen: 60 Michael Byrne C/G; 72 Vernon Carey T; 69 Trey Darilek OL; 67 Daren Heerspink T; 77 Jake Long T; 61 Shawn Murphy G; 68 Ike Ndukwe T/G; 64 Samson Satele C; 65 Justin Smiley G; 78 Pedro Sosa G/T; 75 Matt Spanos G/C; 66 Donald Thomas G; Defensive linemen: 71 Lionel Dotson DE; 95 Jason Ferguson NT; 91 Vonnie Holliday DE; 70 Kendall Langford DE; 97 Phillip Merling DE; 96 Paul Soliai NT; 94 Randy Starks DE; 62 Anthony Toribio NT; 90 Rodrique Wright DE	Linebackers: 56 Charlie Anderson OLB; 51 Akin Ayodele ILB; 57 Titus Brown OLB; 52 Channing Crowder ILB; 44 Maurice Fountain OLB; 59 Junior Glymph OLB; 50 Edmond Miles ILB; 74 Quentin Moses OLB; 93 Rob Ninkovich OLB; 49 Kelly Poppinga ILB; 55 Joey Porter OLB; 98 Matt Roth OLB/DE; 53 Reggie Torbor ILB; Defensive backs: 32 Jason Allen FS; 25 Will Allen CB; 37 Yeremiah Bell SS; 27 Will Billingsley CB; 47 Courtney Bryan SS; 20 Chris Crocker FS; 21 André Goodman CB; 24 Renaldo Hill FS; 33 Nathan Jones CB; 22 Michael Lehan CB; 41 Joey Thomas CB; Special teams: 5 Dan Carpenter K; 92 John Denney LS; 2 Brandon Fields P	Reserve lists: 80 Aaron Halterman TE (IR); -- Tab Perry WR (IR); 58 Kelvin Smith ILB (IR); rookies in italics

=== Roster moves ===
==== July ====
- 25 – Signed second-round pick defensive end Phillip Merling.
- 25 – Waived wide receiver Justin Wynn.
- 25 – Signed wide receiver Anthony Armstrong (Desperados).
- 26 – Placed linebacker Joey Porter on the Active/non-football injury list and cornerback Michael Lehan on the Active/PUP list.
- 26 – Waived offensive tackles Dan Gore and Julius Wilson.
- 28 – Activated linebacker Joey Porter (NFI).
- 28 – Signed second-round pick quarterback Chad Henne.
- 28 – Signed guard Rueben Riley (Panthers).
- 30 – Waived cornerback Scorpio Babers.
- 30 – Signed cornerback Chris Roberson (Jaguars).

==== August ====
- 2 – Waived/injured tight end Aaron Halterman and waived guard Rueben Riley.
- 4 – Placed tight end Aaron Halterman on injured reserve.
- 11 – Waived/injured linebacker Kelvin Smith.
- 11 – Signed quarterback Chad Pennington (Jets) and linebacker Maurice Fountain (Blaze)
- August 12 – Released placekicker Jay Feely.
- August 12 – Placed linebacker Kelvin Smith on injured reserve.
- August 15 – Waived linebacker Keith Saunders and wide receivers John Dunlap and Selwyn Lymon.
- August 18 – Released offensive lineman Steve McKinney.
- August 18 – Activated cornerback Michael Lehan (PUP).
- August 20 – Traded cornerback Travis Daniels to the Cleveland Browns in exchange for a seventh-round draft pick in the 2009 NFL draft.
- August 22 – Waived wide receiver David Kircus and cornerback Chris Roberson.
- August 25 – Signed undrafted free agent offensive tackle Pedro Sosa (Rutgers).
- August 27 – Released safety Keith Davis.
- August 30 – Traded quarterback Josh McCown to the Carolina Panthers in exchange for a seventh-round pick in the 2009 NFL draft.

==== Final cuts ====
On August 30, the Dolphins made 17 roster moves to reach the NFL's 53-player limit. The players released were:

- Cornerback Will Billingsley
- Linebacker Titus Brown
- Safety Courtney Bryan
- Center Michael Byrne
- Wide receiver Jayson Foster
- Linebacker Maurice Fountain
- Linebacker Junior Glymph
- Offensive tackle Daren Heerspink
- Running back Lex Hilliard
- Fullback Reagan Maui'a
- Linebacker Edmond Miles
- Tight end Matthew Mulligan
- Tight end Justin Peelle
- Linebacker Kelly Poppinga
- Guard Pedro Sosa
- Center Matt Spanos
- Defensive tackle Anthony Toribio

=== Preseason schedule ===
The Dolphins' 2008 preseason schedule was announced on April 3.

Week	Time*	Date	Opponent	Result	Record	Game site	TV	NFL.com Recap
1	7:30 PM EDT	August 9	Tampa Bay Buccaneers	L 17–6	0–1	Dolphin Stadium	WFOR	Recap
2	7:38 PM EDT	August 16	at Jacksonville Jaguars	W 19–14	1–1	Jacksonville Municipal Stadium	WFOR	Recap
3	7:30 PM EDT	August 23	Kansas City Chiefs	W 24–0	2–1	Dolphin Stadium	WFOR	Recap
4	8:00 PM EDT	August 28	at New Orleans Saints	W 14–10	3–1	Louisiana Superdome	WFOR	Recap

=== Preseason recap ===
After losing their preseason opener to the Tampa Bay Buccaneers, the Dolphins won their final three contests to finish the preseason 3–1.

Quarterback Chad Pennington was the Dolphins' most efficient passer of the preseason, leading the team in completion percentage (72.0) and passer rating (104.8). Rookie quarterback Chad Henne led the team in passing yards (351) but also in interceptions (2) while matching Pennington in passing touchdowns (1).

Running backs Ricky Williams and Jalen Parmele tied for the team lead in rushing yards at 123. Williams, Parmele and Ronnie Brown were the only Dolphins to rush for a touchdown during the preseason, scoring one each. Lex Hilliard and Patrick Cobbs finished fourth and fifth, respectively, on the team in rushing yards.

No Dolphins player surpassed 100 receiving yards during the preseason, though wide receiver Ted Ginn Jr. came closest at 97. He also tied rookie Davone Bess for the team lead in receptions with eight. Tight ends Anthony Fasano and Sean Ryan were the only Dolphins to catch a touchdown pass.

On special teams, rookie placekicker Dan Carpenter converted 7-of-8 field-goal attempts and all six extra-point attempts. Punter Brandon Fields punted 21 times for a 44.1-yard average and two touchbacks. Meanwhile, Davone Bess led the team in punt returns (6) but Ted Ginn Jr. was the only Dolphins player to return a kick or punt for a touchdown. Patrick Cobbs led the team in kick return yards with 106.

On defense, Linebackers Akin Ayodele and Reggie Torbor tied for the team lead with 17 tackles, while Ayodele led the team in solo stops with 12. Five others – Yeremiah Bell, Channing Crowder, Renaldo Hill, Nathan Jones, Edmond Miles – also reached double-digits in tackles.

Four players – Jason Allen, Renaldo Hill, Michael Lehan, Joey Thomas – recorded an interception during the preseason. The Dolphins also totaled 14 quarterbacks sacks during the preseason. Linebacker Rob Ninkovich and defensive end Randy Starks each record a team-high two sacks, while ten other players each recorded a sack apiece. Channing Crowder, Junior Glymph and Paul Soliai each forced a fumble during the preseason.

== Regular season ==
=== Schedule ===
The Dolphins' 2008 regular season schedule was released on April 15, 2008.

Week	Date	Opponent	Result	Record	Venue	Recap
1	September 7	**New York Jets**	**L** 14–20	0–1	Dolphin Stadium	Recap
2	September 14	at Arizona Cardinals	**L** 10–31	0–2	University of Phoenix Stadium	Recap
3	September 21	at **New England Patriots**	**W** 38–13	1–2	Gillette Stadium	Recap
4	Bye					
5	October 5	San Diego Chargers	**W** 17–10	2–2	Dolphin Stadium	Recap
6	October 12	at Houston Texans	**L** 28–29	2–3	Reliant Stadium	Recap
7	October 19	Baltimore Ravens	**L** 13–27	2–4	Dolphin Stadium	Recap
8	October 26	**Buffalo Bills**	**W** 25–16	3–4	Dolphin Stadium	Recap
9	November 2	at Denver Broncos	**W** 26–17	4–4	INVESCO Field at Mile High	Recap
10	November 9	Seattle Seahawks	**W** 21–19	5–4	Dolphin Stadium	Recap
11	November 16	Oakland Raiders	**W** 17–15	6–4	Dolphin Stadium	Recap
12	November 23	**New England Patriots**	**L** 28–48	6–5	Dolphin Stadium	Recap
13	November 30	at St. Louis Rams	**W** 16–12	7–5	Edward Jones Dome	Recap
14	December 7	at **Buffalo Bills**	**W** 16–3	8–5	(Canada) Rogers Centre (Toronto)	Recap
15	December 14	San Francisco 49ers	**W** 14–9	9–5	Dolphin Stadium	Recap
16	December 21	at Kansas City Chiefs	**W** 38–31	10–5	Arrowhead Stadium	Recap
17	December 28	at **New York Jets**	**W** 24–17	11–5	The Meadowlands	Recap

Note: Intra-division opponents are in bold text.

=== Standings ===
AFC East
	W	L	T	PCT	DIV	CONF	PF	PA	STK
^{(3)} Miami Dolphins	11	5	0	.688	4–2	8–4	345	317	W5
New England Patriots	11	5	0	.688	4–2	7–5	410	309	W4
New York Jets	9	7	0	.563	4–2	7–5	405	356	L2
Buffalo Bills	7	9	0	.438	0–6	5–7	336	342	L1

=== Opening day roster ===
Miami Dolphins 2008 opening day roster
**Quarterbacks**: 9 John Beck; 7 Chad Henne; 10 Chad Pennington; **Running backs**: 23 Ronnie Brown; 38 Patrick Cobbs; 46 Boomer Grigsby FB; 31 Jalen Parmele; 34 Ricky Williams; **Wide receivers**: 15 Davone Bess; 83 Greg Camarillo; 19 Ted Ginn Jr. KR/PR; 82 Derek Hagan; 17 Brandon London; 18 Ernest Wilford; **Tight ends**: 80 Anthony Fasano; 88 David Martin; 89 Sean Ryan	**Offensive linemen**: 57 Andy Alleman C/G; 72 Vernon Carey T; 75 Nate Garner T; 77 Jake Long T; 61 Shawn Murphy G; 68 Ike Ndukwe T/G; 64 Samson Satele C; 65 Justin Smiley G; 66 Donald Thomas G; **Defensive linemen**: 71 Lionel Dotson DE; 95 Jason Ferguson NT; 91 Vonnie Holliday DE; 70 Kendall Langford DE; 97 Phillip Merling DE; 96 Paul Soliai NT; 94 Randy Starks DE/NT; 90 Rodrique Wright DE	**Linebackers**: 56 Charlie Anderson OLB/DE; 51 Akin Ayodele ILB; 52 Channing Crowder ILB; 74 Quentin Moses OLB/DE; 55 Joey Porter OLB/DE; 98 Matt Roth OLB; 53 Reggie Torbor ILB; **Defensive backs**: 32 Jason Allen FS/CB; 25 Will Allen CB; 37 Yeremiah Bell SS; 20 Chris Crocker FS; 29 Tyrone Culver FS; 21 André Goodman CB; 24 Renaldo Hill S; 33 Nate Jones CB; 22 Michael Lehan CB; **Special teams**: 5 Dan Carpenter K; 92 John Denney LS; 2 Brandon Fields P	**Reserve lists**: -- Aaron Halterman TE (IR); -- Tab Perry WR (IR); -- Kelvin Smith ILB (IR); **Practice squad**: 11 Anthony Armstrong WR; 27 Will Billingsley CB; 67 Daren Heerspink OT; 26 Lex Hilliard RB; 48 Matthew Mulligan TE; 93 Rob Ninkovich OLB; 58 Tyson Smith ILB; 62 Anthony Toribio NT; rookies in italics

=== Final roster ===
Miami Dolphins 2008 final roster
**Quarterbacks**: 9 John Beck; 7 Chad Henne; 10 Chad Pennington; **Running backs**: 23 Ronnie Brown; 38 Patrick Cobbs KR; 36 Lousaka Polite FB; 34 Ricky Williams; **Wide receivers**: 15 Davone Bess KR/PR; 19 Ted Ginn Jr. KR/PR; 17 Brandon London; 18 Ernest Wilford; **Tight ends**: 80 Anthony Fasano; 81 Joey Haynos; 88 David Martin	**Offensive linemen**: 57 Andy Alleman G; 72 Vernon Carey T; 76 Brandon Frye T; 75 Nate Garner T; 60 Al Johnson C; 77 Jake Long T; 61 Shawn Murphy G; 68 Ikechuku Ndukwe G; 64 Samson Satele C; **Defensive linemen**: 71 Lionel Dotson DE; 95 Jason Ferguson NT; 91 Vonnie Holliday DE; 70 Kendall Langford DE; 97 Phillip Merling DE; 74 Quentin Moses DE; 96 Paul Soliai NT; 94 Randy Starks NT; 90 Rodrique Wright DE	**Linebackers**: 56 Charlie Anderson OLB; 51 Akin Ayodele ILB; 52 Channing Crowder ILB; 58 William Kershaw ILB; 55 Joey Porter OLB; 98 Matt Roth OLB; 59 Derek Smith ILB; 53 Reggie Torbor ILB; 50 Erik Walden OLB; **Defensive backs**: 32 Jason Allen CB/S; 25 Will Allen CB; 37 Yeremiah Bell SS; 47 Courtney Bryan FS; 29 Tyrone Culver SS; 21 André Goodman CB; 24 Renaldo Hill FS; 33 Nate Jones CB; 41 Joey Thomas CB; **Special teams**: 5 Dan Carpenter K; 92 John Denney LS; 2 Brandon Fields P	**Reserve lists**: 83 Greg Camarillo WR (IR); -- Aaron Halterman TE (IR); -- Matt McChesney G (IR); -- Tab Perry WR (IR); 65 Justin Smiley G (IR); -- Kelvin Smith LB (IR); 66 Donald Thomas G (IR); **Practice squad**: 11 Anthony Armstrong WR; 35 Scorpio Babers CB; 27 Will Billingsley CB; 20 Chris Brown FB; 62 Joe Cohen NT; 67 Daren Heerspink T; 26 Lex Hilliard RB; 16 Todd Lowber WR; rookies in italics 53 active, 7 inactive, 8 practice squad

=== Game summaries ===
==== Week 1: vs. New York Jets ====
Week One: New York Jets at Miami Dolphins

Quarter	1	2	3	4	Total
**Jets**	7	6	7	0	**20**
Dolphins	0	7	0	7	**14**

at Dolphin Stadium, Miami Gardens, Florida

- Date: September 7
- Game time: 1:00 p.m. EDT
- Game weather: 88 °F (31 °C), mostly sunny
- Game attendance: 65,859
- Referee: Mike Carey
- TV announcers (CBS): Jim Nantz & Phil Simms

Game information

**First quarter**

- NYJ – Jerricho Cotchery 56-yard pass from Brett Favre (Mike Nugent kick), 8:42. Jets 7–0. **Drive: 1 play, 56 yards, 0:10.**

**Second quarter**

- MIA – Anthony Fasano 5-yard pass from Chad Pennington (Dan Carpenter kick), 12:41. Tied 7–7. **Drive: 11 plays, 78 yards, 5:50.**
- NYJ – Chansi Stuckey 22-yard pass from Brett Favre (pass failed), 6:52. Jets 13–7. **Drive: 11 plays, 60 yards, 5:49.**

**Third quarter**

- NYJ – Thomas Jones 6-yard run (Mike Nugent kick), 1:08. Jets 20–7. **Drive: 9 plays, 69 yards, 5:51.**

**Fourth quarter**

- MIA – David Martin 11-yard pass from Chad Pennington (Dan Carpenter kick), 3:27. Jets 20–14. **Drive: 8 plays, 54 yards, 3:21.**

**Top passers**

- NYJ – Brett Favre – 15/22, 194 yards, 2 TD
- MIA – Chad Pennington – 26/43, 251 yards, 2 TD, INT

**Top rushers**

- NYJ – Thomas Jones – 22 rushes, 101 yards, TD
- MIA – Ricky Williams – 10 rushes, 24 yards

**Top receivers**

- NYJ – Jerricho Cotchery – 3 receptions, 80 yards, TD
- MIA – Anthony Fasano – 8 receptions, 84 yards, TD

==== Week 2: at Arizona Cardinals ====
Week Two: Miami Dolphins at Arizona Cardinals

Quarter	1	2	3	4	Total
Dolphins	0	0	3	7	**10**
**Cardinals**	14	3	14	0	**31**

at University of Phoenix Stadium, Glendale, Arizona

- Date: September 14
- Game time: 4:15 p.m. EDT / 1:15 p.m. MST
- Game weather: None (retractable roof closed)
- Game attendance: 63,445
- Referee: Carl Cheffers
- TV announcers (CBS): Bill Macatee & Steve Beuerlein

Game information

**First quarter**

- ARI – Anquan Boldin 79-yard pass from Kurt Warner (Neil Rackers kick), 12:20. Cardinals 7–0. **Drive: 1 play, 69 yards, 0:29.**
- ARI – Anquan Boldin 3-yard pass from Kurt Warner (Neil Rackers kick), 5:40. Cardinals 14–0. **Drive: 8 plays, 94 yards, 4:19.**

**Second quarter**

- ARI – Neil Rackers 45-yard field goal, 8:46. Cardinals 17–0. **Drive: 11 plays, 60 yards, 6:42.**

**Third quarter**

- ARI – Tim Hightower 1-yard run (Neil Rackers kick), 10:29. Cardinals 24–0. **Drive: 10 plays, 69 yards, 4:31.**
- MIA – Dan Carpenter 32-yard field goal, 5:26. Cardinals 24–3. **Drive: 11 plays, 58 yards, 5:03.**
- ARI – Anquan Boldin 8-yard pass from Kurt Warner (Neil Rackers kick), 1:27. Cardinals 31–3. **Drive: 8 plays, 81 yards, 3:59.**

**Fourth quarter**

- MIA – Ronnie Brown 1-yard run (Dan Carpenter kick), 2:38. Cardinals 31–10. **Drive: 18 plays, 90 yards, 7:04.**

**Top passers**

- MIA – Chad Pennington – 10/20, 112 yards
- ARI – Kurt Warner – 19/24, 361 yards, 3 TD

**Top rushers**

- MIA – Ricky Williams – 11 rushes, 28 yards
- ARI – Edgerrin James – 18 rushes, 55 yards

**Top receivers**

- MIA – Derek Hagan – 3 receptions, 51 yards
- ARI – Larry Fitzgerald – 6 receptions, 153 yards

==== Week 3: at New England Patriots ====
Week Three: Miami Dolphins at New England Patriots

Quarter	1	2	3	4	Total
**Dolphins**	7	14	7	10	**38**
Patriots	0	6	7	0	**13**

at Gillette Stadium, Foxborough, Massachusetts

- Date: September 21
- Game time: 1:00 p.m. EDT
- Game weather: 72 °F (22 °C), sunny
- Game attendance: 68,756
- Referee: Bill Carollo
- TV announcers (CBS): Ian Eagle & Solomon Wilcots

Game information

**First quarter**

- MIA – Ronnie Brown 2-yard run (Dan Carpenter kick), 2:29. Dolphins 7–0. **Drive: 8 plays, 74 yards, 3:44.**

**Second quarter**

- NE – Stephen Gostkowski 37-yard field goal, 11:31. Dolphins 7–3. **Drive: 13 plays, 56 yards, 5:58.**
- MIA – Ronnie Brown 15-yard run (Dan Carpenter kick), 8:19. Dolphins 14–3. **Drive: 6 plays, 79 yards, 3:12.**
- NE – Stephen Gostkowski 44-yard field goal, 4:54. Dolphins 14–6. **Drive: 8 plays, 40 yards, 3:25.**
- MIA – Ronnie Brown 5-yard run (Dan Carpenter kick), 0:59. Dolphins 21–6. **Drive: 9 plays, 77 yards, 3:50.**

**Third quarter**

- MIA – Anthony Fasano 19-yard pass from Ronnie Brown (Dan Carpenter kick), 5:46. Dolphins 28–6. **Drive: 10 plays, 79 yards, 6:25.**
- NE – Jabar Gaffney 5-yard pass from Matt Cassel (Stephen Gostkowski kick), 3:20. Dolphins 28–13. **Drive: 7 plays, 23 yards, 2:26.**

**Fourth quarter**

- MIA – Ronnie Brown 62-yard run (Dan Carpenter kick), 14:49. Dolphins 35–13. **Drive: 6 plays, 23 yards, 3:31.**
- MIA – Dan Carpenter 39-yard field goal, 6:08. Dolphins 38–13. **Drive: 7 plays, 41 yards, 4:34.**

**Top passers**

- MIA – Chad Pennington – 17/20, 226 yards
- NE – Matt Cassel – 19/31, 131 yards, TD, INT

**Top rushers**

- MIA – Ronnie Brown – 17 rushes, 113 yards, 4 TD
- NE – Sammy Morris – 9 rushes, 27 yards

**Top receivers**

- MIA – Anthony Fasano – 3 receptions, 66 yards, TD
- NE – Wes Welker – 6 receptions, 55 yards

In this game, the Dolphins tested a new offensive formation concocted by quarterbacks coach David Lee, in which running backs Ricky Williams and Ronnie Brown were on the field at the same time. It later became known as the Wildcat. Brown would take direct snaps and keep it himself or hand it to Williams. The Patriots came in with a 21-game regular season winning streak and had the home field advantage against a Dolphins team which sported a 1–17 record since the start of the previous season. As such, they were 12.5 point favorites. In an absolute shocker, the Dolphins decimated the Patriots for a 38–13 victory. This was their last road win over New England until 2019.

==== Week 5: vs. San Diego Chargers ====
Week Five: San Diego Chargers at Miami Dolphins

Quarter	1	2	3	4	Total
Chargers	3	0	7	0	**10**
**Dolphins**	3	14	0	0	**17**

at Dolphin Stadium, Miami Gardens, Florida

- Date: October 5
- Game time: 1:00 p.m. EDT
- Game weather: 86 °F (30 °C), partly cloudy
- Game attendance: 65,063
- Referee: Walt Coleman
- TV announcers (CBS): Gus Johnson & Steve Tasker

Game information

**First quarter**

- SD – Nate Kaeding 34-yard field goal, 7:42. Chargers 3–0. **Drive: 14 plays, 61 yards, 7:18.**
- MIA – Dan Carpenter 47-yard field goal, 2:48. Tied 3–3. **Drive: 9 plays, 44 yards, 4:54.**

**Second quarter**

- MIA – Greg Camarillo 17-yard pass from Chad Pennington (Dan Carpenter kick), 5:25. Dolphins 10–3. **Drive: 9 plays, 65 yards, 5:13.**
- MIA – Ronnie Brown 5-yard run (Dan Carpenter kick), 0:41. Dolphins 17–3. **Drive: 11 plays, 79 yards, 3:40.**

**Third quarter**

- SD – Chris Chambers 17-yard pass from Philip Rivers (Nate Kaeding kick), 3:13. Dolphins 17–10. **Drive: 7 plays, 68 yards, 2:52.**

**Fourth quarter**

- No scoring plays

**Top passers**

- SD – Philip Rivers – 13/28, 159 yards, TD
- MIA – Chad Pennington – 22/29, 228 yards, TD

**Top rushers**

- SD – LaDainian Tomlinson – 12 rushes, 35 yards
- MIA – Ronnie Brown – 24 rushes, 125 yards, TD

**Top receivers**

- SD – Vincent Jackson – 2 receptions, 56 yards
- MIA – Greg Camarillo – 6 receptions, 68 yards, TD

==== Week 6: at Houston Texans ====
Week Six: Miami Dolphins at Houston Texans

Quarter	1	2	3	4	Total
Dolphins	7	7	7	7	**28**
**Texans**	3	10	7	9	**29**

at Reliant Stadium, Houston, Texas

- Date: October 12
- Game time: 1:00 p.m. EST / 12:00 p.m. CDT
- Game weather: 79 °F (26 °C), cloudy (retractable roof open)
- Game attendance: 70,023
- Referee: Ed Hochuli
- TV announcers (CBS): Ian Eagle & Solomon Wilcots

Game information

**First quarter**

- MIA – Patrick Cobbs 53-yard pass from Chad Pennington (Dan Carpenter kick), 6:08. Dolphins 7–0. **Drive: 2 plays, 55 yards, 0:51.**
- HOU – Kris Brown 27-yard field goal, 1:02. Dolphins 7–3. **Drive: 10 plays, 61 yards, 5:06.**

**Second quarter**

- MIA – Patrick Cobbs 80-yard pass from Chad Pennington (Dan Carpenter kick), 11:37. Dolphins 14–3. **Drive: 2 plays, 80 yards, 0:21.**
- HOU – Kris Brown 33-yard field goal, 9:07. Dolphins 14–6. **Drive: 6 plays, 27 yards, 2:30.**
- HOU – Jacoby Jones 70-yard punt return (Kris Brown kick), 5:24. Dolphins 14–13.

**Third quarter**

- HOU – Andre Johnson 12-yard pass from Matt Schaub (Kris Brown kick), 10:00. Texans 20–14. **Drive: 5 plays, 78 yards, 3:01.**
- MIA – Ricky Williams 5-yard run (Dan Carpenter kick), 6:18. Dolphins 21–20. **Drive: 6 plays, 73 yards, 3:42.**

**Fourth quarter**

- HOU – Kris Brown 42-yard field goal, 6:04. Texans 23–21. **Drive: 8 plays, 56 yards, 3:39.**
- MIA – Ronnie Brown 6-yard run (Dan Carpenter kick), 1:45. Dolphins 28–23. **Drive: 12 plays, 76 yards, 1:42.**
- HOU – Matt Schaub 3-yard run (run failed), 0:03. Texans 29–28. **Drive: 12 plays, 76 yards, 1:42.**

**Top passers**

- MIA – Chad Pennington – 19/25, 284 yards, 2 TD, INT
- HOU – Matt Schaub – 22/42, 379 yards, TD, 2 INT

**Top rushers**

- MIA – Ronnie Brown – 13 rushes, 50 yards, TD
- HOU – Steve Slaton – 15 rushes, 58 yards

**Top receivers**

- MIA – Patrick Cobbs – 3 receptions, 138 yards, 2 TD
- HOU – Andre Johnson – 10 receptions, 178 yards, TD

==== Week 7: vs. Baltimore Ravens ====
Week Seven: Baltimore Ravens at Miami Dolphins

Quarter	1	2	3	4	Total
**Ravens**	3	14	3	7	**27**
Dolphins	3	3	7	0	**13**

at Dolphin Stadium, Miami Gardens, Florida

- Date: October 19
- Game time: 1:00 p.m. EDT
- Game weather: 80 °F (27 °C), partly cloudy
- Game attendance: 64,972
- Referee: Bill Leavy
- TV announcers (CBS): Bill Macatee & Steve Beuerlein

Game information

**First quarter**

- MIA – Dan Carpenter 21-yard field goal, 8:23. Dolphins 3–0. **Drive: 11 plays, 54 yards, 6:37.**
- BAL – Matt Stover 47-yard field goal, 1:31. Tied 3–3. **Drive: 12 plays, 42 yards, 6:52.**

**Second quarter**

- BAL – Terrell Suggs 44-yard interception return (Matt Stover kick), 8:44. Ravens 10–3.
- MIA – Dan Carpenter 26-yard field goal, 4:31. Ravens 10–6. **Drive: 8 plays, 51 yards, 4:13.**
- BAL – Derrick Mason 11-yard pass from Joe Flacco (Matt Stover kick), 0:30. Ravens 17–6. **Drive: 11 plays, 67 yards, 4:01.**

**Third quarter**

- BAL – Matt Stover 28-yard field goal, 8:32. Ravens 20–6. **Drive: 13 plays, 67 yards, 6:28.**
- MIA – Davone Bess 7-yard pass from Chad Pennington (Dan Carpenter kick), 4:56. Ravens 20–13. **Drive: 6 plays, 74 yards, 3:36.**

**Fourth quarter**

- BAL – Willis McGahee 5-yard run (Matt Stover kick), 6:28. Ravens 27–13. **Drive: 9 plays, 63 yards, 4:37.**

**Top passers**

- BAL – Joe Flacco – 17/23, 232 yards, TD
- MIA – Chad Pennington – 24/35, 295 yards, TD, INT

**Top rushers**

- BAL – Willis McGahee – 19 rushes, 105 yards, TD
- MIA – Ronnie Brown – 13 rushes, 27 yards

**Top receivers**

- BAL – Derrick Mason – 6 receptions, 87 yards, TD
- MIA – Greg Camarillo – 6 receptions, 74 yards

==== Week 8: vs. Buffalo Bills ====
Week Eight: Buffalo Bills at Miami Dolphins

Quarter	1	2	3	4	Total
Bills	3	6	7	0	**16**
**Dolphins**	7	0	10	8	**25**

at Dolphin Stadium, Miami Gardens, Florida

- Date: October 26
- Game time: 1:00 p.m. EST
- Game weather: 78 °F (26 °C), cloudy
- Game attendance: 65,011
- Referee: Walt Anderson
- TV announcers (CBS): Kevin Harlan & Rich Gannon

Game information

**First quarter**

- MIA – Anthony Fasano 2-yard pass from Chad Pennington (Dan Carpenter kick), 9:26. Dolphins 7–0. **Drive: 9 plays, 81 yards, 5:34.**
- BUF – Rian Lindell 19-yard field goal, 4:21. Dolphins 7–3. **Drive: 9 plays, 62 yards, 5:05.**

**Second quarter**

- BUF – Rian Lindell 43-yard field goal, 8:19. Dolphins 7–6. **Drive: 9 plays, 32 yards, 4:13.**
- BUF – Rian Lindell 47-yard field goal, 0:00. Bills 9–7. **Drive: 8 plays, 35 yards, 1:38.**

**Third quarter**

- BUF – Marshawn Lynch 8-yard run (Rian Lindell kick), 10:17. Bills 16–7. **Drive: 8 plays, 60 yards, 4:43.**
- MIA – Dan Carpenter 43-yard field goal, 7:56. Bills 16–10. **Drive: 5 plays, 55 yards, 2:21.**
- MIA – Ricky Williams 3-yard run (Dan Carpenter kick), 1:15. Dolphins 17–16. **Drive: 8 plays, 69 yards, 4:41.**

**Fourth quarter**

- MIA – Dan Carpenter 45-yard field goal, 13:17. Dolphins 20–16. **Drive: 4 plays, 7 yards, 1:29.**
- MIA – Duke Preston tackled in end zone by Charlie Anderson, 7:40. Dolphins 22–16.
- MIA – Dan Carpenter 35-yard field goal, 3:53. Dolphins 25–16. **Drive: 8 plays, 29 yards, 3:47.**

**Top passers**

- BUF – Trent Edwards – 21/35, 227 yards, INT
- MIA – Chad Pennington – 22/30, 314 yards, TD

**Top rushers**

- BUF – Marshawn Lynch – 13 rushes, 61 yards, TD
- MIA – Ronnie Brown – 14 rushes, 43 yards

**Top receivers**

- BUF – Lee Evans – 7 receptions, 116 yards
- MIA – Ted Ginn Jr. – 7 receptions, 175 yards

==== Week 9: at Denver Broncos ====
Week Nine: Miami Dolphins at Denver Broncos

Quarter	1	2	3	4	Total
**Dolphins**	13	3	0	10	**26**
Broncos	7	0	3	7	**17**

at Invesco Field at Mile High, Denver, Colorado

- Date: November 2
- Game time: 4:05 p.m. EST / 2:05 p.m. MST
- Game weather: 77 °F (25 °C), partly cloudy
- Game attendance: 75,499
- Referee: Tony Corrente
- TV announcers (CBS): Greg Gumbel & Dan Dierdorf

Game information

**First quarter**

- MIA – Dan Carpenter 45-yard field goal, 11:34. Dolphins 3–0. **Drive: 4 plays, 7 yards, 2:06.**
- MIA – Dan Carpenter 47-yard field goal, 5:56. Dolphins 6–0. **Drive: 10 plays, 50 yards, 4:42.**
- MIA – Will Allen 32-yard interception return (Dan Carpenter kick), 4:58. Dolphins 13–0.
- DEN – Eddie Royal 2-yard pass from Jay Cutler (Matt Prater kick), 3:50. Dolphins 13–7. **Drive: 3 plays, 5 yards, 1:08.**

**Second quarter**

- MIA – Dan Carpenter 23-yard field goal, 0:02. Dolphins 16–7. **Drive: 14 plays, 88 yards, 4:52.**

**Third quarter**

- DEN – Matt Prater 50-yard field goal, 8:11. Dolphins 16–10. **Drive: 12 plays, 65 yards, 5:40.**

**Fourth quarter**

- MIA – Dan Carpenter 41-yard field goal, 11:58. Dolphins 19–10. **Drive: 6 plays, 20 yards, 2:53.**
- DEN – Peyton Hillis 1-yard pass from Jay Cutler (Matt Prater kick), 11:10. Dolphins 19–17. **Drive: 3 plays, 80 yards, 0:48.**
- MIA – Ronnie Brown 2-yard run (Dan Carpenter kick), 3:08. Dolphins 26–17. **Drive: 15 plays, 80 yards, 8:02.**

**Top passers**

- MIA – Chad Pennington – 23/40, 281 yards, INT
- DEN – Jay Cutler – 24/46, 307 yards, 2 TD, 3 INT

**Top rushers**

- MIA – Ronnie Brown – 20 rushes, 59 yards, TD
- DEN – Andre Hall – 1 rush, 7 yards

**Top receivers**

- MIA – Greg Camarillo – 11 receptions, 111 yards
- DEN – Peyton Hillis – 7 receptions, 116 yards, TD

==== Week 10: vs. Seattle Seahawks ====
Week Ten: Seattle Seahawks at Miami Dolphins

Quarter	1	2	3	4	Total
Seahawks	0	7	6	6	**19**
**Dolphins**	7	7	0	7	**21**

at Dolphin Stadium, Miami Gardens, Florida

- Date: November 9
- Game time: 1:00 p.m. EST
- Game weather: 84 °F (29 °C), partly cloudy
- Game attendance: 64,862
- Referee: Peter Morelli
- TV announcers (Fox): Sam Rosen, Tim Ryan, & Chris Myers

Game information

**First quarter**

- MIA – Ted Ginn Jr. 39-yard pass from Chad Pennington (Dan Carpenter kick), 8:50. Dolphins 7–0. **Drive: 11 plays, 90 yards, 6:10.**

**Second quarter**

- MIA – Ricky Williams 51-yard run (Dan Carpenter kick), 14:52. Dolphins 14–0. **Drive: 6 plays, 76 yards, 2:59.**
- SEA – Jordan Babineaux 35-yard interception return (Olindo Mare kick), 8:21. Dolphins 14–7.

**Third quarter**

- SEA – Olindo Mare 37-yard field goal, 11:06. Dolphins 14–10. **Drive: 9 plays, 31 yards, 3:54.**
- SEA – Olindo Mare 27-yard field goal, 3:31. Dolphins 14–13. **Drive: 9 plays, 48 yards, 4:14.**

**Fourth quarter**

- MIA – Ronnie Brown 16-yard run (Dan Carpenter kick), 5:38. Dolphins 21–13. **Drive: 16 plays, 79 yards, 9:06.**
- SEA – Koren Robinson 3-yard pass from Seneca Wallace (pass failed), 2:57. Dolphins 21–19. **Drive: 6 plays, 55 yards, 2:41.**

**Top passers**

- SEA – Seneca Wallace – 21/38, 185 yards, TD
- MIA – Chad Pennington – 22/36, 209 yards, TD, INT

**Top rushers**

- SEA – Julius Jones – 16 rushes, 88 yards
- MIA – Ricky Williams – 12 rushes, 105 yards, TD

**Top receivers**

- SEA – Bobby Engram – 5 receptions, 63 yards
- MIA – Ted Ginn Jr. – 4 receptions, 67 yards, TD

==== Week 11: vs. Oakland Raiders ====
Week Eleven: Oakland Raiders at Miami Dolphins

Quarter	1	2	3	4	Total
Raiders	0	3	2	10	**15**
**Dolphins**	7	0	7	3	**17**

at Dolphin Stadium, Miami Gardens, Florida

- Date: November 16
- Game time: 1:00 p.m. EST
- Game weather: 67 °F (19 °C), sunny
- Game attendance: 65,113
- Referee: Ed Hochuli
- TV announcers (CBS): Ian Eagle & Solomon Wilcots

Game information

**First quarter**

- MIA – Ted Ginn Jr. 40-yard run (Dan Carpenter kick), 6:52. Dolphins 7–0. **Drive: 9 plays, 93 yards, 5:51.**

**Second quarter**

- OAK – Sebastian Janikowski 21-yard field goal, 1:09. Dolphins 7–3. **Drive: 8 plays, 77 yards, 4:49.**

**Third quarter**

- OAK – Chad Pennington sacked in end zone by Jay Richardson, 10:28. Dolphins 7–5.
- MIA – Patrick Cobbs 10-yard run (Dan Carpenter kick), 1:57. Dolphins 14–5. **Drive: 9 plays, 64 yards, 3:55.**

**Fourth quarter**

- OAK – Sebastian Janikowski 37-yard field goal, 8:02. Dolphins 14–8. **Drive: 10 plays, 73 yards, 4:06.**
- OAK – Johnnie Lee Higgins 93-yard punt return (Sebastian Janikowski kick), 4:30. Raiders 15–14.
- MIA – Dan Carpenter 38-yard field goal, 0:38. Dolphins 17–15. **Drive: 10 plays, 61 yards, 3:52.**

**Top passers**

- OAK – JaMarcus Russell – 15/22, 156 yards
- MIA – Chad Pennington – 16/22, 174 yards

**Top rushers**

- OAK – Justin Fargas – 17 rushes, 57 yards
- MIA – Ronnie Brown – 16 rushes, 101 yards

**Top receivers**

- OAK – Ronald Curry – 6 receptions, 73 yards
- MIA – Ted Ginn Jr. – 4 receptions, 51 yards

==== Week 12: vs. New England Patriots ====
Week Twelve: New England Patriots at Miami Dolphins

Quarter	1	2	3	4	Total
**Patriots**	3	14	14	17	**48**
Dolphins	7	7	7	7	**28**

at Dolphin Stadium, Miami Gardens, Florida

- Date: November 23
- Game time: 1:00 p.m. EST
- Game weather: 73 °F (23 °C), partly cloudy
- Game attendance: 67,176
- Referee: Alberto Riveron
- TV announcers (CBS): Greg Gumbel (play-by-play) and Dan Dierdorf (color commentator)

Game information

**First quarter**

- NE – Stephen Gostkowski 30-yard field goal, 10:08. Patriots 3–0. **Drive: 8 plays, 48 yards, 4:52.**
- MIA – Greg Camarillo 3-yard pass from Chad Pennington (Dan Carpenter kick), 5:23. 'Dolphins 7–3. **Drive: 4 plays, 33 yards, 1:48.**

**Second quarter**

- NE – Matt Cassel 8-yard run (Stephen Gostkowski kick), 14:54. Patriots 10–7. **Drive: 12 plays, 74 yards, 5:29.**
- MIA – Chad Pennington 7-yard run (Dan Carpenter kick), 5:05. Dolphins 14–10. **Drive: 12 plays, 72 yards, 7:12.**
- NE – Randy Moss 25-yard pass from Matt Cassel (Stephen Gostkowski kick), 2:14. Patriots 17–14. **Drive: 6 plays, 63 yards, 2:51.**

**Third quarter**

- MIA – Casey Cramer 2-yard pass from Chad Pennington (Dan Carpenter kick), 11:28. Dolphins 21–17. **Drive: 7 plays, 82 yards, 3:32.**
- NE – Randy Moss 8-yard pass from Matt Cassel (Stephen Gostkowski kick), 6:12. Patriots 24–21. **Drive: 11 plays, 78 yards, 5:16.**
- NE – Kevin Faulk 21-yard run (Stephen Gostkowski kick), 0:00. Patriots 31–21. **Drive: 4 plays, 87 yards, 1:30.**

**Fourth quarter**

- MIA – Ricky Williams 13-yard pass from Chad Pennington (Dan Carpenter kick), 13:11. Patriots 31–28. **Drive: 5 plays, 69 yards, 1:49.**
- NE – Randy Moss 29-yard pass from Matt Cassel (Stephen Gostkowski kick), 8:52. Patriots 38–28. **Drive: 9 plays, 80 yards, 4:19.**
- NE – Stephen Gostkowski 30-yard field goal, 7:08. Patriots 41–28. **Drive: 4 plays, 5 yards, 1:27.**
- NE – BenJarvus Green-Ellis 1-yard run (Stephen Gostkowski kick), 0:37. Patriots 48–28. **Drive: 7 plays, 40 yards, 3:27.**

**Top passers**

- NE – Matt Cassel – 30/43, 415 yards, 3 TD, INT
- MIA – Chad Pennington – 24/41, 341 yards, 3 TD, INT

**Top rushers**

- NE – Kevin Faulk – 8 rushes, 53 yards, TD
- MIA – Ronnie Brown – 10 rushes, 37 yards

**Top receivers**

- NE – Randy Moss – 8 receptions, 125 yards, 3 TD
- MIA – Ted Ginn Jr. – 5 receptions, 88 yards

A week after a 400-yard passing game against the Jets, Matt Cassel threw for 415 yards and three touchdowns for the Patriots, while Chad Pennington threw for 345 yards and two scores; both quarterbacks also ran in a touchdown. The Dolphins offense was limited to 27 yards as the Patriots broke open a tight game in the fourth quarter, winning 48–28.

==== Week 13: at St. Louis Rams ====
Week Thirteen: Miami Dolphins at St. Louis Rams

Quarter	1	2	3	4	Total
**Dolphins**	0	10	3	3	**16**
Rams	6	3	0	3	**12**

at Edward Jones Dome, St. Louis, Missouri

- Date: November 30
- Game time: 1:00 p.m. EST / 12:00 p.m. CST
- Game weather: None (played indoors)
- Game attendance: 61,046
- Referee: Ron Winter
- TV announcers (CBS): Gus Johnson & Steve Tasker

Game information

**First quarter**

- STL – Josh Brown 23-yard field goal, 10:49. Rams 3–0. **Drive: 9 plays, 72 yards, 4:11.**
- STL – Josh Brown 51-yard field goal, 1:45. Rams 6–0. **Drive: 12 plays, 47 yards, 5:31.**

**Second quarter**

- MIA – Ronnie Brown 3-yard run (Dan Carpenter kick), 10:59. Dolphins 7–6. **Drive: 12 plays, 88 yards, 5:46.**
- STL – Josh Brown 33-yard field goal, 1:51. Rams 9–7. **Drive: 14 plays, 51 yards, 6:22.**
- MIA – Dan Carpenter 37-yard field goal, 0:00. Dolphins 10–9. **Drive: 10 plays, 19 yards, 1:51.**

**Third quarter**

- MIA – Dan Carpenter 47-yard field goal, 6:10. Dolphins 13–9. **Drive: 8 plays, 58 yards, 4:36.**

**Fourth quarter**

- STL – Josh Brown 38-yard field goal, 12:14. Dolphins 13–12. **Drive: 10 plays, 43 yards, 4:14.**
- MIA – Dan Carpenter 42-yard field goal, 6:39. Dolphins 16–12. **Drive: 6 plays, 16 yards, 3:25.**

**Top passers**

- MIA – Chad Pennington – 13/23, 166 yards
- STL – Marc Bulger – 16/35, 149 yards, 3 INT

**Top rushers**

- MIA – Ricky Williams – 12 rushes, 54 yards
- STL – Steven Jackson – 21 rushes, 94 yards

**Top receivers**

- MIA – Davone Bess – 6 receptions, 84 yards
- STL – Dane Looker – 6 receptions, 52 yards

==== Week 14: at Buffalo Bills ====
Week Fourteen: Miami Dolphins at Buffalo Bills

Quarter	1	2	3	4	Total
**Dolphins**	7	6	0	3	**16**
Bills	3	0	0	0	**3**

at Rogers Centre, Toronto, Ontario

- Date: December 7
- Game time: 4:05 p.m. EST
- Game weather: None (retractable roof closed)
- Game attendance: 52,134
- Referee: John Parry
- TV announcers (CBS): Kevin Harlan & Rich Gannon

Game information

**First quarter**

- MIA – Anthony Fasano 20-yard pass from Chad Pennington (Dan Carpenter kick), 6:48. Dolphins 7–0. **Drive: 7 plays, 54 yards, 3:33.**
- BUF – Rian Lindell 40-yard field goal, 2:41. Dolphins 7–3. **Drive: 9 plays, 42 yards, 4:07.**

**Second quarter**

- MIA – Dan Carpenter 50-yard field goal, 12:13. Dolphins 10–3. **Drive: 8 plays, 10 yards, 5:28.**
- MIA – Dan Carpenter 35-yard field goal, 0:21. Dolphins 13–3. **Drive: 15 plays, 52 yards, 7:35.**

**Third quarter**

- No scoring plays

**Fourth quarter**

- MIA – Dan Carpenter 27-yard field goal, 8:10. Dolphins 16–3. **Drive: 9 plays, 30 yards, 5:10.**

**Top passers**

- MIA – Chad Pennington – 23/29, 181 yards, TD
- BUF – J. P. Losman – 13/27, 123 yards, INT

**Top rushers**

- MIA – Ronnie Brown – 16 rushes, 70 yards
- BUF – J. P. Losman – 5 rushes, 53 yards

**Top receivers**

- MIA – Davone Bess – 9 receptions, 74 yards
- BUF – Josh Reed – 5 receptions, 58 yards

==== Week 15: vs. San Francisco 49ers ====
Week Fifteen: San Francisco 49ers at Miami Dolphins

Quarter	1	2	3	4	Total
49ers	3	0	3	3	**9**
**Dolphins**	7	7	0	0	**14**

at Dolphin Stadium, Miami Gardens, Florida

- Date: December 14
- Game time: 1:00 p.m. EST
- Game weather: 77 °F (25 °C), cloudy
- Game attendance: 65,893
- Referee: Scott Green
- TV announcers (Fox): Sam Rosen, Tim Ryan, & Chris Myers

Game information

**First quarter**

- MIA – David Martin 61-yard pass from Chad Pennington (Dan Carpenter kick), 9:46. Dolphins 7–0. **Drive: 3 plays, 73 yards, 1:28.**
- SF – Joe Nedney 38-yard field goal, 3:57. Dolphins 7–3. **Drive: 10 plays, 60 yards, 5:49.**

**Second quarter**

- MIA – Joey Haynos 19-yard pass from Chad Pennington (Dan Carpenter kick), 8:27. Dolphins 14–3. **Drive: 4 plays, 34 yards, 2:16.**

**Third quarter**

- SF – Joe Nedney 23-yard field goal, 2:46. Dolphins 14–6. **Drive: 16 plays, 84 yards, 7:29.**

**Fourth quarter**

- SF – Joe Nedney 28-yard field goal, 9:21. Dolphins 14–9. **Drive: 13 plays, 69 yards, 6:44.**

**Top passers**

- SF – Shaun Hill – 30/46, 233 yards
- MIA – Chad Pennington – 12/19, 156 yards, 2 TD

**Top rushers**

- SF – DeShaun Foster – 18 rushes, 76 yards
- MIA – Ronnie Brown – 10 rushes, 67 yards

**Top receivers**

- SF – Isaac Bruce – 7 receptions, 71 yards
- MIA – David Martin – 2 receptions, 66 yards, TD

==== Week 16: at Kansas City Chiefs ====
Week Sixteen: Miami Dolphins at Kansas City Chiefs

Quarter	1	2	3	4	Total
**Dolphins**	10	14	7	7	**38**
Chiefs	7	21	3	0	**31**

at Arrowhead Stadium, Kansas City, Missouri

- Game time: 1:00 p.m. EST / 12:00 p.m. CST
- Game weather: 10 °F (−12 °C), sunny
- Game attendance: 73,689
- Referee: Jeff Triplette
- TV announcers (CBS): Dick Enberg, Randy Cross, Dan Fouts

Game information

**First quarter**

- MIA – Ted Ginn Jr. 31-yard run (Dan Carpenter kick), 14:42. Dolphins 7–0. **Drive: 1 play, 31 yards, 0:18.**
- MIA – Dan Carpenter 34-yard field goal, 11:43. Dolphins 10–0. **Drive: 8 plays, 5 yards, 1:07.**
- KC – Devard Darling 33-yard pass from Tyler Thigpen (Connor Barth kick), 10:15. Dolphins 10–7. **Drive: 3 plays, 65 yards, 1:28.**

**Second quarter**

- KC – Tony Gonzalez 8-yard pass from Tyler Thigpen (Connor Barth kick), 14:05. Chiefs 14–10. **Drive: 17 plays, 76 yards, 7:47.**
- MIA – David Martin 11-yard pass from Chad Pennington (Dan Carpenter kick), 11:33. Dolphins 17–14. **Drive: 5 plays, 72 yards, 2:32.**
- KC – Larry Johnson 2-yard run (Connor Barth kick), 10:32. Chiefs 21–17. **Drive: 2 plays, 77 yards, 1:01.**
- MIA – Anthony Fasano 14-yard pass from Chad Pennington (Dan Carpenter kick), 6:12. Dolphins 24–21. **Drive: 7 plays, 66 yards, 4:20.**
- KC – Tyler Thigpen 8-yard run (Connor Barth kick), 0:50. Chiefs 28–24. **Drive: 8 plays, 95 yards, 1:26.**

**Third quarter**

- KC – Connor Barth 27-yard field goal, 9:11. Chiefs 31–24. **Drive: 9 plays, 69 yards, 5:49.**
- MIA – Ricky Williams 4-yard run (Dan Carpenter kick), 6:46. Tied 31–31. **Drive: 5 plays, 60 yards, 2:25.**

**Fourth quarter**

- MIA – Anthony Fasano 14-yard pass from Chad Pennington (Dan Carpenter kick), 4:08. Dolphins 38–31. **Drive: 13 plays, 71 yards, 8:33.**

**Top passers**

- MIA – Chad Pennington – 26/34, 235 yards, 3 TD, INT
- KC – Tyler Thigpen – 20/41, 320 yards, 2 TD, 3 INT

**Top rushers**

- MIA – Patrick Cobbs – 2 rushes, 44 yards
- KC – Larry Johnson – 12 rushes, 108 yards, TD

**Top receivers**

- MIA – Davone Bess – 6 receptions, 57 yards
- KC – Jamaal Charles – 3 receptions, 102 yards

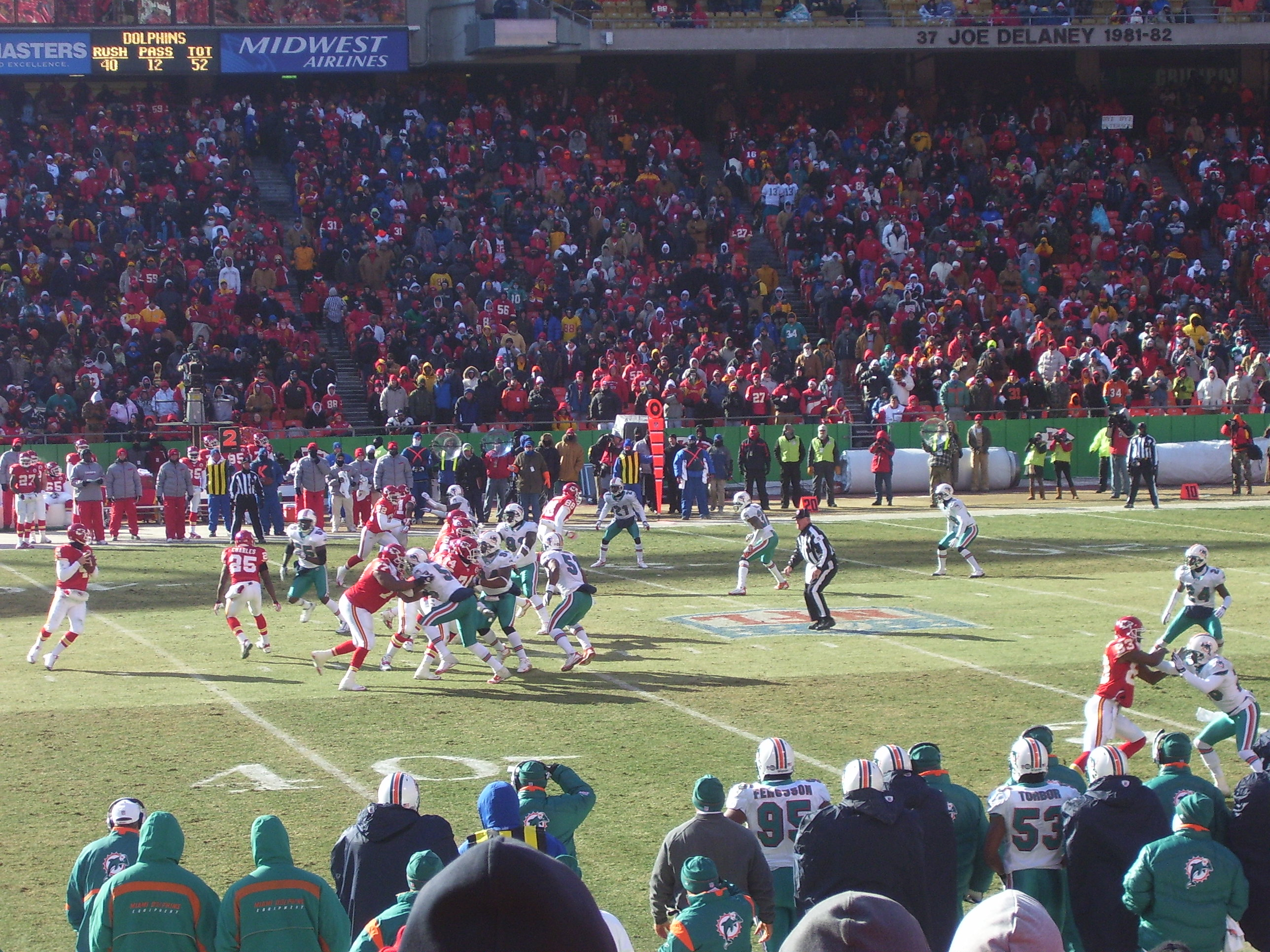

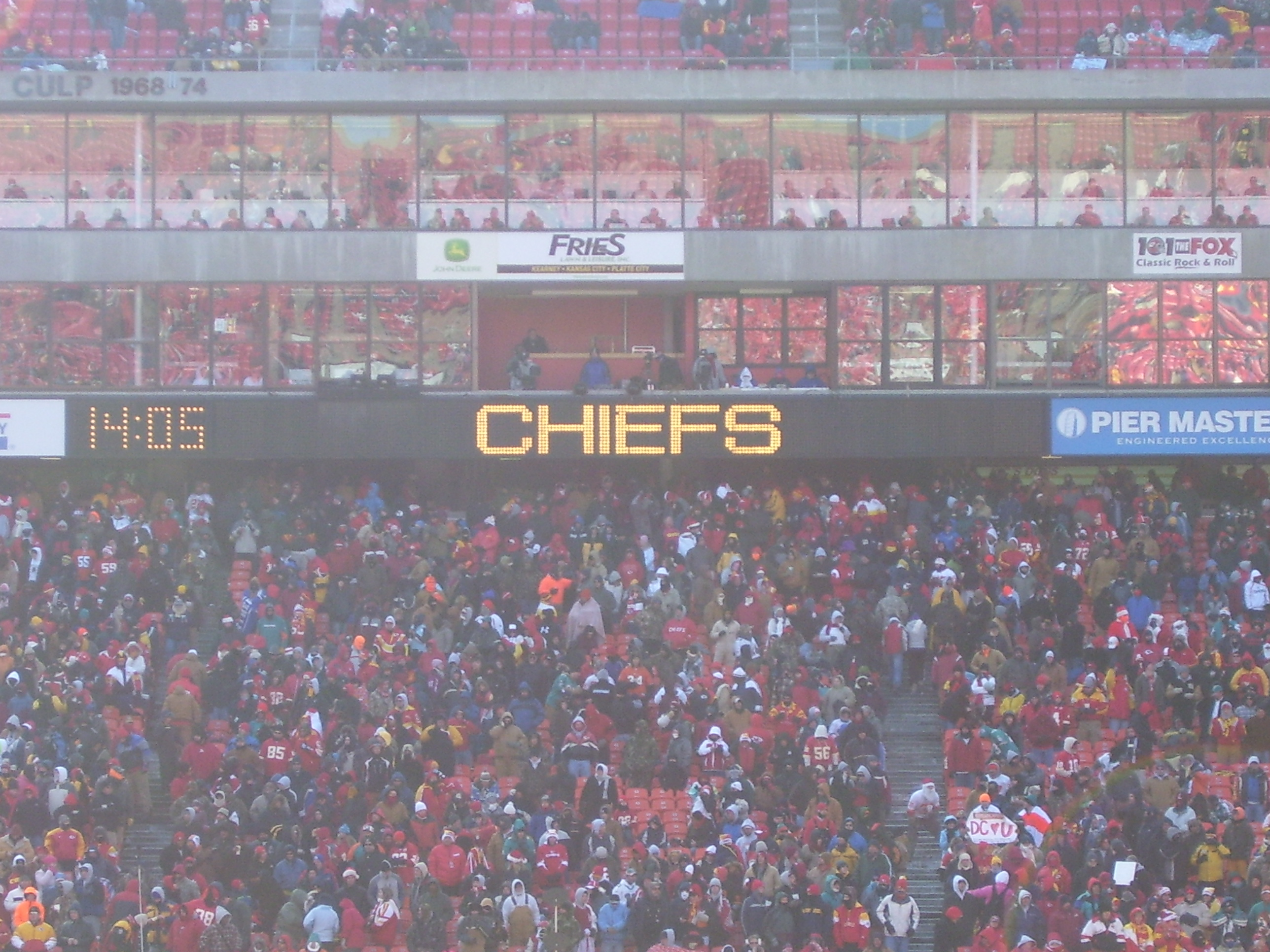

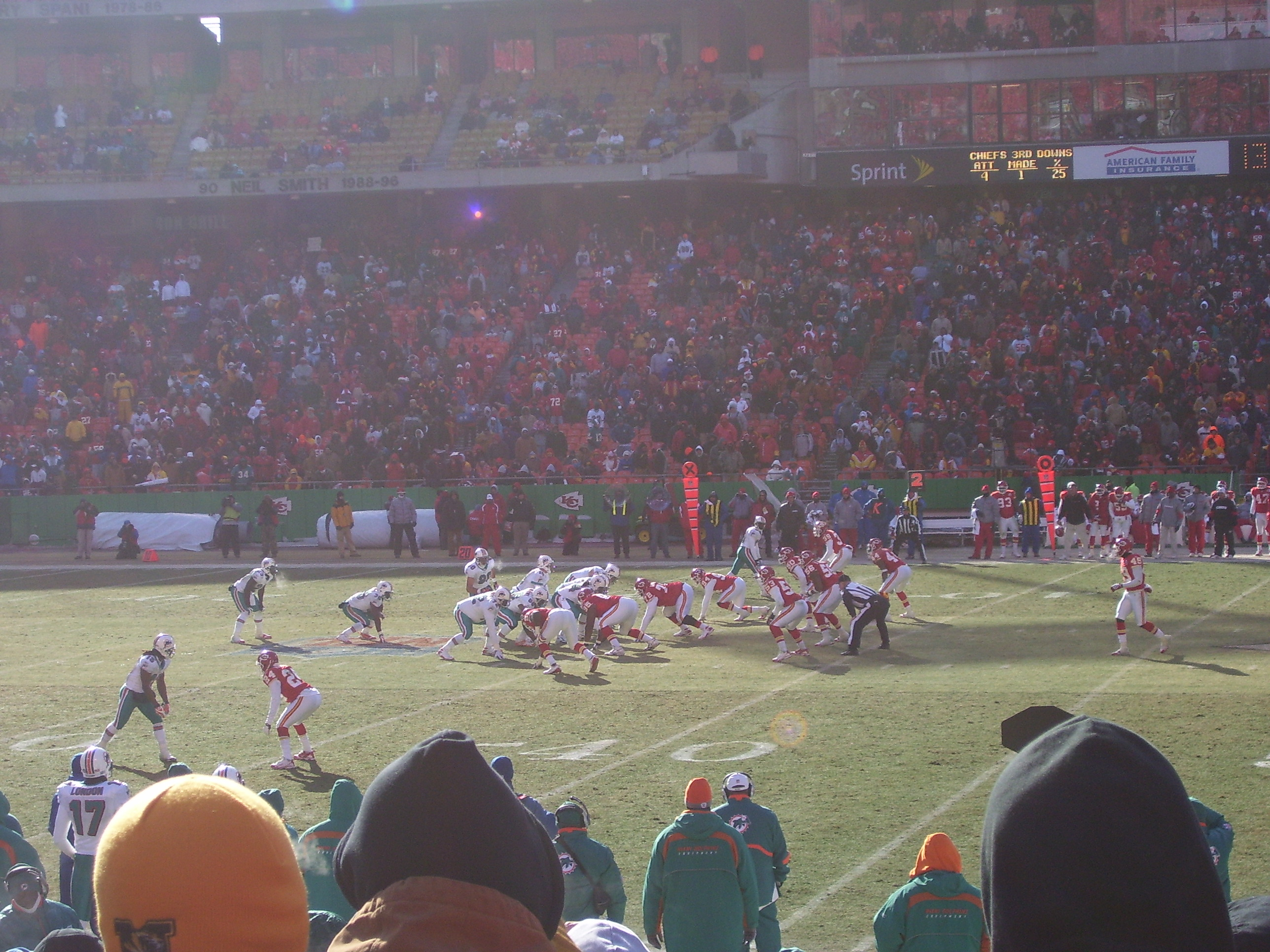

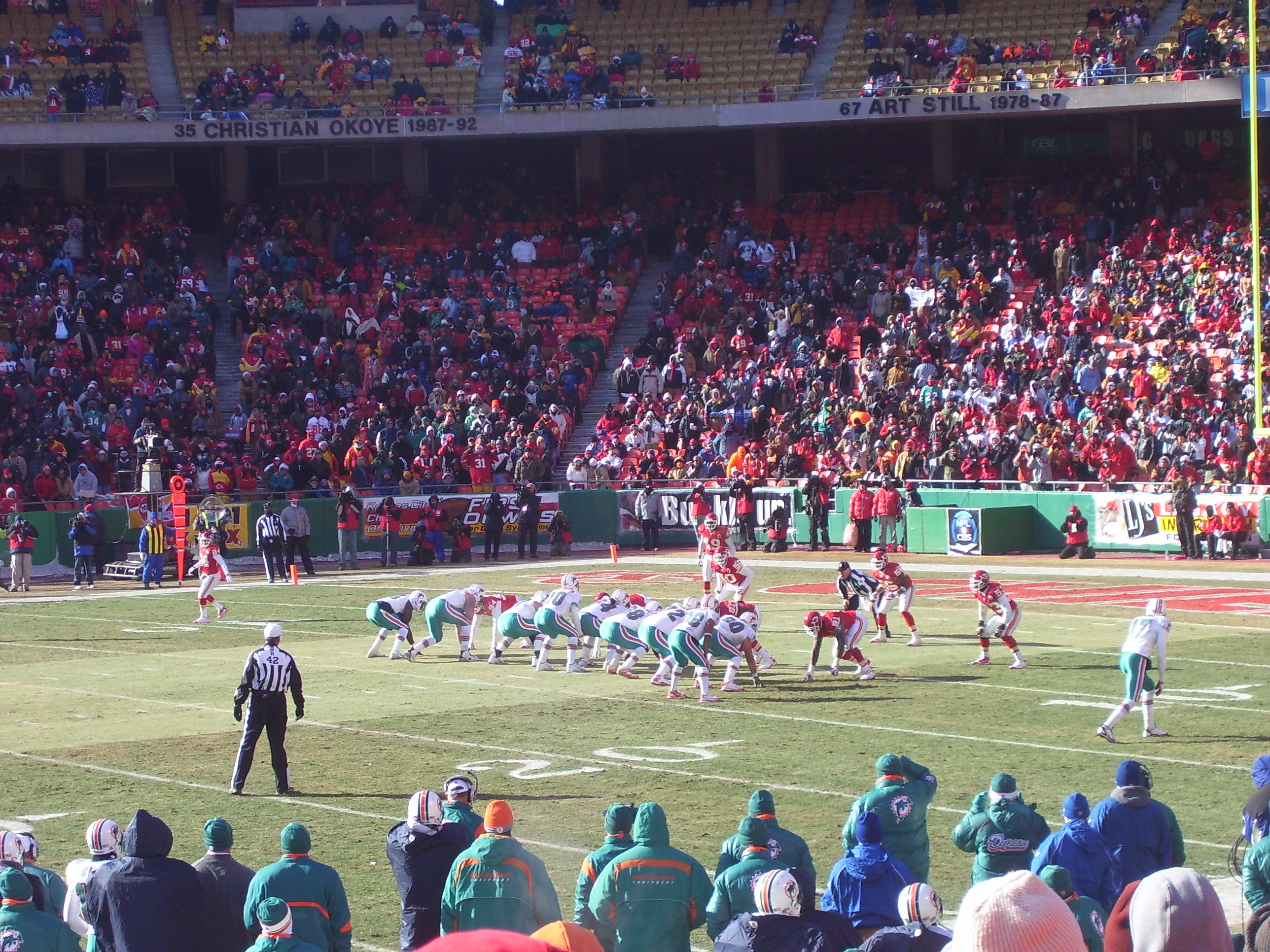

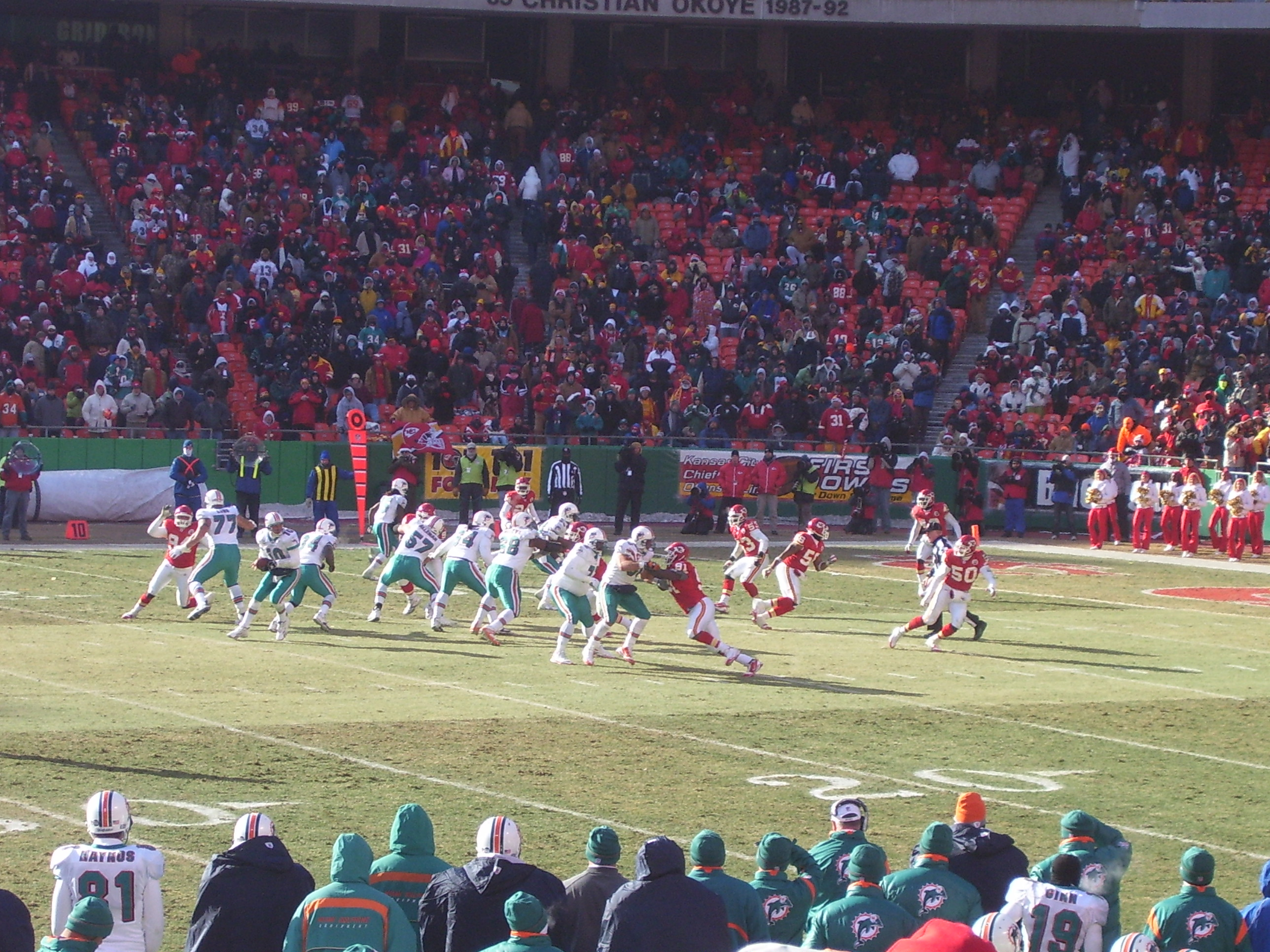

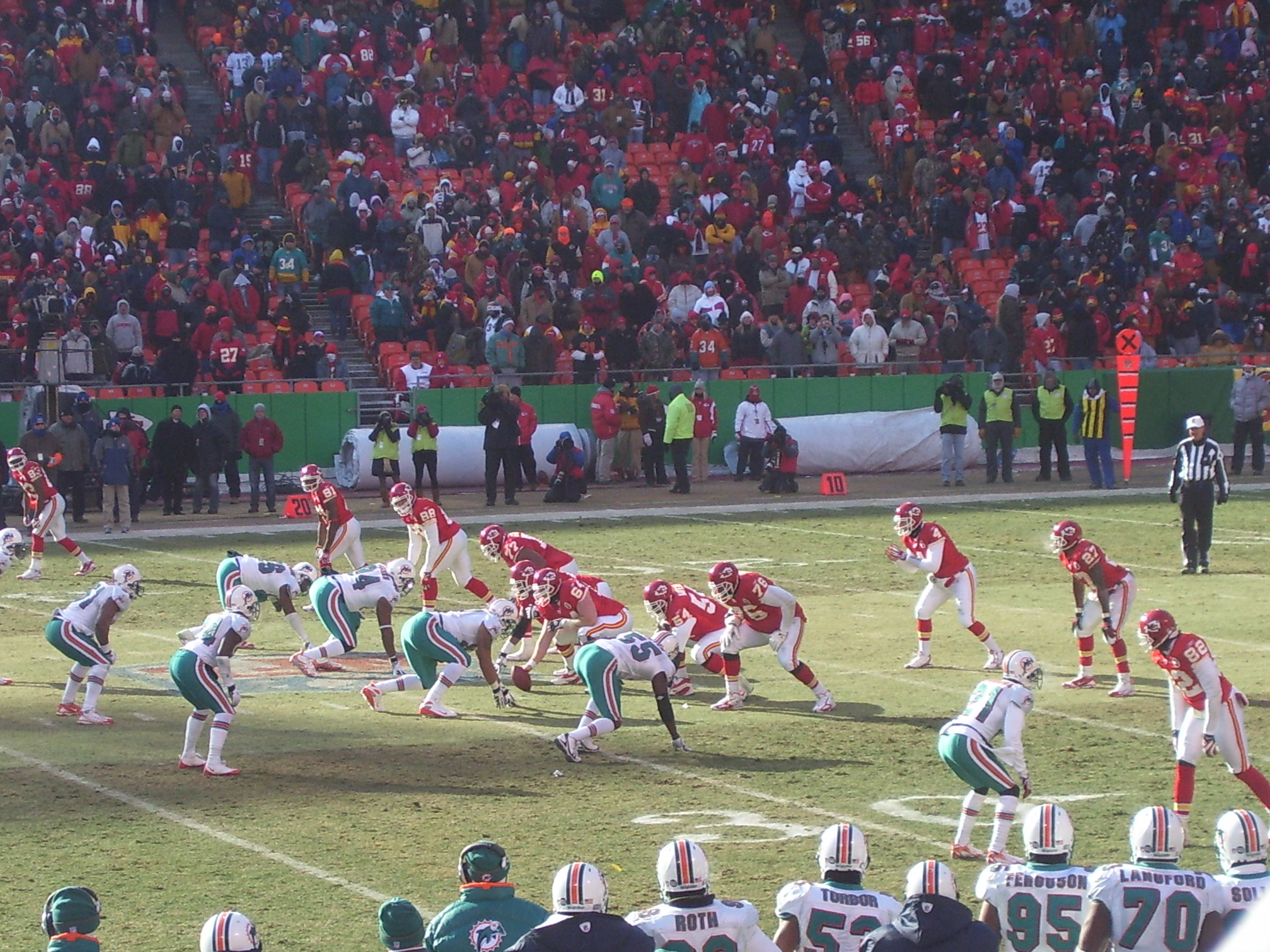

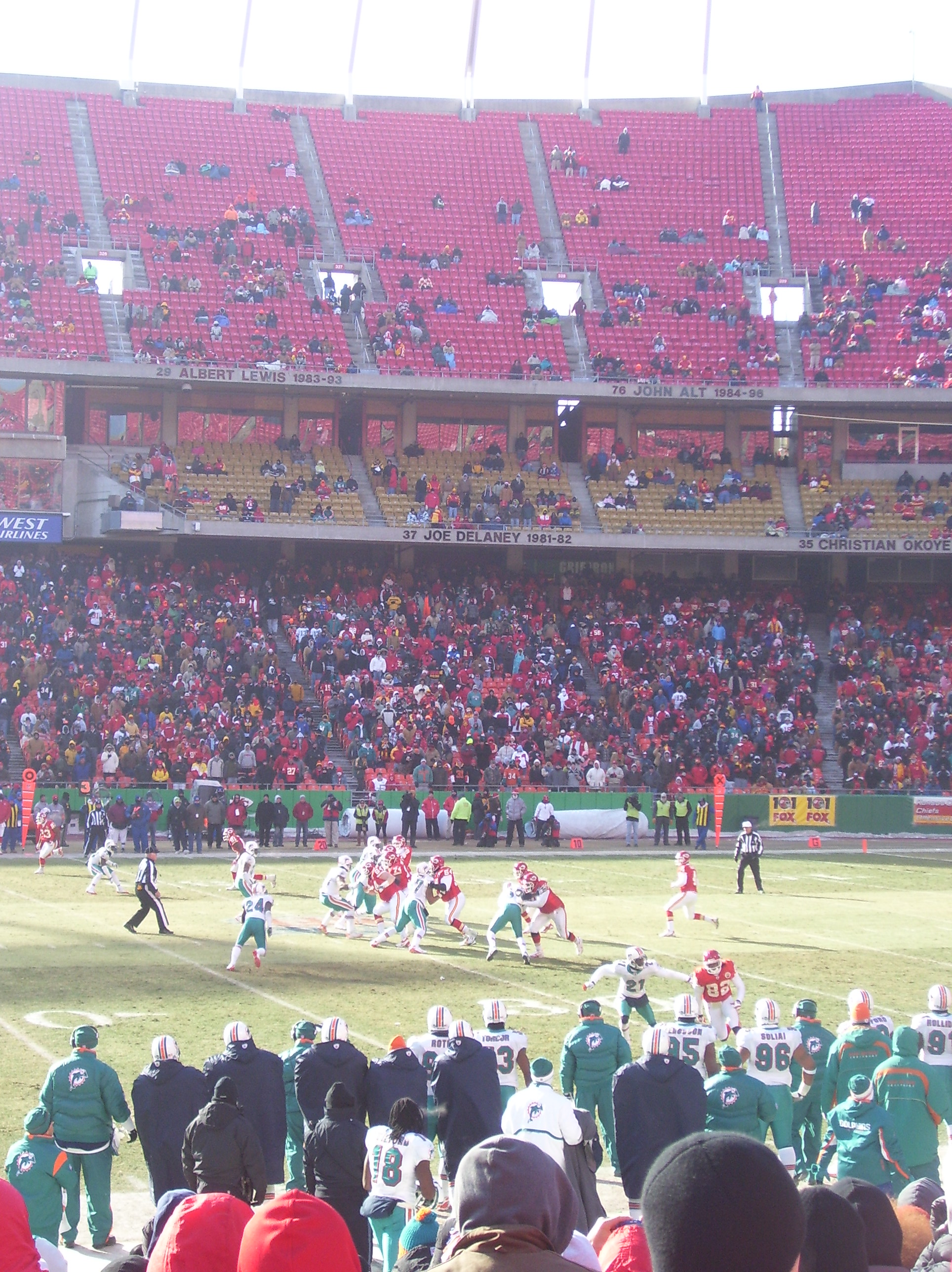

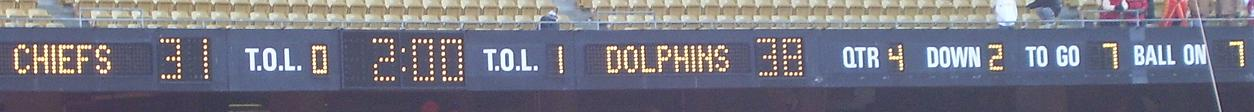

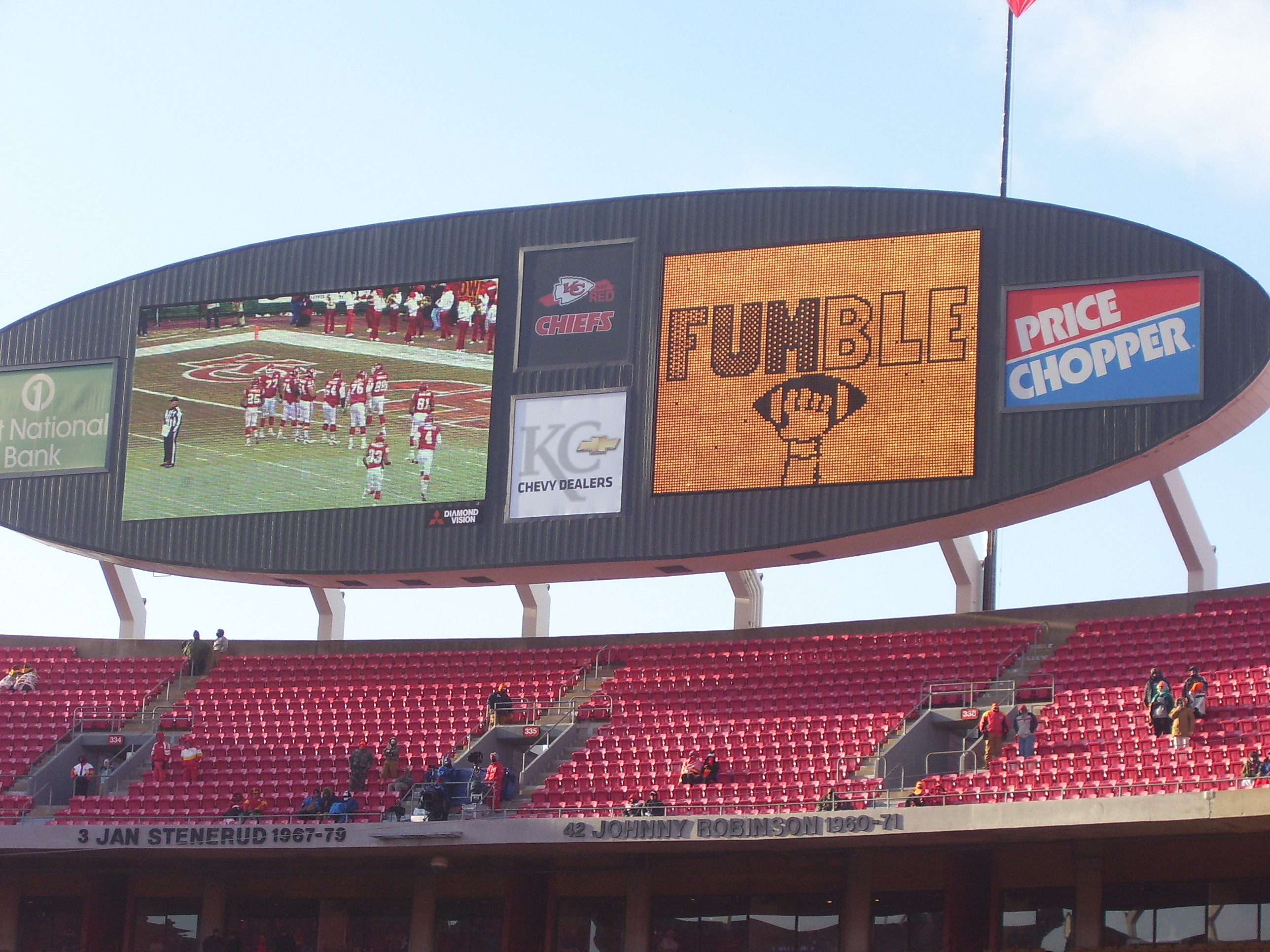

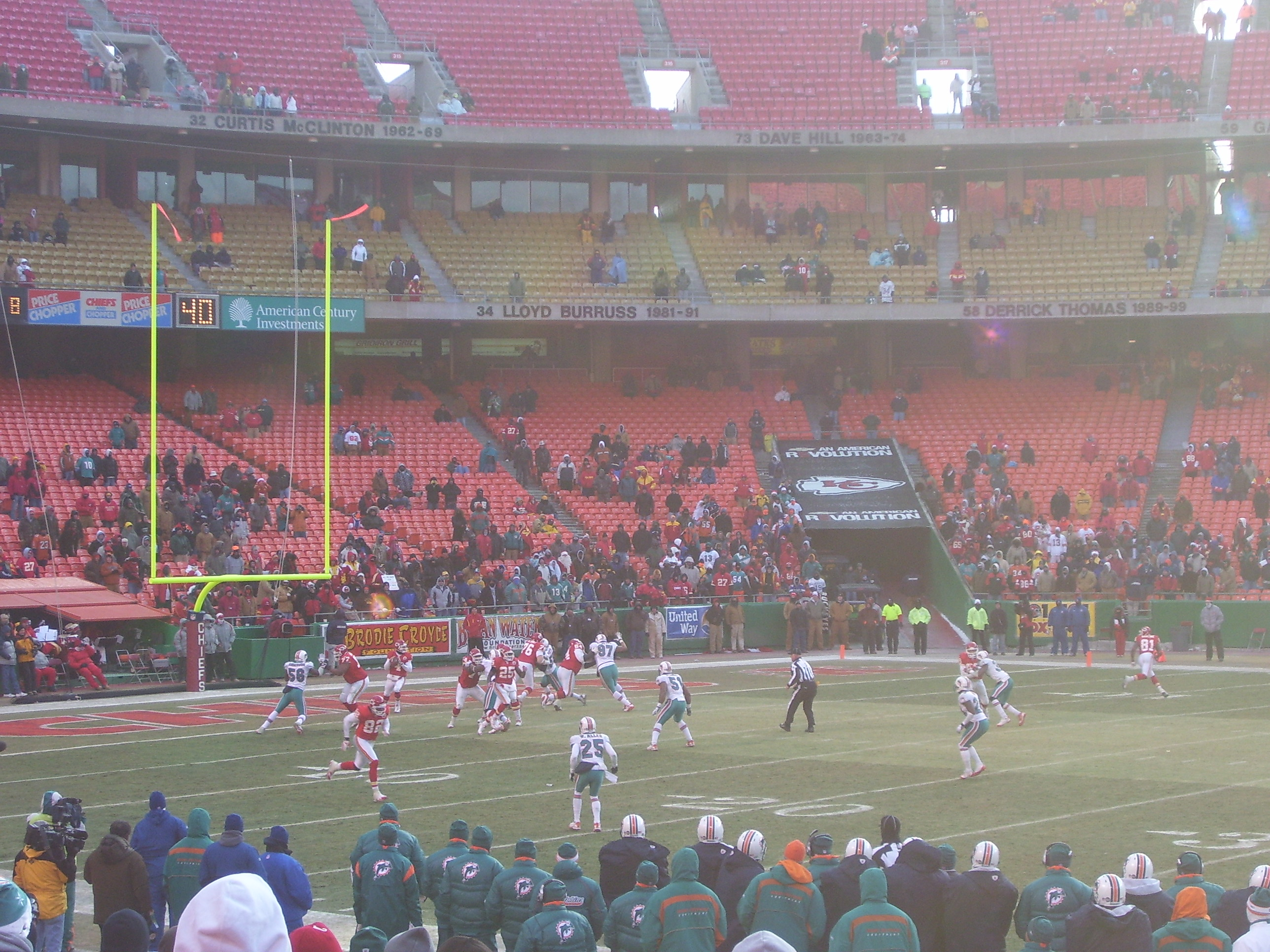

==== Week 17: at New York Jets ====
Week Seventeen: Miami Dolphins at New York Jets

Quarter	1	2	3	4	Total
**Dolphins**	0	14	7	3	**24**
Jets	0	9	8	0	**17**

at The Meadowlands, East Rutherford, New Jersey

- Date: December 28
- Game time: 4:15 p.m. EST
- Game weather: 65 °F (18 °C), cloudy
- Game attendance: 79,454
- Referee: Bill Leavy
- TV announcers (CBS): Jim Nantz and Phil Simms

Game information

**First quarter**

- No scoring plays

**Second quarter**

- NYJ – Laveranues Coles 13-yard pass from Brett Favre (kick failed), 6:47. Jets 6–0. **Drive: 8 plays, 51 yards, 3:51.**
- MIA – Ted Ginn Jr. 27-yard pass from Chad Pennington (Dan Carpenter kick), 2:18. Dolphins 7–6. **Drive: 6 plays, 60 yards, 2:12.**
- MIA – Phillip Merling 25-yard interception return (Dan Carpenter kick), 2:03. Dolphins 14–6.
- NYJ – Jay Feely 28-yard field goal, 0:00. Dolphins 14–9. **Drive: 10 plays, 64 yards, 2:03.**

**Third quarter**

- NYJ – Leon Washington 10-yard run (Brett Favre pass to Jerricho Cotchery), 10:33. Jets 17–14. **Drive: 5 plays, 13 yards, 2:01.**
- MIA – Anthony Fasano 20-yard pass from Chad Pennington (Dan Carpenter kick), 7:16. Dolphins 21–17. **Drive: 6 plays, 80 yards, 3:17.**

**Fourth quarter**

- MIA – Dan Carpenter 48-yard field goal, 9:20. Dolphins 24–17. **Drive: 6 plays, 19 yards, 3:21.**

**Top passers**

- MIA – Chad Pennington – 22/30, 200 yards, 2 TD
- NYJ – Brett Favre – 20/40, 233 yards, TD, 3 INT

**Top rushers**

- MIA – Ronnie Brown – 11 rushes, 57 yards
- NYJ – Leon Washington – 10 rushes, 60 yards, TD

**Top receivers**

- MIA – Ted Ginn Jr. – 2 receptions, 71 yards, 2 TD
- NYJ – Laveranues Coles – 4 receptions, 88 yards, TD

The Miami defense intercepted quarterback Brett Favre three times (Philip Merling recorded 25-yard pick-six) while Charlie Anderson and Patrick Cobbs blocked a Jets punt. The win put earned the Dolphins a playoff berth for the first time since 2001, as well as their first AFC East title since 2000. As of 2025, this remains the last time they had clinched the AFC East.

=== Transactions ===
==== August ====
- **31** – Signed running back Ricky Williams to a one-year contract extension through the 2009 season.
- **31** – Waived wide receiver Anthony Armstrong, offensive lineman Trey Darilek and linebacker Rob Ninkovich.
- **31** – Claimed offensive lineman Andy Alleman (Saints), offensive tackle Nate Garner (Jets) and wide receiver Brandon London (Giants) off waivers.

==== September ====
- **1** – Signed cornerback Will Billingsley, wide receiver Jayson Foster, offensive tackle Daren Heerspink, running back Lex Hilliard, tight end Matthew Mulligan and linebacker Tyson Smith (Cowboys) to the practice squad.
- **2** – Released cornerback Joey Thomas.
- **2** – Signed safety Tyrone Culver (Packer).
- **2** – Released wide receiver Jayson Foster from the practice squad.
- **2** – Re-signed wide receiver Anthony Armstrong, linebacker Rob Ninkovich and defensive tackle Anthony Toribio to the practice squad.
- **9** – Released fullback Boomer Grigsby.
- **9** – Signed fullback Casey Cramer (Titans).
- **9** – Placed guard Donald Thomas on injured reserve.
- **9** – Signed guard Evan Mathis (Panther).
- **11** – Released tight end Sean Ryan.
- **11** – Claimed offensive tackle Kirk Barton (Bears) off waivers.
- **12** – Released offensive tackle Daren Heerspink from the practice squad.
- **12** – Signed tight end Drew Atchison (Cowboys) to the practice squad.
- **23** – Waived running back Jalen Parmele.
- **23** – Released tight end Drew Atchison from the practice squad.
- **23** – Signed guard Matt McChesney (Jets) to the practice squad.
- **24** – Signed tight end Joey Haynos off the practice squad of the Green Bay Packers.
- **25** – Released cornerback Will Billingsley from the practice squad.
- **25** – Re-signed running back Jalen Parmele to the practice squad.

==== October ====
- **4** – Released defensive tackle Anthony Toribio from the practice squad.
- **4** – Re-signed cornerback Will Billingsley to the practice squad.
- **6** – Released linebacker Tyson Smith from the practice squad.
- **6** – Signed linebacker Marc Magro (Rams) to the practice squad.
- **8** – Released cornerback Will Billingsley from the practice squad.
- **8** – Re-signed defensive tackle Anthony Toribio to the practice squad.
- **11** – Released defensive tackle Anthony Toribio from the practice squad.
- **11** – Re-signed cornerback Will Billingsley to the practice squad.
- **14** – Released safety Tyrone Culver.
- **14** – Released linebacker Marc Magro from the practice squad.
- **14** – Signed linebacker William Kershaw (Saints) to the practice squad.
- **15** – Waived offensive tackle Kirk Barton.
- **15** – Signed safety Brannon Condren (Rams).
- **15** – Signed fullback Lousaka Polite (Bears).
- **18** – Suspended defensive tackle Paul Soliai for one game.
- **18** – Released cornerback Will Billingsley from the practice squad.
- **18** – Re-signed defensive tackle Anthony Toribio to the practice squad.
- **20** – Lifted suspension of defensive tackle Paul Soliai.
- **21** – Released safety Chris Crocker.
- **21** – Re-signed safety Tyrone Culver.
- **24** – Placed cornerback Michael Lehan on injured reserve.
- **24** – Re-signed cornerback Joey Thomas.

==== November ====
- **4** – Waived wide receiver Derek Hagan.
- **4** – Released tight end Matthew Mulligan from the practice squad.
- **4** – Re-signed cornerback Will Billingsley to the practice squad.
- **5** – Signed offensive tackle Brandon Frye off the practice squad of the Houston Texans.
- **7** – Waived guard Evan Mathis.
- **7** – Signed guard Matt McChesney from the practice squad to the active roster.
- **10** – Waived safety Brannon Condren.
- **10** – Re-signed safety Courtney Bryan.
- **10** – Signed wide receiver Todd Lowber (Cowboys) to the practice squad.
- **11** – Released defensive tackle Anthony Toribio from the practice squad.
- **11** – Signed offensive tackle Kirk Barton (49ers) to the practice squad.
- **15** – Placed guard Matt McChesney on injured reserve.
- **15** – Signed linebacker Rob Ninkovich from the practice squad to the active roster.
- **18** – Signed defensive tackle Joe Cohen (49ers) to the practice squad.
- **19** – Waived linebacker Rob Ninkovich.
- **19** – Claimed linebacker Erik Walden (Chiefs) off waivers.
- **21** – Released cornerback Will Billingsley from the practice squad.
- **21** – Re-signed linebacker Rob Ninkovich to the practice squad.
- **24** – Placed wide receiver Greg Camarillo on injured reserve.
- **28** – Practice squad offensive tackle Kirk Barton signed by the Cincinnati Bengals.
- **29** – Signed center Al Johnson (Cardinals).
- **29** – Re-signed cornerback Will Billingsley to the practice squad.

==== December ====
- **2** – Placed guard Justin Smiley on injured reserve.
- **3** – Claimed wide receiver Chris Hannon off waivers from the San Francisco 49ers.
- **3** – Practice squad linebacker Rob Ninkovich signed by the New Orleans Saints.
- **9** – Re-signed offensive tackle Daren Heerspink to the practice squad.
- **10** – Practice Squad running back Jalen Parmele signed by the Baltimore Ravens.
- **10** – Signed fullback Chris Brown to the practice squad.
- **10** – Waived cornerback Michael Lehan from injured reserve.
- **20** – Waived fullback Casey Cramer.
- **20** – Signed linebacker William Kershaw from the practice squad to the active roster.
- **22** – Waived wide receiver Chris Hannon.
- **22** – Signed linebacker Derek Smith (Chargers).
- **24** – Re-signed cornerback Scorpio Babers to the practice squad.

=== Awards and honors ===
==== Coaches ====
After leading the Dolphins to an 11–5 record and an AFC East title in his first year as head coach, Tony Sparano was selected as the NFL Alumni's 2008 Coach of the Year. Sparano was also one of six nominees for the 2008 Motorola NFL Coach of the Year Award.

==== Players ====
The Dolphins landed two players – running back Ronnie Brown and linebacker Joey Porter – on the AFC's Pro Bowl team. Porter recorded 17.5 sacks during the 2008 season and was named as a starter on the AFC's squad. In his first career Pro Bowl season, Brown led the Dolphins with 214 carries, 916 rushing yards and 10 rushing touchdowns. He also ranked fourth on the team with 33 catches and sixth with 254 receiving yards.

Additionally, Porter was nominated for the GMC Sierra Defensive Player of the Year Award and was a second-team AP All-Pro selection. Quarterback Chad Pennington, guard Justin Smiley and cornerback Will Allen also received votes for the All-Pro team but were not selected.

However, Pennington did earn the NFL Comeback Player of the Year Award for the second time in his career. Pennington led the NFL with a 67.4 completion percentage and was second in the NFL with a 97.4 passer rating. He threw for a career-high 3,653 yards, 19 touchdowns and just seven interceptions.

In January 2009, three Dolphins rookies were selected to the Pro Football Writers Association's All-Rookie Team. Earning selections were offensive tackle Jake Long, defensive end Kendall Langford and placekicker Dan Carpenter.

The first overall pick in the 2008 NFL draft, Long started all 16 games for the Dolphins at left tackle. A third-round pick out of Hampton, Langford started 14 of the 16 games in which he played as a rookie and recorded 31 tackles and two sacks. Undrafted out of Montana, Carpenter went 21-for-25 (84 percent) on field goals and made all 40 extra-point attempts.

== Playoffs ==
=== Game summaries ===
==== AFC Wild Card: vs. Baltimore Ravens ====
AFC Wild Card Playoffs: Baltimore Ravens at Miami Dolphins

Quarter	1	2	3	4	Total
Ravens	3	10	7	7	27
Dolphins	3	0	0	6	9

at Dolphin Stadium, Miami Gardens, Florida

- Date: January 4, 2009
- Game time: 1:00 p.m. EST
- Game weather: 79 °F (26 °C), cloudy
- Game attendance: 65,859
- Referee: Ed Hochuli
- TV announcers (CBS): Jim Nantz and Phil Simms

Game information

First quarter

- MIA – Dan Carpenter 19-yard field goal, 8:17. Dolphins 3–0. Drive: 8 plays, 50 yards, 4:15.
- BAL – Matt Stover 23-yard field goal, 2:47. Tied 3–3. Drive: 11 plays, 59 yards, 5:30.

Second quarter

- BAL – Ed Reed 64-yard interception return (Matt Stover kick), 2:30. Ravens 10–3.
- BAL – Matt Stover 31-yard field goal, 0:16. Ravens 13–3. Drive: 7 plays, 46 yards, 1:21.

Third quarter

- BAL – Le'Ron McClain 8-yard run (Matt Stover kick), 7:33. Ravens 20–3. Drive: 4 plays, 19 yards, 2:09.

Fourth quarter

- MIA – Ronnie Brown 2-yard pass from Chad Pennington (kick failed), 13:09. Ravens 20–9. Drive: 6 plays, 74 yards, 1:51.
- BAL – Joe Flacco 5-yard run (Matt Stover kick), 3:53. Ravens 27–9. Drive: 8 plays, 71 yards, 3:44.

Top passers

- BAL – Joe Flacco – 9/23, 135 yards
- MIA – Chad Pennington – 25/38, 252 yards, TD, 4 INT

Top rushers

- BAL – Le'Ron McClain – 19 rushes, 75 yards, TD
- MIA – Ronnie Brown – 12 rushes, 19 yards

Top receivers

- BAL – Derrick Mason – 4 receptions, 71 yards
- MIA – Patrick Cobbs – 4 receptions, 55 yards

Entering the postseason as the AFC's No. 3 seed, the Dolphins began their playoff run at home in the AFC Wild Card Round, with a Week 7 rematch against the No. 6 Baltimore Ravens. Miami would deliver the game's first points with rookie kicker Dan Carpenter's 19-yard field goal. The Ravens would later respond with a 23-yard field goal from kicker Matt Stover. Baltimore would take the lead with safety Ed Reed returning a Chad Pennington interception 64 yards for a touchdown. The Ravens would then close out the half with Stover's 31-yard field goal.

Baltimore would increase their lead in the third quarter with running back Le'Ron McClain's 8-yard touchdown run. The Dolphins tried to come back in the fourth quarter as Pennington completed a 2-yard touchdown pass to running back Ronnie Brown (with a failed PAT), but the Ravens would pull away as quarterback Joe Flacco got a 5-yard touchdown run.

With the loss, Miami's impressive turnaround season ended with an overall record of 11–6.

Despite having only 16 turnovers throughout the entire regular season, the Dolphins committed 5 turnovers (4 interceptions and a lost fumble).
