= Newberry High School (South Carolina) =

Public high school in Newberry County, South Carolina, United States

Coordinates: 34.2834731°N 81.582328°W

Location
- 3113 Main Street; Newberry, South Carolina 29108; United States

Information
- Type: Public
- School district: Newberry County School District
- Principal: Sarah Harvey
- Teaching staff: 53.00 (on FTE basis)
- Grades: 9–12
- Enrollment: 809 (2023-2024)
- Student to teacher ratio: 15.26
- Colors: Navy, Columbia blue and white
- Mascot: Bulldog
- Website: www.newberryhs.org

Newberry High School is a four-year public high school in Newberry County, South Carolina. Less than 2,000 students attend the high school.

== Sports ==
Newberry High School has a wide array of sports that compete in SCHSL AAA division which include:

Fall Sports: V. Football (which experienced success in 2006, winning the 2A upperstate championship), J.V. Football, V. Volleyball, J.V. Volleyball, Girls Tennis, Swimming, V. Cheerleaders, J.V. Cheerleaders, and Training Staff.

Winter: V. Boys Basketball (who won the AA upper state championships in 2012 and 2013, but won the state title in 2014). V. Girls Basketball, (who lost the upper-state championships (2014–16), lost the state title in 2017, but won the 3A title in 2018). J.V. Boys Basketball, J.V. Girls Basketball, "B" Team Boys Basketball, Hayden

Wrestling, V. Cheerleaders, and J.V. Cheerleaders.

Spring: V. Baseball, J.V. Baseball, V. Softball, J.V. Softball, J.V. Boys Soccer, V. Boys Soccer, V. Girls Soccer, Boys Tennis Track, Golf, and Weightlifting.

Quamel Brown has the highest track time with 10.44 seconds which is the best in the school's history.

== Notable alumni ==
- Greg Hartle, former NFL player
- Junior Glymph, former NFL player
- Willie Scott, former NFL player
