= William Kershaw =

American football player (born 1983)

No. 52, 53, 58
- Position: Linebacker

Personal information
- Born: December 15, 1983 (age 42); Pinehurst, North Carolina, U.S.
- Listed height: 6 ft 3 in (1.91 m)
- Listed weight: 240 lb (109 kg)

Career information
- High school: Hoke County (Raeford, North Carolina)
- College: Maryland (2002–2005)
- NFL draft: 2006: undrafted

Career history
- Kansas City Chiefs (2006–2007); Philadelphia Eagles (2007)*; Houston Texans (2007); Philadelphia Eagles (2007)*; Denver Broncos (2008)*; New Orleans Saints (2008)*; Miami Dolphins (2008–2009)
- * Offseason or practice squad member only

Career NFL statistics
- Total tackles: 2
- Forced fumbles: 1
- Stats at Pro Football Reference

William Howard Kershaw, Jr. (born December 15, 1983) is an American former professional football player who was a linebacker in the National Football League (NFL). He played college football for the Maryland Terrapins and was signed by the Kansas City Chiefs as an undrafted free agent in 2006.

Kershaw was also a member of the Philadelphia Eagles, Houston Texans, Denver Broncos and New Orleans Saints.
