= Keith Saunders =

American football player (born 1984)

No. 94
- Position: Linebacker

Personal information
- Born: December 23, 1984 (age 41); Willingboro Township, New Jersey, U.S.
- Listed height: 6 ft 3 in (1.91 m)
- Listed weight: 240 lb (109 kg)

Career information
- College: Alabama
- NFL draft: 2008: undrafted

Career history
- Miami Dolphins (2008)*; Winnipeg Blue Bombers (2009)
- * Offseason or practice squad member only

Keith Saunders (born December 23, 1984) is a former gridiron football linebacker for the Winnipeg Blue Bombers of the Canadian Football League (CFL). He was signed by the Miami Dolphins as an undrafted free agent in 2008. He played college football at Alabama.

== Early life ==
Saunders played both defensive end and tight end at Holy Cross High School.
