= Joey Thomas =

American football player (born 1980)

No. 24, 33, 41
- Position: Cornerback

Personal information
- Born: August 29, 1980 (age 46); Seattle, Washington, U.S.
- Listed height: 6 ft 1 in (1.85 m)
- Listed weight: 190 lb (86 kg)

Career information
- High school: John F. Kennedy Catholic (Burien, Washington)
- College: Montana State
- NFL draft: 2004: 3rd round, 70th overall pick

Career history
- Green Bay Packers (2004–2005); New Orleans Saints (2005); Dallas Cowboys (2007)*; Edmonton Eskimos (2007); Miami Dolphins (2008); Oakland Raiders (2010)
- * Offseason or practice squad member only

Awards and highlights
- 2× First-team All-Big Sky (2002-2003)

Career NFL statistics
- Total tackles: 39
- Forced fumbles: 1
- Fumble recoveries: 1
- Pass deflections: 4
- Stats at Pro Football Reference
- Stats at CFL.ca (archive)

Joseph Elleweyn Thomas (born August 29, 1980) is an American former professional football player who was a cornerback in the National Football League (NFL) and Canadian Football League (CFL). He was selected by the Green Bay Packers in the third round of the 2004 NFL draft. He played college football for the Montana State Bobcats.

Thomas was also a member of the New Orleans Saints, Dallas Cowboys, Edmonton Eskimos, Miami Dolphins and Oakland Raiders.

The past few years, Thomas was the head football coach at Ballard High School in Seattle, Washington. However, he decided to become the head coach at Garfield High School in Seattle.

== Early life ==
Thomas attended Kennedy Catholic High School in Burien, Washington, and was a student and a letterman in football. In football, he played quarterback and cornerback. At quarterback, he was a two-time All-Area selection and a two-time All-State selection. As a junior, he had eight interceptions, which ranked second in the state. Thomas graduated from John F.Kennedy High School in 1999.

== Professional career ==
Pre-draft measurables
Height	Weight	Arm length	Hand span	40-yard dash	10-yard split	20-yard split	20-yard shuttle	Three-cone drill	Vertical jump	Broad jump	Bench press
6 ft 0 7/8 in (1.85 m)	195 lb (88 kg)	31 7/8 in (0.81 m)	9 1/8 in (0.23 m)	4.45 s	1.55 s	2.59 s	3.88 s	6.82 s	38.5 in (0.98 m)	10 ft 2 in (3.10 m)	17 reps
All values from NFL Combine

=== Green Bay Packers ===
Thomas was selected out of Montana State University in the third round (70th overall) of the 2004 NFL draft by the Green Bay Packers. Thomas was later waived by Green Bay on November 2, 2005.

=== New Orleans Saints ===
He was then picked up by the New Orleans Saints on November 3, 2005.

=== Oakland Raiders ===
Thomas signed with the Oakland Raiders on May 3, 2010.
