= Daren Heerspink =

American gridiron football player (born 1984)

Profile
- Position: Offensive tackle

Personal information
- Born: April 2, 1984 (age 42); Bellingham, Washington, U.S.
- Listed height: 6 ft 6 in (1.98 m)
- Listed weight: 315 lb (143 kg)

Career information
- College: Portland State
- NFL draft: 2008: undrafted

Career history
- Miami Dolphins (2008)*; St. Louis Rams (2009)*; BC Lions (2009)
- * Offseason or practice squad member only

Awards and highlights
- 2× Second-team All-Big Sky (2006–2007)
- Stats at CFL.ca (archive)

Daren John Heerspink (born April 2, 1984) is an American former professional football offensive tackle. He was signed by the Miami Dolphins as an undrafted free agent in 2008. He played college football at Portland State.

Heerspink was also a member of the St. Louis Rams and BC Lions.

== College career ==
Heerspink was three-year starter and a two-time Second-team All-Big Sky at RT in 2006 and 2007. Moved into the starting lineup for the last two games of the season after an injury to Adrian Limbrick in '05. Backup offensive lineman, got into eight games, mainly in special teams situations in '04. Redshirted the '03.

== Professional career ==
=== Miami Dolphins ===
He was signed by the Miami Dolphins as an undrafted free agent in 2008. Heerspink was signed to the Dolphins practice squad after being waived a week earlier.

=== St. Louis Rams ===
After being cut by the Dolphins, Heerspink signed with the Rams on March 19, 2009. He was waived on July 1, 2009.

=== BC Lions ===
Heerspink signed with the BC Lions on July 6, 2009 and joined their practice roster.

On July 16, he moved up to the starting left tackle position on the Lions roster.

On June 15, 2010 during training camp Heerspink was released by the Lions.
