= Michael Byrne (gridiron football) =

American gridiron football player (born 1986)

Profile
- Position: Offensive lineman

Personal information
- Born: October 17, 1986 (age 40); Lancaster, Pennsylvania, U.S.
- Listed height: 6 ft 5 in (1.96 m)
- Listed weight: 300 lb (136 kg)

Career information
- College: Delaware
- NFL draft: 2008: undrafted

Career history
- Miami Dolphins (2008)*; Calgary Stampeders (2008–2009); Toronto Argonauts (2010)*; Pittsburgh Power (2012); Lehigh Valley Steelhawks (2011–2012)
- * Offseason or practice squad member only

Awards and highlights
- Third-team All-Atlantic 10 (2006); First-team All-CAA (2007); Third-team AP All-American (2007); Grey Cup champion (2008)
- Stats at CFL.ca (archive)

Michael Timothy Byrne (born October 17, 1986) is an American former football offensive lineman. He was signed by the Miami Dolphins as an undrafted free agent in 2008. He played college football at Delaware.

== Professional career ==
Byrne also played in the Canadian Football League for the Calgary Stampeders and was a member of the Toronto Argonauts.
