= Anthony Toribio =

American football player (born 1985)

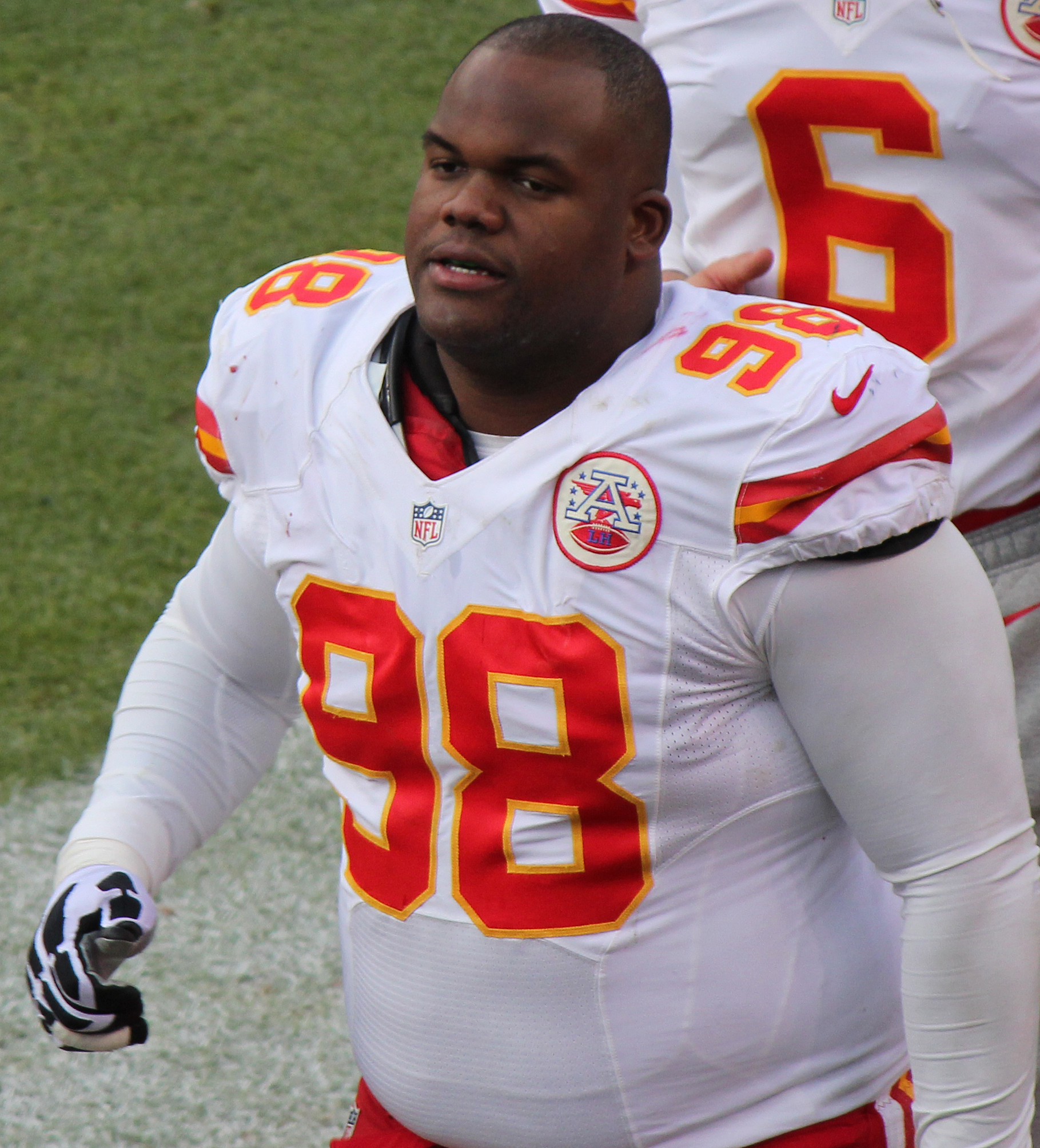
- Toribio with the Kansas City Chiefs in 2012

No. 93, 98
- Position: Nose tackle

Personal information
- Born: March 1, 1985 (age 41); Miami, Florida, U.S.
- Listed height: 6 ft 1 in (1.85 m)
- Listed weight: 315 lb (143 kg)

Career information
- High school: Miami Central (West Little River, Florida)
- College: Carson-Newman

Career history
- Miami Dolphins (2008)*; Green Bay Packers (2008–2009); Kansas City Chiefs (2010–2013)
- * Offseason or practice squad member only

Awards and highlights
- First-team All-SAC (2007); 2× Second-team All-SAC (2005, 2006)

Career statistics
- Total tackles: 15
- Stats at Pro Football Reference

Anthony Terrell Toribio (born March 1, 1985) is an American former professional football player. He was a defensive tackle signed by the Miami Dolphins as an undrafted free agent in 2008 and also was on the practice squad for the Green Bay Packers. He played for the Kansas City Chiefs from 2010 to 2013. He played college football at Carson-Newman University in Jefferson City, Tennessee.
