= Shawn Murphy (American football) =

American football player (born 1982)

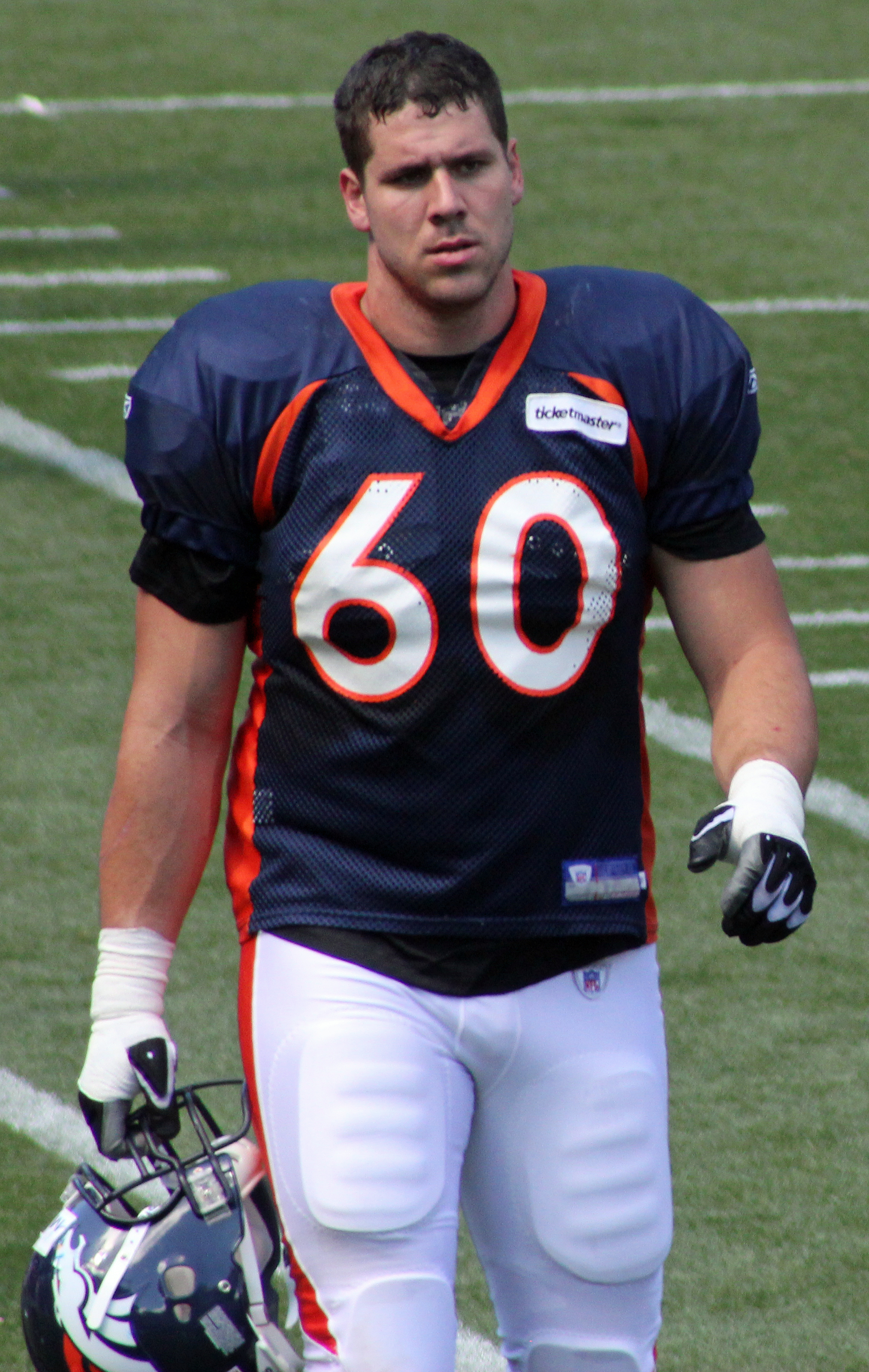
- Murphy with the Denver Broncos in 2011

No. 60, 74
- Position: Guard

Personal information
- Born: December 17, 1982 (age 43); Atlanta, Georgia, U.S.
- Listed height: 6 ft 4 in (1.93 m)
- Listed weight: 319 lb (145 kg)

Career information
- High school: Lone Peak (Highland, Utah)
- College: Utah State
- NFL draft: 2008: 4th round, 110th overall pick

Career history
- Miami Dolphins (2008–2009); Tampa Bay Buccaneers (2009); Philadelphia Eagles (2010)*; Carolina Panthers (2010)*; Denver Broncos (2011)*
- * Offseason or practice squad member only

Career NFL statistics
- Games played: 1
- Stats at Pro Football Reference

Shawn Murphy (born December 17, 1982) is an American former professional football player who was a guard in the National Football League (NFL). He played college football for the Utah State Aggies and was selected 110th overall by the Miami Dolphins in the fourth round of the 2008 NFL draft.

Murphy was also a member of the Tampa Bay Buccaneers, Carolina Panthers, and Denver Broncos. He is the son of former Major League Baseball player Dale Murphy.

== College career ==
He played one year of college football at Ricks College before going on a two-year Mormon mission in Brazil; on his return, he attended several schools including Dixie State College of Utah before finishing at Utah State University, where he earned academic all-conference honors. As a senior in 2007, he earned one of the top consistency grades of any player at his position in the collegiate ranks. He led all WAC offensive linemen with 137 knockdown blocks while also only allowing one quarterback sack. As a result, he received All-American honorable mention and All-WAC second-team recognition.
