= Trey Darilek =

American gridiron football player (born 1981)

No. 66
- Position: Guard

Personal information
- Born: April 23, 1981 (age 45); San Antonio, Texas, U.S.
- Listed height: 6 ft 5 in (1.96 m)
- Listed weight: 310 lb (141 kg)

Career information
- High school: Lee (San Antonio)
- College: UTEP
- NFL draft: 2004: 4th round, 131st overall pick

Career history
- Philadelphia Eagles (2004–2005); Miami Dolphins (2006); Dallas Cowboys (2007)*; Edmonton Eskimos (2007); Miami Dolphins (2008)*; Jacksonville Jaguars (2008)
- * Offseason or practice squad member only

Awards and highlights
- First-team All-WAC (2003)

Career NFL statistics
- Games played: 18
- Stats at Pro Football Reference

Trey Keith Darilek (born April 23, 1981) is an American former professional football player who was a guard in the National Football League (NFL). He was selected by the Philadelphia Eagles in the fourth round of the 2004 NFL draft. He played college football for the UTEP Miners.

Darilek was also a member of the Miami Dolphins, Dallas Cowboys, Edmonton Eskimos and Jacksonville Jaguars.

== College career ==
Darilek played college football at the University of Texas at El Paso, where he started 42 games and was an All-WAC first-team selection as a senior.

== Professional career ==
=== Philadelphia Eagles ===
Darilek was a fourth round selection (131st overall) by the Philadelphia Eagles in the 2004 NFL draft and saw limited action in 2004 and 2005. He was cut by the Eagles before the 2006 season.

=== Dallas Cowboys ===
Darilek was later signed by the Dallas Cowboys and played in their preseason games until he was cut along with many other Cowboys players in late August 2007.

=== Miami Dolphins ===
Darilek also played for the Miami Dolphins during the 2008 preseason but was released afterwards as part of the roster cutdown requirements.

=== Edmonton Eskimos ===
Trey was signed by the Edmonton Eskimos of the Canadian Football League as a free agent on September 11. He played five games at center for the team.
