= Junior Glymph =

American football player (born 1980)

No. 93, 92
- Position: Linebacker

Personal information
- Born: September 2, 1980 (age 46); Hackensack, New Jersey, U.S.
- Listed height: 6 ft 5 in (1.96 m)
- Listed weight: 270 lb (122 kg)

Career information
- High school: Newberry (SC)
- College: Carson–Newman
- NFL draft: 2004: undrafted

Career history
- Green Bay Packers (2004)*; Atlanta Falcons (2004–2005); Dallas Cowboys (2005); Baltimore Ravens (2006)*; Pittsburgh Steelers (2006)*; Dallas Cowboys (2006); Miami Dolphins (2008)*
- * Offseason or practice squad member only

Awards and highlights
- 3× All-SIAC (2000, 2002, 2003)

Career NFL statistics
- Games played: 8
- Total tackles: 10
- Sacks: 1
- Pass deflections: 1
- Stats at Pro Football Reference

Clarence Glymph Jr. (born September 2, 1980) is an American former professional football player who was a linebacker and defensive end in the National Football League (NFL). He played for the Atlanta Falcons, Dallas Cowboys, Baltimore Ravens, and Pittsburgh Steelers of the National Football League (NFL). He played college football for the Carson–Newman Eagles.

== Early life ==
Glymph attended Newberry High School, where he played football, basketball and track. He received All-region honors as a senior.

He accepted a football scholarship from Carson-Newman University, where he played defensive end. As a sophomore, he tallied 36 tackles and 7 sacks. In 2001, he was granted a medical redshirt after injuring his ankle in the season opener.

As a junior, he registered, 57 tackles and 8 sacks. As a senior, he recorded 44 tackles (13.5 for loss), 11 sacks, 2 forced fumbles and one blocked kick. He finished his college career with 25 starts, 173 tackles and 27 sacks.

== Professional career ==
=== Green Bay Packers ===
Glymph was signed by the Green Bay Packers as an undrafted free agent after the 2004 NFL draft. He was waived on July 29.

=== Atlanta Falcons ===
On August 5, 2004, he was signed by the Atlanta Falcons. On September 4, he was released and signed to the practice squad the next day. On October 16, he was promoted to the active roster. He was declared inactive in 6 games. On December 25, he was cut and signed to the practice squad two days later. He finished with 5 tackles and one sack.

On September 4, 2005, he was cut and later signed to the practice squad. He was promoted to the active roster on November 19 and was released 5 days later and added to the practice squad. He posted 5 tackles.

=== Dallas Cowboys (first stint) ===
On December 13, 2005, he was signed by the Dallas Cowboys from the Falcons practice squad. He was declared inactive for the last two games.

In 2006, he was converted into an outside linebacker in the team's 3-4 defense. He had a notable preseason game against the Seattle Seahawks registering 2 sacks, although they could be described as fortuitous, because he was aligned in the wrong place. He also tallied in the same contest 2 forced fumbles and one quarterback pressure. He was cut on September 2.

=== Baltimore Ravens ===
In 2006 after his release, Glymph was signed to the practice squad of the Baltimore Ravens, where he remained for two weeks.

=== Pittsburgh Steelers ===
On October 11, 2006, he was signed by the Pittsburgh Steelers to the practice squad, with the plan of moving him back to defensive end.

=== Dallas Cowboys (second stint) ===
On October 20, 2006, he was signed by the Dallas Cowboys from the Steelers' practice squad, to provide depth for an injured Jason Hatcher. He was declared inactive in 8 games. He was cut on September 1, 2007, to make room for Justin Rogers.

=== Miami Dolphins ===
On January 30, 2008, he was signed by the Miami Dolphins as a free agent. He was released on August 30.
