= Titus Brown (American football) =

American football player (born 1986)

No. 59
- Position: Linebacker

Personal information
- Born: March 27, 1986 (age 40); Tuscaloosa, Alabama, U.S.
- Listed height: 6 ft 3 in (1.91 m)
- Listed weight: 250 lb (113 kg)

Career information
- High school: Hillcrest (Tuscaloosa)
- College: Mississippi State
- NFL draft: 2008: undrafted

Career history
- Miami Dolphins (2008)*; Cleveland Browns (2008–2010); Denver Broncos (2010)*; Cleveland Browns (2010–2011)
- * Offseason or practice squad member only

Awards and highlights
- 2× Second-team All-SEC (2006, 2007); Freshman All-SEC (2004)

Career NFL statistics
- Games played: 28
- Total tackles: 23
- Sacks: 1
- Stats at Pro Football Reference

Titus Markeith Brown (born March 27, 1986) is an American former professional football player who was a linebacker in the National Football League (NFL). He played college football for the Mississippi State Bulldogs, recording 18.5 career sacks, seventh on MSU's all-time leaderboard. Brown was signed by the Miami Dolphins as an undrafted free agent in 2008. He played in the NFL for the Cleveland Browns from 2008 to 2010, except for a short stint with the Denver Broncos.
