= Capital Brewery =

Brewery in Middleton, Wisconsin

Coordinates: 43.094868°N 89.516261°W

- Capital Brewery's Logo
- Industry: Alcoholic beverage
- Founded: 1984
- Founder: Ed Janus
- Headquarters: Middleton, Wisconsin; United States
- Products: Beer
- Website: capitalbrewery.com

Capital Brewery is a brewery in Middleton, Wisconsin. Founded on March 14, 1984, by Ed Janus in Madison, Wisconsin, it is now situated in a former egg processing plant. It is one of the oldest craft breweries in the United States.

== History ==
The company began production in 1986 and now produces over 20,000 barrels of beer annually. It is considered one of the oldest craft breweries in the United States.

The company's brews have won awards at a number of competitions, including the Great American Beer Festival, and The Great Taste of the Midwest. The brewery received a Reader's Choice Award from 1998 to 2004 for being Madison's Favorite Local/Regional Beer in The Capital Times/Wisconsin State Journals annual contest. The company has received over 240 awards in both domestic and international competitions in over 15 categories.

Capital Brewery was named "America's #1 Rated Brewery" by the Beverage Testing Institute's World Beer Championships in 1998. The brewery was also rated #7 in the world at this time.

In 2008, the brewery teamed up with fellow brewery Great Dane Brewing Company to try to make the world's strongest beer, while following the Reinheitsgebot German beer purity law.

Capital was named the Grand National Champion in the 2013 US Open Beer Championship, winning six medals.

== Beers produced ==
=== Annual ===
- Supper Club
- Special Pilsner
- Wisconsin Amber
- Capital Dark
- Mutiny IPA (Capital Brewery's First India Pale Ale)
- Island Wheat

=== Seasonal ===
- Maibock - Available March - May
- Lake House - Available June - July
- Oktoberfest - Available August - October
- Autumnal Fire September - December
- Winter Skal - Available November - Feb.

=== Limited release (some are included in the 'Capital Square Series') ===
- Blonde Dopplebock (Winter/Spring)
- Fishin' in the Dark (Summer)
- Dark Dopplebock (Fall/Winter)
- Jobu (Brown Ale aged in rum barrels - Winter)
- Capital Coffee Dark (Coffee/vanilla infused Munich Dark)

=== Beers in hibernation ===
- Bavarian Lager
- Brown Ale - Went into hibernation in Spring 2009 (except for an occasional appearance as Jobu)
- Capital 1900 - Hibernating since 2006.
- Hop Cream
- Weizen
- U.S. Pale Ale
- Dark Voyage (dark IPA)
- Ghost Ship (white IPA)
- Grateful IPA (red IPA)
- Jacked Maibock (Spring)
- Capsized
- Appleanche (Fall)
- Pumpkinataur (Fall)
- Eternal Flame (Fall/Winter)
- Schwarz in a Box (Fall/Winter)
