= Cross Plains, Wisconsin =

- Village
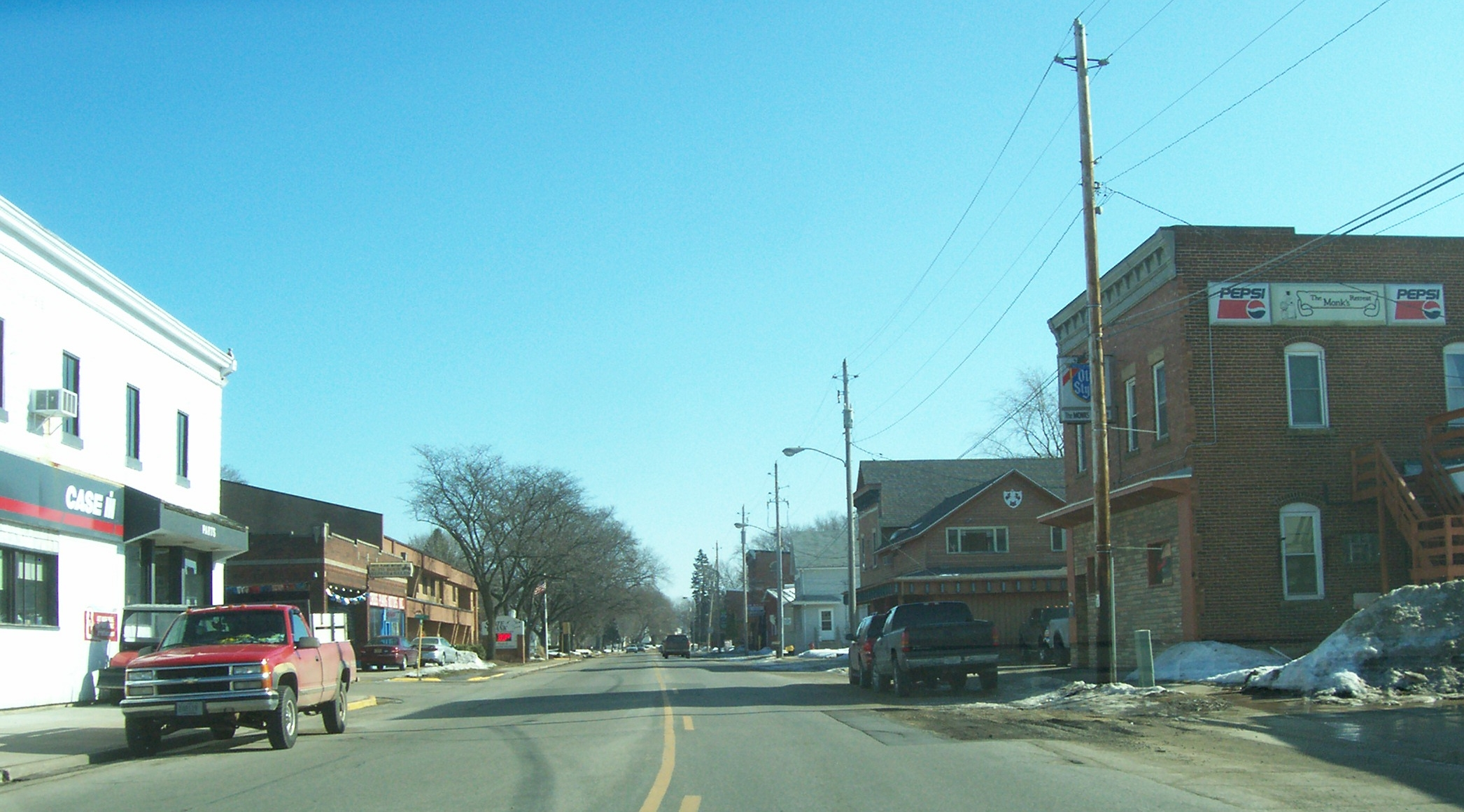
- Looking east at downtown Cross Plains on U.S. 14
- Motto: "Famous for Friendliness"
- Location of Cross Plains in Dane County, Wisconsin.
- Coordinates: 43°5′41″N 89°39′40″W
- Country: United States
- State: Wisconsin
- County: Dane

Area
  - Total: 1.80 sq mi (4.66 km^{2})
  - Land: 1.80 sq mi (4.66 km^{2})
  - Water: 0 sq mi (0.00 km^{2})
- Elevation: 938 ft (286 m)

Population (2020)
  - Total: 4,104
  - Density: 2,380.4/sq mi (919.08/km^{2})
- Time zone: UTC-6 (Central (CST))
  - Summer (DST): UTC-5 (CDT)
- Area code: 608
- FIPS code: 55-17800
- GNIS feature ID: 1583029
- Website: cross-plains.wi.us

Cross Plains is a village in Dane County, Wisconsin, United States. The population was 4,104 at the 2020 census. The village is located partially within the Town of Cross Plains. It is part of the Madison Metropolitan Statistical Area.

== History ==
Cross Plains was named by a settler for his home in Cross Plains, Tennessee. The village was incorporated in 1920.

== Geography ==
Cross Plains is located at 43°6′51″N 89°38′40″W (43.114407, -89.644503).

According to the United States Census Bureau, the village has a total area of 1.76 square miles (4.56 km^{2}), all land.

== Demographics ==
Historical population
Census	Pop.	Note	%±
1880	42		—
1930	302		—
1940	374		23.8%
1950	464		24.1%
1960	1,066		129.7%
1970	1,478		38.6%
1980	2,156		45.9%
1990	2,098		−2.7%
2000	3,084		47.0%
2010	3,538		14.7%
2020	4,104		16.0%
U.S. Decennial Census

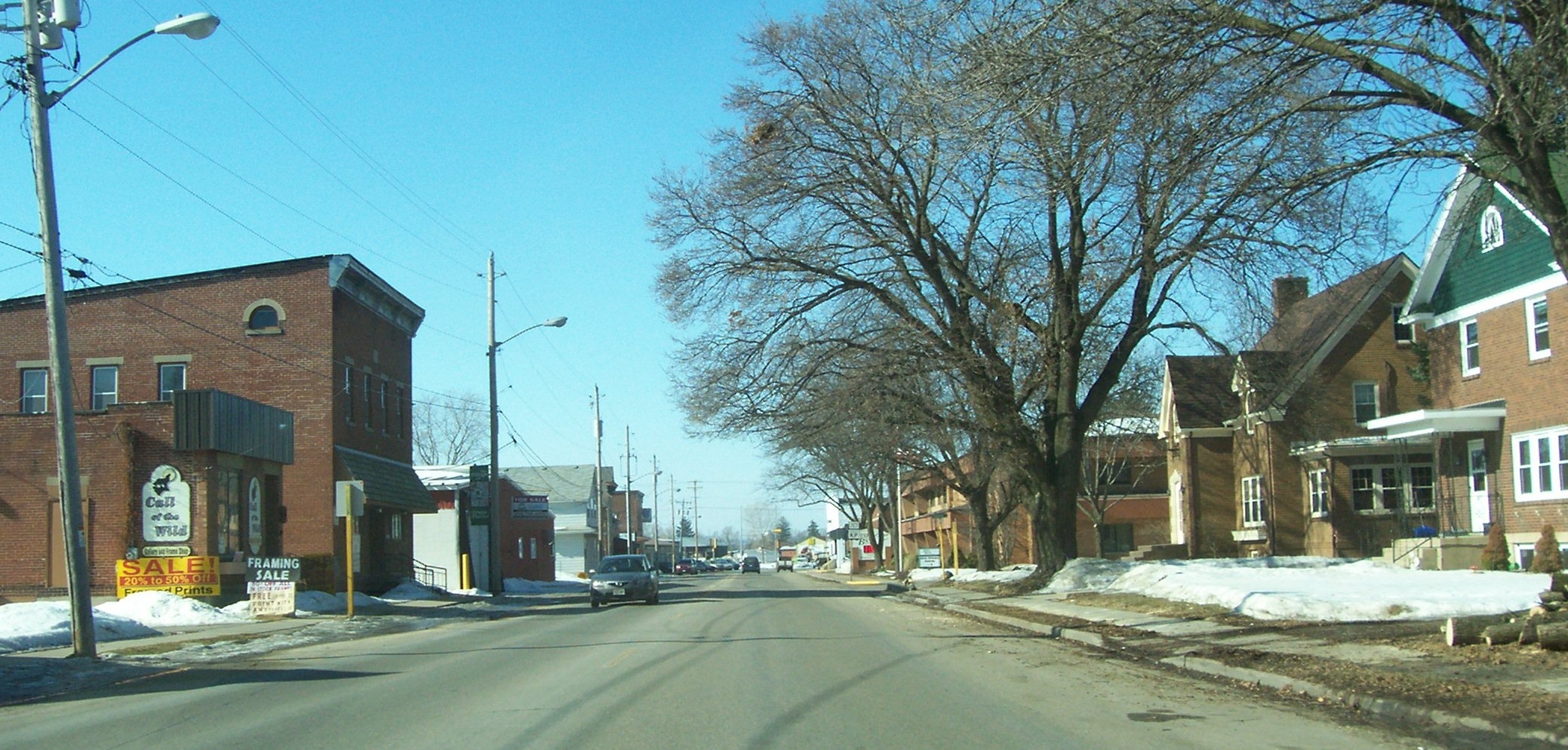
Looking west at downtown Cross Plains

=== 2010 census ===
As of the census of 2010, there were 3,538 people, 1,386 households, and 966 families living in the village. The population density was 2,010.2 inhabitants per square mile (776.1/km^{2}). There were 1,452 housing units at an average density of 825.0 units per square mile (318.5 units/km^{2}). The racial makeup of the village was 97.1% White, 0.8% African American, 0.2% Native American, 0.6% Asian, 0.3% from other races, and 1.0% from two or more races. Hispanic or Latino of any race were 1.6% of the population.

There were 1,386 households, of which 37.4% had children under the age of 18 living with them, 56.1% were married couples living together, 9.2% had a female householder with no husband present, 4.4% had a male householder with no wife present, and 30.3% were non-families. 23.8% of all households were made up of individuals, and 5.9% had someone living alone who was 65 years of age or older. The average household size was 2.55 and the average family size was 3.04.

The median age in the village was 36.8 years. 27.4% of residents were under the age of 18; 7.3% were between the ages of 18 and 24; 28.6% were from 25 to 44; 27.4% were from 45 to 64; and 9.2% were 65 years of age or older. The gender makeup of the village was 49.8% male and 50.2% female.

=== 2000 census ===
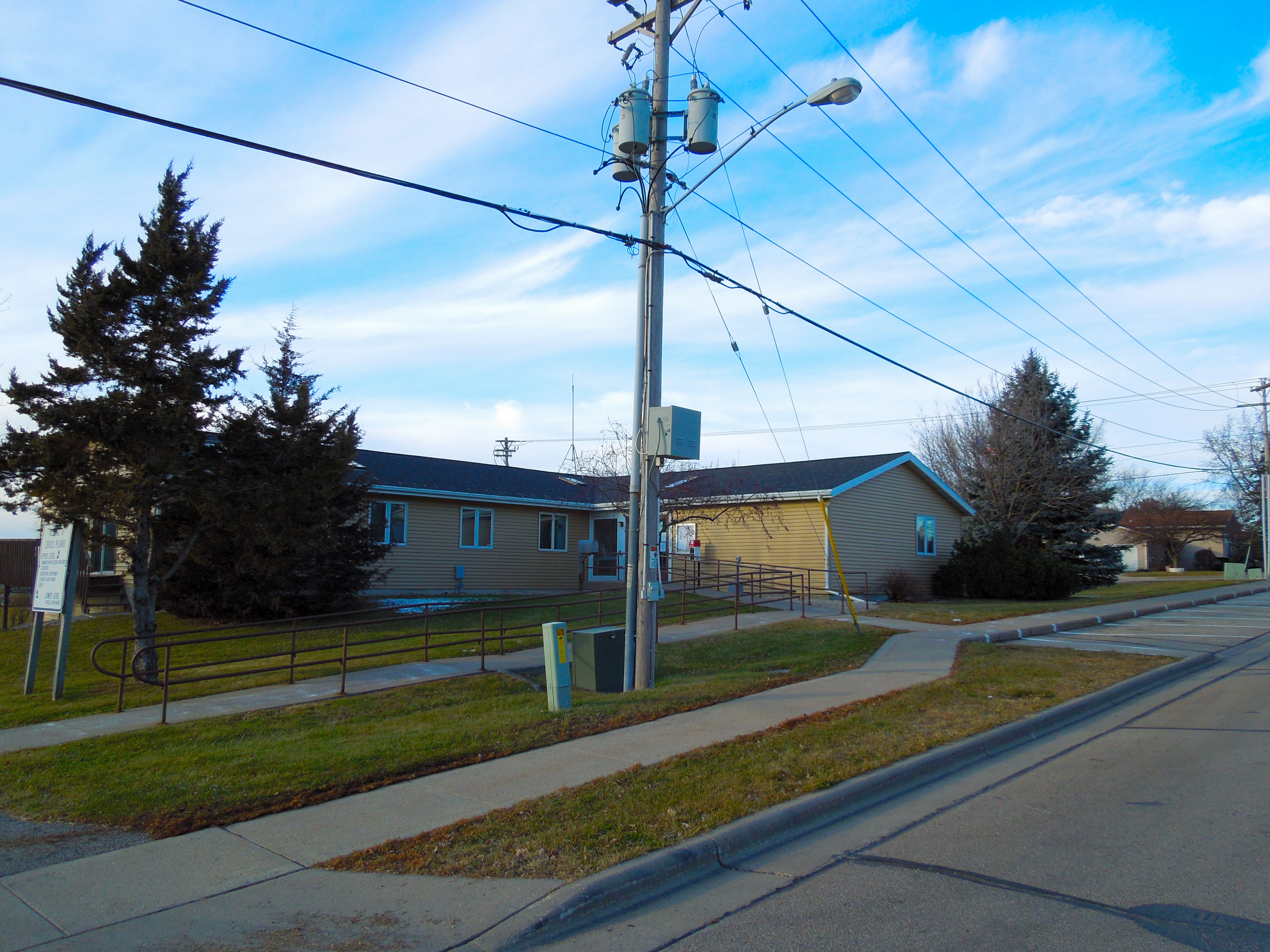
Cross Plains Village Hall

As of the census of 2000, there were 3,084 people, 1,199 households, and 851 families living in the village. The population density was 2,625.0 people per square mile (1,013.5 people/km^{2}). There were 1,228 housing units at an average density of 1,045.2 units per square mile (403.6 units/km^{2}). The racial makeup of the village was 98.80% White, 0.23% Black or African American, 0.13% Native American, 0.16% Asian, 0.03% Pacific Islander, 0.03% from other races, and 0.62% from two or more races. 0.42% of the population were Hispanic or Latino of any race.

There were 1,199 households, out of which 39.3% had children under the age of 18 living with them, 58.1% were married couples living together, 9.2% had a female householder with no husband present, and 29.0% were non-families. 22.8% of all households were made up of individuals, and 5.9% had someone living alone who was 65 years of age or older. The average household size was 2.56 and the average family size was 3.05.

In the village, the population was spread out, with 28.5% under the age of 18, 7.2% from 18 to 24, 35.2% from 25 to 44, 20.7% from 45 to 64, and 8.4% who were 65 years of age or older. The median age was 34 years. For every 100 females, there were 98.5 males. For every 100 females age 18 and over, there were 96.4 males.

The median income for a household in the village was $56,629, and the median income for a family was $62,500. Males had a median income of $40,525 versus $29,632 for females. The per capita income for the village was $23,894. About 1.0% of families and 2.6% of the population were below the poverty line, including 3.3% of those under age 18 and 3.4% of those age 65 or over.

== Education ==
Cross Plains belongs to the Middleton-Cross Plains Area School District. There are seven elementary schools, two middle schools, one high school and one alternative senior high school in the district.

For high school students attend either Middleton High School or Clark Street Community School.

St. Francis Xavier Catholic School in Cross Plains, founded in 1857, educates students from grades K-8.

== Notable people ==
- Connie Grob, longtime minor league pitcher who spent one season in the majors with Washington
- Jeffrey S. Grob, Roman Catholic bishop
- Matt Lepay, sports announcer
- Matthew Anderson, member of Wisconsin State Assembly and Wisconsin State Senate
