= Ryan Groy =

American football player (born 1990)

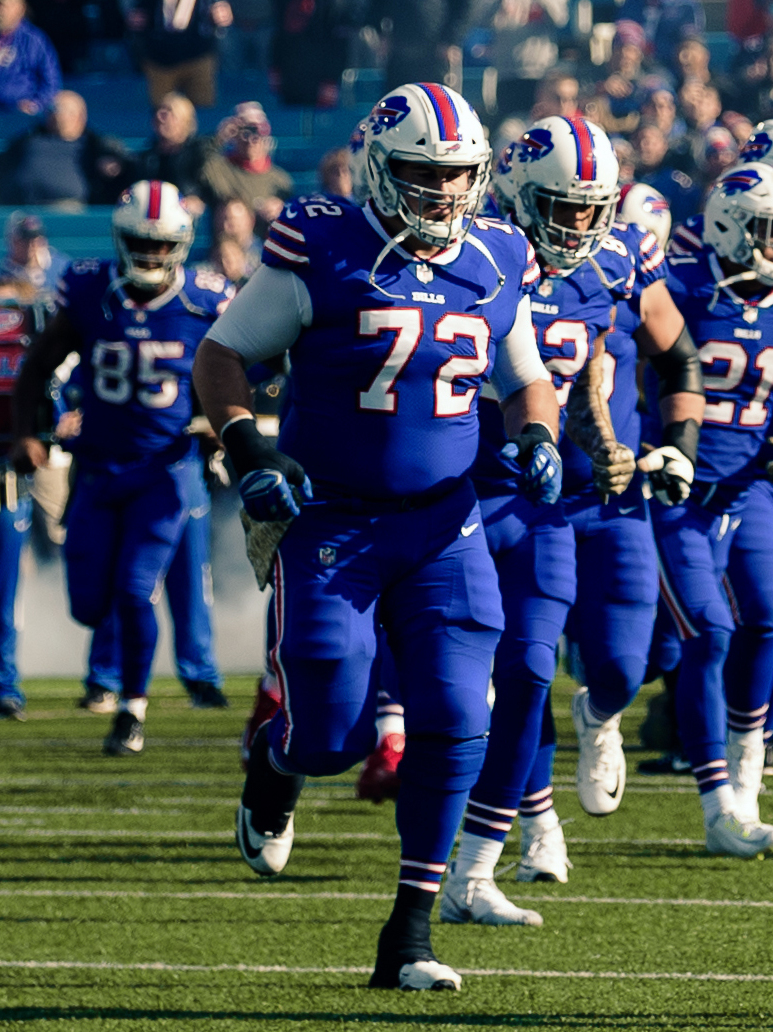
- Groy with the Buffalo Bills in 2018

No. 79, 72
- Positions: Center, guard

Personal information
- Born: September 30, 1990 (age 36); Middleton, Wisconsin, U.S.
- Listed height: 6 ft 5 in (1.96 m)
- Listed weight: 320 lb (145 kg)

Career information
- High school: Middleton
- College: Wisconsin
- NFL draft: 2014: undrafted

Career history
- Chicago Bears (2014); New England Patriots (2015); Tampa Bay Buccaneers (2015)*; Buffalo Bills (2015–2018); New Orleans Saints (2019)*; Los Angeles Chargers (2019–2020)
- * Offseason or practice squad member only

Awards and highlights
- First-team All-Big Ten (2013); Second-team All-Big Ten (2012)

Career NFL statistics
- Games played: 68
- Games started: 20
- Stats at Pro Football Reference

Ryan Groy (born September 30, 1990) is an American former professional football player who was a center in the National Football League (NFL). He was signed as an undrafted free agent by the Chicago Bears in 2014. He played college football for the Wisconsin Badgers.

== College career ==
Groy is a Wisconsin native. He redshirted for the Badgers in 2009, and set a school record by playing all 54 games of his career. He played 13 games in 2010, starting two at fullback. In 2011, he played 14 games, starting four (three at left guard, one at center). He started all 14 games in 2012 (12 at left guard, two at left tackle), and all 13 games at left guard in 2013.

== Professional career ==
Pre-draft measurables
Height	Weight	Arm length	Hand span	40-yard dash	20-yard shuttle	Three-cone drill	Vertical jump	Broad jump	Bench press
6 ft 4 5/8 in (1.95 m)	316 lb (143 kg)	33 1/4 in (0.84 m)	10 3/8 in (0.26 m)	5.19 s	4.47 s	7.49 s	26.5 in (0.67 m)	9 ft 0 in (2.74 m)	26 reps
All values from NFL Combine

=== Chicago Bears ===
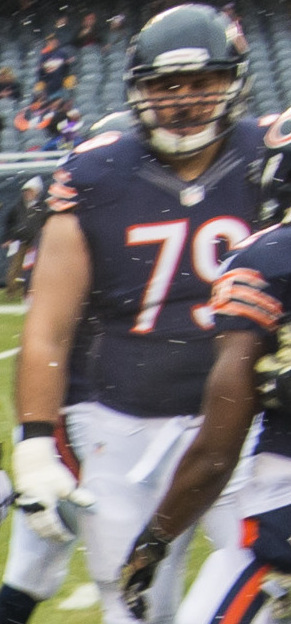
Groy with the Bears in 2014

Groy was signed as an undrafted free agent to the Chicago Bears on May 11, 2014. He was then moved to the practice squad on September 1. On November 10, he was promoted to the active roster.

=== New England Patriots ===
On August 10, 2015, Groy was traded to the New England Patriots for Matthew Wells. On September 4, 2015, Groy was waived by the Patriots with an injury designation.

=== Tampa Bay Buccaneers ===
On October 28, 2015, Groy was signed to the Buccaneers' practice squad.

=== Buffalo Bills ===
On November 25, 2015 Groy was signed by Buffalo Bills off the Buccaneers' practice squad. He started multiple games at center in relief of an injured Eric Wood at the end of the 2016 season.

Set to be a restricted free agent in 2017, the Bills placed an original round tender on Groy. The Los Angeles Rams signed him to a two-year offer sheet on March 14, 2017, giving the Bills five days to match the offer or lose him to the Rams. On March 17, 2017, the Bills matched the Rams' offer, keeping him with the Bills under a two-year contract.

In 2018, Groy was named the Bills' starting center to begin the season following the retirement of Eric Wood and beating out veteran Russell Bodine. He started the first two games before being benched for Week 3 in favor of Bodine. He was re-named the starter in Week 14 following a season-ending injury to Bodine.

=== New Orleans Saints ===
On May 22, 2019, Groy was signed by the New Orleans Saints. He was released during final roster cuts on August 30, 2019.

=== Los Angeles Chargers ===
On October 9, 2019, Groy was signed by the Los Angeles Chargers.

Groy re-signed with the Chargers on May 20, 2020. He was released on September 5, 2020, and signed to the practice squad the next day. He was elevated to the active roster on September 12 for the team's week 1 game against the Cincinnati Bengals, and reverted to the practice squad a day after the game. He was promoted to the active roster on September 26, 2020. He started three games at right guard in place of an injured Trai Turner before being placed on injured reserve on October 29, 2020, while also testing positive for COVID-19. He was moved back to injured reserve from the COVID-19 list on December 30.
