= Otto F. Toepfer =

American politician

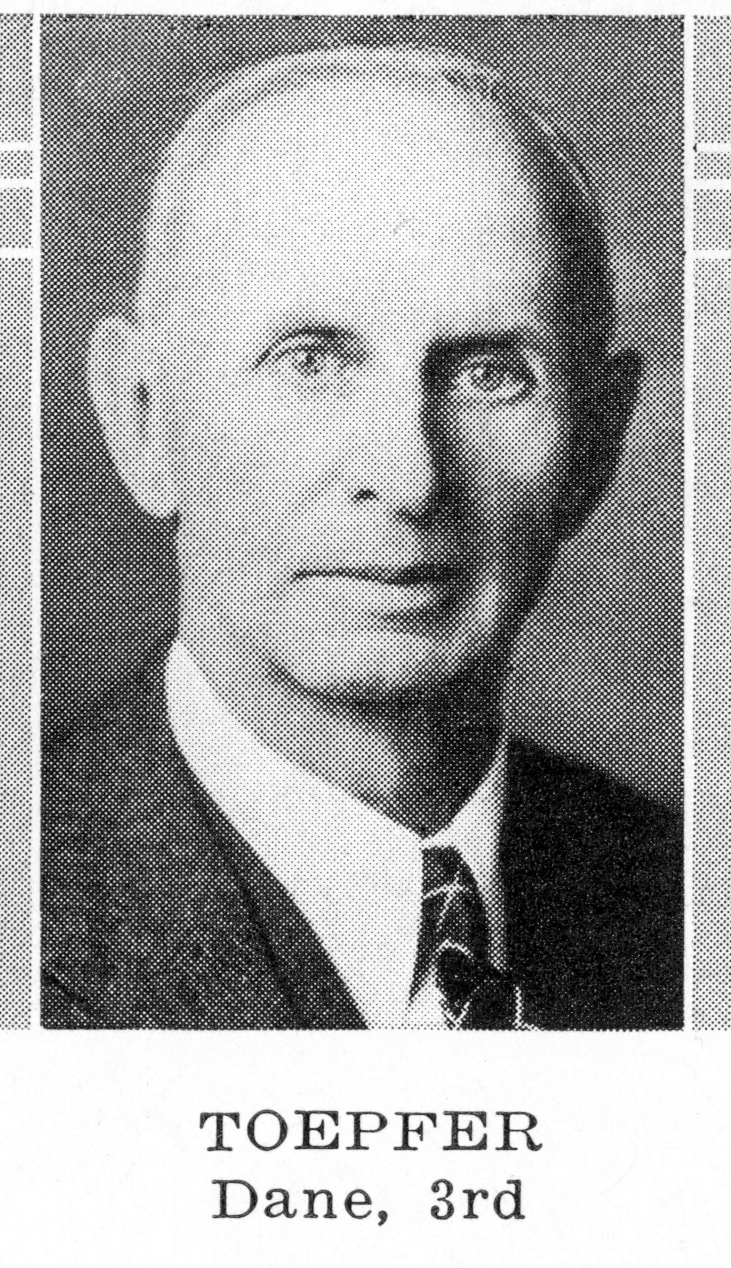
Otto Toepfer

Otto Carl Franz Toepfer (January 13, 1872 – February 17, 1949) was a member of the Wisconsin State Assembly.

== Biography ==
Toepfer was born in Middleton, Wisconsin. He died on February 17, 1949.

== Career ==
Toepfer was a member of the Assembly from 1939 to 1940. He was a farmer and was involved with agricultural and cattle raising associations. He was a director of a bank and a trust company. He was a Republican. He served on the Madison and Middleton town boards and was also on the Dane County, Wisconsin Board of Supervisors.
