= Ed Janus =

- Born: 1945 (age 80–81) Washington, D.C.
- Occupation: Writer, audio journalist and oral historian

Ed Janus is a writer, independent audio journalist and oral historian. He has lived in Madison, Wisconsin for over 40 years where he is well known for having brought baseball and world-renowned beers to that city.

Janus was born in Washington, D.C., in 1945 and was graduated from Lake Forest College in 1968 with honors for his thesis on the dramaturgy of political demonstrations.

Janus was a member of the Phoenix Fellowship, a group whose members were well known in Madison as the creators of the Ovens of Brittany and Bakers Rooms, restaurants that changed the landscape of food in Madison.

In the early 1980s Janus led a group that brought professional, small town baseball back to Madison after an absence of 40 years. Madison Muskies Baseball became more than a game; it became a summertime outlet for community-based zaniness. So popular were the games and the zaniness, that CBS Nightly News, CNN and National Public Radio reported on them.

While he served as the general manager of the Muskies, Janus was working on developing a small, local brewery. At the time (1983–84), he and his partners were able to raise more than $1.5 million from state residents in a most unusual stock offering – an IPO connected only to a business plan, not an ongoing business.

Capital Brewery in Middleton, Wisconsin brewed its first beers in 1986. In 1998 it was named as the top brewery in the U.S. and seventh best in the world, at the Beverage Testing Institute's World Beer Championships in Chicago.

In 1990, Janus began his career as an interviewer, writer and audio journalist. Since then he has interviewed hundreds of people on topics covering education policy, the environment, business, health and language.

In 1999, Janus created You're Not Alone: Conversations with Breast Cancer Survivors and Those Who Love Them, a first-person audio book which was awarded top honors by the Audio Publishers Association. In 2004, the German publishing company Langenscheidt, published Living in the U. S.: Das Praxistraining für Job und Alltag, a series of books and audio interviews with representative Americans created to help Germans understand everyday spoken American English.

In 2006, Janus began to revisit dairy farming by producing a series of first-person audio stories of dairy farmers and cheesemakers for the Wisconsin Milk Marketing Board.

A book, Creating Dairyland, (Wisconsin Historical Society Press, 2011) came out of his exploration of this “deeper soil”; a book that shows how learning to care for cows saved Wisconsin farmers from themselves, transformed them into progressives.
