= Wisconsin Trade Center =

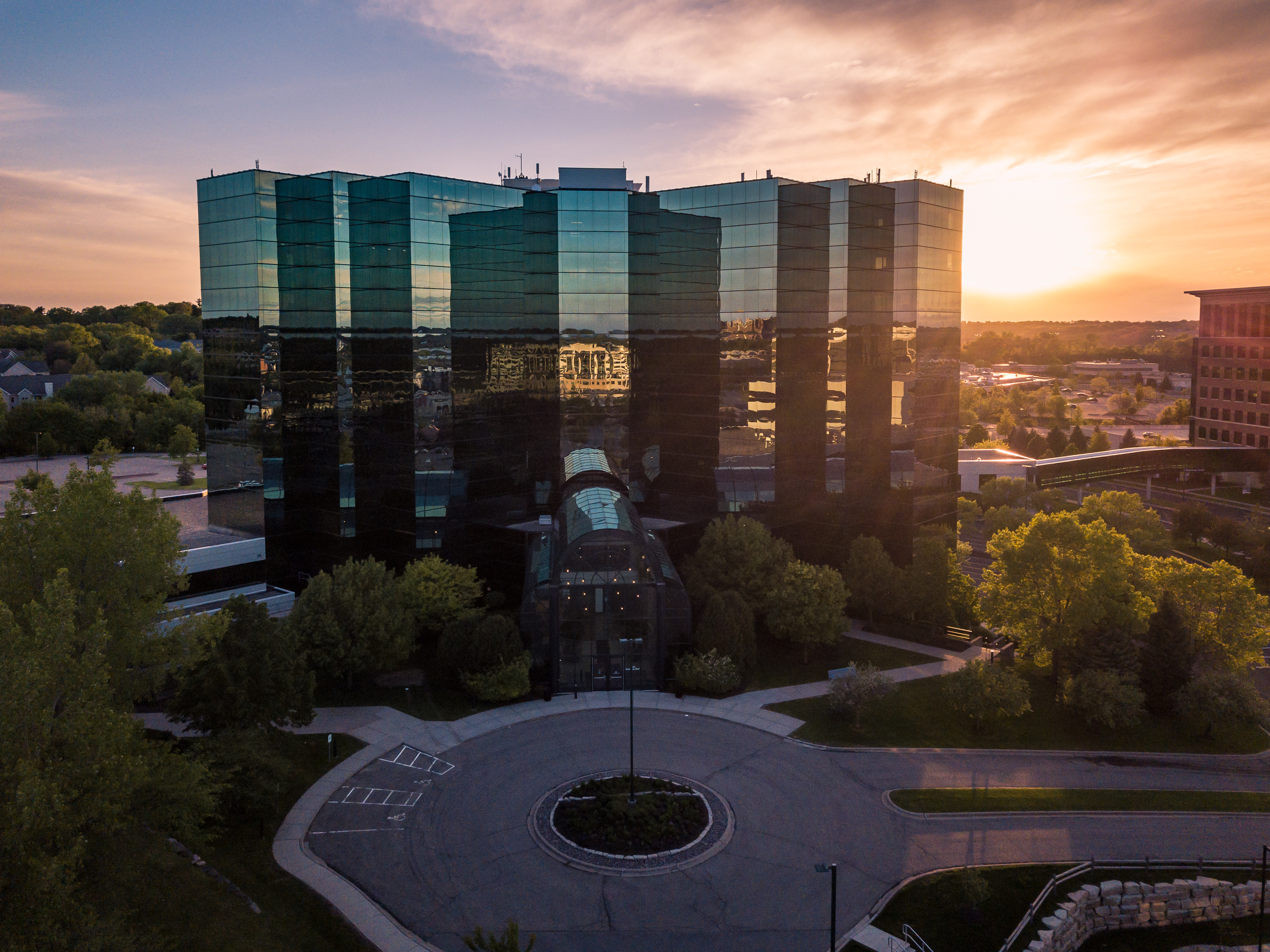
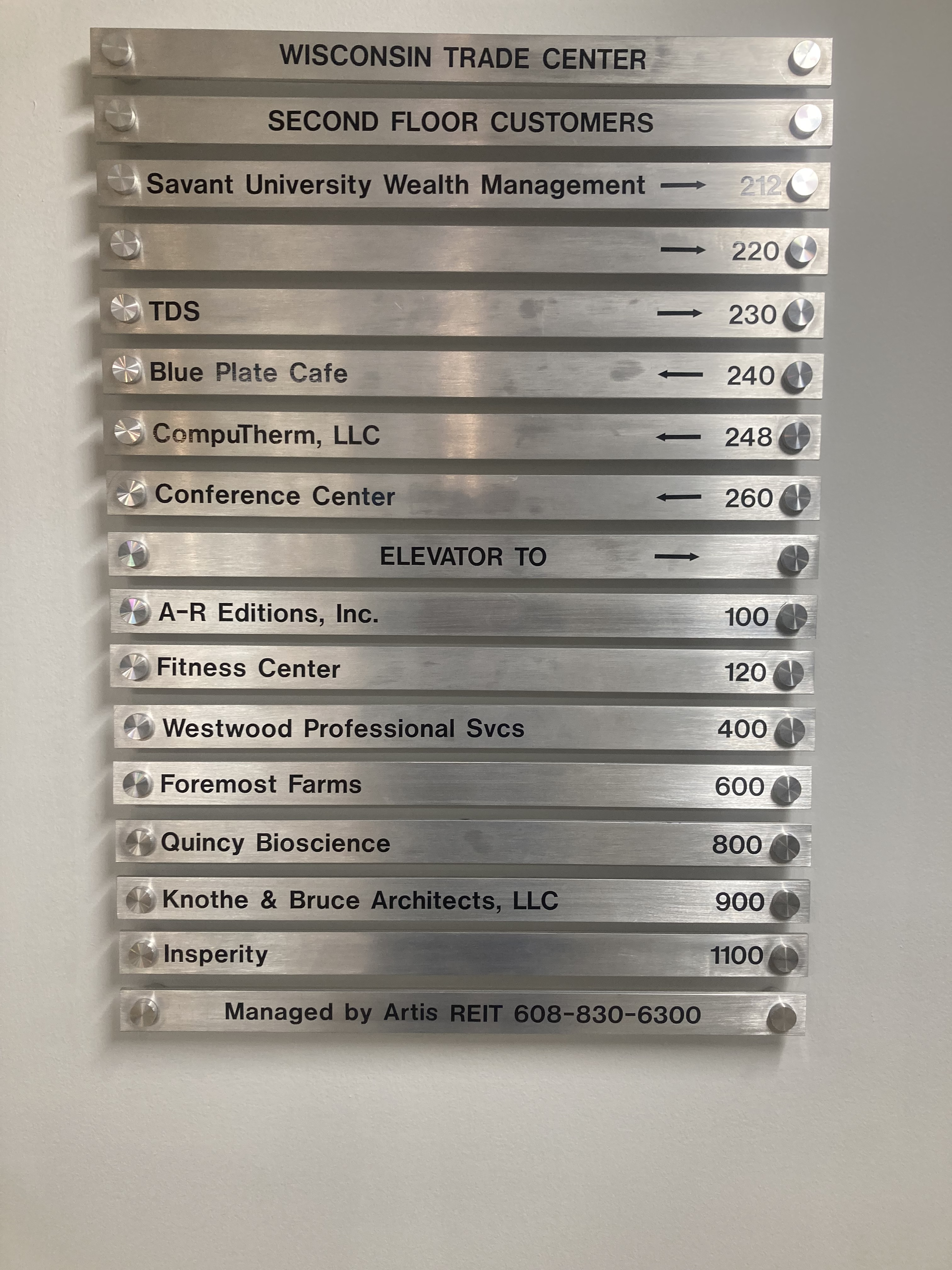
- The front view of the building. Plaque of Complete List of Tenants (as of January 2024)

General information
- Status: Completed
- Type: Low-rise
- Architectural style: Modernism
- Location: 8401 Greenway Boulevard, Middleton, Wisconsin
- Coordinates: 43.089145°N 89.529443°W

Height
- Roof: 134.17 ft (40.90 m)

Technical details
- Floor count: 10
- Floor area: 290,000 sq ft.

Design and construction
- Architect(s): Kraemer Brothers

Other information
- Parking: 954 stalls

The Wisconsin Trade Center is a low-rise commercial office building located in Middleton, Wisconsin. Standing at approximately 134 feet tall, it is the tallest building in Middleton. The building was constructed in 1999

== Amentities ==
The building is made of mostly blue glass windows. The entry room is a giant atrium/lobby made mostly of glass. It includes many conference centers, classrooms, and offices, some with card access. It also contains a full service cafeteria, where food is offered by a local catering business called Blue Plate Café. There is also a fitness center and heated, underground parking that is able to fit 954 cars. A skywalk going over Greenway Boulevard links to the nearby Greenway Building, and another connecting to the nearby Western Tower.

== Tenants ==
The following list shows the current tenants of the building:

- Insperity
- Telephone and Data Systems, Inc.
- Foremost Farms USA.
- Westwood Professional Services
- Knothe & Bruce Architects
