= Middleton High School (Wisconsin) =

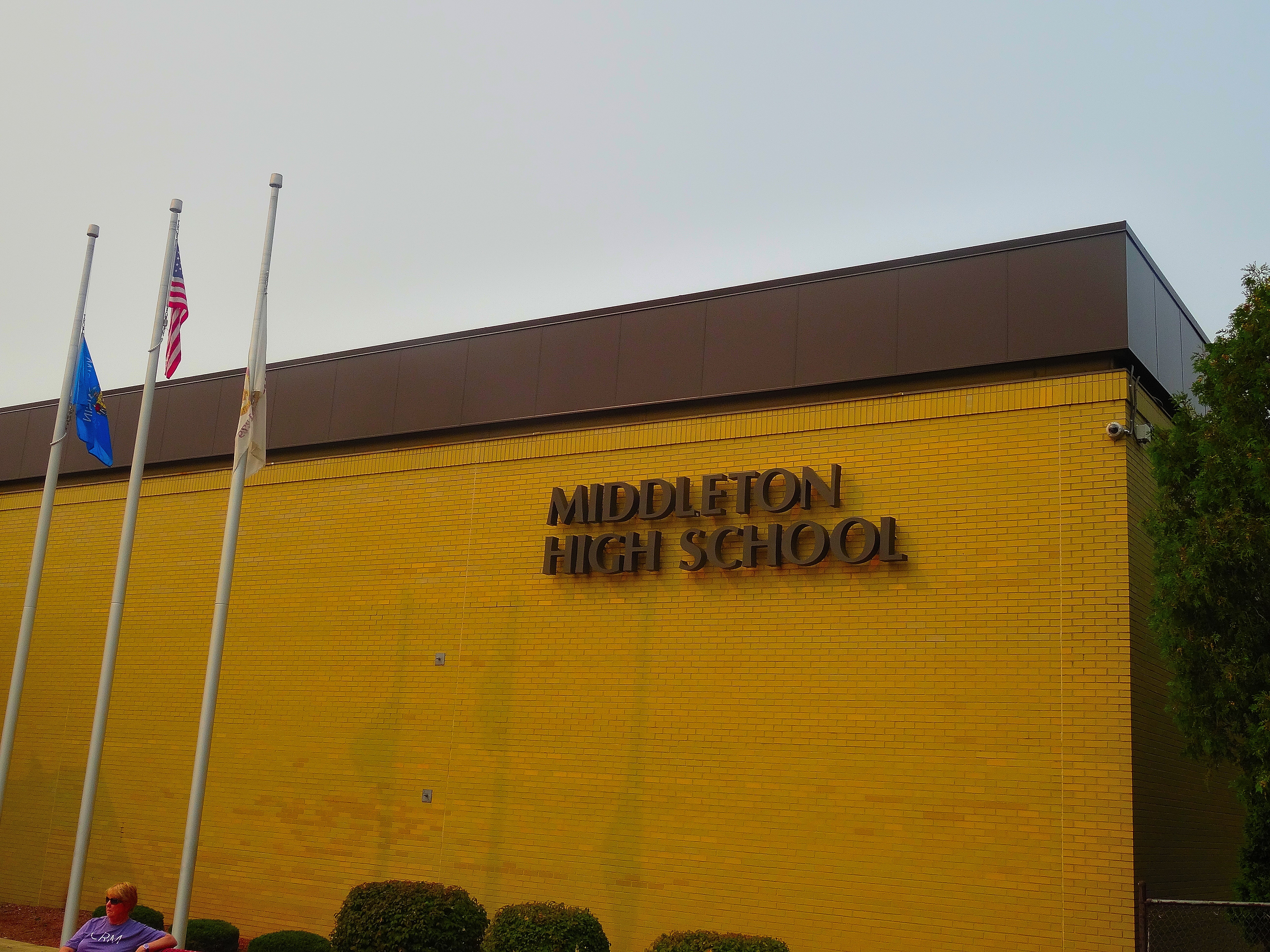

Location
- 2100 Bristol Street; Middleton, Wisconsin 53562; United States; 43°06′01″N 89°30′27″W

Information
- Type: Public secondary
- Established: 1879
- School district: Middleton-Cross Plains School District
- Principal: Bobbie Reinhart
- Staff: 151.33 (on an FTE basis)
- Grades: 9–12
- Enrollment: 2,303 (2024–2025)
- Student to teacher ratio: 14.78
- Colors: Cardinal red and white
- Nickname: Cardinals
- Accreditation: AdvancED
- Newspaper: The Cardinal Chronicle
- Website: mcpasd.k12.wi.us/mhs/

Middleton High School is a public secondary school located in the city of Middleton, Wisconsin. It was established in 1879. Part of the Middleton-Cross Plains School District, the school serves more than 2,300 students in grades 9 to 12 from the Middleton and Cross Plains areas. Middleton High School's mascot is the cardinal. The school colors are white and cardinal red. Its athletic teams play at the WIAA Division 1 level in the WIAA Big Eight Conference. Middleton High School is often praised for having highly rated STEM and athletics programs.

In 2021, in a report by U.S. News & World Report, Middleton High School was named as the best high school in Dane County and it was also named best high school out of around 540 in the state of Wisconsin.

== Extracurricular activities ==
=== Orchestras ===
Middleton High School has four school orchestras, the Cardinal Orchestra for freshmen, the Sinfonia Orchestra for sophomores and juniors, the MHS Philomusica Orchestra playing music from many different musical genres from outside the world of regular orchestra music, and the Symphony Orchestra with winds, brass, and percussionists selected from the Wind Ensemble for the full orchestra experience.

=== Bands ===
Middleton High School has four school bands: Cardinal Band for freshmen and Concert Band, Symphonic Winds, or Chamber Winds for sophomores, juniors and seniors by audition. The MHS marching band was invited to perform in London in the 2011 and 2015 New Year's Day Parade.

Wisconsin School Music Association (WSMA) State Marching Band competition:

- AAAA State Champions - 2024

=== Athletics ===
==== State championships ====
- Baseball: 2003
- Cross country (boys): 1992, 2017, 2019
- Cross country (girls): 1995, 1996, 1997, 2006, 2020*, 2021
- Football: 1983, 1987
- Golf (boys): 1993, 1997, 1998, 1999, 2011, 2026
- Golf (girls): 2009, 2015, 2019, 2020*
- Lacrosse (boys): 2003, 2015, 2024
- Rugby (co-op boys): 2018
- Snowboarding (girls): 2017, 2018, 2019, 2020, 2021
- Soccer (boys): 2004, 2023, 2024
- Soccer (girls): 2006
- Softball: 1989
- Swimming and diving (boys): 2020, 2023, 2024, 2025, 2026
- Swimming and diving (girls): 2016, 2017, 2018, 2023, 2024, 2025, 2026
- Tennis (girls): 2013, 2020*
- Track and field (girls): 1997, 1998
- Ultimate Frisbee (boys): 2024, 2025, 2026
- Ultimate Frisbee (girls/non-binary): 2022, 2023, 2025, 2026
- Volleyball (boys): 2023, 2025, 2026

(*Fall 2020 sports competed in Spring 2021 due to COVID-19)

==== Conference affiliation history ====
- Madison Suburban Conference (1926-1952)
- Badger Conference (1952-1994)
- Big Eight Conference (1994-present)

=== National Science Bowl ===
Middleton High School competes in the National Science Bowl, an academic competition ran by the United States Department of Energy. The team was founded by a member of the Class of 2021, David Jiang.

In recent years, Middleton High School's Science Bowl team has achieved notable success. The team has won Wisconsin's regional competition, held at the Milwaukee School of Engineering, and advanced to the national competition in 2021, 2023 and 2024.

Wisconsin Regional Results
Year	Member	Member	Member	Member	Member	Coach
2021	Sanjay Suresh	David Jiang	Trevor Chau	Jonah Guse	Hansen Jin	Eric Johnson
2023	Harry Jin	Owen Weisenberger	Nihar Ballamudi	Ray Feinberg	–	Raina Eddy
2024	Harry Jin	Owen Weisenberger	Ray Feinberg	Li Ying	Sieun Lee	Raina Challe

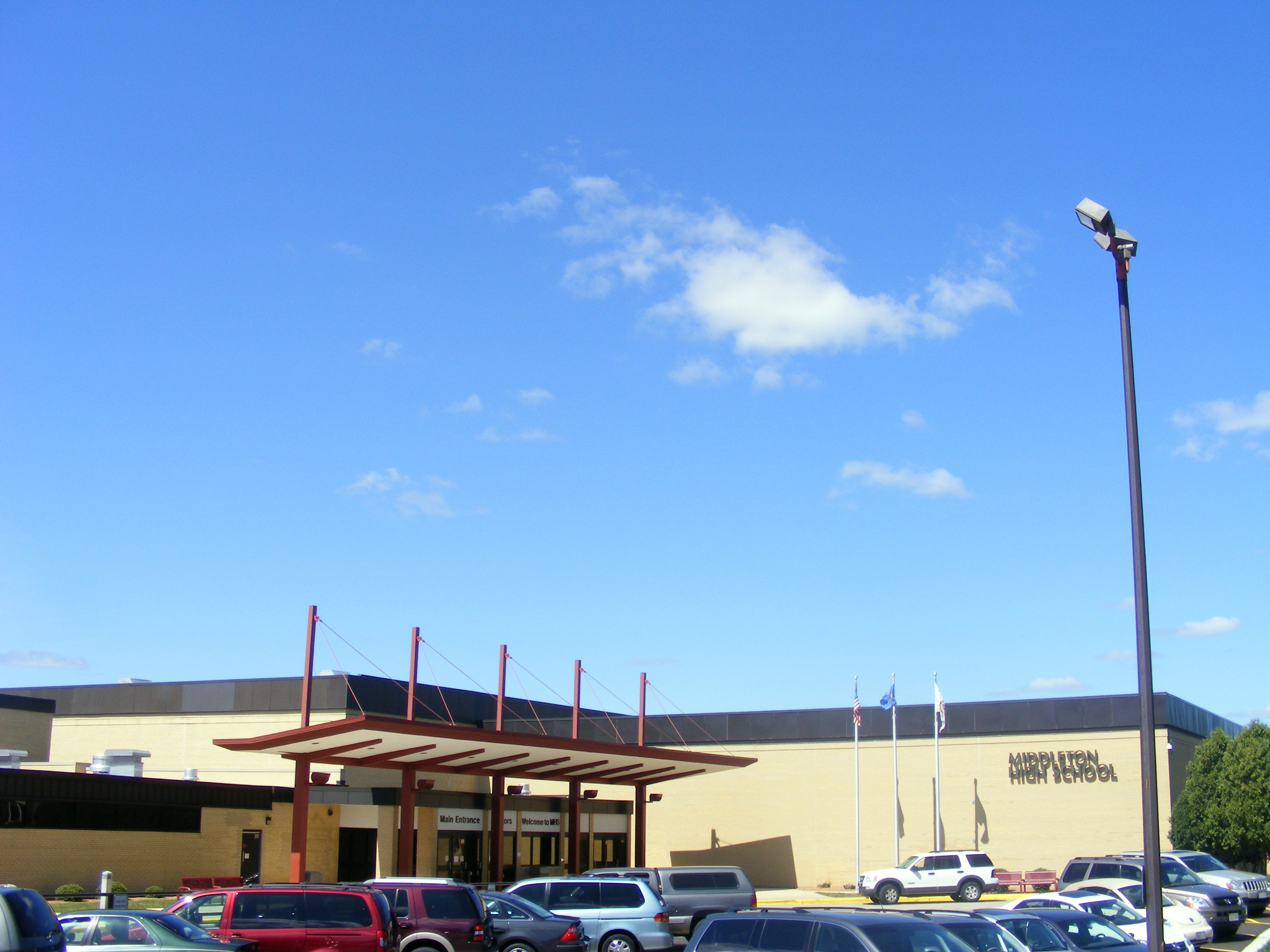
Middleton High School

== Rankings ==
List of Middleton High School's rankings
Year	Category	Title	Rank
2014	Best Public High School in Wisconsin	Niche	1
2014	Best High School in Wisconsin	U.S. News & World Report	1
2021	Best High School in Dane County	U.S. News & World Report	1
2021	Best High School in Wisconsin	U.S. News & World Report	11
2021	Best High Schools for Athletes in Dane County	Niche	1
2021	Best Schools for STEM in Wisconsin	Niche	2
2021	Best Public High Schools in the Madison Area	Niche	1
2021	Best High Schools for Athletes in America	Niche	98
2024	Best High Schools for STEM in Wisconsin	Niche	2
2024	Best College Prep Public High Schools in Wisconsin	Niche	3
2024	Best Public High Schools in Wisconsin	Niche	5
2024	Best Public High Schools in the Madison Area	Niche	1

== Notable alumni ==
- Casey Cramer, Professional Football Player
- Jill Karofsky, Wisconsin State Supreme Court Justice
- Jon Erpenbach, Wisconsin State Senator
- Nick Toon, Professional Football Player
- Ryan Groy, Professional Football Player
- Josh Lambo, Professional Soccer & Football Player
- Alan Roden, Professional Baseball Player
