= Pauline Kruger Hamilton =

American photographer (1870–1918)

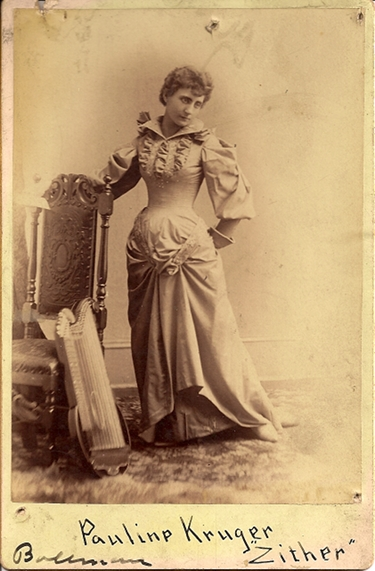
- Pauline Kruger Hamilton in 1893
- Born: 1870; Middleton, Wisconsin, U.S.
- Died: July 8, 1918; New York City, New York, U.S.
- Occupation: Photographer

Pauline Kruger Hamilton (1870 – July 8, 1918) was an American photographer who served as royal court photographer in Vienna, Austria.

== Biography ==
Her first husband, Frank Hamilton, killed a man in a quarrel and died of tuberculosis soon after being released from prison. After his death, she inherited a generous sum of money and moved to Vienna bringing a camera she received from a Minneapolis artist, Louis Sweet. Hamilton would go on to study painting, but was noticed for her photography and became friends with Archduke Friedrich. For five years, thanks to the patronage of Franz Joseph I, she served as the official royal court photographer. She was a friend of feminist activist May Wright Sewall and corresponded with her from Germany.

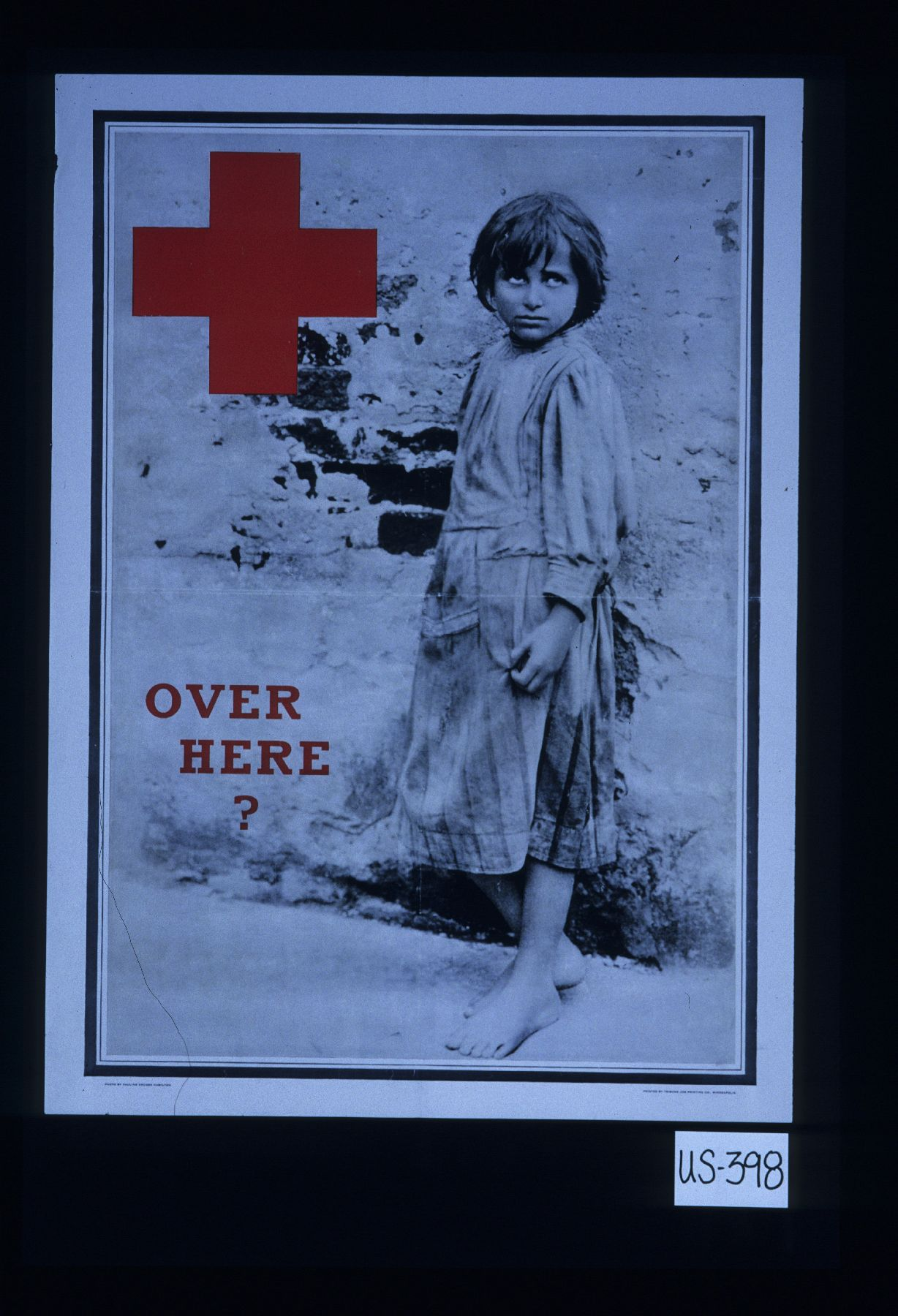

She returned to the United States in 1915 to advocate for support for the widows and orphans of World War I. Her photo of a child in Austria was used for the 1919 American Red Cross annual campaign and membership drive.

Later in her life she was suspected of being a spy, followed by federal agents, and died before charges could be proved. Suspicious that she might be attempting to fake her own death, the Department of Justice sent officials to her funeral who verified that hers was the body in the coffin.

== Photography ==
Pauline first created her portraits by hand painting, but as a new tool in her approach, she soon began to incorporate photography. Pauline describes photography as “The harmony of composition and naturalness of pose provided by my lens allow for a superior initial drawing of my subject. As I proceed with my brush, the detailed features and character of the sitter are infused in the painting.” Pauline was at the forefront of a trend where the romanticism of painting and the reality of photography started to profoundly influence one another. Events in her personal life at the time were strongly related to her ultimate decision to utilize the camera as her exclusive artistic tool.
