= Casey Cramer =

American football player (born 1982)

No. 49, 48, 30
- Positions: Fullback, tight end

Personal information
- Born: January 5, 1982 (age 44); Madison, Wisconsin, U.S.
- Listed height: 6 ft 2 in (1.88 m)
- Listed weight: 250 lb (113 kg)

Career information
- High school: Middleton (Middleton, Wisconsin)
- College: Dartmouth
- NFL draft: 2004: 7th round, 228th overall pick

Career history
- Tampa Bay Buccaneers (2004)*; New York Jets (2004)*; Tennessee Titans (2004)*; Carolina Panthers (2004–2005); Tennessee Titans (2006–2007); Miami Dolphins (2008); Tennessee Titans (2008)
- * Offseason or practice squad member only

Career NFL statistics
- Receptions: 4
- Receiving yards: 11
- Receiving touchdowns: 1
- Stats at Pro Football Reference

Casey Ross Cramer (born January 5, 1982) is an American former professional football player who was a fullback in the National Football League (NFL). He was selected by the Tampa Bay Buccaneers in the seventh round of the 2004 NFL draft. He played college football for the Dartmouth Big Green.

Cramer was also a member of the New York Jets, Tennessee Titans, Carolina Panthers and Miami Dolphins.

== Early life ==
He went to high school at Middleton High School in Middleton, Wisconsin, where he is the son of an English teacher and school psychologist. He lettered in football, basketball and track for the Cardinals, and was one of the captains for varsity football team. He was the starting tight end and middle linebacker, and was the team's punter.

== College career ==
Cramer played college football at Dartmouth College, where he majored in psychology, graduating in 2004. He was a brother at Gamma Delta Chi fraternity and participated in various community service organizations. He primarily played tight end and special teams at Dartmouth. Cramer ranks second in Dartmouth history with 185 catches for 2,477 yards and 21 touchdowns as a tight end. Cramer appeared in 39 games with 33 starts and led all college tight ends with 72 receptions for 1,017 yards and seven touchdowns as junior in 2002. He also posted 11 career games with 100 yards or more of receiving. He is Dartmouth's most recent All-American, making three different All-America first-teams in 2002 and also the Associated Press second-team that fall.

== Professional career ==
Cramer was selected in the seventh round (228 overall) of the 2004 NFL draft by the Tampa Bay Buccaneers. Casey was later cut on August 31, 2004.

Cramer signed with the New York Jets on September 1, 2004. He was waived on September 4, 2004.

Cramer was signed to the practice squad of the Tennessee Titans on September 7, 2004. He was released on November 17, 2004.

Cramer signed with the Carolina Panthers on November 17, 2004. He became a free agent after the 2004 season. He was later re-signed by the Panthers on June 14. Cramer was waived on September 3, signed to the team's practice squad on September 5, and promoted to the active roster on December 16, 2005. He became a free agent again after the 2005 season. He re-signed with the Panthers on April 25, 2006. Cramer was waived on September 2, 2006.

Cramer was signed by the Titans on September 3, 2006. In the 2006 season, he saw his most playing time in the NFL, even blocking a punt and recovering a fumble against the Washington Redskins. Besides making the highlight reels, Peter King's Monday Morning Quarterback, and Chris Berman's plays of the week, Cramer also earned NFL special teams player of the week for his performance. On August 30, 2008, Cramer was released from the Titans during final cuts.

Following Week 1 of the 2008 regular season, the Miami Dolphins released starting fullback Boomer Grigsby. Cramer was signed to replace him on the roster on September 9. In nine games with the Dolphins including two starts, Cramer caught two passes for three yards and a touchdown. The Dolphins waived Cramer on December 20 when they promoted linebacker William Kershaw from the practice squad.

Cramer was re-signed by the Titans on December 31, 2008, after linebacker Josh Stamer was placed on injured reserve. He was waived on September 4, 2009.

== Post-football career ==
Cramer is pastor of King's Cross Community Church, a Presbyterian Church in America (PCA) church in Dayton, Ohio. He previously served on the staff of several PCA churches in Nashville, Tennessee.
