= Russell Bodine =

American football player (born 1992)

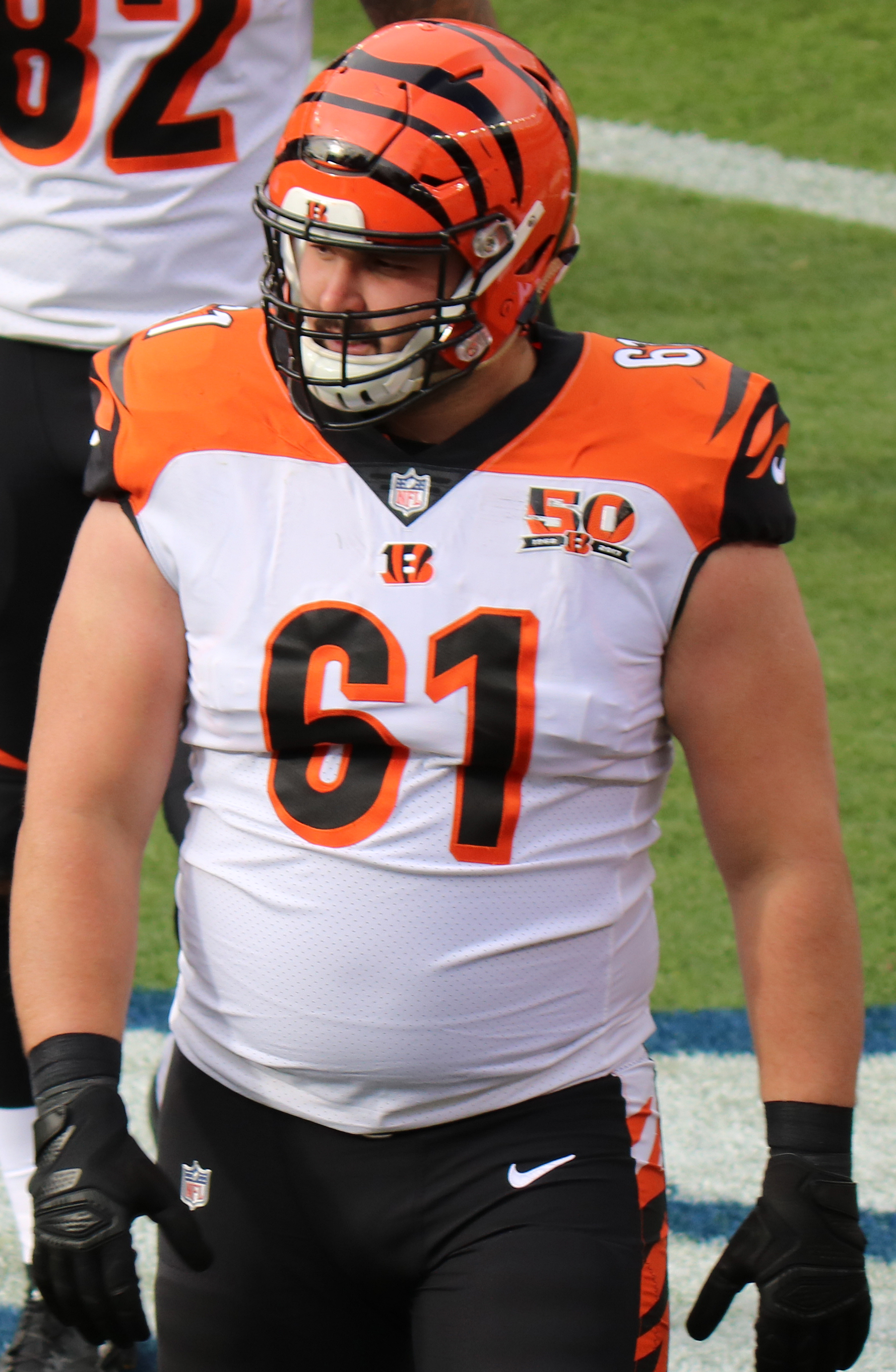
- Bodine with the Cincinnati Bengals in 2017

No. 61, 66, 60
- Position: Center

Personal information
- Born: June 30, 1992 (age 34); Scottsville, Virginia, U.S.
- Listed height: 6 ft 3 in (1.91 m)
- Listed weight: 308 lb (140 kg)

Career information
- High school: Fork Union Military Academy (Fork Union, Virginia)
- College: North Carolina
- NFL draft: 2014: 4th round, 111th overall pick

Career history
- Cincinnati Bengals (2014–2017); Buffalo Bills (2018); New England Patriots (2019)*; Detroit Lions (2020)
- * Offseason or practice squad member only

Career NFL statistics
- Games played: 74
- Games started: 74
- Stats at Pro Football Reference

Russell Bodine (born June 30, 1992) is an American former professional football player who was a center in the National Football League (NFL). He played college football for the North Carolina Tar Heels, and was selected by the Cincinnati Bengals in the fourth round of the 2014 NFL draft.

== Early life ==
A native of Scottsville, Virginia, Bodine attended Fork Union Military Academy, where he was named first-team all-state at the highest of three private school divisions for two straight seasons. He was teammates with Morgan Moses, Austin Pasztor, Terrance West, and Carlos Hyde.

Regarded as a three-star recruit by Rivals.com, Bodine was listed as the No. 8 center prospect in his class.

== College career ==
As a sophomore, Bodine started all 12 games at center, having eventual NFL players Travis Bond and Jonathan Cooper lined up on each side of him.

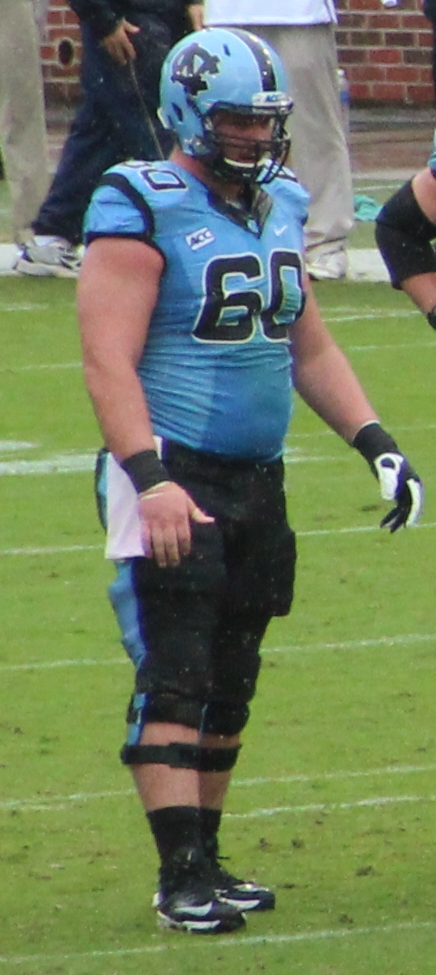
Bodine with the North Carolina Tar Heels in 2013

As a junior, he primarily played center again, but also was moved along the offensive line. On December 30, 2013, he announced his decision to forgo his final year of eligibility and enter the 2014 NFL draft.

== Professional career ==
=== Pre-draft ===
Bodine registered 42 repetitions in the 225-pound (102 kg) bench press, for best in his class.

Pre-draft measurables
| Height | Weight | Arm length | Hand span | 40-yard dash | 10-yard split | 20-yard split | 20-yard shuttle | Three-cone drill | Vertical jump | Broad jump | Bench press |
|---|---|---|---|---|---|---|---|---|---|---|---|
| 6 ft 3 1/8 in (1.91 m) | 310 lb (141 kg) | 32 1/2 in (0.83 m) | 10 in (0.25 m) | 5.18 s | 1.85 s | 3.03 s | 4.66 s | 8.26 s | 29 in (0.74 m) | 9 ft 1 in (2.77 m) | 42 reps |
All values from NFL Combine

=== Cincinnati Bengals ===
The Cincinnati Bengals selected Bodine in the fourth round (111th overall) of the 2014 NFL draft. He was the fifth center and 13th interior offensive linemen selected in 2014. On May 23, 2014, the Bengals signed Bodine to a four-year, $2.67 million contract that includes a signing bonus of $456,456.

Throughout training camp, Bodine competed against Trevor Robinson for the job as the starting center after it was left vacant following the departure of Kyle Cook. He received first-team reps at center from the beginning of training camp and was officially named the starter by head coach Marvin Lewis to start the regular season. He made his first career start in the Bengals' season-opening 23–16 victory over the Baltimore Ravens. He started all 16 regular season games as Cincinnati went 10–5–1 and made the playoffs.

In each of his first four years as a Bengal, Bodine started all 16 games at center.

=== Buffalo Bills ===
On March 19, 2018, Bodine signed a two-year contract with the Buffalo Bills. He was named the backup center to start the 2018 season behind Ryan Groy, and took over the starting role in Week 3 following struggles from Groy. Bodine started the next 10 games before suffering a broken fibula in Week 13. He was placed on injured reserve on December 4.

=== New England Patriots ===
On August 30, 2019, Bodine was traded to the New England Patriots for a sixth-round pick. He was released on September 6.

=== Detroit Lions ===
On December 31, 2019, Bodine signed a reserve/future contract with the Detroit Lions. On August 5, 2020, he announced he would opt out of the 2020 season due to the COVID-19 pandemic. He was released after the season on March 8, 2021.
