= Matthew Wells (linebacker) =

American football player (born 1990)

No. 51, 44
- Position: Linebacker

Personal information
- Born: November 26, 1990 (age 35); Monticello, Mississippi, U.S.
- Listed height: 6 ft 2 in (1.88 m)
- Listed weight: 222 lb (101 kg)

Career information
- High school: Monticello (MS) Lawrence Co.
- College: Mississippi State
- NFL draft: 2015: 6th round, 178th overall pick

Career history
- New England Patriots (2015)*; Chicago Bears (2015)*; St. Louis Rams (2015–2016)*; Atlanta Falcons (2016)*; Hamilton Tiger-Cats (2016); Birmingham Iron (2019)
- * Offseason or practice squad member only
- Stats at Pro Football Reference

Matthew Sean Wells (born November 26, 1990) is an American former professional football linebacker. He was selected by the New England Patriots with the 178th pick of the 2015 NFL draft.

He played college football at Mississippi State, where he started 33 games.

== Professional career ==
=== New England Patriots ===
Wells was selected in the sixth round of the 2015 NFL draft by the New England Patriots.

=== Chicago Bears ===
On August 10, 2015, the Patriots traded Wells to the Chicago Bears for Ryan Groy. On September 5, 2015, he was released by the Bears.

=== St. Louis / Los Angeles Rams ===
On November 10, 2015, the St. Louis Rams signed Wells to their practice squad. On December 1, 2015, he was released from practice squad.

On June 24, 2016, Wells was released by the Rams.

=== Atlanta Falcons ===
Wells was signed by the Atlanta Falcons. On September 3, 2016, he was waived by the Falcons due to final roster cuts.

=== Hamilton Tiger-Cats ===
Wells signed with the Hamilton Tiger-Cats of the Canadian Football League on October 10, 2016.

=== Birmingham Iron ===
In 2018, Wells signed with the Birmingham Iron of the Alliance of American Football for the 2019 season. He was waived on April 1, 2019.
