= Boomer Grigsby =

American football player (born 1981)

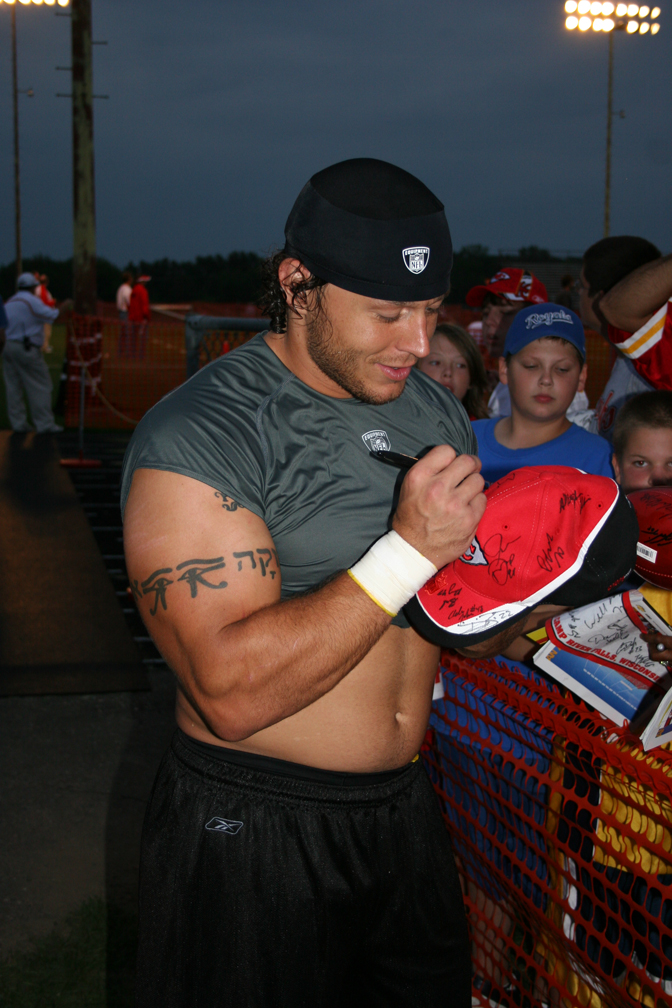
- Grigsby in 2006

No. 51, 46
- Positions: Linebacker, fullback

Personal information
- Born: November 15, 1981 (age 44); Canton, Illinois, U.S.
- Listed height: 5 ft 11 in (1.80 m)
- Listed weight: 237 lb (108 kg)

Career information
- High school: Canton
- College: Illinois State
- NFL draft: 2005: 5th round, 138th overall pick

Career history
- Kansas City Chiefs (2005–2007); Miami Dolphins (2008); Houston Texans (2009)*
- * Offseason or practice squad member only

Awards and highlights
- 3× Division I-AA All-American (2002–2004); 3× Gateway Player of the Year (2002–2004); 3× All-Gateway (2002–2004)

Career NFL statistics
- Total tackles: 36
- Receptions: 2
- Receiving yards: 14
- Stats at Pro Football Reference
- College Football Hall of Fame

James Harvey "Boomer" Grigsby (born November 15, 1981) is an American former professional football player who was a fullback in the National Football League (NFL). He played college football for the Illinois State Redbirds, and was selected by the Kansas City Chiefs in the fifth round of the 2005 NFL draft. Grigsby was also a member of the Miami Dolphins and Houston Texans.

== Early life ==
Grigsby attended and played high school football at Canton High School where he was an all-area linebacker during his senior season. He was not recruited to play college football until an Illinois State coach saw him lifting weights in his high school's weight room.

== College career ==
Grigsby was a four-year letterman at Illinois State University. As a sophomore, he set a school record with 179 tackles and also recorded what would remain a career-high four sacks.

The following season, Grigsby tied his own school record with 179 tackles. He came in second behind only future Kansas City Chiefs teammate Jared Allen in the voting for the Buck Buchanan Award, given annually to the top defensive player in Division I-AA.

In 44 games (40 starts), at Illinois State, Grigsby recorded a school record 580 tackles to go along with 41.5 tackles for a loss, 13 sacks, six fumble recoveries, five forced fumbles and seven passes defended. He was Gateway Football Conference Player of the Year, a Division I-AA All-American and Buchanan award finalist each of his final three seasons.

== Professional career ==
=== Kansas City Chiefs ===
Grigsby was selected by the Kansas City Chiefs in the fifth round (138th overall) of the 2005 NFL draft. On July 15, he signed a three-year, $1.067 million contract with the team. It included a signing bonus of $142,000 and base salaries of $230,000 (2005), $310,000 (2006) and $385,000 (2007).

Grigsby played in all 16 regular season games that year in a reserve role and finished third on the team with 19 special teams tackles.

"Boomer Grigsby has as much presence at the position as anybody I've been around at the start of his career."

— Gunther Cunningham,
Chiefs defensive coordinator

Appearing in 15 games in 2006, Grigsby again ranked third on the Chiefs in special teams tackles with 18. He missed one game that season with foot injury.

Prior to the 2007 regular season, Grigsby was converted from linebacker to fullback. The transition was chronicled on the HBO reality series Hard Knocks:Training Camp with the Kansas City Chiefs.

Despite the position change and an injury to his ribs during the preseason, Grigsby made the team. He went on to appear in 13 games for the Chiefs that season including one start. His first NFL reception came on a nine-yard pass from quarterback Brodie Croyle against the Denver Broncos on December 9, and he finished the season with two receptions for 14 yards. He finished third on the team in special teams tackles (12) for the third straight season.

A restricted free agent in the 2008 offseason, Grigsby was not tendered a contract by the Chiefs and became an unrestricted free agent.

=== Miami Dolphins ===
On March 4, 2008, Grigsby agreed to terms on a one-year contract with the Miami Dolphins. The signing reunited him with current Dolphins running backs coach James Saxon, who was Grigsby's position coach with the Chiefs in 2007.

Grigsby won the team's starting fullback job in 2008 after incumbent Reagan Mauia was released during final cuts. However, after starting the Dolphins' season opener against the New York Jets on September 7, Grigsby was released by the team two days later in favor of free agent Casey Cramer. He spent the rest of the season out of football.

=== Houston Texans ===
Grigsby was signed by the Houston Texans on May 12, 2009. He was waived with an injury designation on August 18. After going unclaimed on waivers, he reverted to Texans' injured reserve. He was released with an injury settlement on August 25.
