= Middleton-Cross Plains School District =

School district in Middleton, Wisconsin, United States

Address
- 7106 South Avenue Middleton, Wisconsin, 53562; United States

District information
- Grades: PK–12
- Superintendent: Dr. Dana Monogue
- Schools: 12
- NCES District ID: 5509510

Students and staff
- Enrollment: 7,167 (2024–25)
- Faculty: 546.54 (on an FTE basis)
- Student–teacher ratio: 13.11

Other information
- Website: www.mcpasd.k12.wi.us

The Middleton-Cross Plains School District is a public school district in Dane County, Wisconsin, United States, based in Middleton, Wisconsin.

== Schools ==
The Middleton-Cross Plains School District has seven elementary schools, two middle schools, one high school and one alternative senior high school.

=== Elementary schools ===
- Elm Lawn Elementary School
- Park Elementary School
- Pope Farm Elementary School
- Northside Elementary School
- Sauk Trail Elementary School
- Sunset Ridge Elementary School
- West Middleton Elementary School

=== Middle schools ===
- Glacier Creek Middle School
- Kromrey Middle School

=== High schools ===
- Clark Street Community School
- Middleton High School
