= Middleton, Wisconsin =

- City
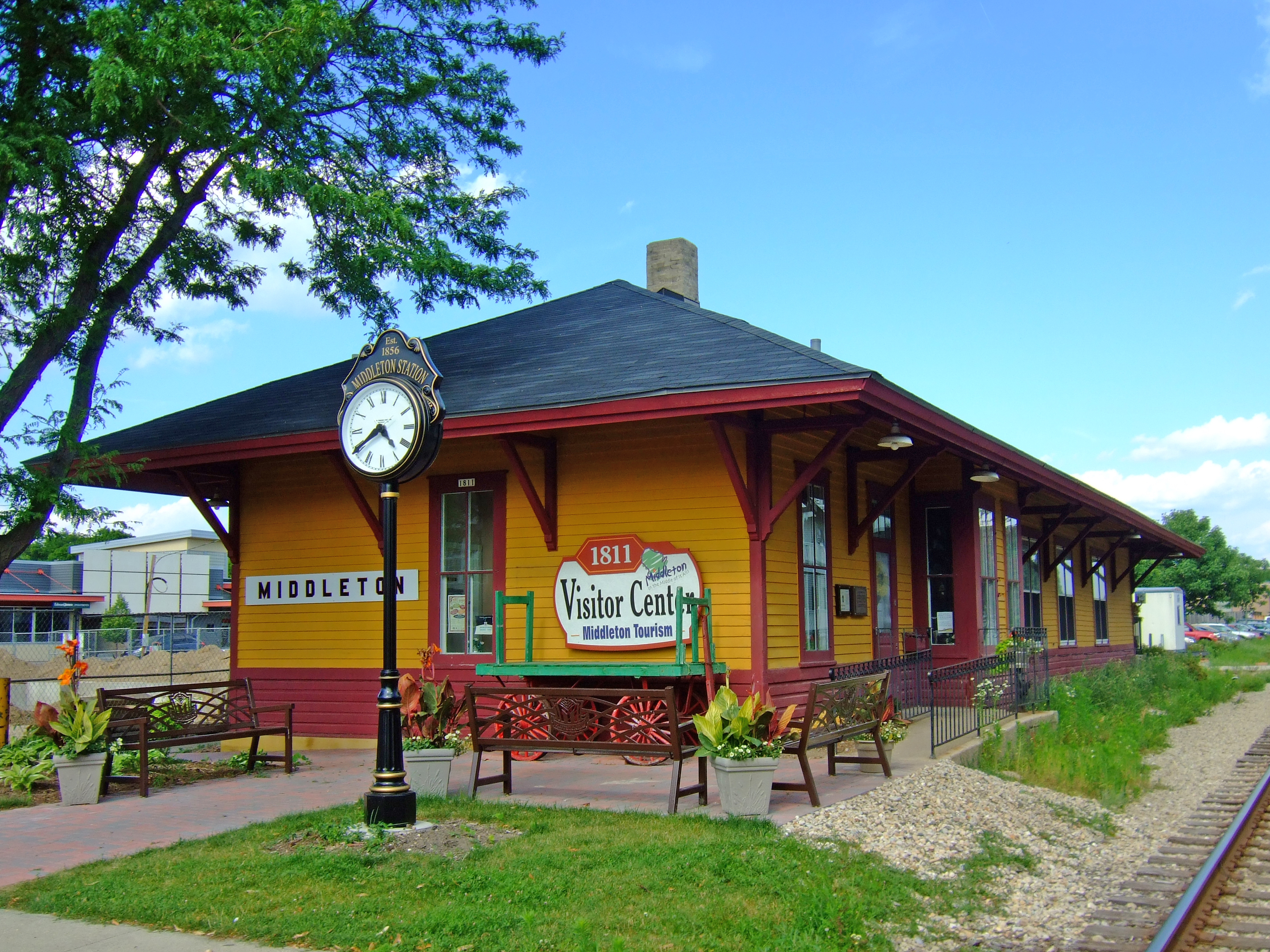
- Middleton depot
- Motto: "The Good Neighbor City"
- Interactive map of Middleton, Wisconsin
- Location within Wisconsin Location within the United States
- Coordinates: 43°03′37″N 89°34′18″W
- Country: United States
- State: Wisconsin
- County: Dane

Government
  - Type: City Council/Mayor
  - Mayor: Lisa Janairo

Area
  - City: 9.07 sq mi (23.49 km^{2})
  - Land: 8.93 sq mi (23.14 km^{2})
  - Water: 0.14 sq mi (0.35 km^{2})

Population (2020)
  - City: 21,827
  - Estimate (2025): 23,115
  - Density: 2,242.2/sq mi (865.73/km^{2})
  - Metro: 561,505 (88th)
- Time zone: UTC−6 (Central (CST))
  - Summer (DST): UTC−5 (CDT)
- ZIP codes: 53562
- Area code: 608/353
- FIPS code: 55-51575
- Website: cityofmiddleton.us

Middleton is a city in Dane County, Wisconsin, United States. The population was 21,827 at the 2020 census. A suburb northwest of Madison, it is part of the Madison metropolitan area. Middleton's motto is "The Good Neighbor City."

== History ==
The first settlers were mostly of English descent, and they came to Middleton in the 1840s. It was called Peatville for the large quantities of peat extracted from its soil. The town was renamed Middleton when it was separated from the town of Madison in 1848. Many German settlers arrived to Middleton in the 1850s, and after the year 1880, the population was largely of German descent. The first Lutheran Church was founded in the area in 1852.

Middleton incorporated as a village in 1905 and it became a city in 1963. At the suggestion of its first postmaster, Harry Barnes, it was named after a community in Vermont.

== Geography ==
Middleton is located in Dane County in south-central Wisconsin, approximately 6 miles (10 km) west-northwest of downtown Madison, the state capital.

According to the United States Census Bureau, the city has a total area of 9.12 square miles (23.62 km²), of which 8.98 square miles (23.26 km²) is land and 0.14 square miles (0.36 km²) is water.

Middleton is situated along the western shore of Lake Mendota and includes portions of the Pheasant Branch watershed, which drains into the lake.

=== Climate ===
Climate data for Middleton, Wisconsin
Month	Jan	Feb	Mar	Apr	May	Jun	Jul	Aug	Sep	Oct	Nov	Dec	Year
Mean daily maximum °F (°C)	23 (−5)	29 (−2)	41 (5)	54 (12)	67 (19)	77 (25)	81 (27)	78 (26)	70 (21)	58 (14)	42 (6)	29 (−2)	54 (12)
Mean daily minimum °F (°C)	6 (−14)	12 (−11)	23 (−5)	35 (2)	46 (8)	56 (13)	60 (16)	58 (14)	50 (10)	38 (3)	25 (−4)	13 (−11)	35 (2)
Average precipitation inches (mm)	1.14 (29)	1.14 (29)	2.18 (55)	3.61 (92)	3.47 (88)	4.50 (114)	4.03 (102)	4.05 (103)	3.25 (83)	2.42 (61)	2.37 (60)	1.32 (34)	33.48 (850)
Source: The Weather Channel

Severe flooding occurred in August 2018, including along Pheasant Branch Creek.

== Demographics ==
Historical population
Census	Pop.	Note	%±
1870	285		—
1880	295		3.5%
1910	679		—
1920	791		16.5%
1930	983		24.3%
1940	1,358		38.1%
1950	2,110		55.4%
1960	4,410		109.0%
1970	8,246		87.0%
1980	11,851		43.7%
1990	13,289		12.1%
2000	15,770		18.7%
2010	17,442		10.6%
2020	21,827		25.1%
2025 (est.)	23,115		5.9%
U.S. Decennial Census

=== 2020 census ===
As of the 2020 census, Middleton had a population of 21,827. The median age was 39.5 years. 21.0% of residents were under the age of 18, 34.76% were between the ages of 20 and 44, 24.2% were from 45 to 64, and 18.3% were 65 years of age or older. The sex breakdown was 48.0% male and 52.0% female. For every 100 females there were 92.2 males, and for every 100 females age 18 and over there were 89.6 males age 18 and over.

99.2% of residents lived in urban areas, while 0.8% lived in rural areas.

There were 10,104 households in Middleton, of which 26.0% had children under the age of 18 living in them. Of all households, 41.5% were married-couple households, 7.7% were cohabiting-couple households, 20.8% were households with a male householder and no spouse or partner present, and 30.0% were households with a female householder and no spouse or partner present. About 37.8% of all households were made up of individuals, 27.1% had one or more people aged 65 or older, and 12.3% had someone living alone who was 65 years of age or older.

There were 10,509 housing units, of which 3.9% were vacant. The homeowner vacancy rate was 0.6% and the rental vacancy rate was 3.1%.

Racial composition as of the 2020 census
Race	Number	Percent
White	17,280	79.2%
Black or African American	792	3.6%
American Indian and Alaska Native	93	0.4%
Asian	1,522	7.0%
Native Hawaiian and Other Pacific Islander	6	0.0%
Some other race	571	2.6%
Two or more races	1,563	7.2%
Hispanic or Latino (of any race)	1,488	6.8%

=== 2010 census ===
As of the census of 2010, there were 17,442 people, 8,037 households, and 4,453 families residing in the city. The population density was 1,942.3 inhabitants per square mile (749.9/km^{2}). There were 8,565 housing units at an average density of 953.8 per square mile (368.3/km^{2}). The racial makeup of the city was 87.1% White, 3.5% African American, 0.3% Native American, 4.2% Asian, 2.3% from other races, and 2.5% from two or more races. Hispanic or Latino of any race were 5.6% of the population.

There were 8,037 households, of which 26.7% had children under the age of 18 living with them, 43.6% were married couples living together, 8.7% had a female householder with no husband present, 3.0% had a male householder with no wife present, and 44.6% were non-families. 36.0% of all households were made up of individuals, and 9.4% had someone living alone who was 65 years of age or older. The average household size was 2.16 and the average family size was 2.86.

The median age in the city was 39.1 years. 21.8% of residents were under the age of 18; 7.5% were between the ages of 18 and 24; 29.1% were from 25 to 44; 29.3% were from 45 to 64; and 12.3% were 65 years of age or older. The gender makeup of the city was 48.3% male and 51.7% female.

=== 2000 census ===
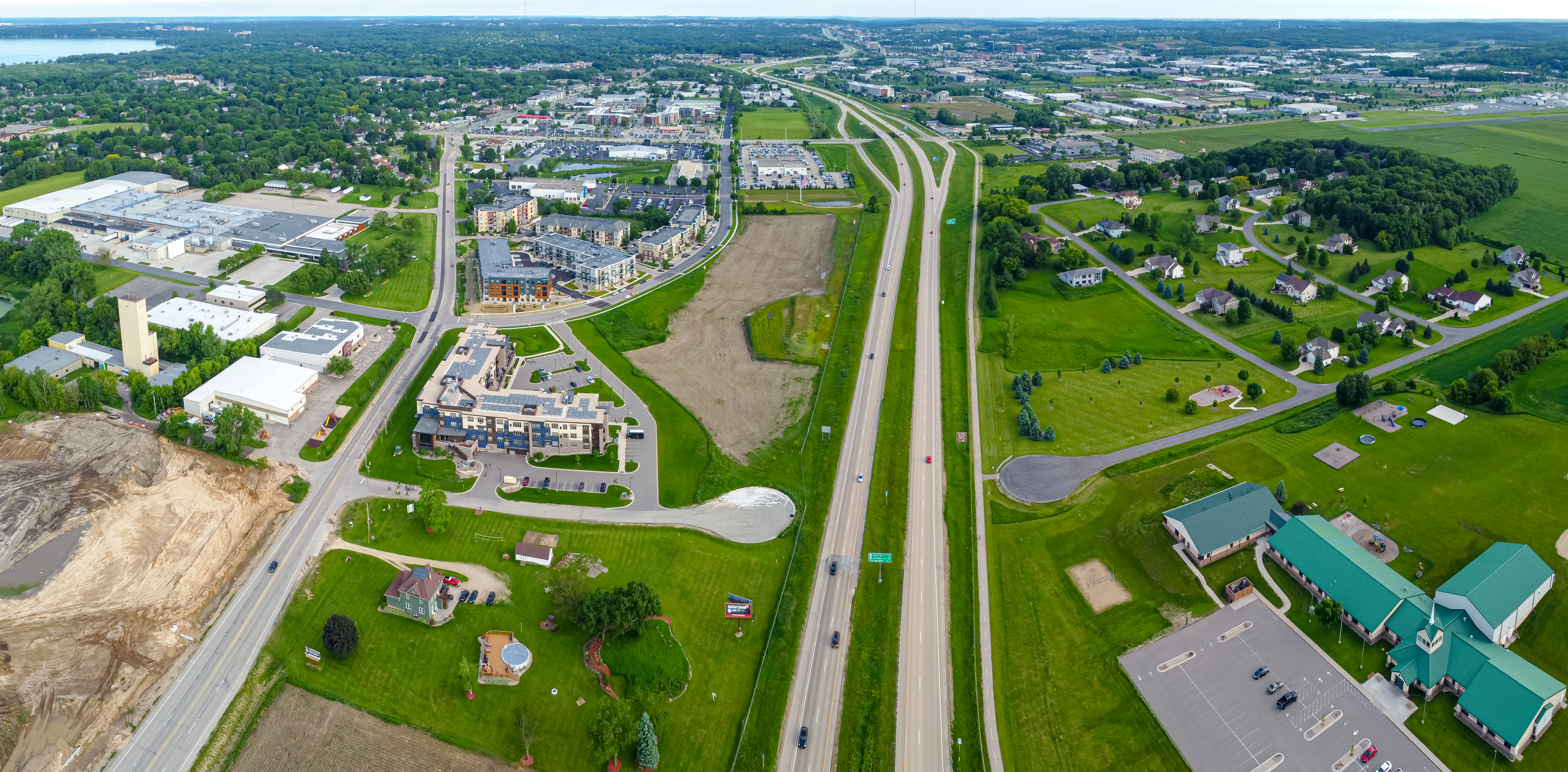
Middleton

As of the census in 2000, there were 15,770 people living in Middleton. The population density was 1,953.2 people per square mile (754.5/km^{2}). There were 7,397 housing units at an average density of 916.2 per square mile (353.9/km^{2}). The racial makeup of the city was 92.08% White, 1.97% Black or African American, 0.45% Native American, 2.66% Asian, 0.03% Pacific Islander, 1.27% from other races, and 1.54% from two or more races. 2.82% of the population were Hispanic or Latino of any race.

According to the census, there were 7,095 households in Middleton, out of which 27.9% had children under the age of 18 living with them, 45.5% were married couples living together, 8.1% had a female householder with no husband present, and 43.9% were non-families. 34.5% of all households were made up of individuals, and 7.2% had someone living alone who was 65 years of age or older. The average household size was 2.21 and the average family size was 2.90.

The age of the population of Middleton is fairly diverse. The census states that 22.7% of the citizens there were under the age of 18, 8.7% from 18 to 24, 33.1% from 25 to 44, 25.2% from 45 to 64, and 10.3% who were 65 years of age or older. The median age was 36 years. For every 100 females, there were 92.1 males. For every 100 females age 18 and over, there were 88.6 males.

The median income for a household in the city was $50,786, and the median income for a family was $71,514. Males had a median income of $41,070 versus $30,928 for females. The per capita income for the city was $29,464. About 3.1% of families and 5.0% of the population were below the poverty line, including 7.2% of those under age 18 and 2.8% of those age 65 or over.

== Economy ==
Middleton has a diversified economy that includes manufacturing, life sciences, corporate services, health care, retail, and hospitality. As part of the Madison metropolitan area, the city benefits from its proximity to the University of Wisconsin–Madison and the region's concentration of research- and technology-related employment.

Companies with major operations in Middleton include Electronic Theatre Controls (ETC), a manufacturer of lighting and rigging technology headquartered in the city; Spectrum Brands, whose principal executive offices are in Middleton; and Springs Window Fashions, which maintains its corporate office and plant in Middleton.

Life sciences and laboratory services are a significant part of the local economy. Thermo Fisher Scientific operates a clinical research and laboratory services campus in Middleton through its PPD business, and in 2024 announced an expansion of its Middleton laboratory operations.

Retail and hospitality activity is concentrated in downtown Middleton and the Greenway Station district, an open-air shopping area on the city's west side.

=== Business ===
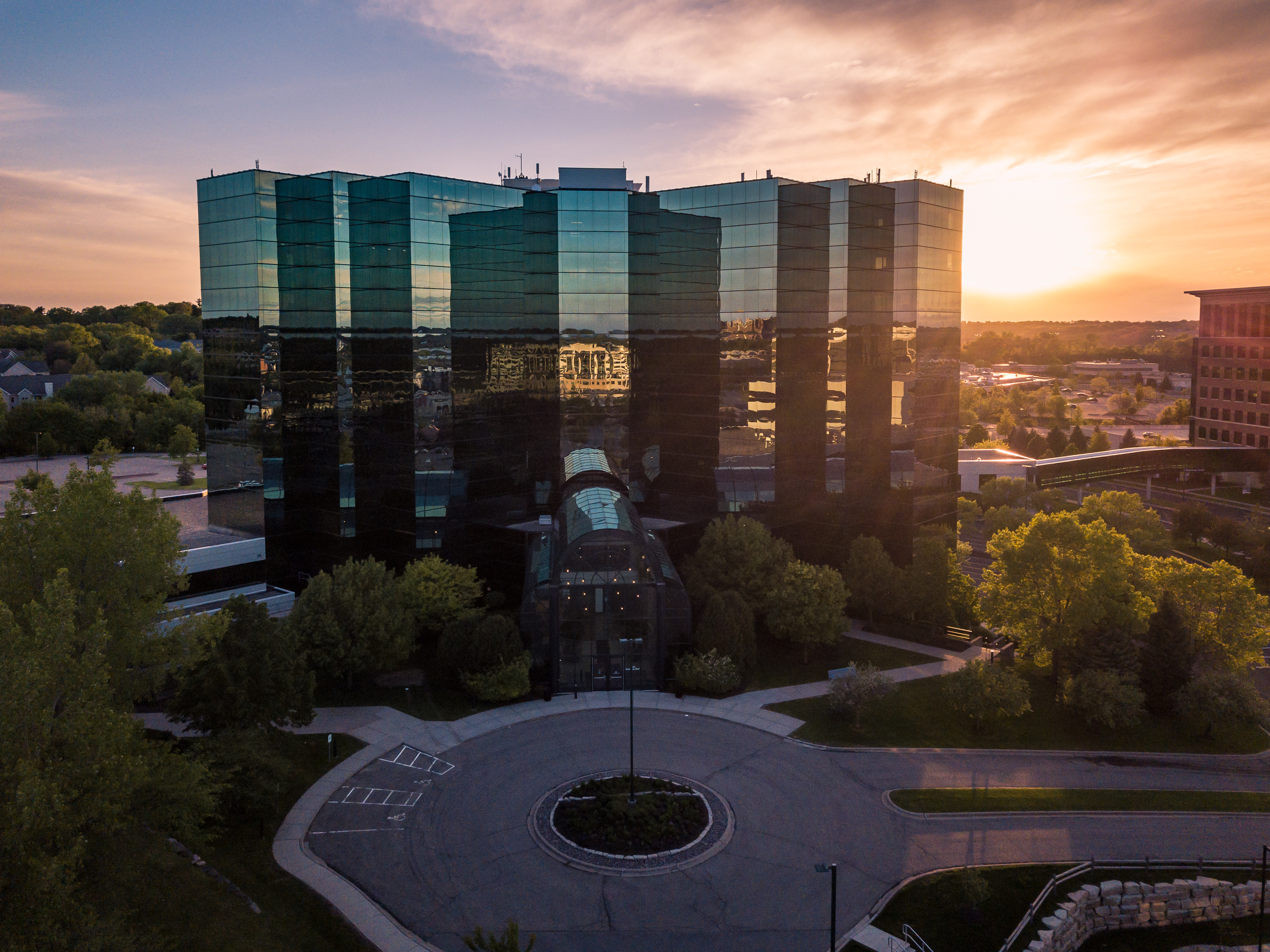
Wisconsin Trade Center

Middleton is home to more than 2,000 businesses and has a strong concentration of manufacturing, life sciences, and technology companies within the Madison metropolitan region.

=== Top employers ===
Major employers in Middleton include the following organizations:

Employer	Industry
Thermo Fisher Scientific (PPD clinical research division)	Pharmaceutical research and laboratory services
Electronic Theatre Controls	Entertainment and architectural lighting technology manufacturing
UW Health / UW Medical Foundation	Health care and medical services
Middleton-Cross Plains Area School District	Public education
Spectrum Brands	Consumer products and home goods manufacturing
Springs Window Fashions	Window coverings manufacturing and corporate services
North Central Group	Hospitality management and hotel development
Humana	Health insurance and health services
Hy Cite Enterprises	Direct sales and cookware products
Fiskars	Consumer goods and housewares manufacturing

=== Tourism and shopping ===
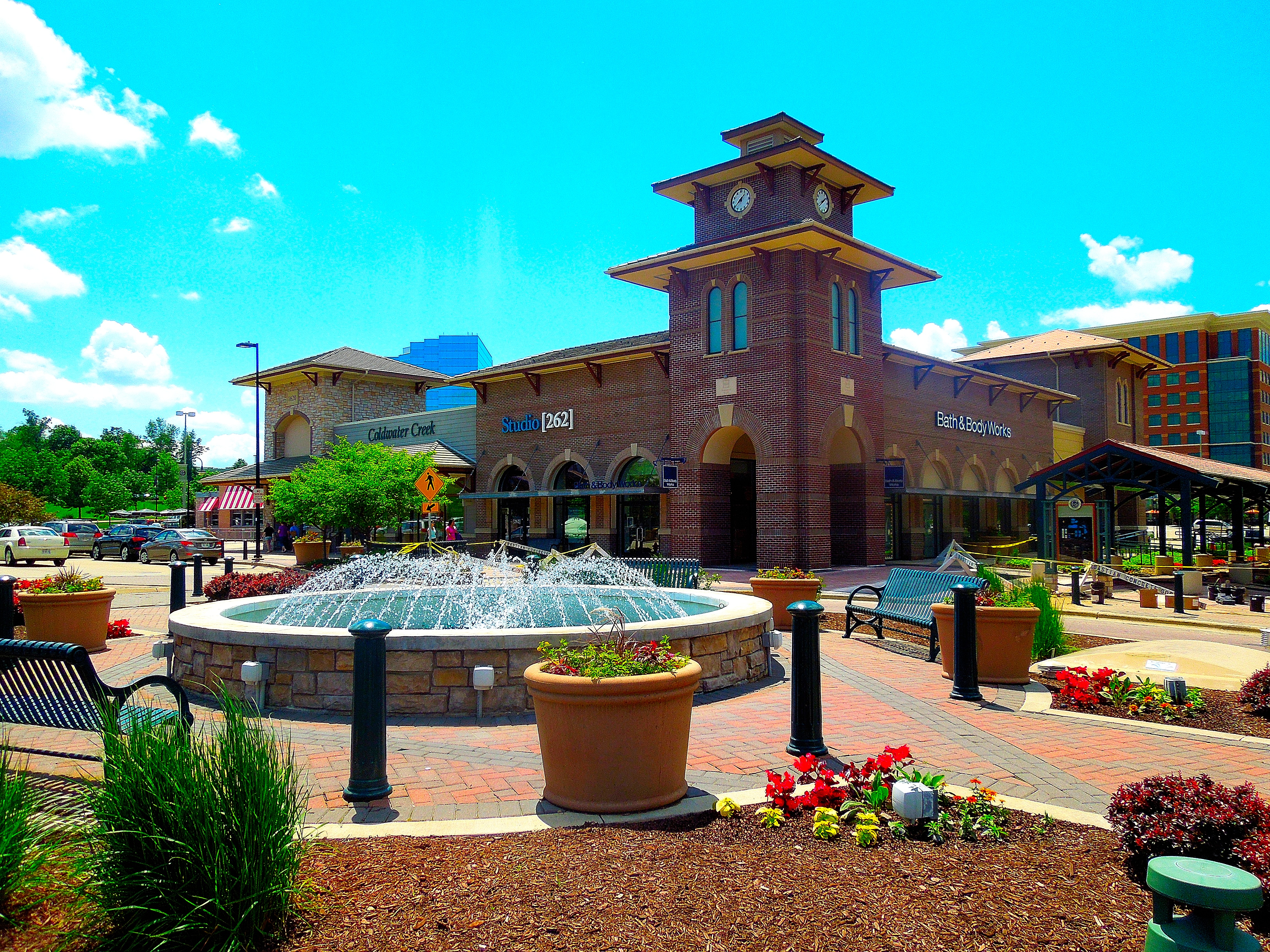
Greenway Station shopping center

Greenway Station is a shopping mall opened in 2003. Downtown Middleton has several shops and restaurants.

== Arts and culture ==
=== Attractions ===
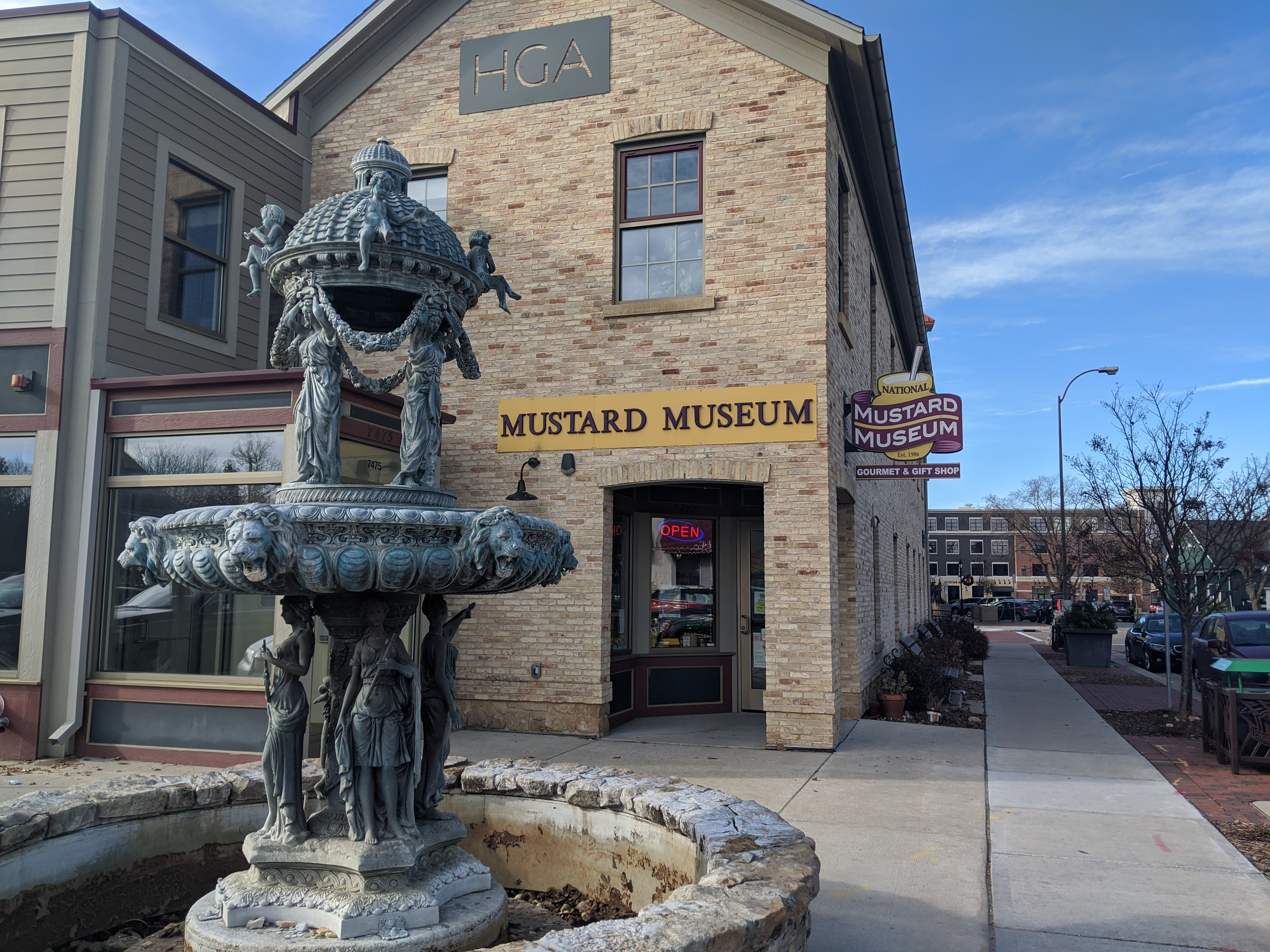
National Mustard Museum

Middleton is the home of the National Mustard Museum. It is often featured in lists of unusual museums in the United States. It was originally located in the nearby town of Mount Horeb, Wisconsin, but moved to Middleton. The museum and its curator were featured on National Public Radio's Morning Edition broadcast of July 29, 2010, and Weekend Edition Saturday on February 18, 1995 (when it was located in Mount Horeb). Middleton's second museum, Middleton Historical Museum (also known as Rowley House) offers information and donations by early settlers. Middleton Train Depot was built in 1856. It was an active passenger station until 1960 and a freight depot until 1975. It is listed on the National Register of Historic Places and serves as a visitor center.

Wisconsin Trade Center is a commercial office building made of blue glass windows and it is the tallest building in Middleton. Middleton has a garden and landscaping center called Orchids Garden Centre & Nursery.

Capital Brewery was founded in 1984 to brew German-style lager beer and has since branched to American-style ales and barrel-aged beers. Capital Brewery has won over 240 awards. The Capital Brewery Bier Garten is open from April to October and it often offers live music and food vendors. Hidden Cave Cidery, opened in 2021, is a local cidery that makes cider of Wisconsin apples.

=== Events ===
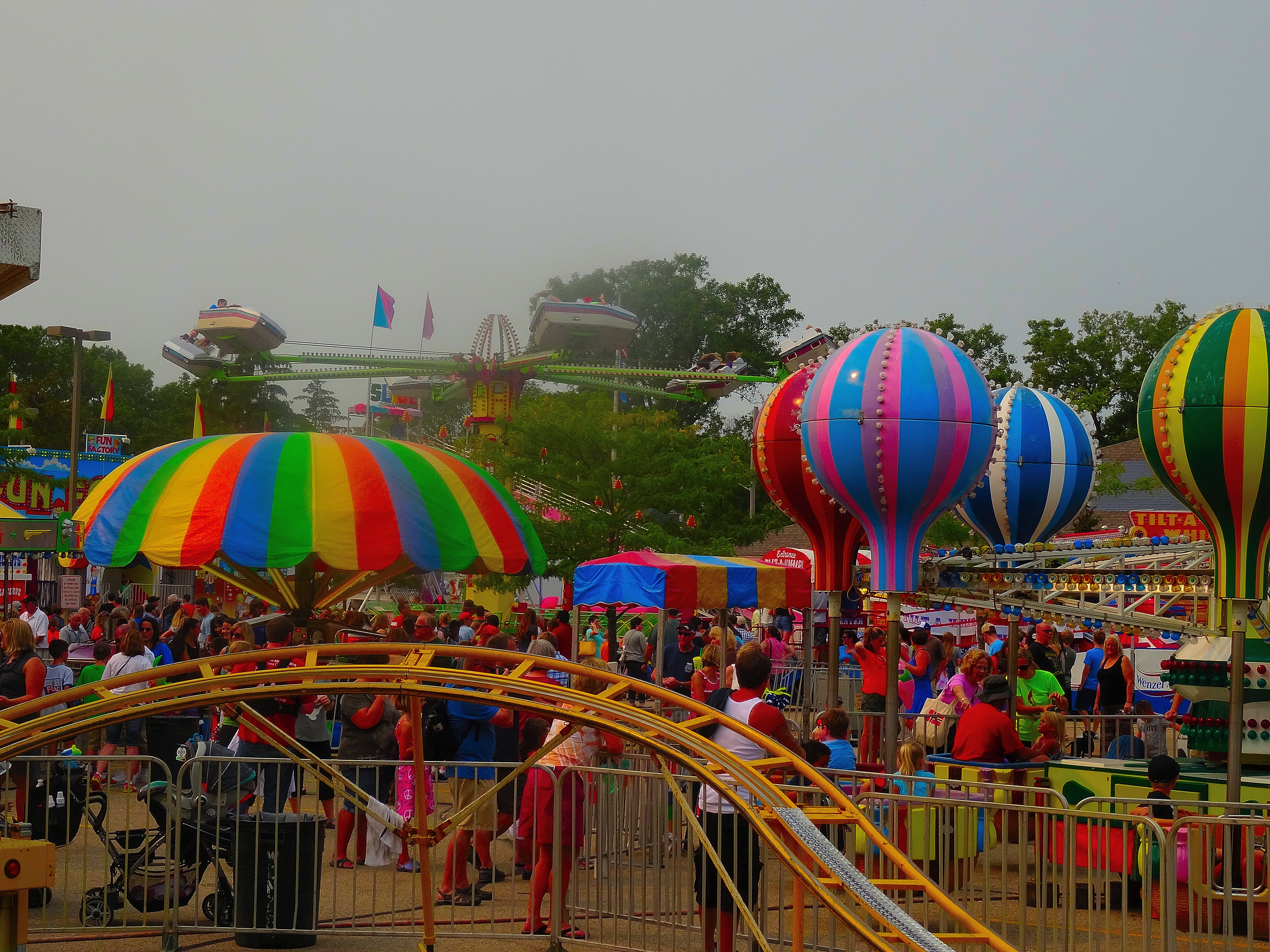
Carnival rides at the annual Middleton Good Neighbor Festival

Middleton has an annual Middleton Good Neighbor Festival held on the last weekend of August next to Middleton High School, on the lawn that is affectionately called "South Beach." The festival has been held since 1964, and "The Good Neighbor Award" has been awarded to a Middleton resident since 1980. The award is given to individuals who have made a difference in the community, and embody what it means to be a Good Neighbor. The three-day festival has free live music, carnival rides, family activities, entertainment, food, parades and other activities.

Downtown Middleton Summer Fun series is typically held from July to August, and it features free music and entertainment on every Thursday. In 2021, the event included arts and crafts table for children, picnic tables, hula hoops, free beginner harmonica lessons and other activities.

National Mustard Day is an outdoor food festival held annually on the first Saturday of August in downtown Middleton. The event features live music, face painting, games and entertainment, food and free mustard samplings. National Mustard Museum has hosted and sponsored the event since 1991.

Haunted Hustle is a Halloween-themed marathon held in October. Other events in Middleton include Wine Walk, Greenway Station Farmers' Market and Prairie Chase Run/Walk. Middleton-Cross Plains Area Performing Arts Center hosts plays and dances.

=== Art ===
Middleton is dedicated to providing and encouraging outdoor public art, including sculptures, murals and stained glass. Visit Middleton's website offers a Middleton's Outdoor Public Art Trail map. Middleton Arts Committee and the Middleton Community Development Authority sponsors and supports art in Middleton.

== Parks and recreation ==
Middleton maintains an extensive system of parks, trails, and conservancy lands. The city's conservancy system includes the Pheasant Branch Conservancy and the Pheasant Branch Creek Corridor, which protect natural areas and provide public trail access.

Pope Farm Conservancy, located in the Town of Middleton near the city, is a separate conservancy with walking trails, wildlife viewing areas, educational signage, restored prairie, and oak savanna landscapes.

The city also operates Quarry Skate Park, a 10,000-square-foot seasonal skate facility with poured-concrete features for skateboarding and rollerblading.

Recreation facilities in Middleton include Pleasant View Golf Course, a municipal golf facility with 27 championship holes, a nine-hole par-3 course, and a practice range. The course has received Madison Magazine's "Best of Madison" golf-course recognition multiple times, including in 2018, 2019, 2020, 2022, 2024, and 2025.

The city’s public outdoor aquatic facility, formerly known as the Walter R. Bauman Aquatic Center, was renamed Bauman Community Pool in 2025. The facility includes a zero-depth-entry pool, an eight-lane competition pool, a diving well, two waterslides, interactive water-play features, and a sand playground.

Middleton is also adjacent to Lake Mendota and near Dane County’s Mendota County Park, which includes camping, a swimming beach, volleyball courts, play equipment, and small-boat access.

== Education ==
Public education in Middleton is provided by the Middleton-Cross Plains School District, which serves the City of Middleton, the Village of Cross Plains, and surrounding communities.

Schools located in Middleton include seven elementary schools, two middle schools, and two high schools. Students attend Middleton High School, the district’s comprehensive high school, or Clark Street Community School, an alternative high school program.

Middleton High School has been ranked among the top high schools in Wisconsin by U.S. News & World Report, based on factors including graduation rates, college readiness, and performance on Advanced Placement exams.

=== Elementary schools ===
- Elm Lawn Elementary School
- Northside Elementary School
- Park Elementary School
- Pope Farm Elementary School
- Sauk Trail Elementary School
- Sunset Ridge Elementary School
- West Middleton Elementary School

=== Middle schools ===
- Glacier Creek Middle School
- Kromrey Middle School

=== High schools ===
- Middleton High School
- Clark Street Community School

== Media ==
Middleton is part of the Madison, Wisconsin media market and is served by regional television, radio, and print outlets based in nearby Madison. Newspapers covering Middleton include the Wisconsin State Journal and The Capital Times, both published in Madison.

Local community coverage is also provided by the Middleton Times-Tribune a newspaper that serves Middleton and surrounding communities.

Several broadcast transmitters serving the Madison market are located in Middleton. The city is the community of license for radio station WWQM (106.3 FM), a country music station serving the Madison area. An FM translator for Catholic radio station WHFA (W247CI, 97.3 FM) also broadcasts from a transmitter located in Middleton.

Middleton is also served by Madison-based television stations including WISC-TV (CBS), WKOW (ABC), WMTV (NBC), and WHA-TV (PBS), which provide news and regional coverage of the community.

The City of Middleton also produces municipal programming and broadcasts public meetings and community information through its online video platform.

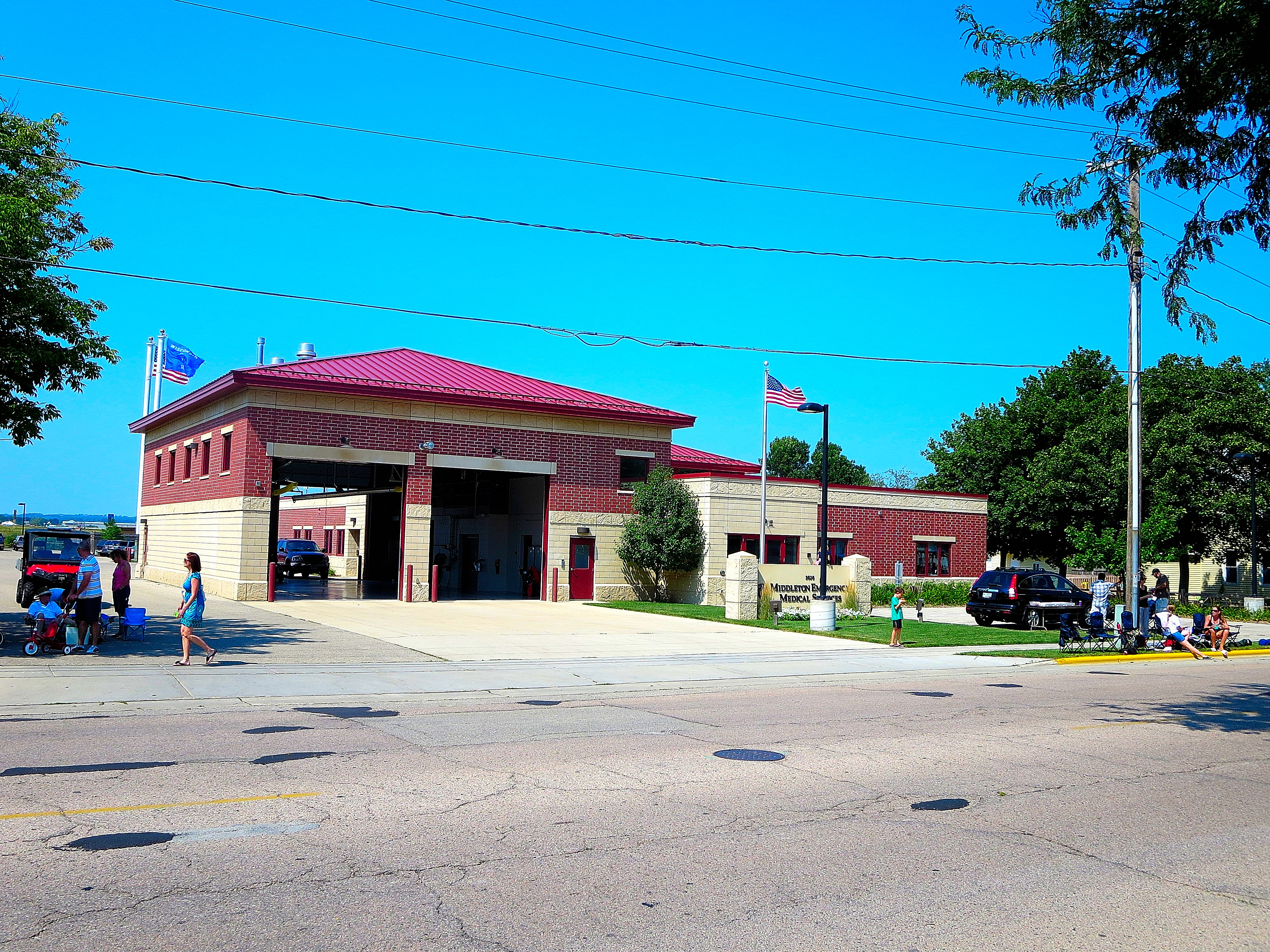
Middleton Emergency Medical Services

== Infrastructure and transportation ==
Middleton maintains municipal infrastructure, including streets, utilities, parks, and a network of multi-use recreational trails. The city maintains approximately 30 miles of shared-use paths and recreational trails connecting neighborhoods, parks, conservancy lands, and commercial areas. Trails identified on city maps include segments associated with the Pheasant Branch Creek Corridor, the Pheasant Branch Conservancy, the North Fork and South Fork trail systems, and other neighborhood trail connections.

Middleton Municipal Airport (C29) is a public-use general aviation airport owned by the City of Middleton and located on the city’s west side. Commercial airline service for the region is provided through Dane County Regional Airport in nearby Madison.

Public transit service is provided by Metro Transit, the Madison-area regional transit system. Metro routes serving Middleton include Route R and Route F, which provide connections between Middleton, the Junction Road Park & Ride, and downtown Madison.

Freight rail service is provided by the Wisconsin and Southern Railroad, which operates through Middleton along its Prairie Subdivision.

Middleton is served by U.S. Route 12 and U.S. Route 14, which pass through the city and connect to the West Beltline Highway (U.S. 12/18) in neighboring Madison.

== Notable people ==
- Matt Blanchard, NFL Quarterback
- Gary Close, basketball coach
- Casey Cramer, football player
- Tracey DeKeyser, ice hockey coach
- Jon Erpenbach, Wisconsin State Senator
- Russ Feingold, Former United States Senator from Wisconsin
- Frank Gault, Wisconsin State Representative
- Ryan Groy, football player
- Pauline Kruger Hamilton, photographer
- Aaron Hohlbein, MLS player
- Ed Janus, journalist
- Jill Karofsky, Justice of the Wisconsin Supreme Court
- Jerry Kleczka, politician
- Paul Kowert, double bassist
- Josh Lambo, football player
- Joe Parisi, Dane County executive
- Bob Skoronski, professional football player
- Rose Schuster Taylor, writer and naturalist at Yosemite
- Otto F. Toepfer, Wisconsin State Representative
- Al Toon, football player
- Nick Toon, football player
- Edo de Waart, conductor and music director

== See also ==
- National Register of Historic Places listings in Dane County, Wisconsin
